= Whitefish River (Thunder Bay District) =

- Location of the mouth of the Whitefish River in Ontario

Location
- Country: Canada
- Province: Ontario
- Region: Northwestern Ontario
- District: Thunder Bay
- Municipalities: Oliver Paipoonge; O'Connor; Gillies

Physical characteristics
- Source: Unnamed lake
  - location: Nolalu Local Service Board
  - coordinates: 48°16′19″N 90°08′43″W
  - elevation: 519 m (1,703 ft)
- Mouth: Kaministiquia River
  - location: Oliver Paipoonge
  - coordinates: 48°21′55″N 89°35′02″W
  - elevation: 216 m (709 ft)
- Length: 45 km (28 mi)

Basin features
- Tributaries
  - left: North River

The Whitefish River is a 45 km (28 mi) long river in Thunder Bay District in northwestern Ontario, Canada. It is in the Lake Superior drainage basin, is a tributary of the Kaministiquia River, and is in the centre of the Whitefish River Valley which is the location of several small settlements that grew along the Port Arthur, Duluth and Western Railway.

== Course ==
The river begins at an unnamed lake in the Nolalu Local Service Board about 7 kilometres (4 mi) northeast of the community of Mackies, on Ontario Highway 588, and flows east to take in the left tributary North River. It continues northeast through the townships of Gillies, O'Connor and Oliver Paipoonge, and reaches its mouth at the Kaministiquia River, which empties into Thunder Bay on Lake Superior.

== Tributaries ==
- Cedar Creek (left)
- Whitewood Creek (left)
- Silver Creek (right)
- Sitch Creek (right)
- Silver Falls Creek (right)
- Beaver Creek (right)
- North River (left)

== See also ==
- List of rivers of Ontario

== Sources ==
- "Whitefish River". Geographical Names Data Base. Natural Resources Canada.
- "Topographic Map sheets 52A5, 52B8". Atlas of Canada. Natural Resources Canada. 2010-02-04.
