= List of secondary highways in Thunder Bay District =

List of Ontario secondary highways

This is a list of secondary highways in Thunder Bay District, most of which serve as logging roads or provide access to the isolated and sparsely populated areas in the Thunder Bay District of northern Ontario.

== Highway 527 ==
Highway 527

Route information
- Maintained by Ontario Ministry of Transportation
- Length: 235.1 km (146.1 mi)
- Existed: 1950s–present

Major junctions
- South end: Highway 17 in Shuniah
- North end: 1st Avenue in Armstrong

Location
- Country: Canada
- Province: Ontario
- Districts: Thunder Bay District

Highway system
- Ontario provincial highways; Current; Former; 400-series
← Highway 526	→ Highway 528

Secondary Highway 527, commonly referred to as Highway 527 is a provincial maintained secondary highway in the Canadian province of Ontario. It is one of the longest secondary highways in the province; only Highway 599 is longer. Highway 527 spans a distance of 235.1 km (146.1 mi) from a junction with Highway 11 and Highway 17, the Trans-Canada Highway, in the community of Shuniah just outside Thunder Bay, to the small, remote community of Armstrong and neighbouring Whitesand Indian Reserve.

The Gull Bay First Nation occupies one of the few permanent settlements on Highway 527, Gull Bay Reserve, situated on the western shore of Lake Nipigon about 70 kilometres south of Armstrong. The highway also passes the start of Highway 811 along its route.

Highway 527 was created in the 1950s as a forest access road and designated Highway 800 in 1963. Throughout the 1960s, the route was gradually extended until it reached what is now Highway 811 in 1969. The route was designated Highway 527 in 1976. Except within the communities of Armstrong and Gull Bay, there are no services or development along this road.

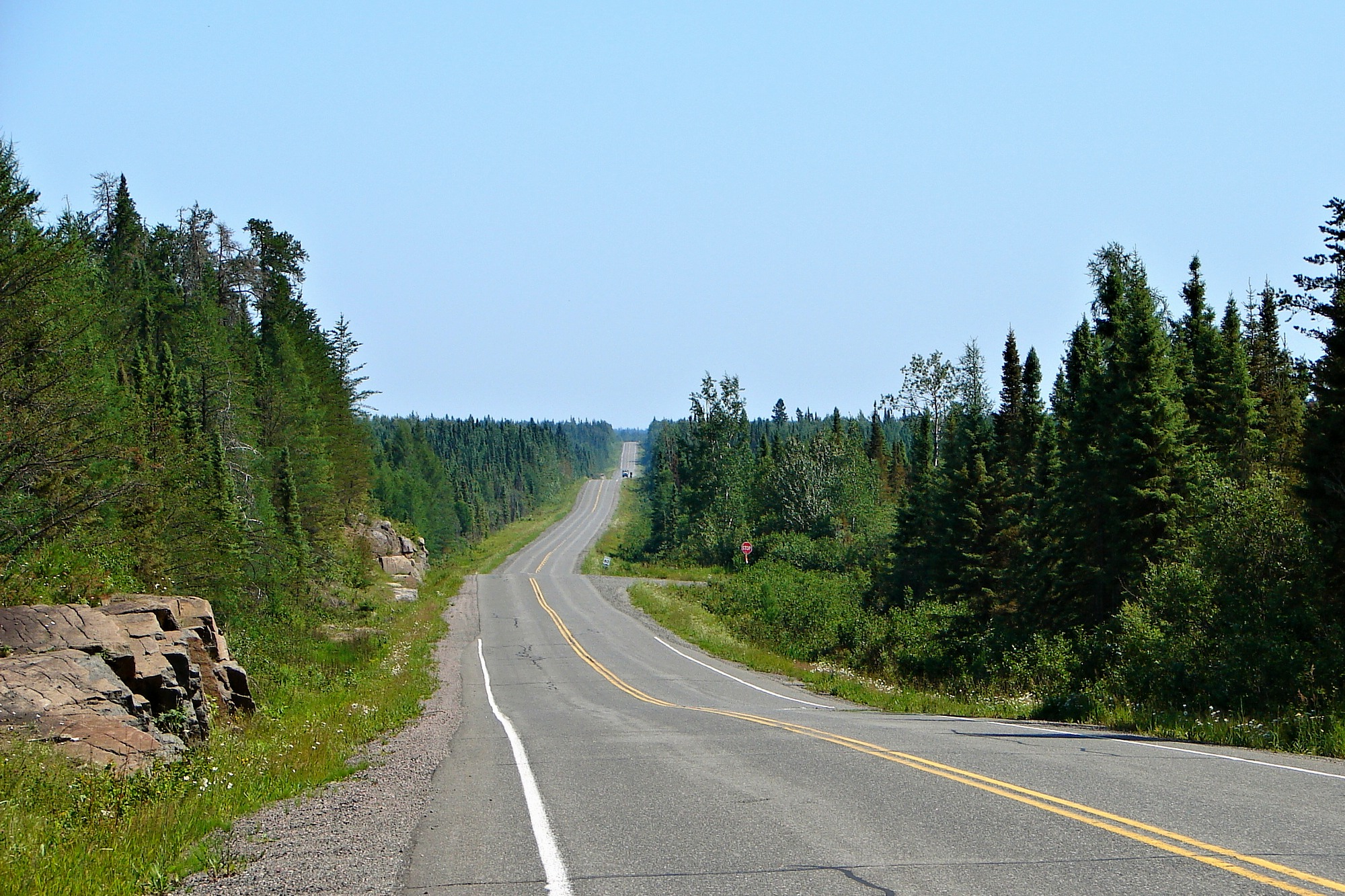
Highway 527

== Highway 580 ==
Highway 580

Route information
- Maintained by Ministry of Transportation of Ontario
- Length: 12.5 km (7.8 mi)
- Existed: 1956–present

Major junctions
- West end: Poplar Lodge at Lake Nipigon
- East end: Highway 11 near Beardmore

Location
- Country: Canada
- Province: Ontario
- Districts: Thunder Bay District

Highway system
- Ontario provincial highways; Current; Former; 400-series
← Highway 579	→ Highway 581

Secondary Highway 580, commonly referred to as Highway 580 is a secondary highway in the Canadian province of Ontario. It is served to connect between Highway 11 near Beardmore to Poplar Lodge near Lake Nipigon. It is also known as The Spruce River Road.

== Highway 582 ==
Highway 582

Route information
- Maintained by Ministry of Transportation of Ontario
- Length: 6.4 km (4.0 mi)

Major junctions
- Southwest end: Highway 11 / Highway 17 / TCH – Thunder Bay
- Northeast end: Highway 11 / Highway 17 / TCH – Nipigon

Location
- Country: Canada
- Province: Ontario
- Districts: Thunder Bay District
- Towns: Hurkett

Highway system
- Ontario provincial highways; Current; Former; 400-series
← Highway 581	→ Highway 583

Highway 582 is a short secondary highway in the Canadian province of Ontario, which serves to connect the small community of Hurkett to Highway 17, the main route of the Trans-Canada Highway through the area.

Highway 582 is itself a former route of Highway 17, which was given its current number when a new alignment of Highway 17 between the two endpoints was later constructed.

== Highway 584 ==
Highway 584

Route information
- Maintained by Ministry of Transportation of Ontario
- Length: 53.1 km (33.0 mi)

Major junctions
- South end: North of Geraldton
- North end: Warren Street in Nakina

Location
- Country: Canada
- Province: Ontario
- Districts: Thunder Bay District
- Towns: Nakina, Geraldton

Highway system
- Ontario provincial highways; Current; Former; 400-series
← Highway 583	→ Highway 585

Secondary Highway 584, commonly referred to as Highway 584 is a secondary highway in the Canadian province of Ontario. The southern terminus is north of the town of Geraldton in Greenstone, while the northern terminus is at Warren Street in Nakina, a length of 53.1 kilometres (33.0 mi). The road is signed as Michael Power Boulevard, First Avenue North, Third Street North, and Center Street.

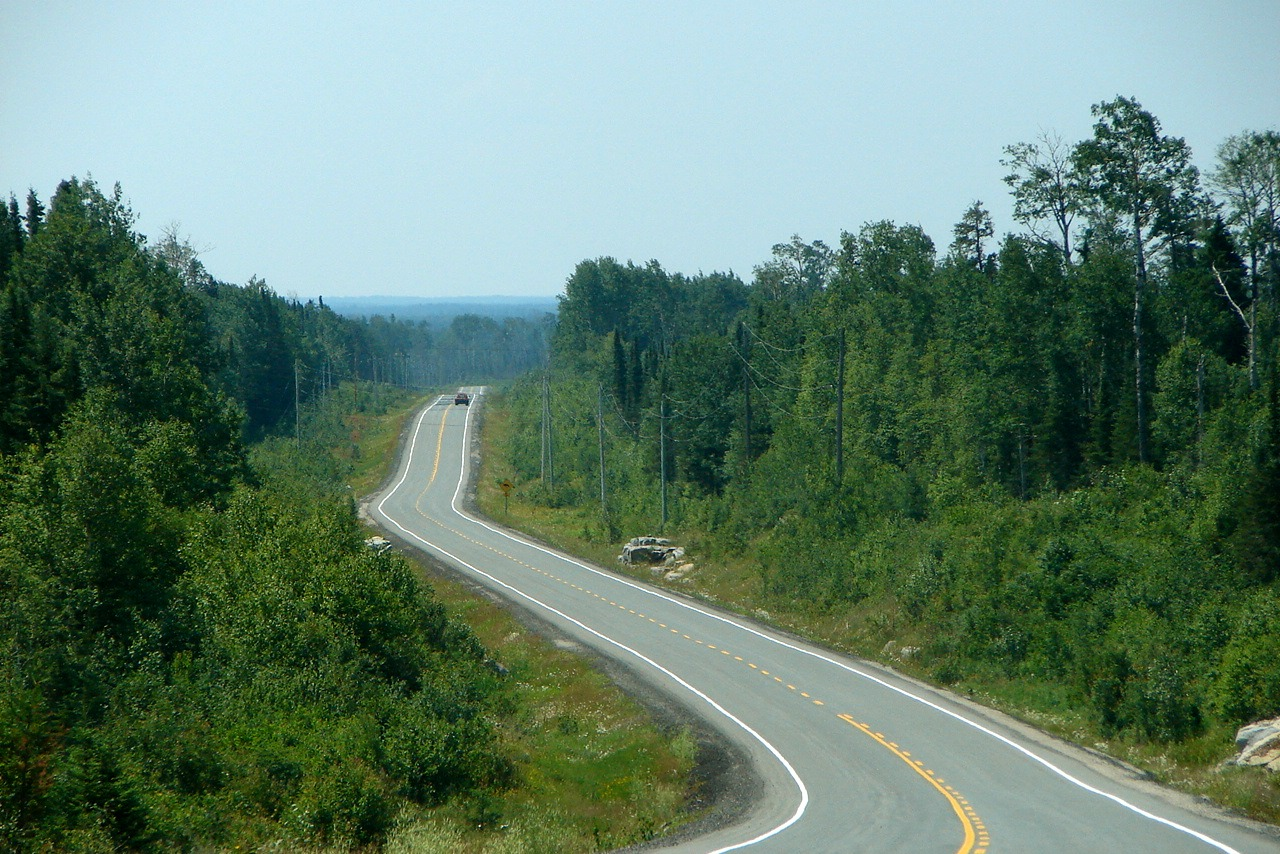
Highway 584

== Highway 585 ==
Highway 585

Route information
- Maintained by Ministry of Transportation of Ontario
- Length: 37.1 km (23.1 mi)

Major junctions
- South end: Highway 11 / Highway 17 / TCH near Nipigon, Ontario
- North end: Pine Portage Hydroelectric Power Plant

Location
- Country: Canada
- Province: Ontario
- Districts: Thunder Bay District
- Towns: Nipigon, Cameron Falls, Pine Portage

Highway system
- Ontario provincial highways; Current; Former; 400-series
← Highway 584	→ Highway 586

Highway 585 is a 36 kilometre road in the Thunder Bay District of Northwestern Ontario, starting at Trans-Canada Highway 11/17 in Nipigon. It travels northward, parallel to the Nipigon River, through the community of Cameron Falls to the Pine Portage Hydroelectric Power Plant.

== Highway 586 ==
Highway 586

Route information
- Maintained by Ministry of Transportation of Ontario
- Length: 5.2 km (3.2 mi)
- Existed: 1956–present

Major junctions
- West end: Dead end at Shebandowan Lakes
- East end: Highway 11 near Shebandowan

Location
- Country: Canada
- Province: Ontario
- Districts: Thunder Bay District

Highway system
- Ontario provincial highways; Current; Former; 400-series
← Highway 585	→ Highway 587

Secondary Highway 586, commonly referred to as Highway 586 is a secondary highway in the Canadian province of Ontario. The western terminus is a dead end near the shores of the Shebandowan Lakes, while the eastern terminus is at an intersection with Highway 11, a length of 5.2 kilometres (3.2 mi). The route was assigned in 1956, when Highway 11 was known as Highway 120.

== Highway 587 ==
Highway 587

Route information
- Maintained by Ministry of Transportation of Ontario
- Length: 41.0 km (25.5 mi)
- Existed: 1956–present

Major junctions
- South end: Silver Islet loop in Sleeping Giant Provincial Park
- North end: Highway 11 / Highway 17 / TCH near Loon

Location
- Country: Canada
- Province: Ontario
- Districts: Thunder Bay District

Highway system
- Ontario provincial highways; Current; Former; 400-series
← Highway 586	→ Highway 588

Highway 587 is a secondary highway 40 kilometres away from Thunder Bay on the Sibley Peninsula. It travels 15 kilometres in the Township Of Shuniah then 22 kilometres in the Sleeping Giant Provincial Park. It begins at Highway 11/Highway 17, across from the Flying J truck stop in Pass Lake, and ends at Silver Islet, where it makes a 6 km (3.7 mi) loop around to connect with itself. Locations along the route include Pass Lake, Silver Islet and a campground called Marie Louise Lake Campground.

=== History ===
Highway 587 started out as a logging road in the 1800s and a connection to the silver mines at Silver Islet, Ontario. Later about the 1870s Sleeping Giant Provincial Park was incorporated and Highway 587 was in the planning stages. Finally about 1940 it was finished. The route was assumed as a provincial highway in 1956.

== Highway 588 ==
Highway 588

Route information
- Maintained by Ministry of Transportation of Ontario
- Length: 54.0 km (33.6 mi)

Major junctions
- West end: 0.8 km (0.50 mi) west of McKechnie Road in Nolalu
- East end: Highway 11 / Highway 17 / TCH in Oliver Paipoonge

Location
- Country: Canada
- Province: Ontario
- Districts: Thunder Bay District
- Major cities: Oliver Paipoonge, Whitefish River Valley

Highway system
- Ontario provincial highways; Current; Former; 400-series
← Highway 587	→ Highway 589

Secondary Highway 588, commonly referred to as Highway 588, is a provincially maintained highway in the Canadian province of Ontario, located in Thunder Bay District.

=== Route description ===
Highway 588 is a 54.0-kilometre (33.6 mi) road in the Thunder Bay District of Northwestern Ontario, starting at Trans-Canada Highway 11/17 in Stanley, Ontario. It travels to approximately 10 kilometres west of the village of Suomi. The highway intersects with Highway 595 south of Hymers, Highway 590 in Nolalu, and Highway 593 between Nolalu and Suomi.

=== Major intersections ===
- Highway 590
- Highway 593
- Highway 595

== Highway 589 ==
Highway 589

Route information
- Maintained by Ministry of Transportation of Ontario
- Length: 25.7 km (16.0 mi)

Major junctions
- North end: Thunder Bay north limits
- South end: Mary Lake Road near Jacques

Location
- Country: Canada
- Province: Ontario
- Districts: Thunder Bay District
- Major cities: Thunder Bay, Lappe

Highway system
- Ontario provincial highways; Current; Former; 400-series
← Highway 588	→ Highway 590

Highway 589, also known as Dog Lake Road, is a 31 kilometre road in the Thunder Bay District of Northwestern Ontario, starting at Highway 102 (Dawson Road) in Thunder Bay. It travels north to Dog Lake. The highway intersects with Highway 591 in Lappe.

=== Towns and Highways ===
- Highway 102
- Highway 591
- Lappe, Ontario

== Highway 590 ==
Highway 590

Route information
- Maintained by Ministry of Transportation of Ontario
- Length: 23.7 km (14.7 mi)
- Existed: 1956–present

Major junctions
- South end: Highway 588 in Nolalu
- Highway 595
- East end: Highway 11 / Highway 17 / TCH at Kakabeka Falls

Location
- Country: Canada
- Province: Ontario
- Districts: Thunder Bay District
- Major cities: Kakabeka Falls, O'Connor, Gillies, Nolalu

Highway system
- Ontario provincial highways; Current; Former; 400-series
← Highway 589	→ Highway 591

Highway 590 is a 26 kilometre road in the Thunder Bay District of Northwestern Ontario, starting at Trans-Canada Highway 11/17 in Kakabeka Falls. It travels west for approximately 12 kilometres then turns due south to terminate at Highway 588 in Nolalu. It intersects with Highway 595.

=== Towns and Highways ===
- Kakabeka Falls
- O'Connor
- South Gillies
- Nolalu

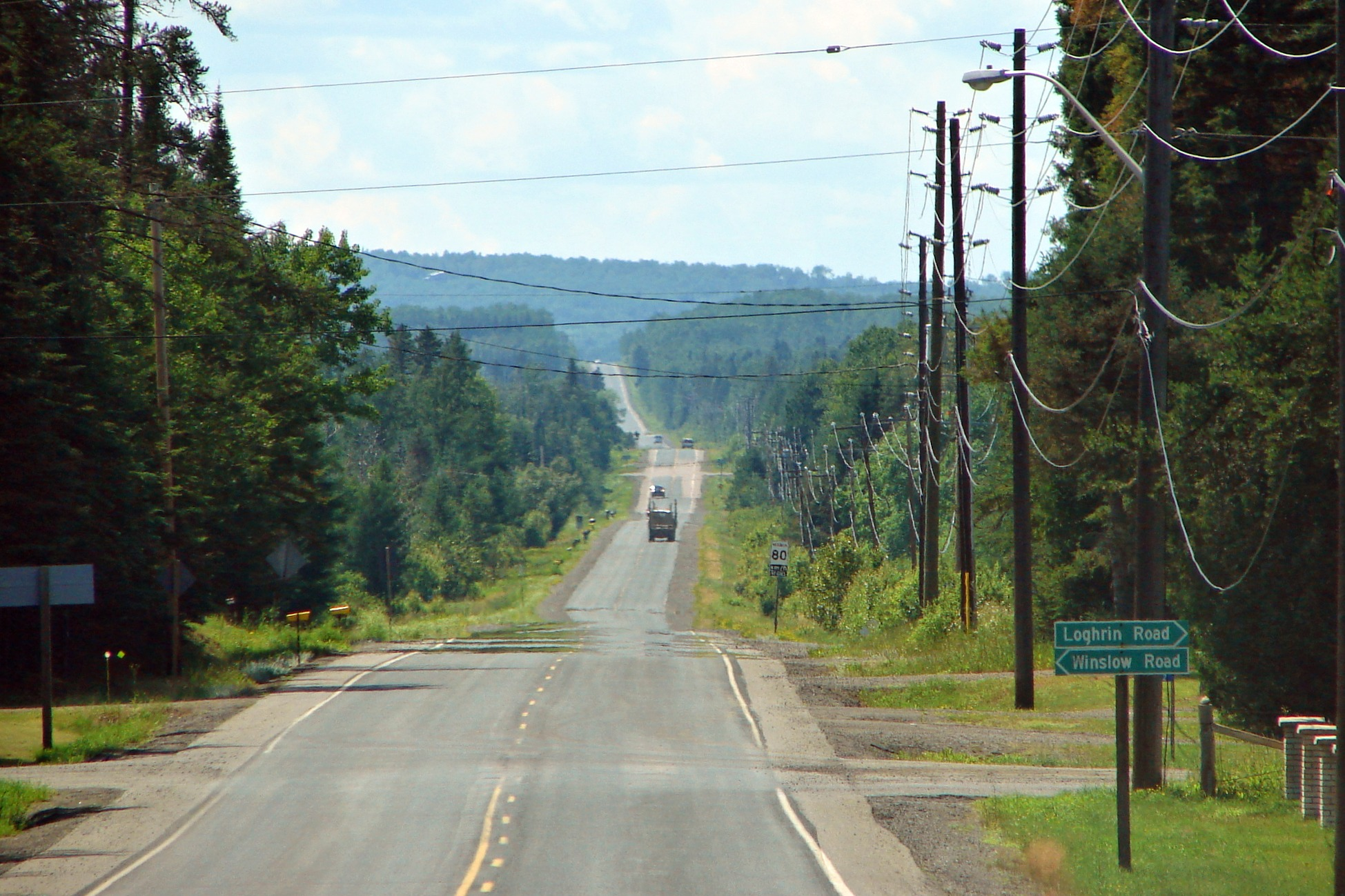
Highway 590

== Highway 591 ==
Highway 591

Route information
- Maintained by Ministry of Transportation of Ontario
- Length: 7.8 km (4.8 mi)
- Existed: 1956–present

Major junctions
- South end: Highway 589 in Lappe, Ontario
- North end: Island Lake Road near Fowler

Location
- Country: Canada
- Province: Ontario
- Districts: Thunder Bay District
- Towns: Lappe, Ontario

Highway system
- Ontario provincial highways; Current; Former; 400-series
← Highway 590	→ Highway 592

Highway 591 is an 8 kilometre road in the Thunder Bay District of Northwestern Ontario, starting at Highway 589 in Lappe. It travels west then north and terminates at the corners of Gilbride and Island Lake Roads, 8 kilometres (5.0 mi) northwest of Lappe.

== Highway 593 ==
Highway 593

Route information
- Maintained by Ministry of Transportation of Ontario
- Length: 37.9 km (23.5 mi)
- Existed: 1956–present

Major junctions
- South end: Highway 61 near Canada–US border
- North end: Highway 588 between Suomi and Nolalu

Location
- Country: Canada
- Province: Ontario
- Districts: Thunder Bay District

Highway system
- Ontario provincial highways; Current; Former; 400-series
← Highway 592	→ Highway 594

Highway 593 is a 52 kilometre road in the Thunder Bay District of Northwestern Ontario, starting at Highway 61, three kilometres north of the Pigeon River border crossing at the Canada–US border. It travels west then north and terminates at Highway 588 between Suomi and Nolalu.

== Highway 595 ==
Highway 595

Route information
- Maintained by Ministry of Transportation of Ontario
- Length: 39.3 km (24.4 mi)
- Existed: 1956–present

Major junctions
- South end: Highway 597 near Pardee
- Highway 608 at South Gillies; Highway 588 near Hymers
- North end: Highway 590 west of Kakabeka Falls

Location
- Country: Canada
- Province: Ontario
- Districts: Thunder Bay District
- Towns: Gillies, Hymers

Highway system
- Ontario provincial highways; Current; Former; 400-series
← Highway 594	→ Highway 596

Highway 595 is a 41 kilometre road in the Thunder Bay District of Northwestern Ontario, starting at Highway 597, 22 kilometres southwest of South Gillies. It travels west then north to Highway 590, 8 kilometres west of Kakabeka Falls. It intersects with Highway 588 south of Hymers and Highway 608 at South Gillies.

=== Towns and highways ===
- Highway 588
- Highway 590
- Highway 597
- Highway 608
- Gillies
- Hymers

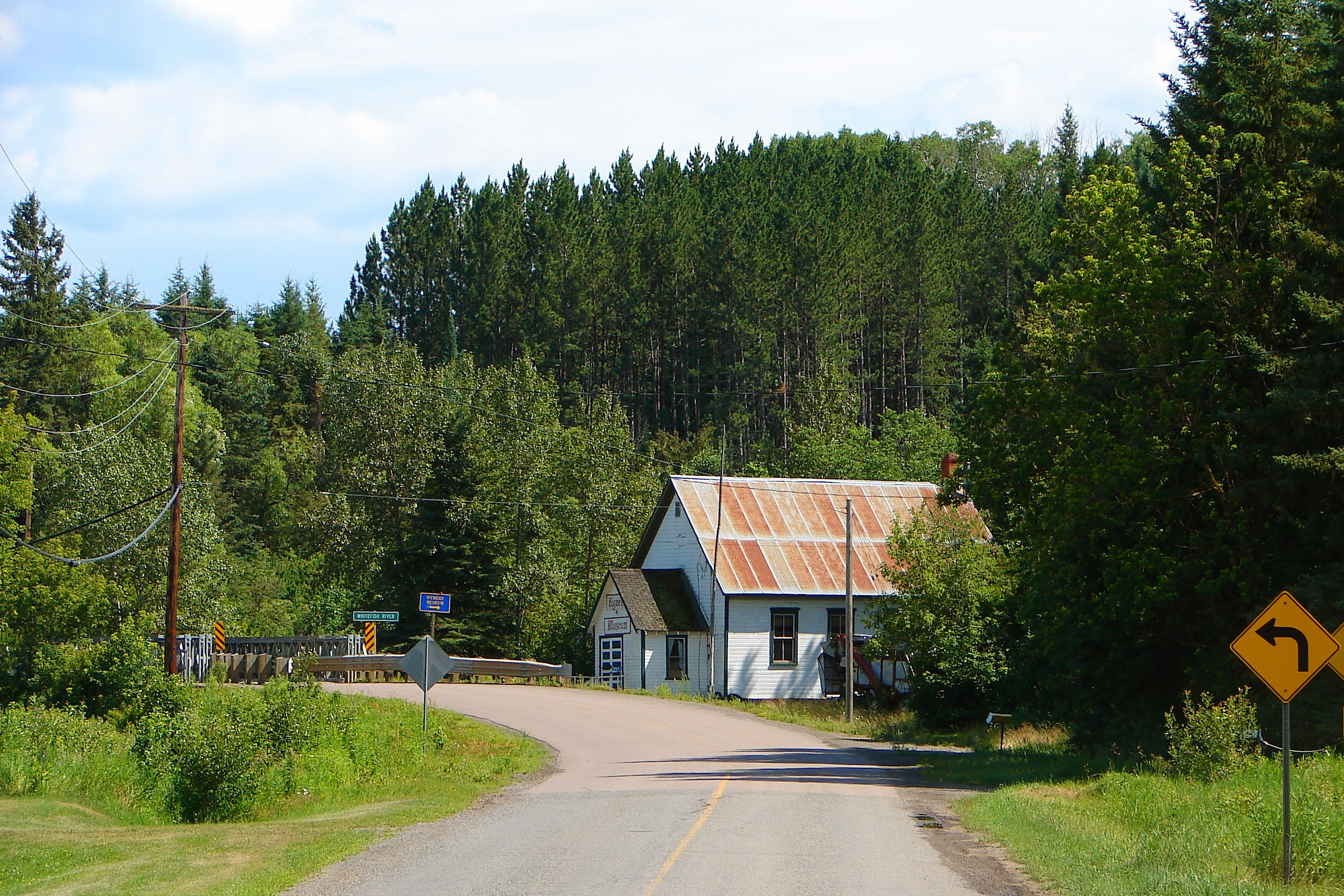
Highway 595 at Hymers

== Highway 597 ==
Highway 597

Route information
- Maintained by Ministry of Transportation of Ontario
- Length: 15.3 km (9.5 mi)

Major junctions
- South end: Cloud Lake Road at Pardee
- Highway 595
- North end: Highway 608 east of South Gillies

Location
- Country: Canada
- Province: Ontario
- Districts: Thunder Bay District

Highway system
- Ontario provincial highways; Current; Former; 400-series
← Highway 596	→ Highway 599

Highway 597 is a 15.3-kilometre (9.5 mi) road in the Thunder Bay District of Northwestern Ontario, starting at Highway 595 in the Cloud Lake area. It travels north to Highway 608, east of South Gillies.

== Highway 608 ==
Highway 608

Route information
- Maintained by Ministry of Transportation of Ontario
- Length: 19.0 km (11.8 mi)

Major junctions
- West end: Highway 595 at South Gilies
- East end: Highway 61 at Moose Hill

Location
- Country: Canada
- Province: Ontario
- Districts: Thunder Bay District

Highway system
- Ontario provincial highways; Current; Former; 400-series
← Highway 607A	→ Highway 609

Secondary Highway 608, commonly referred to as Highway 608, is a secondary highway in the Thunder Bay District of Northwestern Ontario, starting at Highway 595 in South Gillies. It travels 19.0 kilometres (11.8 mi) east to Highway 61, 5 km (3.1 mi) south of Highway 130 in Neebing, Ontario at the community of Moose Hill.

=== Towns and highways ===
- Highway 597
- Highway 61
- Neebing, Ontario
- South Gillies

== Highway 614 ==
Highway 614

Route information
- Maintained by Ministry of Transportation of Ontario
- Length: 51.8 km (32.2 mi)
- Existed: 1956–present

Major junctions
- South end: Highway 17 / TCH – Marathon, White River
- North end: Manitou Road in Manitouwadge

Location
- Country: Canada
- Province: Ontario
- Districts: Thunder Bay District

Highway system
- Ontario provincial highways; Current; Former; 400-series
← Highway 613	→ Highway 615

Secondary Highway 614, commonly referred to as Highway 614, is a secondary highway in the Canadian province of Ontario, located in Thunder Bay District. The route connects Highway 17 (the Trans-Canada Highway) east of Marathon with the mining town of Manitouwadge, where it ends at Manitou Road. The route is 51.8 kilometres (32.2 mi) in length. Highway 614 was assumed in early 1956.

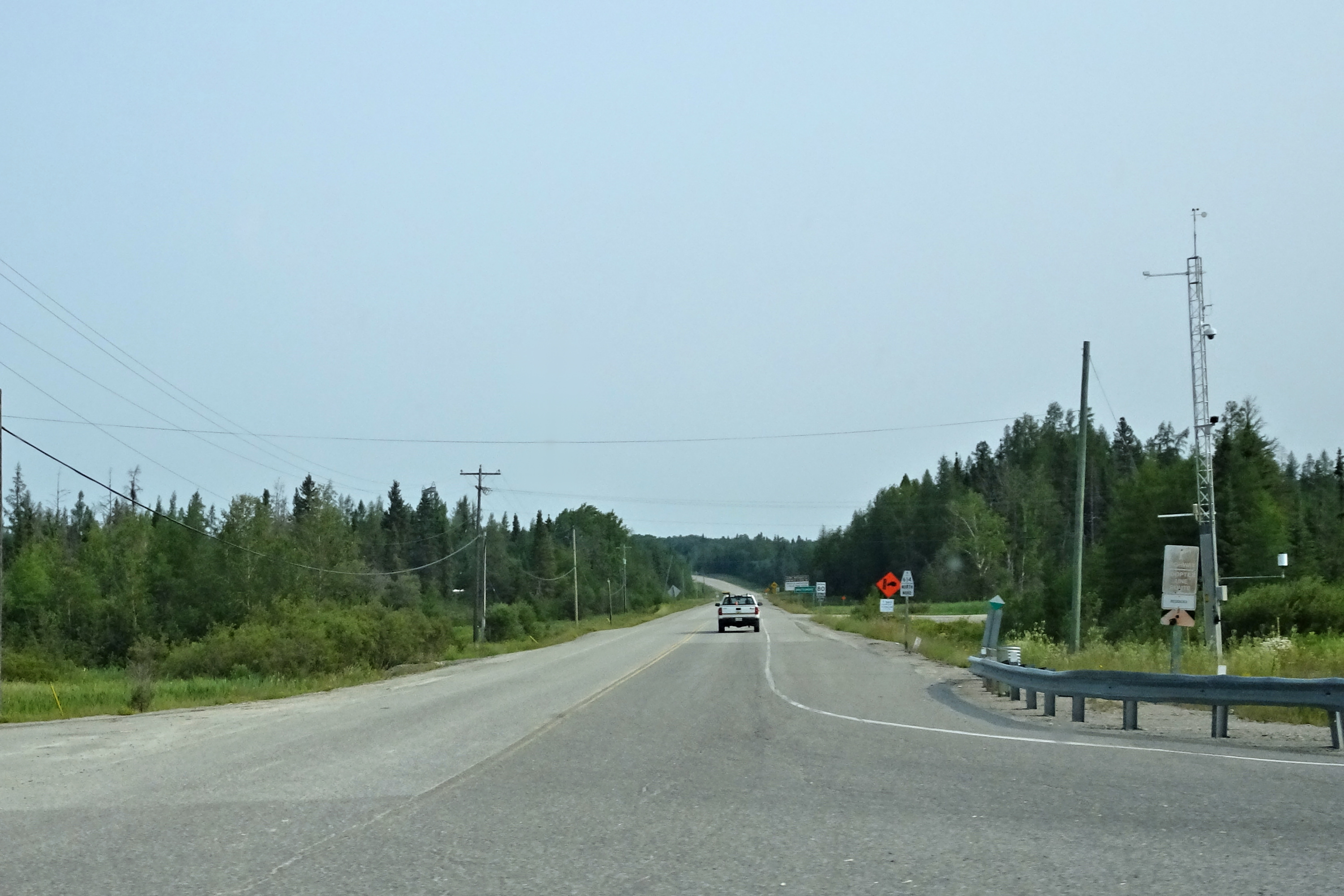
Southern terminus of Highway 614 at Highway 17

== Highway 625 ==
Highway 625

Route information
- Maintained by Ministry of Transportation of Ontario
- Length: 29.6 km (18.4 mi)
- Existed: April 17, 1958–present

Major junctions
- South end: Tamarac Drive in Caramat
- North end: Highway 11 / TCH near Longlac

Location
- Country: Canada
- Province: Ontario
- Districts: Thunder Bay District

Highway system
- Ontario provincial highways; Current; Former; 400-series
← Highway 624	→ Highway 627
Former provincial highways
Highway 626 →

Secondary Highway 625, commonly referred to as Highway 625, is a secondary highway in the Canadian province of Ontario, located in Thunder Bay District. The route begins at Tamarac Drive in the community of Caramat. It travels north 29.6 kilometres (18.4 mi) and ends at Highway 11 (the Trans-Canada Highway) approximately 16 kilometres (9.9 mi) east of Longlac. Highway 625 was assumed on April 17, 1958.

== Highway 627 ==
Highway 627

Route information
- Maintained by Ministry of Transportation of Ontario
- Length: 13.2 km (8.2 mi)
- Existed: July 17, 1958–present

Major junctions
- North end: Highway 17 / TCH near Marathon
- South end: Pukaskwa National Park near Pic River

Location
- Country: Canada
- Province: Ontario
- Districts: Thunder Bay District

Highway system
- Ontario provincial highways; Current; Former; 400-series
← Highway 625	→ Highway 628
Former provincial highways
← Highway 626

Secondary Highway 627, commonly referred to as Highway 627, is a secondary highway in the Canadian province of Ontario, located in Thunder Bay District. The route begins at the visitor's centre for Pukaskwa National Park, from which it travels north 13.2 kilometres (8.2 mi) to end at Highway 17 (the Trans-Canada Highway) just east of Marathon. Highway 627 was assumed on July 17 and July 30, 1958, connecting Heron Bay with Highway 17. It was extended south through the Ojibways of the Pic River First Nation to Pukaskwa National Park circa 1982.

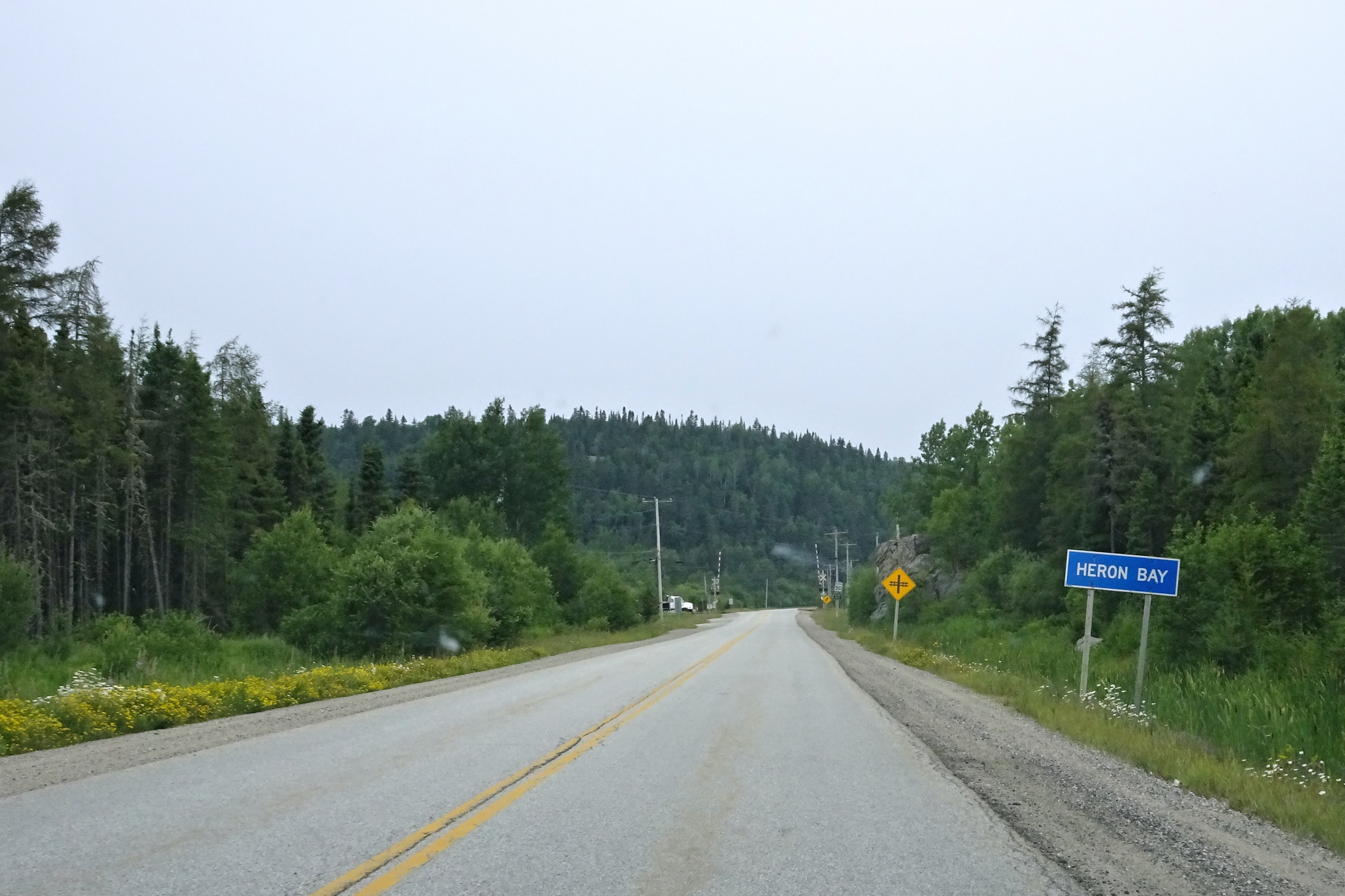
Highway 627 at Heron Bay

== Highway 628 ==
Highway 628

Route information
- Maintained by Ministry of Transportation of Ontario
- Length: 7.3 km (4.5 mi)
- Existed: July 28, 1961–present

Major junctions
- West end: Highway 11 / Highway 17 / TCH near Nipigon
- East end: Redditt CNR station in Red Rock

Location
- Country: Canada
- Province: Ontario
- Divisions: Thunder Bay District
- Towns: Red Rock

Highway system
- Ontario provincial highways; Current; Former; 400-series
← Highway 627	→ Highway 630

Secondary Highway 628, commonly referred to as Highway 628, is a 7.3-kilometre (4.5 mi) secondary highway in the Thunder Bay District of Northwestern Ontario, starting at Trans-Canada Highway, Highway 11/Highway 17 approximately 11 kilometres (6.8 mi) southeast of Nipigon. It travels east to the town of Red Rock.

Highway 628 was assumed by the Department of Highways, predecessor to the Ministry of Transportation on July 28, 1961. It remained unchanged from then until 2015, when construction began on four laning Highway 11/17 between Red Rock Road 9 and Stillwater Creek. The route was extended approximately 350 m (1,150 ft) west in June 2019 to the newly opened four lane highway.

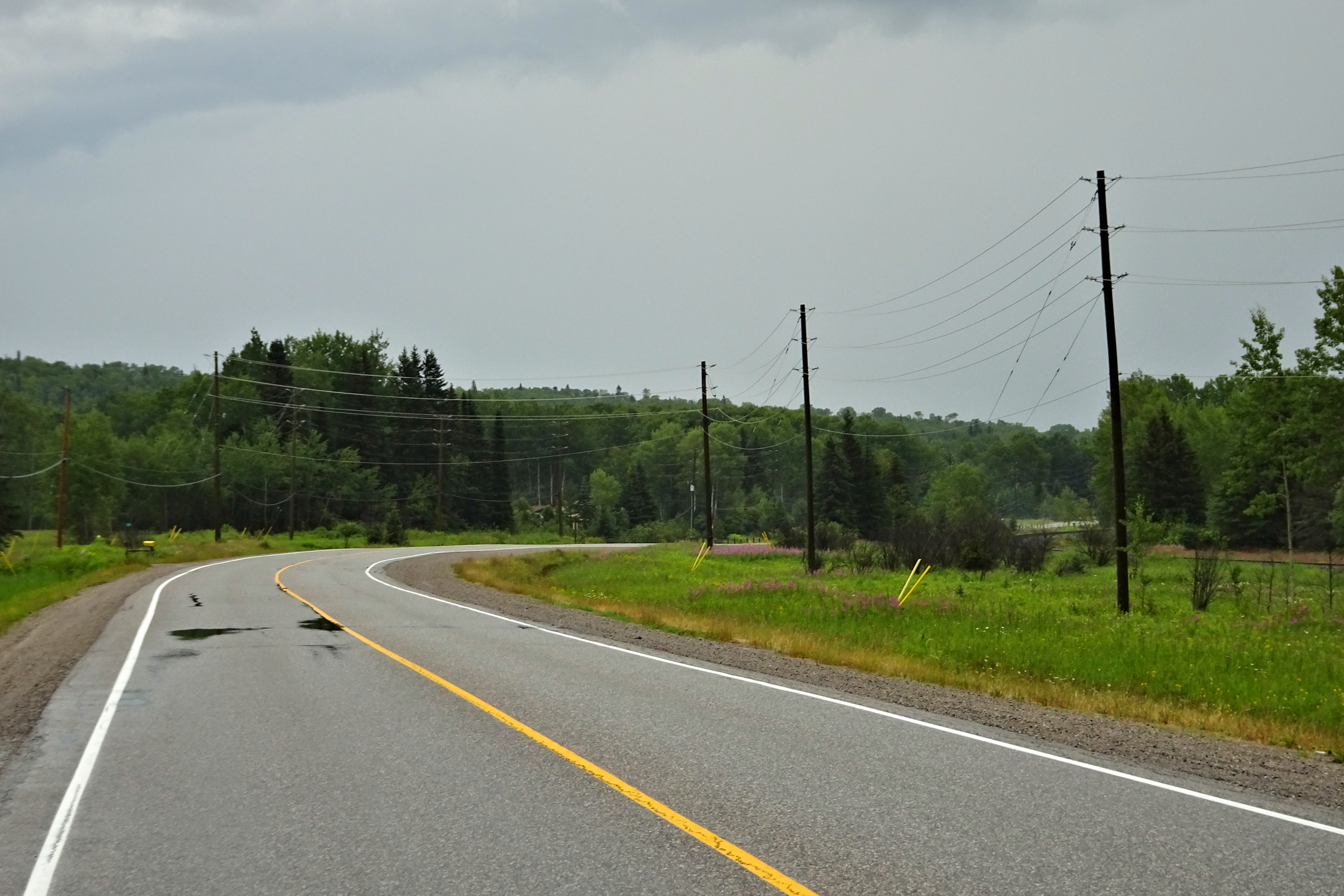
Highway 628 near Red Rock

== Highway 643 ==
Highway 643

Route information
- Maintained by Ministry of Transportation of Ontario
- Length: 19.6 km (12.2 mi)
- Existed: November 7, 1963–present

Major junctions
- West end: Cavell Road near Aroland First Nation
- East end: Highway 584 near Nakina

Location
- Country: Canada
- Province: Ontario
- Districts: Thunder Bay District

Highway system
- Ontario provincial highways; Current; Former; 400-series
← Highway 642	→ Highway 645
Former provincial highways
Highway 644 →

Secondary Highway 643, commonly referred to as Highway 643, is a secondary highway in the Canadian province of Ontario, located in Thunder Bay District. Its total length is approximately 19.6 kilometres (12.2 mi) and runs roughly on a northwest–southeast orientation. The northern terminus intersects Exton Road northwest of Aroland First Nation while the southern terminus intersects Highway 584 near Exton. A proposed all-season access road would connect Marten Falls First Nation to Highway 643.

Highway 643 was assumed by the Department of Highways, predecessor to the modern Ministry of Transportation, in 1963. Although a short 1 km section within Danford Township was assumed on November 7, the majority of its length through Rupert Township and Exton Township was assumed on November 21.
