= Ontario Highway 811 =

Ontario provincial highway

Highway 811

Route information
- Maintained by Ministry of Transportation of Ontario
- Length: 59.0 km (36.7 mi)
- Existed: 1976–present

Major junctions
- West end: Highway 527
- East end: Weaver River Bridge, near Kashishibog Lake

Location
- Country: Canada
- Province: Ontario
- Counties: Thunder Bay District

Highway system
- Ontario provincial highways; Current; Former; 400-series
← Highway 810	→ Highway 2
Former provincial highways
Highway 812 →

Tertiary Highway 811, commonly referred to as Highway 811, is the longest of Ontario's tertiary highways, and the highest posted route number in the province. The route encounters no named roads along its route, aside from its eastern terminus at Secondary Highway 527. It extends 59 kilometres (37 mi) westward into the wilderness, ending at a bridge over the Weaver River. The route was designated in 1976 with the intention of extending it further west, but this extension has yet to be constructed.

== Route description ==
Branching off from Secondary Highway 527, roughly halfway between Thunder Bay and Armstrong, Highway 811 is Ontario's highest numbered route, but also one of its most remote. Aside from its beginning, the highway connects with no named roads along its length. The route begins approximately midway along Highway 527, 114 kilometres (71 mi) north of Ontario Highway 17 and 122.2 kilometres (75.9 mi) south of Armstrong, It zig-zags northwestward for 59 kilometres (37 mi) towards Savant Lake, although as of 2011 the road reaches less than halfway there. It crosses several small rivers as it travels through the Boreal Forest before ending at a bridge over the Weaver River, south of Obonga-Ottertooth Provincial Park. The road is gravel for its entire length. There are no communities along Highway 811; it is almost exclusively used for wilderness travel or forest operations.

== History ==
As part of the 1974 Ontario Highway Capital Construction Program, the Ministry of Transportation and Communications studied the potential benefit of a road connecting Highway 527 southwest of Lake Nipigon with Highway 599 near Savant Lake. A forest road that branched off from Highway 527 was assumed as Highway 811 in 1976. However, the planned connection to Highway 599 has yet to occur, and an 83 kilometres (52 mi) gap separates Savant Lake from the Weaver River. Despite no connection materializing over the past 35 years, and no plans to construct that connection presently, Highway 811 remains a signed and maintained provincial highway.

== Major intersections ==
The following table lists the major junctions along Highway 811, as noted by the Ministry of Transportation of Ontario. The entire route is located in Thunder Bay District. Distances along the remote highway are referenced using bridges and culverts.

Location	km	mi	Destinations	Notes
Unorganized Thunder Bay	0.0	0.0	Highway 527 – Thunder Bay, Armstrong	
Unorganized Thunder Bay	16.8	10.4	Gull River culvert	
Unorganized Thunder Bay	30.9	19.2	Mooseland River Bridge	
Unorganized Thunder Bay	43.6	27.1	Grew River culvert	
Unorganized Thunder Bay	59.0	36.7	Weaver River Bridge	Listed as a "temporary bridge", as it has been since at least 1989.
1.000 mi = 1.609 km; 1.000 km = 0.621 mi
