= Ontario Highway 102 =

Ontario provincial highway

Highway 102
- Highway 102 highlighted in red

Route information
- Maintained by the Ministry of Transportation of Ontario
- Length: 32.8 km (20.4 mi)
- Existed: 1972–present

Major junctions
- West end: Highway 11 / Highway 17 at Sistonens Corners
- Highway 589 – Lappe
- East end: Highway 11 / Highway 17 in Thunder Bay

Location
- Country: Canada
- Province: Ontario

Highway system
- Ontario provincial highways; Current; Former; 400-series
← Highway 101	→ Highway 105
Former provincial highways
Highway 103 →

King's Highway 102, commonly referred to as Highway 102 or Dawson Road, and formerly as Highway 11A and Highway 17A is a provincially maintained highway in the Canadian province of Ontario, connecting the north side of Thunder Bay with Highway 11 and 17 in Sistonens Corner as well as several rural routes north of the city. Both the western and eastern termini of Highway 102 are with the concurrency of Highway 11 and Highway 17; in the rural community of Sistonens Corners to the west and in Thunder Bay to the east. The majority of Highway 102 is surrounded by thick forests and swamps. However, owing to its historic nature, it is lined with residences.

Although the road Highway 102 now follows dates to the 1850s, it did not become a provincial highway until 1937, when it was designated as Highway 17A. Between 1960 and 1971, following the extension of Highway 11 to Rainy River, it was also designated as Highway 11A. By 1972, the route had been renumbered as Highway 102.

== Route description ==
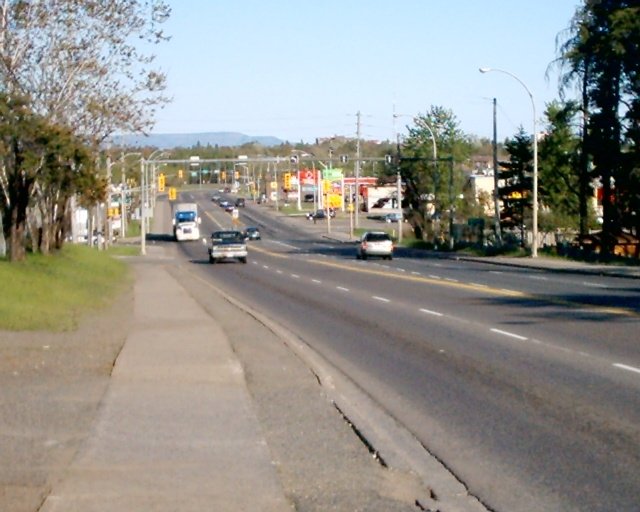
Highway 102 within Thunder Bay

Highway 102 passes through terrain typical of northern Ontario highways, including thick boreal forest and muskeg. On a 32.8 km (20.4 mi) eastward journey, the surroundings quickly change from isolated muskeg-ridden foothills to urban development as the highway enters Thunder Bay from the north. Highway 102 provides a shortcut over the Trans-Canada Highway to the south.

Highway 102 begins at Sistonens Corners, immediately south of a Canadian National Railway (CN) overpass, along Highway 11 and Highway 17. A truck stop sits to the west of the intersection. From there, the two-lane road travels east through rolling hills, with muskeg dotting the valleys between the hills. It parallels roughly 1 kilometre (0.62 mi) to the south of the Shebandowan River for 4.5 kilometres (2.8 mi) before crossing both the CN and Canadian Pacific Railway tracks as well as the Kaministiquia River. The highway meets Silver Falls Road, which proceeds north to Silver Falls Provincial Park. The terrain becomes gentler as the route passes several houses while travelling alongside a creek. The highway curves as it meets a power transmission line, which it then parallels. It zig-zags southeast, passing alongside Mud Lake and briefly curving back to the east. Curving back to the southeast, the highway serves several houses before crossing into Thunder Bay at Townline Road and curving to the east.

Within the city limits, the density of residences surrounding the highway rapidly increases as the terrain flattens. The highway intersects Mapleward Road, then diverges from the power transmission lines and curves southeast into suburban Thunder Bay. It meets Secondary Highway 589 after passing the Emerald Greens Golf Course. The route then travels through North McIntyre, formerly a separate community which was annexed. It descends through a wide muskeg, after which it is crossed by several power transmission lines. The highway enters urban Thunder Bay immediately thereafter, where it passes to the west of County Fair Mall before ending at an intersection with the Highway 11/17. The road which carries Highway 102 continues into downtown Port Arthur as Red River Road, and was once part of the highway and is now a major artery in Thunder Bay.

== History ==
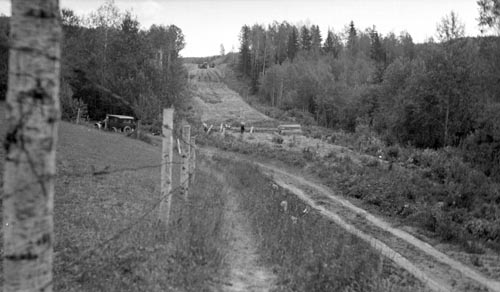
Work on widening the Dawson Road and clearing a new alignment in 1935

Highway 102 was designated by the beginning of 1972, following the route of the former Highway 11A and Highway 17A. Prior to that, the Dawson Road generally followed the present route of the highway.

The history of the Dawson Road began in 1857 when Henry Hind and Simon Dawson were commissioned to survey the territorial claims of the Hudson's Bay Company, as well as to survey a route between Lake Superior and the Red River. A second set of surveys were carried out by Captain John Palliser that same year. The latter recommended avoiding the Kaministiquia River, but ultimately Hind and Dawson's route was chosen. By 1868, the route was blazed between Shebandowan and what would soon be named Prince Arthur's Landing (later changed to Port Arthur). In 1870, the Wolseley Expedition set out from Toronto to end the Red River Rebellion. When Colonel Garnet Wolseley arrived at the present site of Winnipeg, the rebels had fled. However, the expedition resulted in the construction of a road along Dawson's route. It was further improved in 1871.

In 1935, the Department of Northern Development (DND) began construction on a northern bypass of Port Arthur, mostly following the Dawson Road. This road was designated Highway 17A on April 1, 1937, when the DND merged into the Department of Highways. In 1959, Highway 120 was renumbered as Highway 11, and a 180-kilometre (110 mi) concurrency with Highway 17 between Shabaqua Corners and Nipigon was created to join the discontinuous segments. As the northern bypass of Port Arthur now formed an alternate route to both Highway 11 and 17, it was codesignated as Highway 11A and 17A.

Between January 1971 and 1972, Highway 11A and Highway 17A were redesignated as Highway 102. Work began shortly thereafter to realign several sections of the highway with dangerous curves and steep grades approaching the Kaministiquia River; the highway opened in 1975, featuring a new bridge over the river.

Following years of back and forth discussions, (leaning towards having no truck route), Thunder Bay City Council implemented a designated truck route on their portion of highway 102, which controversially bans trucks on this safe corridor effective October 1st 2025. Trucks will instead have to drive through Thunder Bay to continue down Highway 11/17, through the little village of Kakabeka Falls, which does not have the infrastructure in place to accept the extra vehicles through their town.

== Major intersections ==
The following table lists the major junctions along Highway 102, as noted by the Ministry of Transportation of Ontario. The entire route is located in Thunder Bay District.

Location	km	mi	Destinations	Notes
Sistonens Corners	0.0	0.0	Highway 11 / Highway 17 / TCH – Shabaqua Corners	Western terminus
Kaministiquia	4.9	3.0	Silver Falls Road	To Silver Falls Provincial Park and Highway 591
Thunder Bay	22.6	14.0	Mapleward Road	
Thunder Bay	26.0	16.2		End of Thunder Bay jurisdiction over highway
Thunder Bay	26.2	16.3	Highway 589 (Dog Lake Road) – Lappe	
Thunder Bay	32.7	20.3		Beginning of Thunder Bay jurisdiction over highway
Thunder Bay	32.8	20.4	Highway 11 / Highway 17 (Thunder Bay Expressway) / TCH – Nipigon	Eastern terminus; continues as Red River Road
1.000 mi = 1.609 km; 1.000 km = 0.621 mi
