= Finmark =

Finmark may refer to:

- Finmark, Ontario, a community in the Thunder Bay District of Ontario
- the Sápmi (area)
- a misspelling of Finnmark, a county in Norway.
- a misspelling of Finland, a Nordic country.
