= East Gorham =

- Local services board
- Location of the board office in Ontario
- Coordinates: 48°33′48″N 89°25′02″W
- Country: Canada
- Province: Ontario
- District: Thunder Bay

Government
  - Chair: Murray Cook
  - Board Members: Vicki Kutzak, Pat Williams, Ted Post, Shelley Tuomi
- Elevation: 451 m (1,480 ft)
- Time zone: UTC-5 (Eastern Time Zone)
  - Summer (DST): UTC-4 (Eastern Time Zone)
- Postal code: P7G
- Area code: 807

East Gorham is a local services board for the unincorporated geographic townships of Gorham and Jacques in Thunder Bay District, Ontario, Canada.

The area is counted as part of Unorganized Thunder Bay District in Statistics Canada census data.

The elections for the board for the period October 1, 2019 to September 30, 2020, held on September 19, 2020, had the result of Murray Cook as chair and Vicki Kutzak, Patricia Williams, Ted Post and Shelley Tuomi as board members.

The community of Lappe is at the southern border of the board's jurisdiction at the junction of Ontario Highway 589 and Ontario Highway 591. Ontario Highway 589 continues north through Gorham and Jacques townships and then further on its way to its northern terminus at Dog Lake.
