= Local services board =

Service board

A local services board (LSB) is an organization in the Canadian province of Ontario that is contracted by the Government of Ontario to provide municipal-level services in a community that is not part of an incorporated municipality.

Most local services boards are elected by residents of the communities they serve. Depending on the community, the services provided may include water, sewage, street lighting, garbage collection, recreational, fire department, library and/or emergency telecommunications services. Maintenance of local roads in a local services board's jurisdictional area is generally contracted to a separate local roads board.

Local services boards exist in the Northern Ontario region and in the Parry Sound District, the parts of the province where there is no county-level system of government. They are primarily overseen by the provincial Ministry of Northern Development and Mines, which provides them with annual operating grant funding, although the Ministry of Municipal Affairs and Housing also has a role in their governance.

Most, but not all, communities which have a local services board are accorded the status of designated place in Statistics Canada censuses. However, Statistics Canada does not aggregate separate census data for local service boards which are not also designated places, including them only in the aggregated data for unorganized areas.

There are currently 46 local services boards operating in the province; the newest, Greater Oxdrift, was incorporated in 2009. Some former local services boards have also been dissolved — this may occur because the community is subsequently incorporated as a true municipality, because the service area is annexed into a larger municipality or because the agency is no longer able, for financial or political reasons, to offer the level of service expected of an LSB.

== Local service boards ==
Local services boards by district in Ontario
District	Board
Algoma	Batchawana Bay; Aweres; Goulais and District; Hawk Junction; Missanabie; Peace Tree; Searchmont; Wharncliffe and Kynoch
Cochrane	Hallebourg; Jogues; Lac-Sainte-Thérèse; Moose Factory
Kenora	Greater Oxdrift; KeeMan; Melgund; Minaki; Pellatt, Pelican, Umbach, Gidley; Redditt; Round Lake; Wabigoon
Manitoulin	Dawson; Robinson
Nipissing	Redbridge; Thorne; Tilden Lake
Parry Sound	Britt-Byng Inlet; Laurier; Loring, Port Loring and District; Restoule
Sudbury	Cartier; Foleyet; Gogama; Rainbow Country
Thunder Bay	Armstrong; East Gorham; Hurkett; Kaministiquia; Lappe and Area; Nolalu; Rossport; Shebandowan; Upsala
Timiskaming	Kenogami; King-Lebel; Maisonville; Savard
