= Whitefish River Valley =

Valley in Ontario, Canada

Coordinates: 48°17′00″N 89°50′00″W

The Whitefish River Valley is located in the unorganized area of Thunder Bay District, Ontario, and is named for the Whitefish River that flows through it. The valley is home to several small communities that developed when land was opened for homesteading under the Dominion Lands Act along the Port Arthur, Duluth and Western Railway line at the turn of the 20th century and many people, particularly those from Finland, settled in the area. Today, it has a population of approximately 1,362.

Education in the valley is provided by the Whitefish Valley School, which is located in Hymers and operated by the Lakehead District School Board.

== Communities ==
Communities in the Whitefish River Valley include Flint, Harstone, Hillside, Hymers, Leeper, Nolalu, Sellers, and Silver Mountain. Part of the valley is located in the municipalities of O'Connor and Gillies. The remainder is located in the local services board of Nolalu.

Hillside is a hamlet on Highway 588. It was settled by homesteaders from Finland in the early 1900s. There were many small dairy farms and fields in Hillside until the 1950s. Hillside had its own train platform along the Port Arthur, Duluth and Western Railway, as well as its own school built in 1914.

Nolalu is a village located on Highway 588. It is located in Lybster geographic township. The term "Nolalu" is an abbreviation of a company that was called "Northern Lands and Lumber" and is also used to describe a wide area around the village, as well as the local service board that oversees roads and services in much of the valley. The Whitefish River flows through the village on its way toward the Kaministiquia River.
