= Pic Mobert South =

- Indian reserve
- Pic Mobert South Indian Reserve
- Location within Ontario
- Coordinates: 48°41′N 85°39′W
- Country: Canada
- Province: Ontario
- District: Thunder Bay
- First Nation: Netmizaaggamig Nishnaabeg

Area
  - Land: 0.34 km^{2} (0.13 sq mi)

Population (2011)
  - Total: 96
  - Density: 282.4/km^{2} (731/sq mi)
- Website: picmobert.ca

Pic Mobert South is a First Nations reserve in Thunder Bay District, Ontario. It is one of two reserves of the Netmizaaggamig Nishnaabeg (Pic Mobert), alongside Pic Mobert North.
