= Pic Mobert North =

- Indian reserve
- Pic Mobert North Indian Reserve
- Location within Ontario
- Coordinates: 48°41′N 85°38′W
- Country: Canada
- Province: Ontario
- District: Thunder Bay
- First Nation: Netmizaaggamig Nishnaabeg

Area
  - Land: 1.73 km^{2} (0.67 sq mi)

Population (2011)
  - Total: 193
  - Density: 111.3/km^{2} (288/sq mi)
- Website: picmobert.ca

Pic Mobert North is a First Nations reserve in Thunder Bay District, Ontario, Canada. It is one of two reserves of the Netmizaaggamig Nishnaabeg (Pic Mobert), alongside Pic Mobert South.
