= O'Connor, Ontario =

O'Connor
- Township (single-tier)
- Township of O'Connor
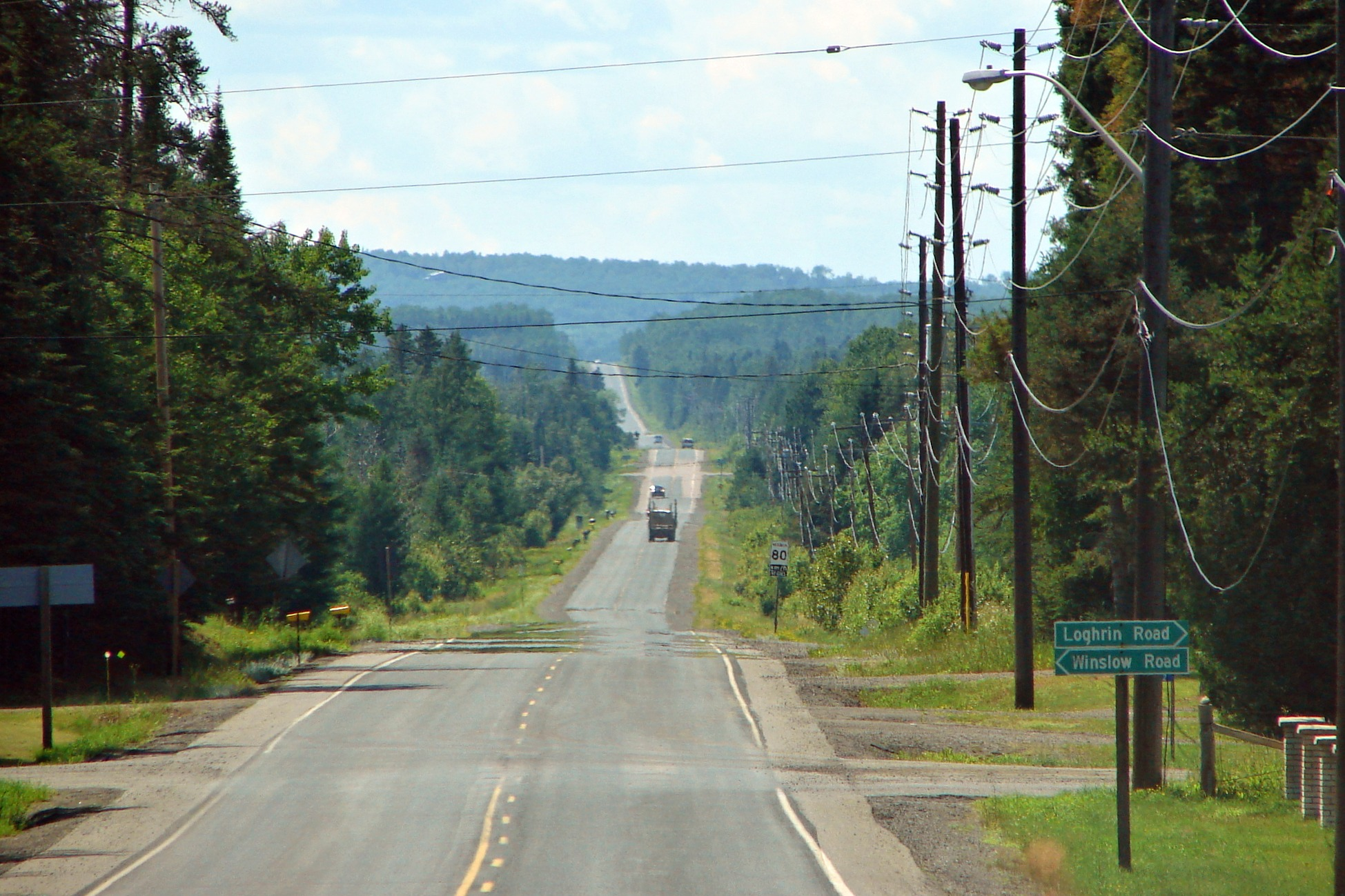
- Motto: Country Living at its Best
- Location within Ontario
- Coordinates: 48°22′N 89°42′W
- Country: Canada
- Province: Ontario
- District: Thunder Bay
- Settled: 1887
- Incorporated: 1907

Government
  - Mayor: Jim Vezina
  - Fed. riding: Thunder Bay—Rainy River
  - Prov. riding: Thunder Bay—Atikokan

Area
  - Land: 108.56 km^{2} (41.92 sq mi)

Population (2021)
  - Total: 689
  - Density: 6.3/km^{2} (16/sq mi)
- Time zone: UTC-5 (EST)
  - Summer (DST): UTC-4 (EDT)
- Postal code: P0T 1W0
- Area code: 807
- Website: www.oconnortownship.ca

O'Connor is a township in the Canadian province of Ontario, located 32 kilometres (20 mi) west of the city of Thunder Bay. The township was formed on January 1, 1907. The township serves as a bedroom community of Thunder Bay, with some agriculture, and is part of Thunder Bay's Census Metropolitan Area.

The township was opened to settlement in 1887 because of the silver mining boom, and named by the Ontario government after Port Arthur businessman, alderman and police magistrate James Joseph O'Connor (1857–1930).

Since January 1st, 2015, the mayor of O'Connor is Jim Vezina. The township has four councillors: John Sobolta, Carly Torkkeli, Alex Crane, and Brendan Rea.

The township maintains a disposal site, a skating rink, basketball court, and a fire station staffed by volunteer fire fighters. The township produces and distributes a newsletter called The Cornerstone.

O'Connor's primary industry is agriculture. Many residents commute to work either to Thunder Bay or the surrounding woodlands.

== Geography ==
The geography of O'Connor is mainly flat open farmland and rolling hills, with the Whitefish River Valley dominating the southeast corner of the township. The township contains many creeks and rivers. The most notable geographic feature is Kakabeka Falls, located in the northeastern corner of the municipality near the community of Kakabeka Falls, Ontario.

== Demographics ==
In the 2021 Census of Population conducted by Statistics Canada, O'Connor had a population of 689 living in 274 of its 283 total private dwellings, a change of 3.9% from its 2016 population of 663. With a land area of 108.56 km^{2} (41.92 sq mi), it had a population density of 6.3/km^{2} (16.4/sq mi) in 2021.

Canada census – O'Connor community profile

	2021	2016	2011
Population	689 (+3.9% from 2016)	663 (-3.2% from 2011)	685 (-4.9% from 2006)
Land area	108.56 km^{2} (41.92 sq mi)	108.78 km^{2} (42.00 sq mi)	108.65 km^{2} (41.95 sq mi)
Population density	6.3/km^{2} (16/sq mi)	6.1/km^{2} (16/sq mi)	6.3/km^{2} (16/sq mi)
Median age	46.0 (M: 46.8, F: 44.8)	44.7 (M: 45.4, F: 43.9)	42.4 (M: 43.1, F: 41.4)
Private dwellings	283 (total) 274 (occupied)	272 (total)	274 (total)
Median household income	$104,000	$89,856

References: 2021 2016 2011

Historical census populations – O'Connor, Ontario

Year	Pop.	±%
1901	151	—
1911	371	+145.7%
1921	394	+6.2%
1931	330	−16.2%
1941	368	+11.5%
1951	332	−9.8%
1956	367	+10.5%

Year	Pop.	±%
1961	375	+2.2%
1966	375	+0.0%
1971	422	+12.5%
1976	500	+18.5%
1981	595	+19.0%
1986	661	+11.1%
1991	687	+3.9%

Year	Pop.	±%
1996	739	+7.6%
2001	724	−2.0%
2006	720	−0.6%
2011	685	−4.9%
2016	663	−3.2%
2021	689	+3.9%

Source: Statistics Canada

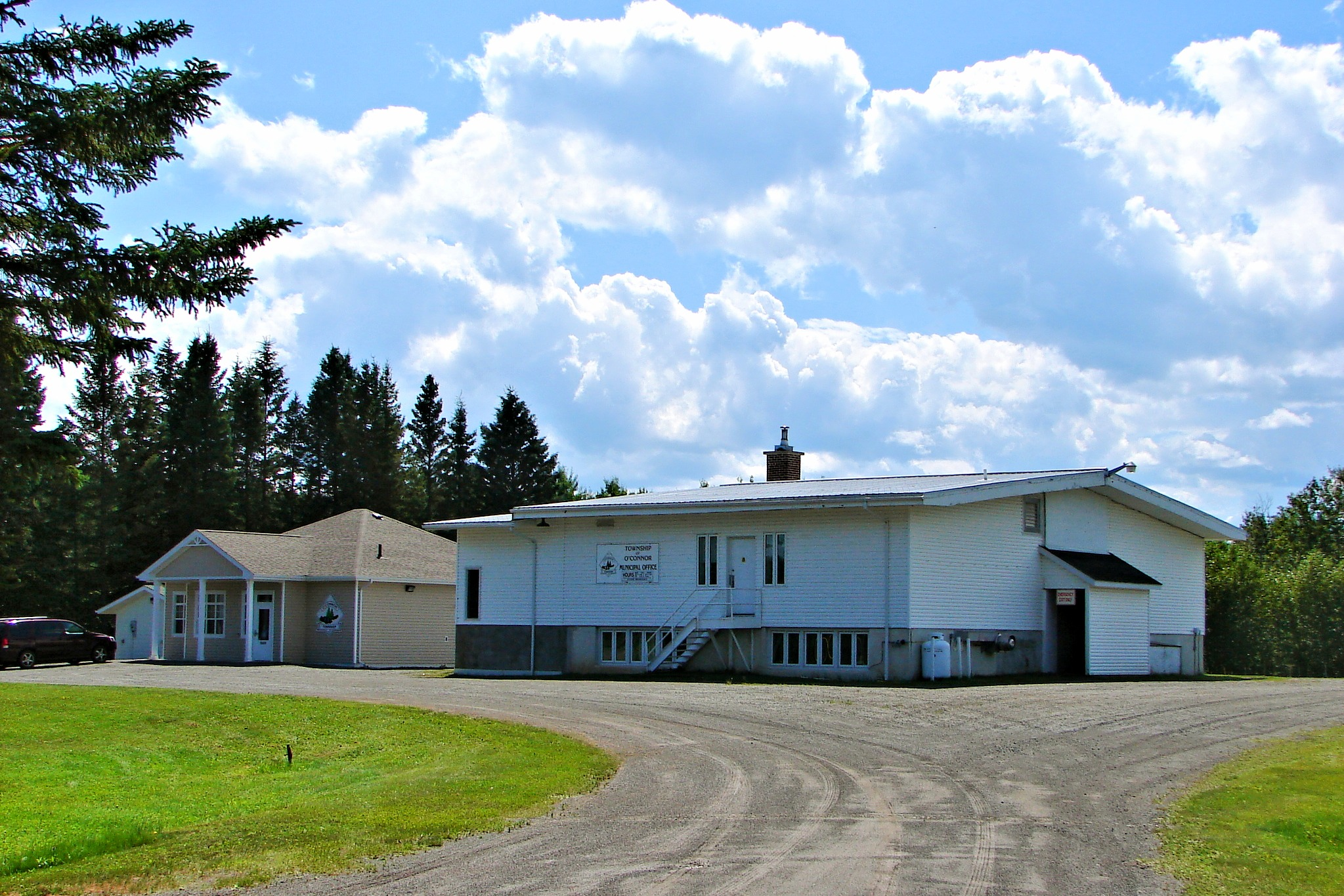
Municipal office of O'Connor Township

== Transportation ==
The municipality is served by highways 590 and 595, which intersect in the northern half of the municipality. Highway 590 connects the community to the Trans-Canada Highway (Highway 11/17) at Kakabeka Falls in neighbouring Oliver Paipoonge.

== See also ==
- List of townships in Ontario
