= Hurkett =

- Dispersed rural community
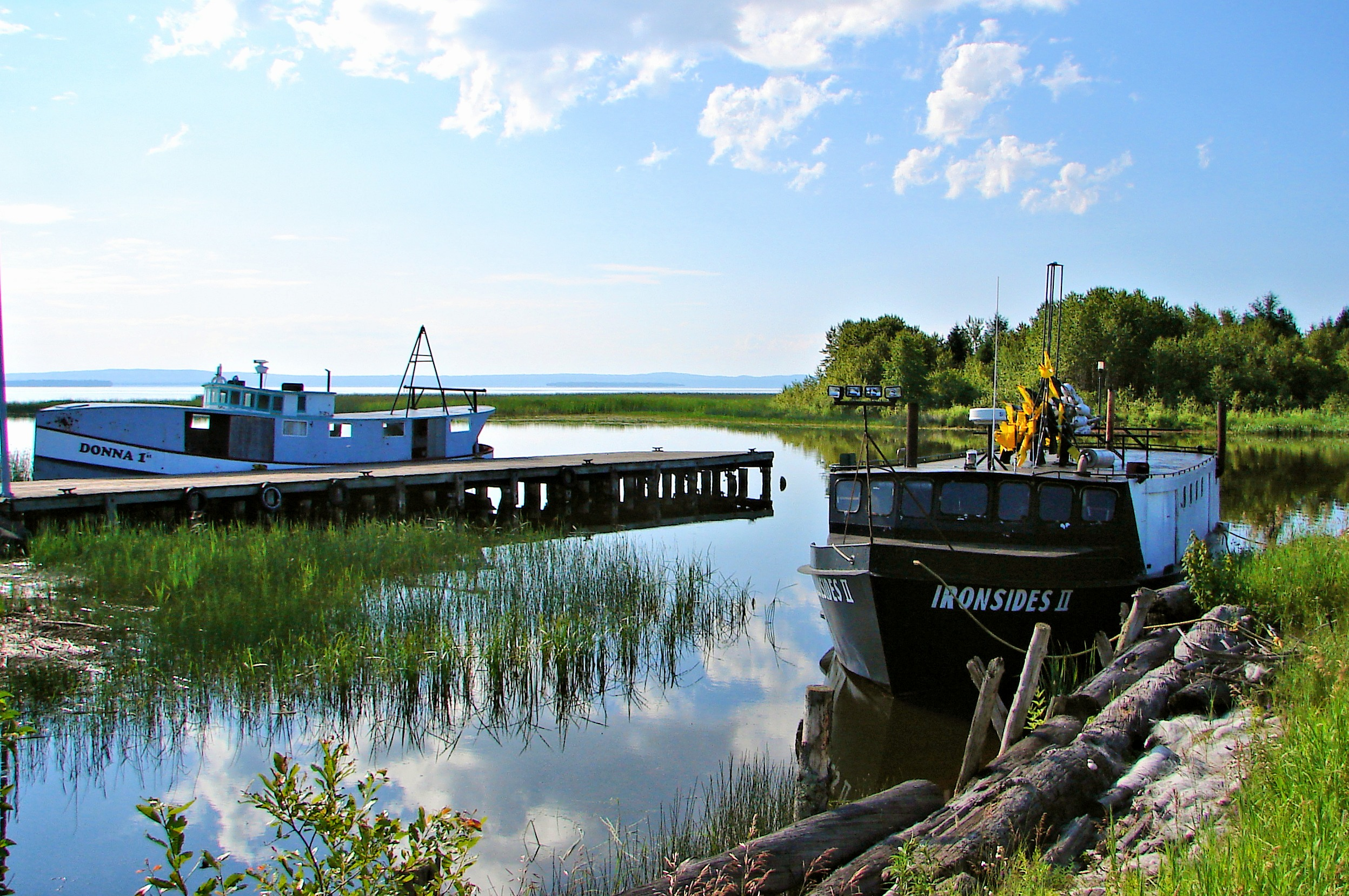
- Derelict harbour of Hurkett

- Location of Hurkett in Ontario
- Coordinates: 48°50′57″N 88°29′05″W
- Country: Canada
- Province: Ontario
- District: Thunder Bay

Area
  - Total: 52.65 km^{2} (20.33 sq mi)
- Elevation: 193 m (633 ft)

Population (2011)
  - Total: 236
  - Density: 4.48/km^{2} (11.6/sq mi)
- Time zone: UTC-5 (Eastern Time Zone)
  - Summer (DST): UTC-4 (Eastern Time Zone)
- Postal code: P0T
- Area code: 807

Hurkett is a dispersed rural community and unincorporated place in the Unorganized part of Thunder Bay District in northwestern Ontario, Canada. It is on Black Bay on the north shore of Lake Superior in geographic Stirling Township, and is on Ontario Highway 582, a short spur off Ontario Highway 17. Hurkett is a designated place served by a local services board, and has a population of 236.

== History ==
In 1902 Robert Nuttall of Port Arthur began to harvest ice at Wolf River Station for his Black Bay pound net business. With brothers Allen and Alonzo (A.W.) he constructed an ice-house at Hurkett Cove near the former native settlement of Cranberry (Chief's) Bay (Concession 1, lots 13 and 14). A trail connected this settlement with one at Dog Lake, and an unpublished report by fisherman Mark Peacock (A History of Dorion, 1901-1932, owned by the Nuttall family) stresses its role in colonization of the territory. When Robert left the fisheries, the business was managed by A.W. Nuttall who In 1919 employed 16 men for the winter fisheries of Black Bay. Other local fishermen were Joe Collins and Kate Morrow, and prior to the 1920's the Nipigon Bay Fish Company of Rossport maintained interests in the Hurkett fisheries.

== Demographics ==
In the 2021 Census of Population conducted by Statistics Canada, Hurkett had a population of 94 living in 51 of its 75 total private dwellings, a change of −56.1% from its 2016 population of 214. With a land area of 53.08 km^{2} (20.49 sq mi), it had a population density of 1.8/km^{2} (4.6/sq mi) in 2021.

Canada census – Hurkett community profile

	2011
Population	236 (-17.2% from 2006)
Land area	52.65 km^{2} (20.33 sq mi)
Population density	4.5/km^{2} (12/sq mi)
Median age	49.7 (M: 48.2, F: 50.2)
Private dwellings	121 (total)
Median household income

References: 2011

== See also ==
- List of unincorporated communities in Ontario
