= Esnagami Lake =

Lake in Ontario, Canada

- Location within Ontario
- Location: Ontario, Canada
- Coordinates: 50°19′23″N 86°50′29″W
- Basin countries: Canada
- Surface area: 69 km^{2} (27 sq mi)
- Shore length^{1}: 109 km (68 mi)
- ^{1} Shore length is not a well-defined measure.

Esnagami Lake is a lake in Thunder Bay District, Ontario, Canada, north of Nakina, Ontario, with numerous islands, rivers and bays containing brook trout, northern pike, perch, walleye and freshwater whitefish.
