= Pays Plat First Nation =

Pays Plat 51 Baagwaashiing Anishinaabek
- Indian reserve
- Pays Plat Indian Reserve No. 51
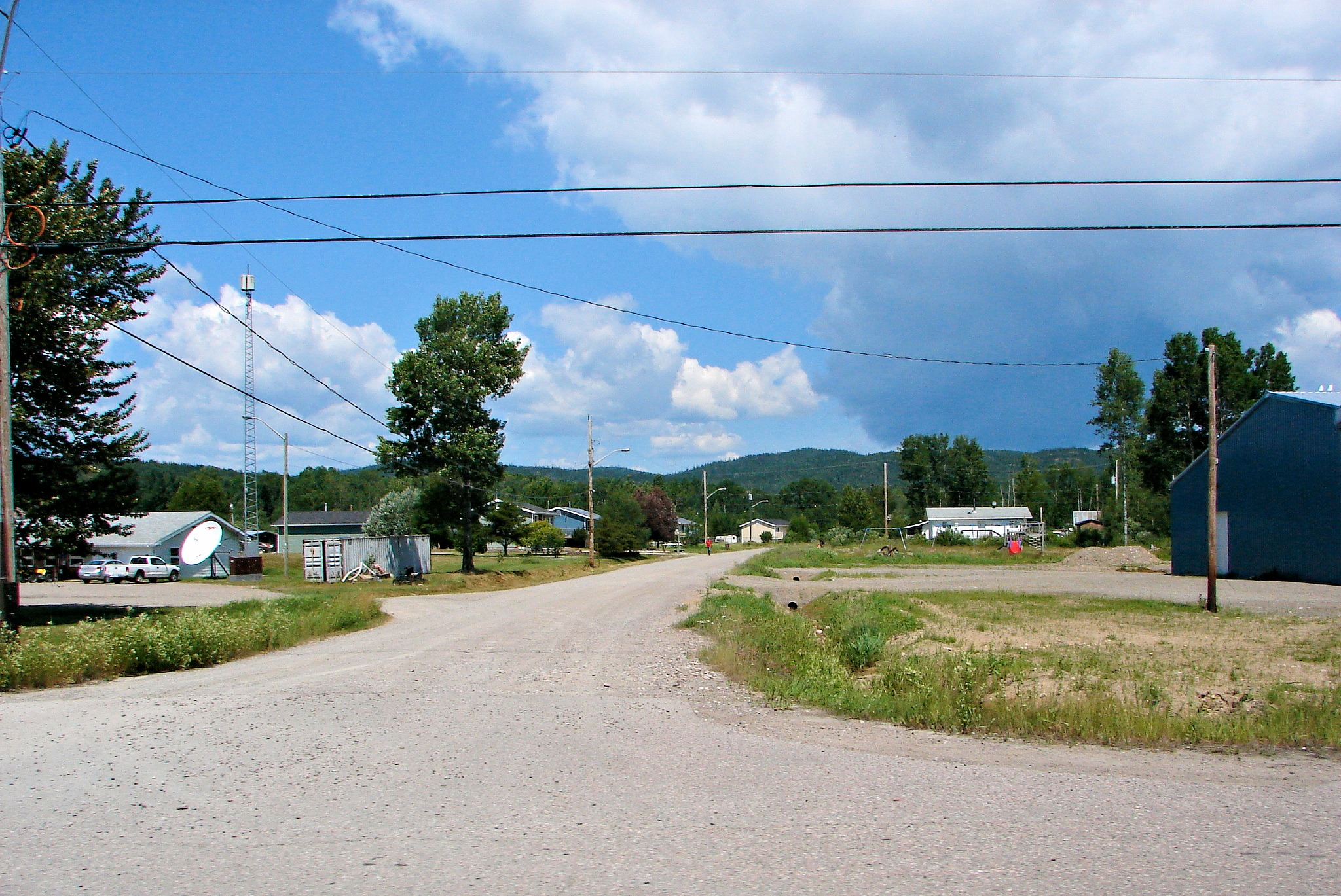

- Location within Ontario
- Coordinates: 48°53′N 87°34′W
- Country: Canada
- Province: Ontario
- District: Thunder Bay
- First Nation: Pays Plat

Area
  - Land: 2.19 km^{2} (0.85 sq mi)

Population (2011)
  - Total: 75
  - Density: 34.3/km^{2} (89/sq mi)

Pays Plat First Nation (Ojibway: Baagwaashiing Anishinaabek) is a small First Nation reserve community located near Rossport, Ontario, Canada, about 175 kilometres (109 mi) northeast of Thunder Bay. The Pays Plat 51 Reserve is in the boundaries of the territory described in the Robinson-Superior Treaty of 1850. The community is located along Highway 17.

== History ==
The Ojibway people living on the North Shore of Lake Superior (ancestors of Pays Plat First Nations people) survived by hunting, trapping, fishing, and gathering food. The area was heavily involved in the fur trade, and the ancestors living near what is now called Pays Plat were key in trapping for furs. Pays Plat was named by French traders and means flat land, named after the fact that it is flat land between two mountains. In Anishinaabemowin the community is known as Baagwaashiing which means "Where the water is shallow."

== Chief and Council ==
As of 2019, the Chief and Council are elected to four-year terms. The Pays Plat governance includes Chief David P. Mushquash, Councillor Real Bouchard, Councillor Matthew Goodchild, and Councillor Darlene Morriseau.
