= Netmizaaggamig Nishnaabeg =

Ojibwe First Nation band government

Coordinates: 48°41′56″N 85°37′01″W

- Band No. 195
- People: Ojibwe
- Province: Ontario

Land
- Other reserves: Pic Mobert North; Pic Mobert South
- Land area: 1.168 km^{2} (0.451 sq mi)

Population (2021)
- On reserve: 352
- On other land: 3
- Off reserve: 709
- Total population: 1064

Government
- Chief: Johanna Desmoulin
- Council: Christopher Bananish; Theresa Bananish; Hannah Desmoulin; Jeffery Desmoulin; Clyde Jacobs; Louis Kwissiwa; Thurston Kwissiwa; Jessica McWatch; Vernon McWatch

Tribal Council
- Nokiiwin Tribal Council

Website
- picmobert.com

Netmizaaggamig Nishnaabeg (formerly Pic Mobert First Nation) is an Ojibwe First Nation band government in Northwestern Ontario, Canada.

The First Nation has two reserves: Pic Mobert North and Pic Mobert South, both located approximately 53 kilometres (33 mi) east of Marathon, Ontario, along the eastern shores of White Lake. The community has year-round road access.

As of October 2021, Netmizaaggamig Nishnaabeg had a registered population of 1064 members, 352 of whom live on-reserve.

== Governance ==
Netmizaaggamig Nishnaabeg is currently led by Chief Johanna Desmoulin, and is governed by a Chi-Naaknigewin (Community Constitution) approved in 2016. The Nation is a member of the Nokiiwin Tribal Council and of the Anishinabek Nation.

== History ==
The land that now encompasses Netmizaaggamig Nishnaabeg has been inhabited by the Anishinabek since at least 1876. The first Hudson's Bay Company post in the area was established in 1850, and the Anishinabek were noted to have participated in the fur trade there. In the 1940s, eight prisoner of war camps were established near the reserve.
