= Lappe, Ontario =

Lappe
- Unincorporated place
- Location of Lappe in Ontario
- Coordinates: 48°34′44″N 89°21′31″W
- Country: Canada
- Province: Ontario
- District: Thunder Bay
- Elevation: 421 m (1,381 ft)

Population (2006)
  - Total: 1,465
- Time zone: UTC-5 (Eastern Time Zone)
  - Summer (DST): UTC-4 (Eastern Time Zone)
- Postal code FSA: P7G
- Area code: 807

Lappe is a community in the Unorganized part of Thunder Bay District, Ontario, Canada. It is within and at the southern border of geographic Gorham Township, and lies approximately 20 kilometres northwest of Thunder Bay at the junction of Ontario Highway 589 and Ontario Highway 591.

An unincorporated designated place served by the East Gorham local services board, Lappe had a population of 1,465 in the Canada 2006 Census, an increase of 4.2% since 2001. It is the most populated designated place in Ontario.

Pioneer settlers reported that the community received its name in the following way. As they travelled north from the small community of Kivikoski they were called Laplanders (northerners) and the community they settled called "Lappi", the Finnish word for Lapland. When the community acquired postal service in the 1930s, a bureaucratic error distorted the spelling to the present "Lappe".

== Demographics ==
In the 2021 Census of Population conducted by Statistics Canada, Lappe had a population of 1,434 living in 589 of its 722 total private dwellings, a change of −0.1% from its 2016 population of 1,436. With a land area of 145.62 km^{2} (56.22 sq mi), it had a population density of 9.8/km^{2} (25.5/sq mi) in 2021.
