= Upsala, Ontario =

Upsala
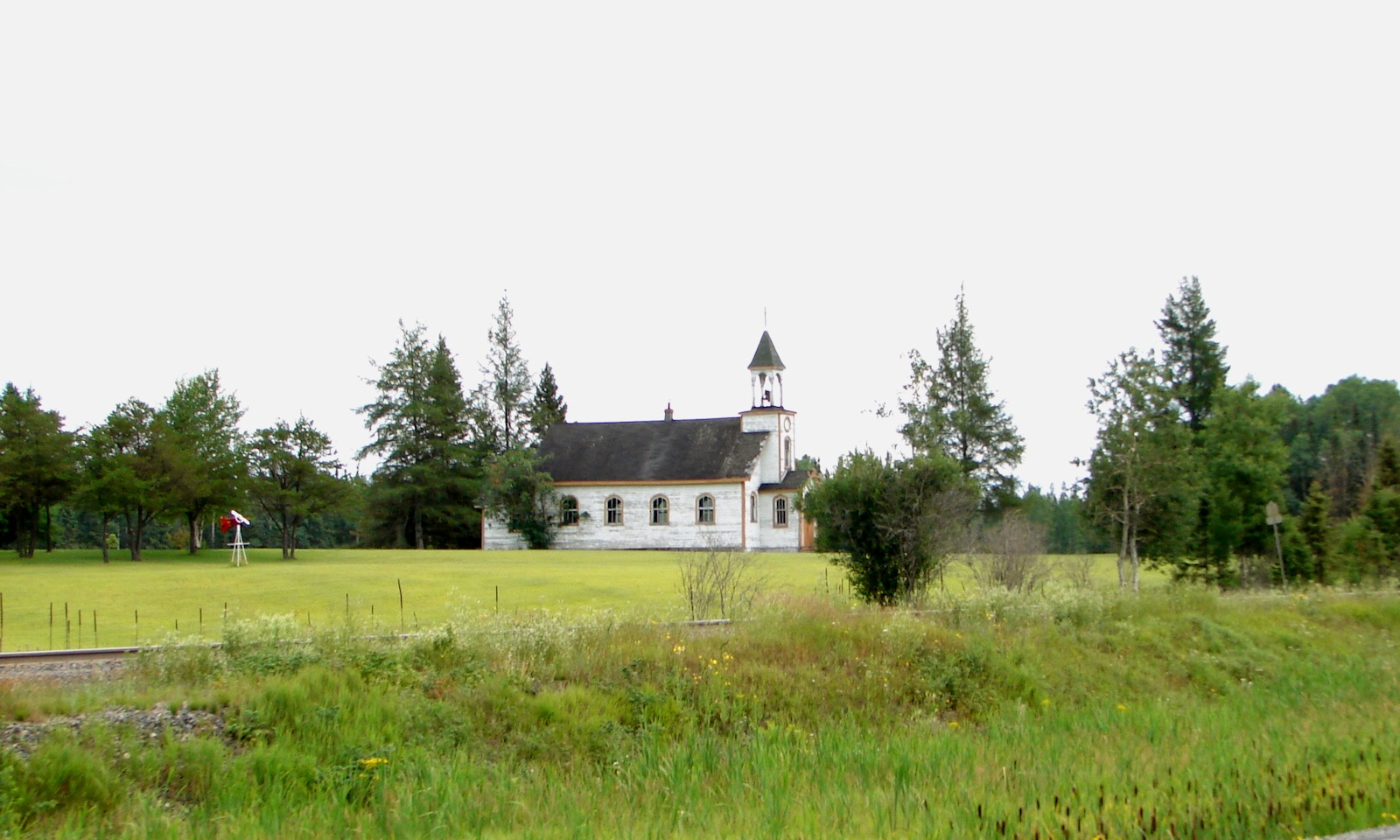

- Location within Ontario
- Coordinates: 49°03′N 90°28′W
- Country: Canada
- Province: Ontario
- District: Thunder Bay

Upsala is an unincorporated community and geographic township in Thunder Bay District in northwestern Ontario, Canada. It is located along the Trans-Canada Highway, Highway 17, 142 kilometres (88 mi) west of Thunder Bay, part of the Unorganized Thunder Bay District.

It was named after the city of Uppsala in Sweden.

When established in 1882, Upsala was an important fuel and water stop for trains travelling on the then newly constructed Canadian Pacific Railway system.

The Upsala area is situated just north of Lac des Mille Lacs, which was an important fur trade waterway and today is home to many fishing and hunting resorts.

== History ==
The town of Upsala, in Northwestern Ontario, was established in 1882 in the township of Upsala, to serve as a station stop on the new Canadian Pacific Railway. It took its name from the township, which in turn was named for the Swedish city of Uppsala, reflecting the Nordic background of many area immigrants.

In 1914 a survey of the township was completed, but the planned settlement was interrupted by the outbreak of World War One. The area was finally opened for settlement in 1922, at the request of employees of the Canadian Pacific Railway, who appreciated its possibilities.

Pioneer settlers included Hans Nordal, H. D. Wiseman, Hugo Carlson, C. Nordstrom, S. Kenuck, O. Hakanson, A. Greenland, G. R. Johnston and Elmer and Esther Aho. The first school in the town was established in 1925. Sybil Nordal was one of the pupils in the first class. Entertainment revolved around the “house party set”: neighbours who gathered in each other’s homes or at the schoolhouse to dance to the fiddle. A forest fire in 1928 threatened the township and burned the Aho home.

The Women’s Institute was organized by Mrs. D. B. Frazer in 1935 with charter members Mrs. Kailik and Mrs. Greenlund. In 1939 the Agricultural Society was established in a hall located half a mile east of Upsala on property owned by C. McGuire. The society arranged to purchase fertilizer in quantity at low prices, and sponsored potato growing competitions. Mr. Harrison, the proprietor of the Victoria Hotel in Fort William, donated a cup called the Harrison Trophy which became the property of three time winner, Harold Johnston, the son of pioneer farmers.

By the 1930s the town consisted of many homes on both sides of the tracks and alongside roads. Until 1937, when the highway went in, there were no roads in the centre of town, just paths between the buildings on the north and south sides of the CPR tracks. The station and pump house and the Catholic church were north of the tracks, with the cemetery further back. To the south there was the Upsala Inn, J. R. Ellat Store, SS#1 (the school), the community hall and Lake Milton. Mail and supplies were delivered to the station on trains as they came through.

Until 1937, all travel to the town was by rail. Then a section of the Trans-Canada Highway was built on the site of a wagon trail in the town, connecting it to the twin cities of Fort William and Port Arthur (now one city, Thunder Bay).
