= Unorganized Thunder Bay District =

Unorganized Thunder Bay
- Unorganized area
- Thunder Bay, Unorganized
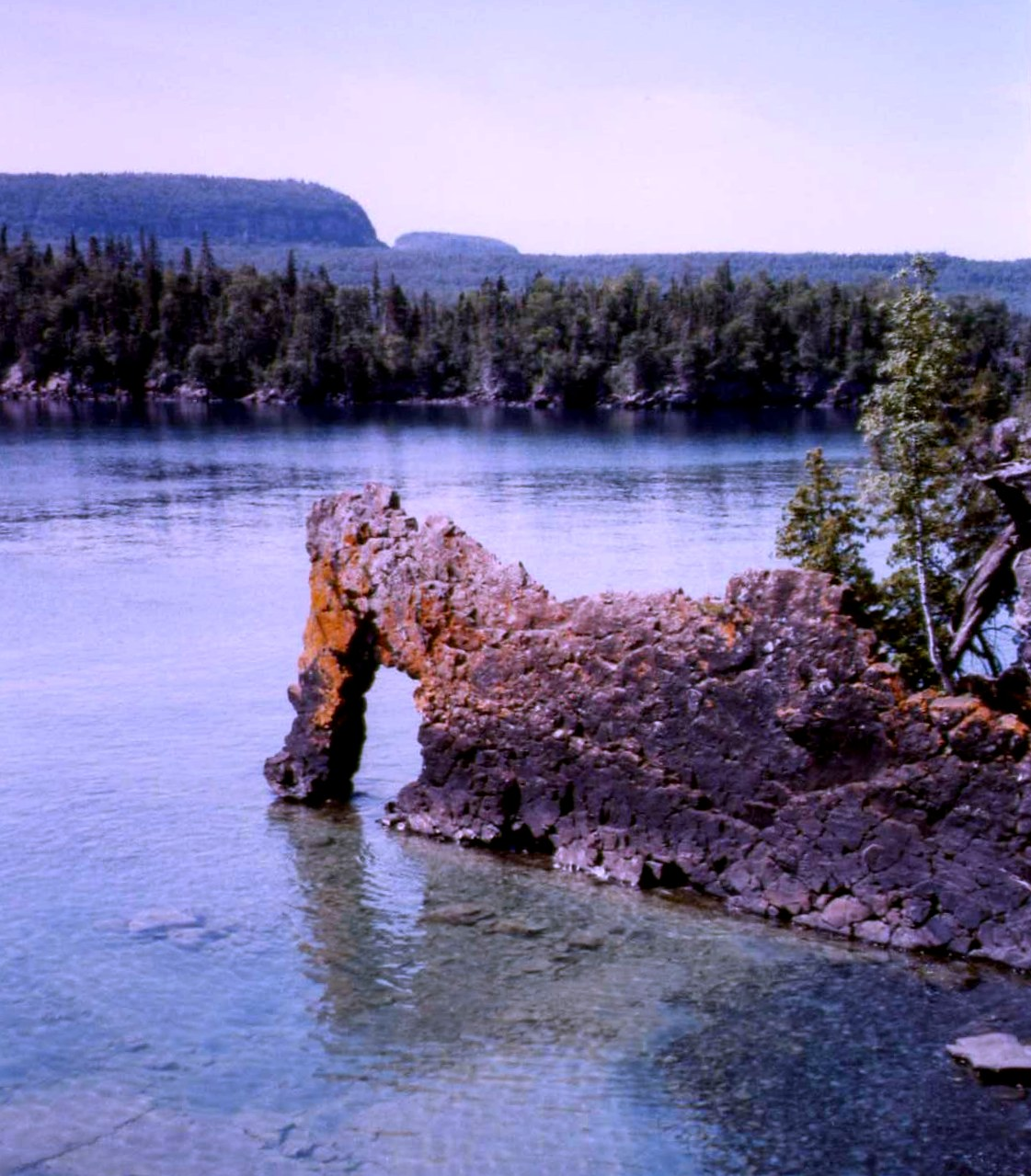
- Sleeping Giant Provincial Park

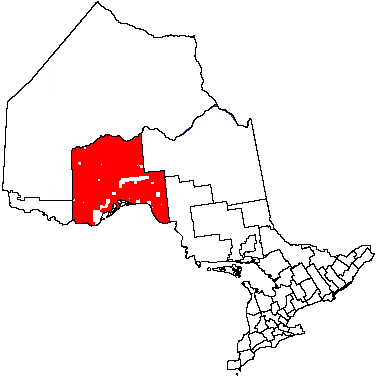
- Coordinates: 50°00′N 88°00′W
- Country: Canada
- Province: Ontario
- District: Thunder Bay

Government
  - Federal ridings: Kenora—Kiiwetinoong; Thunder Bay—Rainy River; Thunder Bay—Superior North
  - Prov. ridings: Algoma—Manitoulin; Kiiwetinoong; Thunder Bay—Atikokan; Thunder Bay—Superior North

Area
  - Land: 97,009.80 km^{2} (37,455.69 sq mi)

Population (2016)
  - Total: 5,872
  - Density: 0.1/km^{2} (0.26/sq mi)

Time zones
- East of 90° west: UTC-05:00 (Eastern)
  - Summer (DST): UTC-04:00 (EDT)
- West of 90° west: UTC-06:00 (Central)
  - Summer (DST): UTC-05:00 (CDT)
- Postal Code FSA: P0T
- Area code: 807

Unorganized Thunder Bay District is an unorganized area in northwestern Ontario, Canada in Thunder Bay District. It comprises all parts of the district that are not part of an incorporated municipality or a First Nations reserve.

Most of the territory is within the Eastern Time Zone, but the part west of the 90th meridian is in the Central Time Zone.

== Geography ==
=== Communities with Local services board ===
- Armstrong
- East Gorham
- Hurkett
- Kaministiquia
- Lappe
- Rossport
- Shebandowan

=== Other communities ===
- Auden
- Burchell Lake
- Collins
- English River (on boundary with Kenora District)
- Finmark
- Hemlo
- Heron Bay
- Kashabowie
- Nolalu
- Ombabika
- Pays Plat
- Raith
- Savant Lake
- Shabaqua
- Shabaqua Corners
- Silver Islet
- Silver Mountain
- Sorrell Lake
- Suomi
- Upsala

== History ==
Gold was noted in the area since 1869, but it wasn't until Peter Moses from Heron Bay, Ontario discovered additional gold that prospectors flocked to the area. In 1947, Dr. J. Williams and Moses staked 11 claims, which became the Lake Superior Mining Corporation. However, not much development took place until 1979, when Don and David McKinnon, along with John Larche, staked claims in Hemlo and the Manitouwadge area. The Williams Mine started operation in 1985, and produced 445,320 ounces of gold from a 2.45 meter wide ore body. The Golden Giant Mine produced 446,858 ounces in 1994 from a quartz sericite schist host rock. The David Bell Mines produced 204,251 ounces in 1994. The Hemlo gold mines had produced more than 6,000,000 ounces of gold by 1992.

== Demographics ==
Canada census – Thunder Bay, Unorganized community profile

	2016	2011
Population	5872 (-0.6% from 2011)	5909 (-10.3% from 2006)
Land area	97,009.80 km^{2} (37,455.69 sq mi)	97,007.34 km^{2} (37,454.74 sq mi)
Population density	0.1/km^{2} (0.26/sq mi)	0.1/km^{2} (0.26/sq mi)
Median age	51.4 (M: 52.0, F: 50.9)
Private dwellings	6130 (total)	5782 (total)
Median household income	$70,886

References: 2016 2011

Population trend:

- Population in 2011: 5909
- Population in 2006: 6585
- Population in 2001: 6223
- Population in 1996: 8460 (or 6534 when adjusted to 2001 boundaries)
  - Land area: 105,454.69 square kilometres (40,716.28 sq mi)
- Population in 1991: 8168

== Parks in Unorganized Thunder Bay ==
Provincial parks in Unorganized Thunder Bay include:

- Albany River Provincial Park
- Kopka River Provincial Park
- Neys Provincial Park
- Rainbow Falls Provincial Park
- Sleeping Giant Provincial Park
- Steel River Provincial Park
- Wabakimi Provincial Park

It is also home to one National Park of Canada: Pukaskwa National Park.

== Transportation ==
Via Rail's The Canadian serves the Unorganized Thunder District at the communities of Flindt Landing, Mud River, Ferland, and Auden.

== See also ==
- Cobalt silver rush
- Greenstone, Ontario
- List of townships in Ontario
- Matachewan, Ontario
- Porcupine Gold Rush
- Red Lake, Ontario
