= Kaministiquia =

Community in Thunder Bay District, Ontario

Coordinates: 48.5348°N 89.5703°W

Kaministiquia (/ˌkæməˈnɪstɪkwɑː/) is a community in the Canadian province of Ontario, located in the Thunder Bay District on Highway 102 approximately 30 kilometres west of Thunder Bay. A designated place served by a local services board, Kaministiquia had a population of 587 in the Canada 2006 Census.

Kaministiquia is located at the convergence of the Dog and Mattawan Rivers. It was formerly served by the Grand Trunk Pacific Railway's Lake Superior branch, but the line near Kaministiquia has been abandoned.

== Demographics ==
In the 2021 Census of Population conducted by Statistics Canada, Kaministiquia had a population of 643 living in 253 of its 278 total private dwellings, a change of 2.9% from its 2016 population of 625. With a land area of 136.95 km^{2} (52.88 sq mi), it had a population density of 4.7/km^{2} (12.2/sq mi) in 2021.
