= Neebing =

- Municipality (single-tier)
- Municipality of Neebing
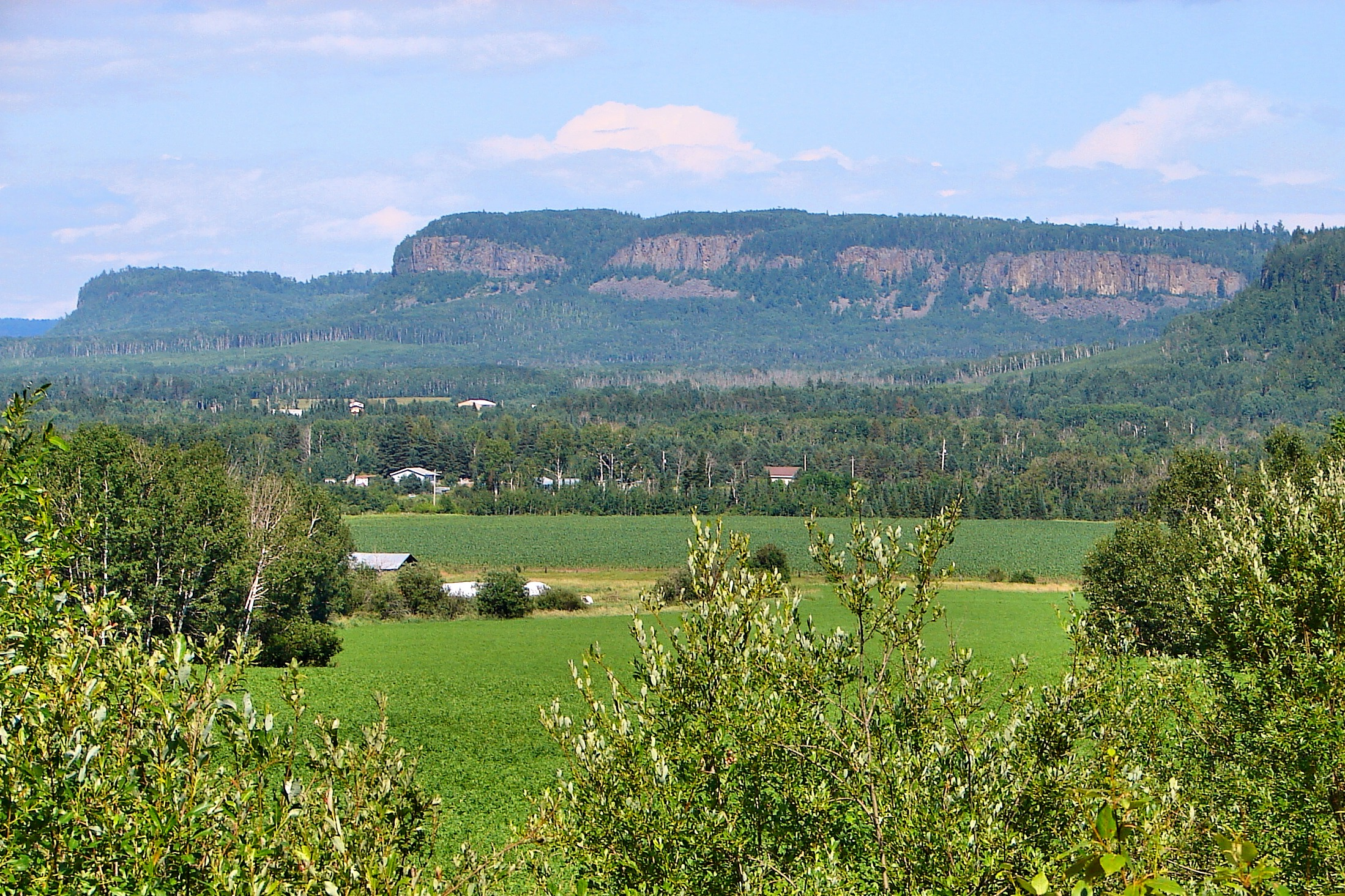
- Rural scene of Neebing with the Nor'Wester Mountains in the background

- Location within Ontario
- Coordinates: 48°11′N 89°28′W
- Country: Canada
- Province: Ontario
- District: Thunder Bay
- Incorporated: 1881

Government
  - Mayor: Mark Thibert
  - Fed. riding: Thunder Bay—Rainy River
  - Prov. riding: Thunder Bay—Atikokan

Area
  - Land: 873.78 km^{2} (337.37 sq mi)

Population (2021)
  - Total: 2,241
  - Density: 2.6/km^{2} (6.7/sq mi)
- Time zone: UTC-5 (EST)
  - Summer (DST): UTC-4 (EDT)
- Forward sortation area: P7L
- Area code: 807
- Website: www.neebing.org

Neebing is a municipality in the Canadian province of Ontario, located in the Thunder Bay District immediately south of the city of Thunder Bay. It is part of Thunder Bay's Census Metropolitan Area.

== History ==
Neebing comprises the former geographic townships of Blake, Crooks, Pardee, Pearson and Scoble. It was incorporated in its current form on January 1, 1999. It should not be confused with the geographic township of Neebing, which was amalgamated into the City of Thunder Bay in 1970.

The Municipality of Neebing was incorporated in 1881 by the Legislative Assembly of Ontario. It included Neebing township, Neebing Additional township, Blake, Crooks and Pardee townships. In 1892 all of Neebing Additional township and a large portion of Neebing township was removed to form the City of Fort William. In 1970 the remainder of Neebing township was also removed from the Municipality of Neebing, leaving it with only the name.

== Geography ==
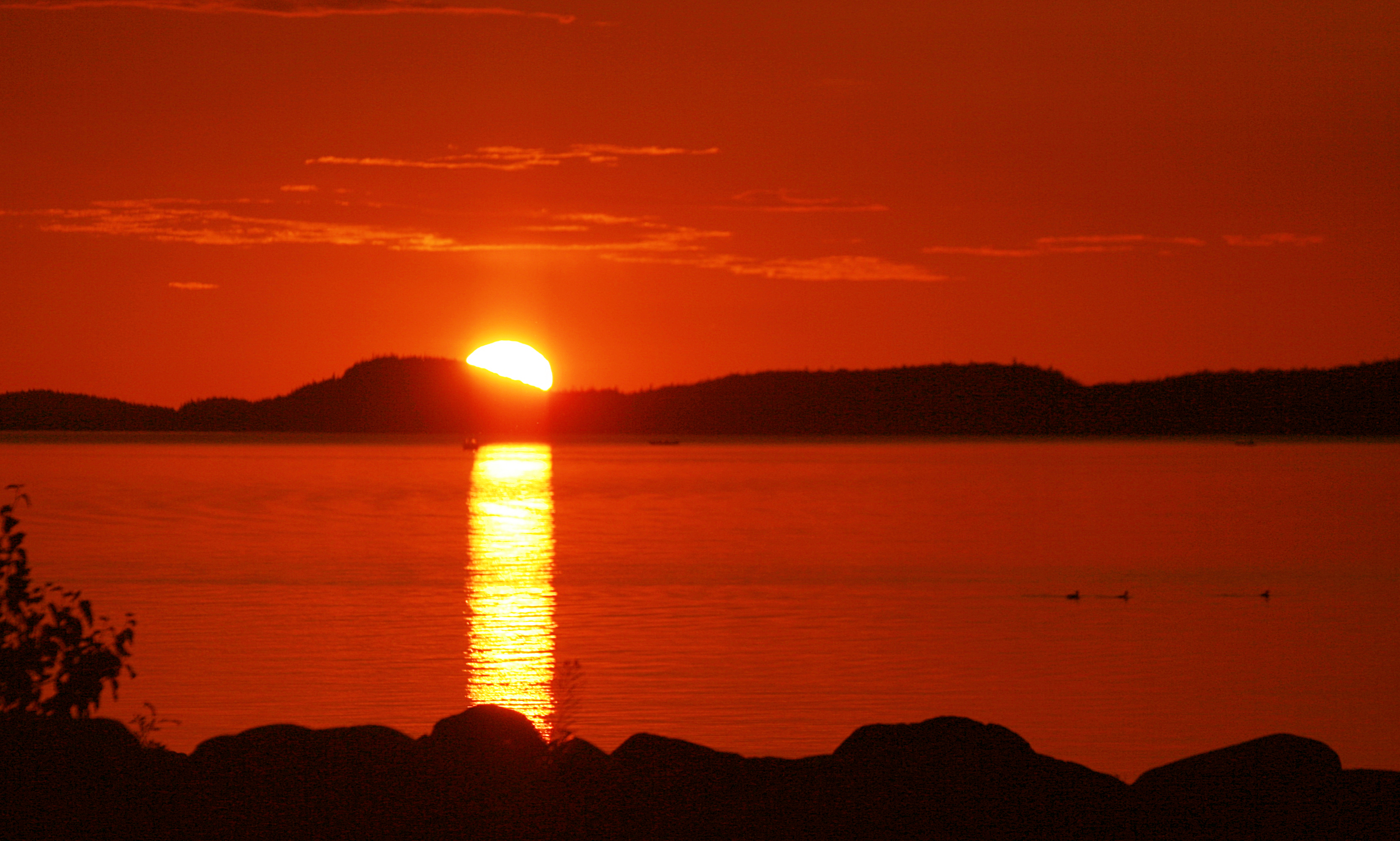
Little Trout Bay at sunrise

Little Trout Bay (petite baie trout in French) of Lake Superior is protected as a conservation area. Anglers visit all year round, including ice fishing in winter. The area has picnic facilities and hiking trails with look-outs.

=== Communities ===
The municipality includes the communities of Cloud Bay, Jarvis River, Moose Hill, Scoble West, and Wamsley.

== Demographics ==
In the 2021 Census of Population conducted by Statistics Canada, Neebing had a population of 2,241 living in 942 of its 1,205 total private dwellings, a change of 9.1% from its 2016 population of 2,055. With a land area of 873.78 km^{2} (337.37 sq mi), it had a population density of 2.6/km^{2} (6.6/sq mi) in 2021.

Canada census – Neebing community profile

	2021	2016	2011
Population	2,241 (+9.1% from 2016)	2,055 (+3.5% from 2011)	1,986 (-9.1% from 2006)
Land area	873.78 km^{2} (337.37 sq mi)	877.27 km^{2} (338.72 sq mi)	877.60 km^{2} (338.84 sq mi)
Population density	2.6/km^{2} (6.7/sq mi)	2.3/km^{2} (6.0/sq mi)	2.3/km^{2} (6.0/sq mi)
Median age	48.8 (M: 48.8, F: 48.8)	48.5 (M: 49.3, F: 47.4)
Private dwellings	1,205 (total) 942 (occupied)	1,166 (total)	1,096 (total)
Median household income	$94,000	$87,424

References: 2021 2016 2011

Historical census populations – Neebing, Ontario

Year	Pop.	±%
1881	690	—
1891	2,176	+215.4%
1901	101	−95.4%
1911	247	+144.6%
1921	667	+170.0%
1931	1,414	+112.0%
1941	2,586	+82.9%
1951	3,509	+35.7%

Year	Pop.	±%
1956	4,198	+19.6%
1961	4,404	+4.9%
1966	4,064	−7.7%
1971	524	−87.1%
1976	602	+14.9%
1981	811	+34.7%
1986	868	+7.0%
1991	889	+2.4%

Year	Pop.	±%
1996	1,021	+14.8%
2001	2,049	+100.7%
2006	2,184	+6.6%
2011	1,986	−9.1%
2016	2,055	+3.5%
2021	2,241	+9.1%

Population counts are not adjusted for boundary changes.
Source: Statistics Canada

== See also ==
- List of townships in Ontario
