= Shebandowan =

Community in Thunder Bay District, Ontario

Coordinates: 48.633°N 90.067°W

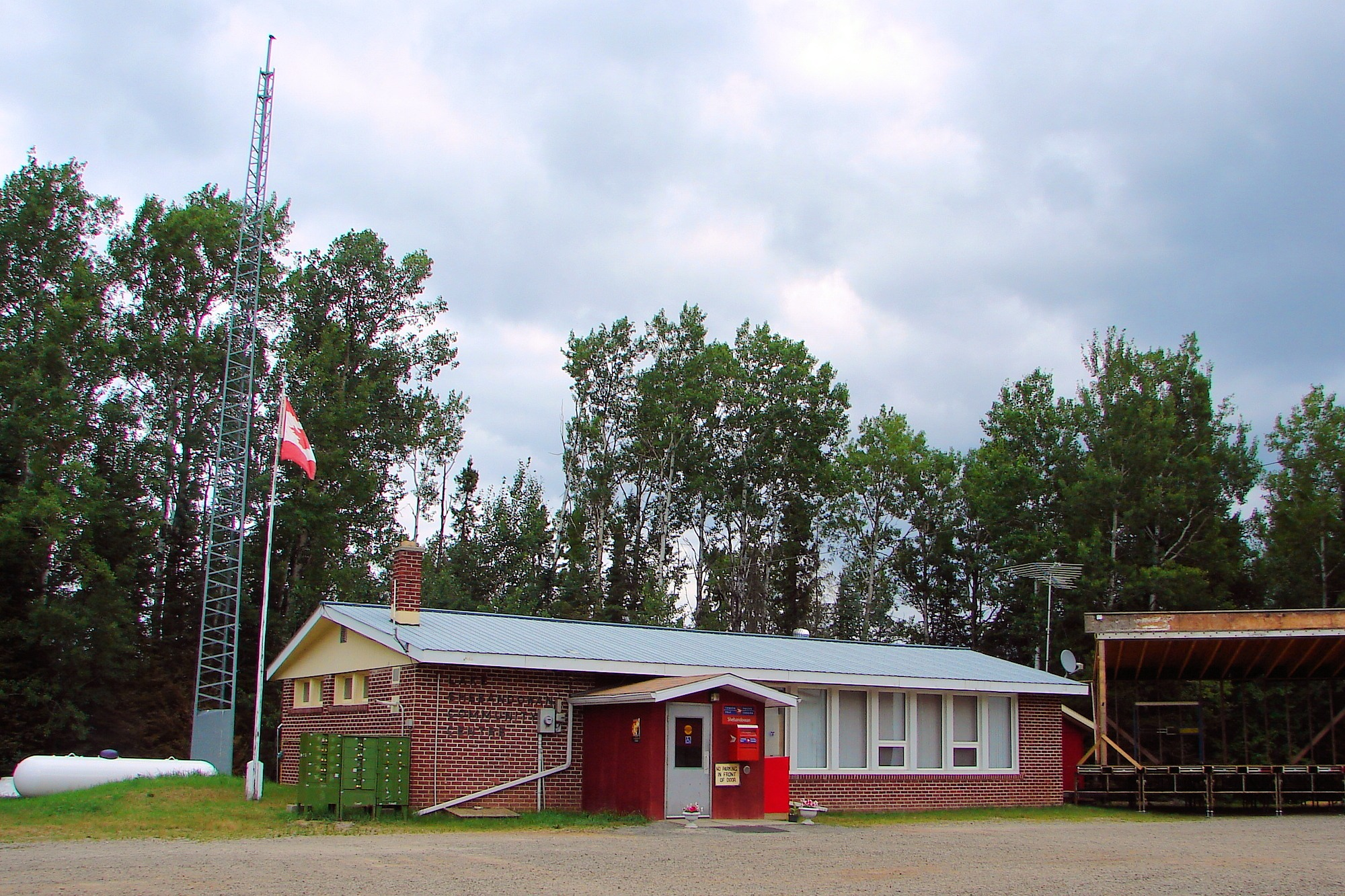
Community centre in Shebandowan

Shebandowan is an unincorporated community in the Canadian province of Ontario, located on Highway 11 in the Thunder Bay District.

The community is administered by a local services board, and is counted as part of the Unorganized Thunder Bay District in Canadian census data. Home of the Shebandowan Natives Golden Hockey League team.
