= Oliver Paipoonge =

- Municipality (single-tier)
- Municipality of Oliver Paipoonge
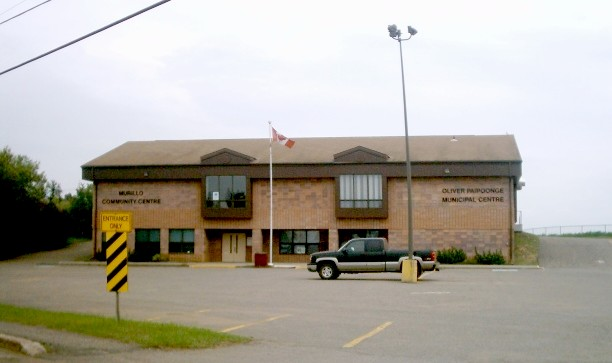
- Oliver Paipoonge Municipal Hall

- Location within Ontario
- Coordinates: 48°23′24″N 89°31′12″W
- Country: Canada
- Province: Ontario
- District: Thunder Bay
- CMA: Thunder Bay
- Formed: 1 January 1998

Government
  - Mayor: Lucy Kloosterhuis
  - Fed. riding: Thunder Bay—Rainy River
  - Prov. riding: Thunder Bay—Atikokan

Area
  - Land: 350.51 km^{2} (135.33 sq mi)

Population (2021)
  - Total: 6,035
  - Density: 17.2/km^{2} (45/sq mi)
- Time zone: UTC-5 (EST)
  - Summer (DST): UTC-4 (EDT)
- Postal code: P0T 1W0 Kakabeka Falls; P0T 2G0 Murillo
- Area code: 807
- Website: www.oliverpaipoonge.ca

Oliver Paipoonge is a township in the Canadian province of Ontario, located directly west of the city of Thunder Bay. The municipality was formed on January 1, 1998, with the amalgamation of the former Township of Oliver and Township of Paipoonge.

The municipality is part of Thunder Bay's Census Metropolitan Area.

== Geography ==
The geography of Oliver Paipoonge transitions from river valleys in the south, through flat open farmland and rolling hills in the central areas, to the rough Canadian Shield in the north. The most notable geographic feature is Kakabeka Falls, located on the western edge of the municipality in Kakabeka Falls Provincial Park. Besides small communities, the municipality is mostly agricultural or rural.

=== Communities ===
The municipality contains several communities within its boundaries, including:

- Baird
- Carters Corners
- Harstone
- Kakabeka Falls
- Lee
- McCluskeys Corners
- Millar
- Murillo
- Rosslyn
- Slate River Valley
- Stanley
- Twin City

Murillo contains a post office, a store, a municipal hall, and a Public Library. New commercial enterprises, located in the Rubin Industrial Park, include a well driller, self-storage facility, a forest products manufacturer, and the Rural Roots child care facility. Each year the village hosts the Murillo Fall Fair, which features chariot races.

The village is the location of the government offices for the Municipality of Oliver Paipoonge as well as the Oliver Paipoonge Police and the Lakehead Rural Planning Board.

Murillo was originally a water stop on the Canadian Pacific Railway (CPR). The stop was named after the Spanish painter Bartolomé Estéban Murillo, as the CPR was at that time using the names of painters to name the many new communities springing up along its trans-Canadian line.

Rosslyn contains numerous commercial enterprises and is home to approximately 1,200 people and the Paipoonge Museum. A golf course and housing subdivision, named King George's Park, are currently being developed in a former gravel pit. There is also a skating rink here, and a community centre and Public Library beside it.

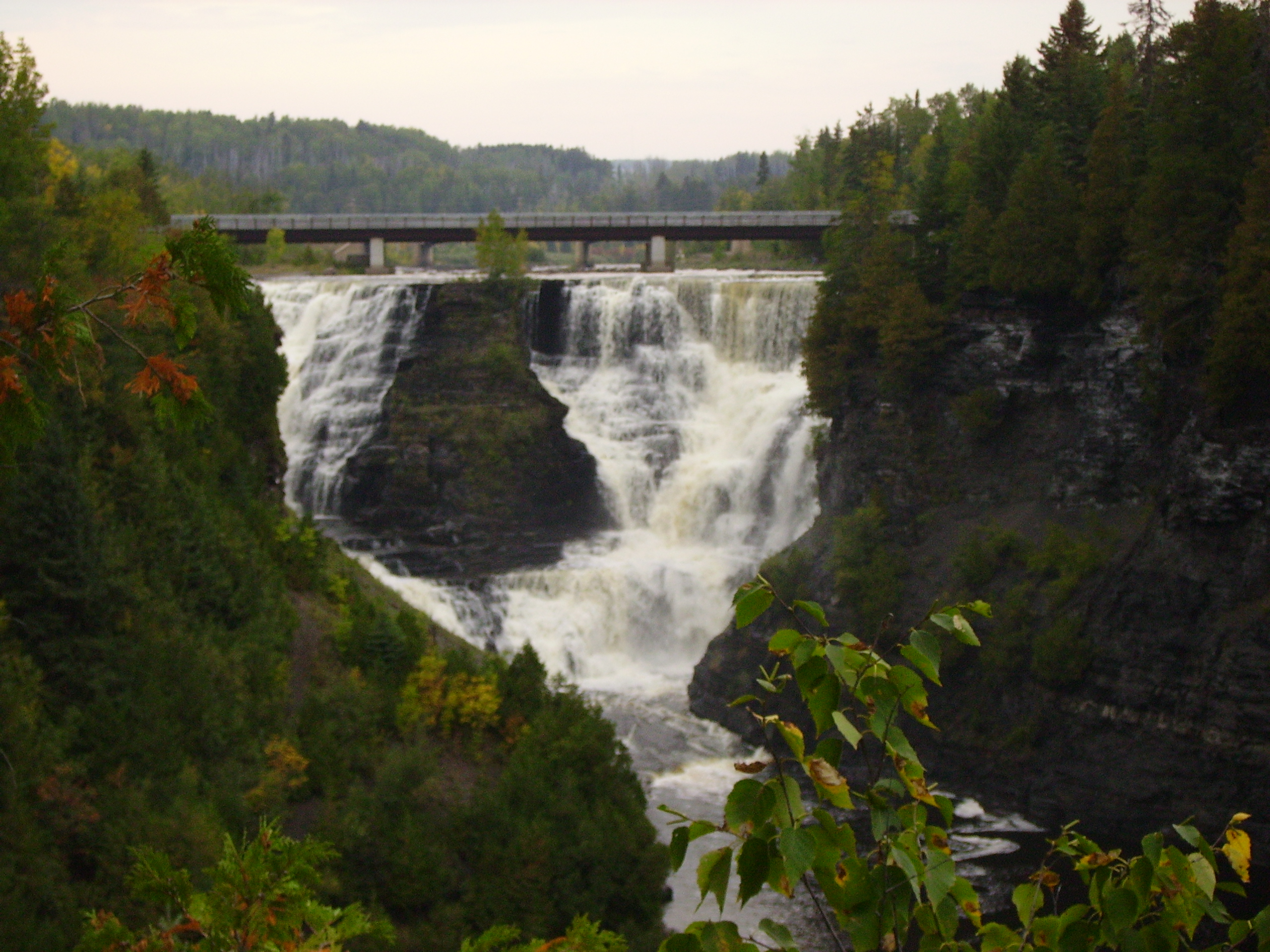
Kakabeka Falls

Kakabeka Falls takes its name from the nearby Kakabeka Falls waterfall. The Lauber Arboretum is located in the community.

As Kakabeka Falls' economy is based on tourism, its main street is lined with tourist oriented businesses such as hotels, restaurants, and camping sites. A three-day street fair is hosted in the village every August. Kakabeka Falls has a public school, called Kakabeka Falls Elementary School, located on the community's main street.

== Demographics ==
In the 2021 Census of Population conducted by Statistics Canada, Oliver Paipoonge had a population of 6,035 living in 2,323 of its 2,390 total private dwellings, a change of 1.9% from its 2016 population of 5,922. With a land area of 350.51 km^{2} (135.33 sq mi), it had a population density of 17.2/km^{2} (44.6/sq mi) in 2021.

According to the 2016 census, 51.2% of Oliver Paipoonge's population were male and 48.8% were female. Children under five accounted for approximately 5.1% of the resident population of Oliver Paipoonge. This compares with 5.2% in Ontario as a whole.

In mid-2001, 9.7% of the resident population in Oliver Paipoonge were of retirement age (65 and over for males and females) compared with 13.2% in Canada. The average age was 37.9 years of age comparing to 37.6 years of age for all of Canada.

Canada census – Oliver Paipoonge community profile

	2021	2016	2011
Population	6,035 (+1.9% from 2016)	5,922 (+3.3% from 2011)	5,732 (-0.4% from 2006)
Land area	350.51 km^{2} (135.33 sq mi)	350.91 km^{2} (135.49 sq mi)	350.96 km^{2} (135.51 sq mi)
Population density	17.2/km^{2} (45/sq mi)	16.9/km^{2} (44/sq mi)	16.3/km^{2} (42/sq mi)
Median age	46.0 (M: 46.4, F: 46.0)	45.4 (M: 45.7, F: 45.0)	43.8 (M: 44.1, F: 43.5)
Private dwellings	2,390 (total) 2,323 (occupied)	2,289 (total)	2,149 (total)
Median household income	$108,000	$96,981

References: 2021 2016 2011

Historical census populations – Oliver Paipoonge
Year	Pop.	±%
1996	5,907	—
2001	5,862	−0.8%
2006	5,757	−1.8%
2011	5,732	−0.4%
2016	5,922	+3.3%
2021	6,035	+1.9%
Source: Statistics Canada

== Economy ==
Oliver Paipoonge's primary industry is agriculture, followed with tourism focused around Kakabeka Falls and forest products manufacturing in Murillo and Rosslyn. Many residents commute to work either to Thunder Bay or the surrounding woodlands.

== Government ==
The municipal office of Oliver Paipoonge is located in the village of Murillo. The current mayor of Oliver Paipoonge is Lucia Kloosterhuis; first elected as mayor in 2003, having previously served as a councillor in both Oliver Paipoonge and the former Township of Paipoonge. The first female elected as mayor in Oliver Township was Iris Calvert, in 1991. Previously, the Municipality of Paipoonge had not elected a female as mayor.

== Sites of interest ==
Each year Kakabeka Falls hosts a street fair, Murillo hosts the Murillo Fall Fair, the Slate River area hosts the Slate River Ploughing Match.

There is one museum site consisting of the Duke Hunt Museum, The Heritage Village, Russ's Garage and 2 Brill Buses in the municipality called Oliver Paipoonge Heritage Park located on Highway 61. (ophp.ca) It is open weekends from May to September and hosts a variety of special events. Lauber Arboretum is a private collection.

== Transportation ==
The municipality is served by three major highways. Highways 61 and 130 are located in the southeast corner of the municipality and serves as the backbone of the Slate River Valley, an agricultural community. Highway 130 connects to the Trans-Canada Highway (Highway 11/17) at Rosslyn, the largest settlement. It also serves as the main street for Kakabeka Falls. Approximately half of the population of Oliver Paipoonge lives within five kilometres of Highway 11/17. Highway 102 runs through the northeast corner of the municipality.

A small grass airstrip is located northeast of Kakabeka Falls, and two rail lines run through the municipality.

== Education ==
Oliver Paipoonge is served by the Lakehead District School Board. There are four schools located in Oliver Paipoonge, Crestview Public School in Murillo, Kakabeka Falls Public School in Kakabeka Falls, Valley Central Public School and Thunder Bay Christian School (JK - Grade 12). High schools students are bused to Thunder Bay. A daycare centre is located in Murillo.

== See also ==
- List of townships in Ontario
