= Gillies, Ontario =

Gillies
- Township (single-tier)
- Township of Gillies
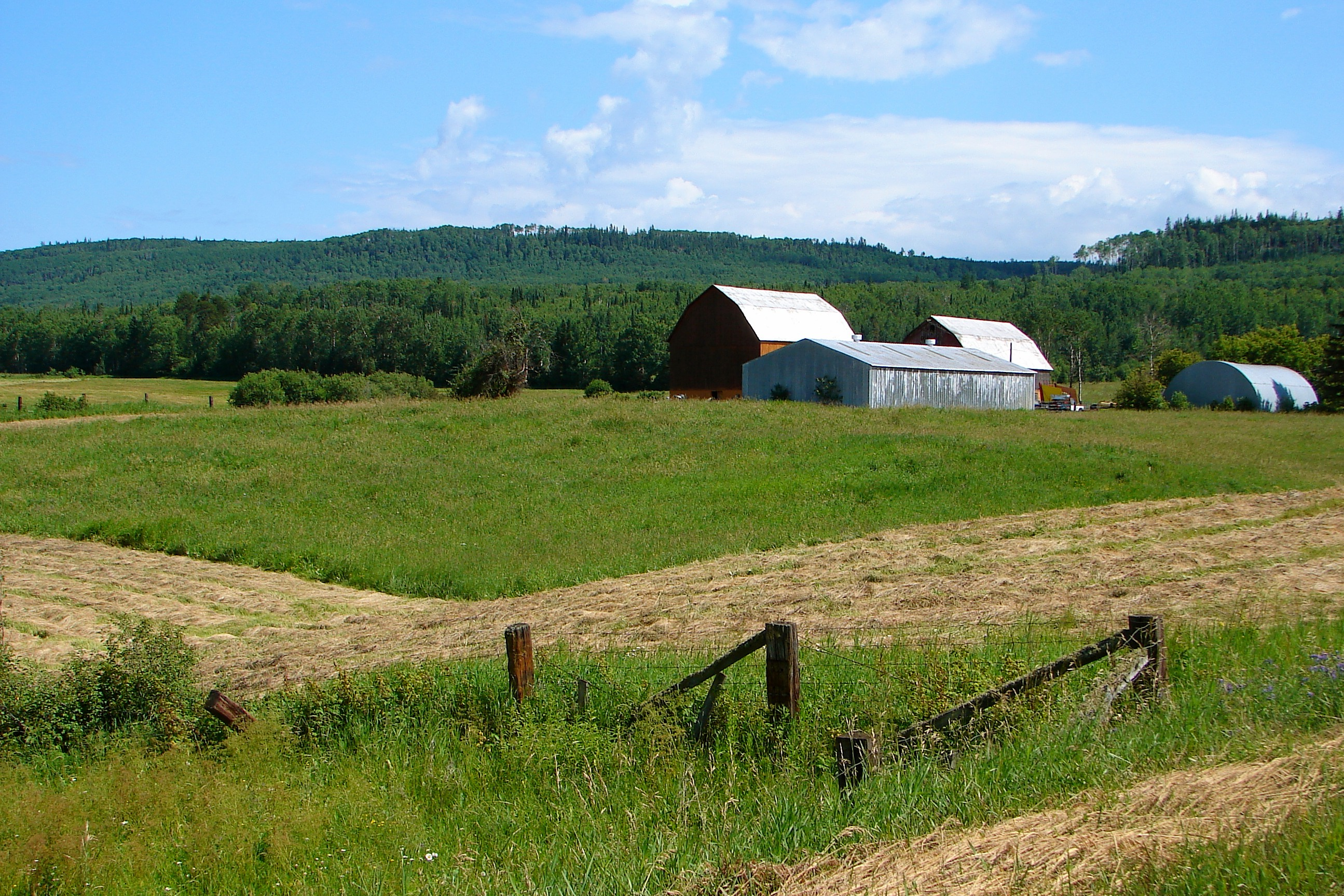

- Location within Ontario
- Coordinates: 48°16′N 89°42′W
- Country: Canada
- Province: Ontario
- District: Thunder Bay
- Settled: 1840s
- Incorporated: 1920

Government
  - Reeve: Wendy Wright
  - Fed. riding: Thunder Bay—Rainy River
  - Prov. riding: Thunder Bay—Atikokan

Area
  - Land: 92.68 km^{2} (35.78 sq mi)

Population (2021)
  - Total: 441
  - Density: 4.8/km^{2} (12/sq mi)
- Time zone: UTC-5 (EST)
  - Summer (DST): UTC-4 (EDT)
- Postal Code: P0T
- Area code: 807
- Website: www.gilliestownship.com

Gillies is a township in the Canadian province of Ontario, located within the Thunder Bay District.

The township is part of the city of Thunder Bay's Census Metropolitan Area, and includes the communities of Hymers (48°18′27″N 89°42′24″W), Sellars (48°17′27″N 89°44′41″W), and South Gillies (48°14′23″N 89°42′02″W).

== Demographics ==
In the 2021 Census of Population conducted by Statistics Canada, Gillies had a population of 441 living in 186 of its 208 total private dwellings, a change of −7% from its 2016 population of 474. With a land area of 92.68 km^{2} (35.78 sq mi), it had a population density of 4.8/km^{2} (12.3/sq mi) in 2021.

Canada census – Gillies community profile

	2021	2016	2011
Population	441 (-7.0% from 2016)	474 (+0.2% from 2011)	473 (-13.1% from 2006)
Land area	92.68 km^{2} (35.78 sq mi)	93.05 km^{2} (35.93 sq mi)	93.02 km^{2} (35.92 sq mi)
Population density	4.8/km^{2} (12/sq mi)	5.1/km^{2} (13/sq mi)	5.1/km^{2} (13/sq mi)
Median age	50.0 (M: 49.2, F: 50.8)	46.2 (M: 46.0, F: 46.7)
Private dwellings	208 (total) 186 (occupied)	201 (total)	209 (total)
Median household income	$90,000	$66,944

References: 2021 2016 2011

Historical census populations – Gillies, Ontario

Year	Pop.	±%
1901	279	—
1911	395	+41.6%
1921	422	+6.8%
1931	412	−2.4%
1941	474	+15.0%
1951	379	−20.0%
1956	429	+13.2%

Year	Pop.	±%
1961	425	−0.9%
1966	342	−19.5%
1971	333	−2.6%
1976	394	+18.3%
1981	461	+17.0%
1986	496	+7.6%
1991	498	+0.4%

Year	Pop.	±%
1996	497	−0.2%
2001	522	+5.0%
2006	544	+4.2%
2011	473	−13.1%
2016	474	+0.2%
2021	441	−7.0%

Source: Statistics Canada

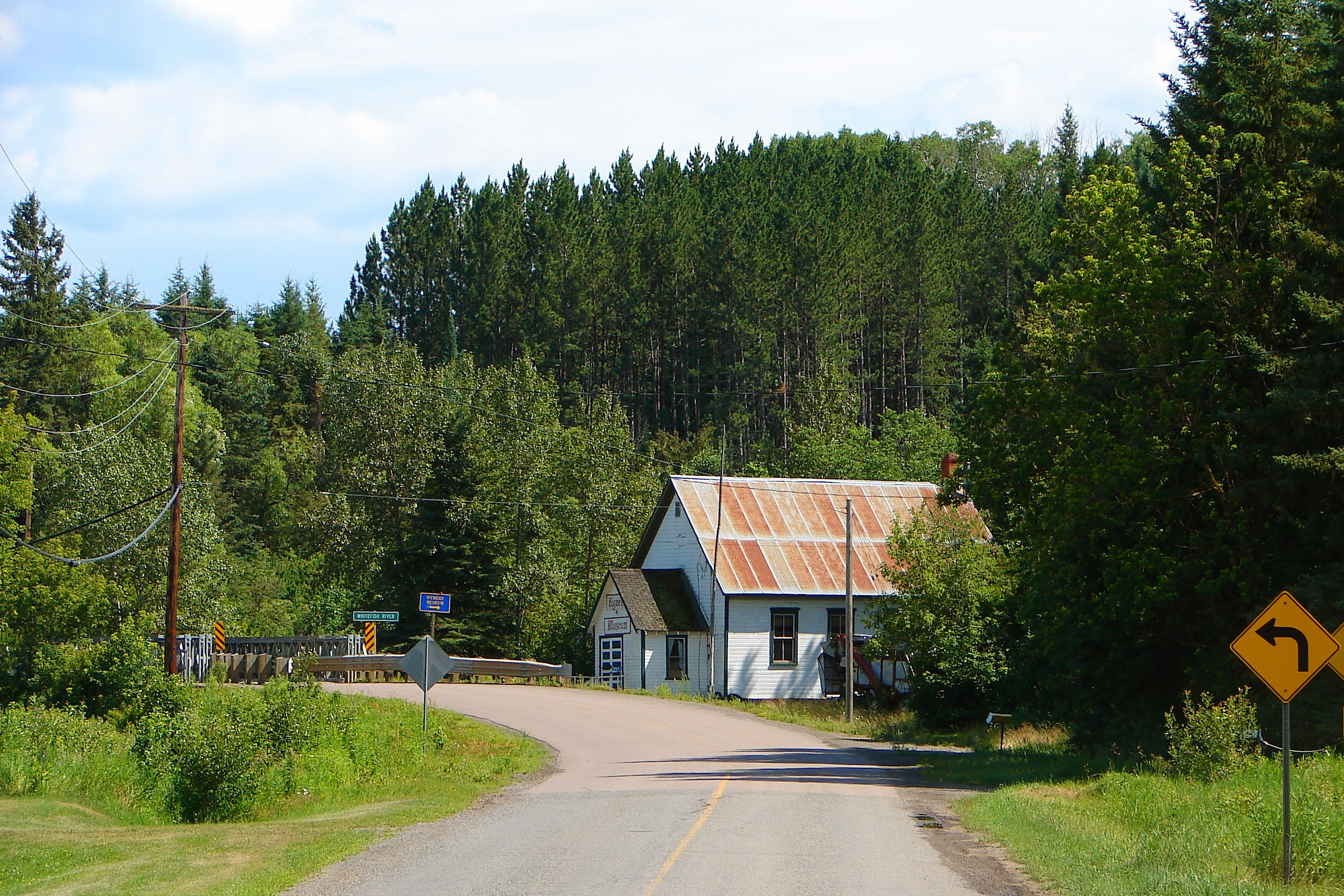
Hymers

== See also ==
- List of townships in Ontario
