= Gibson Lake =

Gibson Lake or Lake Gibson may refer to:

Canada

- Ontario
  - Algoma District
    - Gibson Lake (Aux Sables River)
    - Gibson Lake (Baldhead River), in Lake Superior Provincial Park
    - Gibson Lake (Pukaskwa River), in Pukaskwa River Provincial Park, shared with Thunder Bay District
  - Gibson Lake (Cochrane District)
  - Gibson Lake (Frontenac County)
  - Gibson Lake (Muskoka), in Muskoka Region
  - Lake Gibson (Ontario), in Niagara Region
  - Gibson Lake (Nipissing District)
  - Gibson Lake (Peel Region)
  - Gibson Lake (Renfrew County)
  - Gibson Lake (Sudbury District)
  - Gibson Lake (Thunder Bay District)

United States

- Gibson Lake (Indiana)
- Lake Gibson (Florida)

== See also ==
- Big Gibson Lake, in eastern Ontario, Canada
- Little Gibson Lake, in northeastern Ontario, Canada
