= List of lakes of Ontario: G =

This is a list of lakes of Ontario beginning with the letter G.

== Gaa–Gal ==
- Gaal Lake
- Gaba Lake
- Gabbro Lake (Kenora District)
- Gabbro Lake (Thunder Bay District)
- Gabel Lake
- Gabodin Lake
- Gabourel Lake
- Gaby Lake
- Gaddess Lake
- Gadsby Lake
- Gadwall Lake
- Gaetano Lake
- Gaf Lake
- Gaff Lake
- Gaffhook Lake
- Gaffney Lake (St. John Township, Cochrane District)
- Gaffney Lake (Hastings County)
- Gaffney Lake (Allan Lake, Cochrane District)
- Gage Lake
- Gagegenha Lake
- Gagne Lake (Kenora District)
- Gagne Lake (Sudbury District)
- Gagne Lake (Rainy River District)
- Gagnon Lake (Muskoka District)
- Gagnon Lake (Timiskaming District)
- Gagnon Lake (Sudbury District)
- Gagnon Lake (Algoma District)
- Gagnon Lakes (Cochrane District)
- Gagon Lake
- Gahn Lake
- Gail Lake (Haentschel Township, Sudbury District)
- Gail Lake (Killarney)
- Gailhowie Pond
- Gainey Lake
- Gaitche Lake
- Galbraith Lake (Muskoka District)
- Galbraith Lake (Rainy River District)
- Galbraith Lake (Kenora District)
- Gale Lake (Timiskaming District)
- Gale Lake (McMeekin Township, Kenora District)
- Gale Lake (Haliburton County)
- Gale Lake (Gail Creek, Kenora District)
- Gale Lake (Sudbury District)
- Galeairy Lake
- Galer Lake
- Galilee Lake
- Gall Lake (Kenora District)
- Gall Lake (Thunder Bay District)
- Galla Lake (Muskoka District)
- Galla Lake (Sudbury District)
- Gallagher Lake (Lanark County)
- Gallagher Lake (Sudbury District)
- Gallander Lake
- Gallinule Lake
- Gallivan Lake
- Gallo Lake
- Galloway Lake (Thunder Bay District)
- Galloway Lake (Peterborough County)
- Galloway Lake (Algoma District)
- Galloway Lake (Cochrane District)
- Galoche Lake
- Galore Lake

== Gam–Gap ==
- Gamagowong Lake
- Gamble Lake (Kenora District)
- Gamble Lake (Timiskaming District)
- Gamblemater Lake
- Game Lake (Kenora District)
- Game Lake (Cochrane District)
- Gami Lake
- Gamitagama Lake
- Gamma Lake (Sudbury District)
- Gamma Lake (Algoma District)
- Gammon Lake
- Gamp Lake
- Gamsby Lake
- Gananoque Lake
- Gander Lake
- Gandet Lake
- Gandier Lake
- Gap Lake
- Gapp Lake

== Gar–Gay ==
- Gar Lake
- Garbe Lake
- Garbo Lake
- Garden Lake (Horton)
- Garden Lake (Algoma District)
- Garden Lake (Brudenell, Lyndoch and Raglan)
- Garden Lake (Thunder Bay District)
- Gardiner Lake (Cochrane District)
- Gardiner Lake (Renfrew County)
- Gardiner Lake (Muskoka District)
- Gardnar Lake
- Gardner Lake (Thunder Bay District)
- Gardner Lake (Timiskaming District)
- Gareau Lake
- Garfinkle Hole
- Gargantua Lake
- Gargoyle Lake
- Garia Lake
- Garlough Lake
- Garneau Lake (Kenora District)
- Garneau Lake (Cochrane District)
- Garner Lake (Lennox and Addington County)
- Garner Lake (Kenora District)
- Garnet Lake (Algoma District)
- Garnet Lake (Thunder Bay District)
- Garnet Lake (Sudbury District)
- Garnham Lake
- Garraway Lake
- Garreau Lake
- Garrett Lake (Rainy River District)
- Garrett Lake (Kenora District)
- Garrick Lake
- Garrioch Lake
- Garrison Lake
- Garrow Lake
- Loch Garry
- Garskeys Lake
- Garson Lake
- Gart Lake
- Garter Lake (Bedford Township, South Frontenac)
- Garter Lake (Pittsburgh Township, South Frontenac)
- Garvey Lake (Kenora District)
- Garvey Lake (Sudbury District)
- Garvin Lake
- Gary Lake (Sudbury District)
- Gary Lake (Kenora District)
- Gash Lake
- Gashen Lake
- Gaskell's Lake
- Gastmeier Lake
- Gat Lake
- Gates Lake
- Gathering Lake
- Gaug Lake
- Gaugino Lake
- Gault Lake
- Gauntlet Lake
- Lac Gauthier
- Gauvreau Lake
- Gavigan Lake
- Gavin Lake
- Gavor Lake
- Gawasi Lake
- Gawjewiagwa Lake
- Gay Lake (Algoma District)
- Gay Lake (Thunder Bay District)
- Gay Lake (Sudbury District)
- Gayo Lake

== Ged–Gen ==
- Geddes Lake
- Gee Lake (Lang Township, Sudbury District)
- Gee Lake (Penhorwood Township, Sudbury District)
- Geejay Lake
- Gegear Lake
- Gehl Lake
- Geiger Lake
- Geikie Lake
- Geikie Lakes
- Gelapa Lake
- Gelinas Lake
- Gelley Lake
- Gem Lake (Timiskaming District)
- Gem Lake (Sudbury District)
- Gem Lake (Nipissing District)
- Gem Lake (Haliburton County)
- Gemini Lake
- Genack Lake
- Gene Lake
- Generator Lake
- Genesee Lake
- Genessee Lake
- Geneva Lake
- Genier Lake
- Gennis Lake
- Genoa Lake
- Genricks Lake
- Gentian Lake

== Geo ==
- Geoffrey Lake
- Geoffrion Lake
- Geometry Lake
- Geordie Lake
- Geordies Lake
- Lake George
- George Lake (Bruce County)
- George Lake (Timiskaming District)
- George Lake (Manitoulin District)
- George Lake (Cochrane District)
- George Lake (Regan Township, Sudbury District)
- George Lake (Algoma District)
- George Lake (Rossie Lake, Kenora District)
- George Lake (Thunder Bay District)
- George Lake (Tustin Township, Kenora District)
- George Lake (Nipissing District)
- George Lake (Umbach Township, Kenora District)
- George Lake (Sioux Lookout)
- George Lake (Chester Township, Sudbury District)
- George Lake (Sables-Spanish Rivers)
- Lac Georges
- George's Lake
- Georgia Lake (Thunder Bay District)
- Georgia Lake (Frontenac County)
- Georgia Lake (Sudbury District)
- Georgina Lake
- Georgina Lake

== Ger–Ges ==
- Gerald Lake (Nipissing District)
- Gerald Lake (Kenora District)
- Geraldine Lake
- Gerber Lake
- German Lake
- Gerow Lake (Thunder Bay District)
- Gerow Lake (Parry Sound District)
- Gerrard Lake (Kenora District)
- Gerrard Lake (Algoma District)
- Gerry Lake (Snakeweed Lake, Kenora District)
- Gerry Lake (Cochrane District)
- Gerry Lake (English River, Kenora District)
- Gerry Lake (Timiskaming District)
- Gertrude Lake (Sudbury District)
- Gertrude Lake (Cochrane District)
- Gervais Lake
- Gervis Lake
- Gessie Lake

== Gh ==
- Ghee Lake
- Ghost Lake (Pearce Township, Cochrane District)
- Ghost Lake (Elliott Township, Cochrane District)
- Ghost Lake (Brownridge Township, Kenora District)
- Ghost Lake (Turtle River, Kenora District)
- Ghost Lake (Frog River, Kenora District)
- Ghost Lake (St. Raphael River, Kenora District)
- Ghost Lake (Algoma District)
- Ghost Lake (Nipissing District)
- Ghoul Lake

== Gia–Gil ==
- Giacomo Lake
- Gib Lake
- Gibb Lake
- Gibberry Lake
- Gibboney Lake
- Gibbons Lake
- Gibi Lake
- Gibraltar Lake
- Lake Gibson
- Gibson Lake (Thunder Bay District)
- Gibson Lake (Monestime Township, Algoma District)
- Gibson Lake (Nipissing District)
- Gibson Lake (Greater Sudbury)
- Gibson Lake (Muskoka District)
- Gibson Lake (Cochrane District)
- Gibson Lake (Renfrew County)
- Gibson Lake (Peel Region)
- Gibson Lake (Charbonneau Township, Algoma District)
- Gibson Lake (Brimacombe Township, Algoma District)
- Gibson Lake (Frontenac County)
- Gibsons Lake (Renfrew County)
- Gibsons Lake (Frontenac County)
- Giffins Lake
- Gifford Lake
- Gignac Lake (Kenora District)
- Gignac Lake (Simcoe County)
- Giguere Lake
- Gilbank Lake
- Gilbert Lake
- Gilbert Lake (Nipissing District)
- Gilbert Lake (Gilbert Township, Sudbury District)
- Gilbert Lake (Rainy River District)
- Gilbert Lake (Marsh Township, Sudbury District)
- Gilboe Lake
- Gilby Lake
- Gilchrist Lake
- Gilden Lake
- Gilhuly Lake
- Gill Lake (Thunder Bay District)
- Gill Lake (Nipissing District)
- Gillard Lake
- Gilleach Lake
- Gilleran Lake
- Gillies Lake (Timiskaming District)
- Gillies Lake (Cochrane District)
- Gillies Lake (Grey County)
- Gillies Lake (Lanark County)
- Gillies Lake (Bruce County)
- Gillies Lake (Nipssing District)
- Gillies Lake (Timiskaming District)
- Gillin Lake
- Gillmor Lake
- Gillnet Lake
- Gilman Lake
- Gilmour Lake
- Gilroy Lake
- Gilson Lake (Attawapiskat River, Kenora District)
- Gilson Lake (Deception River, Kenora District)
- Gilt Lake

== Gim–Giv ==
- Gimby Lake
- Gimlet Lake
- Gin Lake
- Gina Lake
- Ginger Lake
- Ginn Lake
- Gipsy Lake (Sudbury District)
- Gipsy Lake (Nipissing District)
- Giraffe Lake
- Girard Lake (Kenora District)
- Girard Lake (Timiskaming District)
- Girardin Pond
- Giroux Lake (Parry Sound District)
- Giroux Lake (Timiskaming District)
- Girty Lake
- Girvan Lake
- Girvin Lake
- Gitche Lake
- Gittins Lake
- Giunta Lake
- Giving Lake

== Gl–Gn ==
- Glabb Lake
- Glacier Lake (Nipissing District)
- Glacier Lake (Thunder Bay District)
- Glacier Lake (Rainy River District)
- Glade Lake
- Gladstone Lake
- Gladwin Lake
- Gladys Lake (Timiskaming District)
- Gladys Lake (Kenora District)
- Glaister Lake
- Glamor Lake
- Glanmire Lake
- Glasford Lake
- Glasgow Lake
- Glasgow Pond
- Glass Lake
- Glasser Lake
- Glassy Lake (Nipissing District)
- Glassy Lake (Frontenac County)
- Glassy Lake (Algoma District)
- Glay Lake
- Glaze Lake
- Gleason Lake (Kenora District)
- Gleason Lake (Grey County)
- Gleave Lake
- Gledhill Lake
- Gleeson Lake
- Glen Huron Pond
- Glen Lake (Timiskaming District)
- Glen Lake (Priske Township, Thunder Bay District)
- Glen Lake (GTP Block 2 Township, Thunder Bay District)
- Glen Lake (Nipissing District)
- Glen Lake (Cochrane District)
- Glendalough Lake
- Glendening Lake
- Glenn Lake
- Glenney Lake
- Glider Lake
- Glimmer Lake
- Gling Lake
- Gliskning Lake
- Glitter Lake
- Globe Lake (Thunder Bay District)
- Globe Lake (Timiskaming District)
- Gloomy Lake
- Glorious Lake
- Glory Lake
- Gloucester Pool
- Glover Lake (Timiskaming District)
- Glover Lake (Kenora District)
- Glue Lake
- Glynn Lake
- Gnat Lake
- Gneiss Lake
- Gnome Lake

== Goa–Gol ==
- Goat Lake (Nipissing District)
- Goat Lake (Sudbury District)
- Goat Lake (Kenora District)
- Goat Lake (Algoma District)
- Goblin Lake
- God's Lake
- Godda Lake
- Goddard Lake (Thunder Bay District)
- Goddard Lake (Hastings County)
- Godden Lake
- Godfrey Lake
- Godin Lake (Algoma District)
- Godin Lake (Renfrew County)
- Godon Lake (Cochrane District)
- Godon Lake (Algoma District)
- Godson Lake
- Goethe Lake
- Goetz Lake
- Goff Lake
- Gog Lake (Thunder Bay District)
- Gog Lake (Sudbury District)
- Go Home Lake
- Going Lake
- Golborne Lakes
- Gold Lake (Sudbury District)
- Gold Lake (Rainy River District)
- Gold Lake (Cochrane District)
- Gold Lake (Peterborough County)
- Gold Lake (Timiskaming District)
- Gold Lake (Thunder Bay District)
- Gold Lake (Kenora District)
- Gold Mountain Lake
- Goldbar Lake
- Golden City Lake
- Golden Gate Lake
- Golden Lake (Renfrew County)
- Golden Lake (Timiskaming District)
- Goldeneye Lake
- Goldfield Lake
- Goldfish Lake
- Goldie Lake (Sudbury District)
- Goldie Lake (Dambrossio Township, Algoma District)
- Goldie Lake (Frost Township, Algoma District)
- Goldie Lake (Timiskaming District)
- Goldilocks Lake
- Golding Lake
- Goldsborough Lake
- Goldsmith Lake
- Goldspink Lake
- Goldstein Lake
- Goldthorpe Lake
- Goldwin Lake
- Golf Lake
- Golka Lake
- Goltz Lake
- Golub Lake

== Gon–Goo ==
- Gong Lake
- Gonyea Lake
- Gooch Lake
- Good Fortune Lake
- Good Lake (Thunder Bay District)
- Good Lake (Parry Sound District)
- Good Lake (Kenora District)
- Good Site Lake
- Goodchild Lake
- Goode Lake
- Gooderham Lake (Haliburton County)
- Gooderham Lake (Nipissing District)
- Goodeve Lake
- Goodfish Lake (Kirkland Lake)
- Goodfish Lake (Dane Township, Timiskaming District)
- Goodie Lake
- Goodier Lake
- Goodlad Lake
- Goodliff Lake
- Goodman Lake (Vista Lake, Thunder Bay District)
- Goodman Lake (Muskoka District)
- Goodman Lake (Gorham Township, Thunder Bay District)
- Goodmorning Lakes
- Goodoar Lake
- Goodreau Lake
- Goods Lake (Kenora District)
- Goods Lake (Lennox and Addington County)
- Goodwill Lake
- Goodwin Lake (Haliburton County)
- Goodwin Lake (Timiskaming District)
- Goodwin Lake (Sudbury District)
- Gooley Lake
- Goosander Lake (Thunder Bay District)
- Goosander Lake (Nipissing District)
- Goose Egg Lake (Timiskaming District)
- Goose Egg Lake (Kenora District)
- Goose Egg Lake (Parry Sound District)
- Goose Lake (Berens River, Kenora District)
- Goose Lake (Somerville Township, Kawartha Lakes)
- Goose Lake (Ogoki Reservoir, Thunder Bay District)
- Goose Lake (Priske Township, Thunder Bay District)
- Goose Lake (Ear Falls)
- Goose Lake (Renfrew County)
- Goose Lake (St. Anne Island, Lambton County)
- Goose Lake (Sudbury District)
- Goose Lake (Parry Sound District)
- Goose Lake (Pottowatamie Island, Lambton County)
- Goose Lake (Cochrane District)
- Goose Lake (Lennox and Addington County)
- Goose Lake (English River, Kenora District)
- Goose Lake (Mariposa Township, Kawartha Lakes)
- Goose Pond
- Gooseberry Lake
- Gooseneck Lake (Thunder Bay District)
- Gooseneck Lake (Parry Sound District)
- Gooseneck Lake (Horseshoe Lake, Kenora District)
- Gooseneck Lake (Timiskaming District)
- Gooseneck Lake (Sword Creek, Kenora District)

== Gor–Gow ==
- Gord Lake
- Loch Gordon
- Gordon Lake (Bruce County)
- Gordon Lake (Sudbury District)
- Gordon Lake (Werner Lake, Kenora District)
- Gordon Lake (Greater Sudbury)
- Gordon Lake (The Archipelago)
- Gordon Lake (Bridges Township, Kenora District)
- Gordon Lake (Plummer Additional)
- Gordon Lake (Cochrane District)
- Gordon Lake (Haliburton County)
- Gordon Lake (Timiskaming District)
- Gordon Lake (Duncan Township, Algoma District)
- Gordon Lake (Thunder Bay District)
- Gordon Lake (Whitestone)
- Gordon Lake (Fourstar Lake, Kenora District)
- Gordon Reid Lake
- Gorge Lake
- Gorman Lake (Renfrew County)
- Gorman Lake (Timiskaming District)
- Gormire Lake
- Gornupkagama Lake
- Gorr Lakes
- Gorrie Lake
- Gorse Lake
- Gort Lake (Pikitigushi River, Thunder Bay District)
- Gort Lake (Gort Creek, Thunder Bay District)
- Goschen Lake
- Goshawk Lake
- Goshen Lake
- Gosling Lake (Thunder Bay District)
- Gosling Lake (Muskoka District)
- Gosney Lake
- Goss Lake (Frond Lake, Kenora District)
- Goss Lake (Rolston Lake, Kenora District)
- Gosselin Lake (Sudbury District)
- Gosselin Lake (Nipissing District)
- Gosselin Lake (Cochrane District)
- Goudreau Lake (Algoma District)
- Goudreau Lake (Cochrane District)
- Goudy Lake
- Gouin Lake
- Gouinlock Lake
- Goulais Lake (Hastings County)
- Goulais Lake (Algoma District)
- Gould Lake (Bruce County)
- Gould Lake (Kenora District)
- Gould Lake (Algoma District)
- Gould Lake (Frontenac County)
- Gould Lake (Parry Sound District)
- Gould Lake (Lee Township, Timiskaming District)
- Gould Lake (Van Hise Township, Timiskaming District)
- Gould Lake (Hastings County)
- Goulding Lake
- Goulet Lake
- Gourd Lake (Kenora District)
- Gourd Lake (Algoma District)
- Gourlay Lake (Sudbury District)
- Gourlay Lake (Algoma District)
- Gourlay Lake (Cochrane District)
- Govan Lake
- Gove Lake
- Gover Lake
- Government Lake
- Gowagamak Lake
- Gowan Lake (Cochrane District)
- Gowan Lake (Thunder Bay District)
- Gowan Lake (Grey County)
- Gowanmarsh Lake
- Goward Lake
- Gowganda Lake

== Gr ==
- Grab Lake
- Grabers Lake
- Grace Lake (Cochrane District)
- Grace Lake (Thunder Bay District)
- Grace Lake (Sudbury District)
- Grace Lake (Larder Lake)
- Grace Lake (Haliburton County)
- Grace Lake (Lundy Township, Timiskaming District)
- Grace Lake (Hastings County)
- Grace Lake (Kenora District)
- Graceful Lake
- Gracie Lake (Algoma District)
- Gracie Lake (Kenora District)
- Grade Lake
- Grady Lake (Leeds and Grensville United Counties)
- Grady Lake (Kenora District)
- Graff Lake
- Graft Lake
- Graham Lake (Lennox and Addington County)
- Graham Lake (Frontenac County)
- Graham Lake (GTP Block 5 Township, Thunder Bay District)
- Graham Lake (Nipissing District)
- Graham Lake (Leeds and Grenville United Counties)
- Graham Lake (Duckworth Township, Thunder Bay District)
- Graham Lake (Sudbury District)
- Graham Lake (Renfrew County)
- Graham Lake (Usnac Township, Algoma District)
- Graham Lake (Lanark County)
- Graham Lake (Kenora District)
- Graham Lake (Gaudry Township, Algoma District)
- Graham Lake (Timiskaming District)
- Graham Lake (Rainy River District)
- Graham's Lake
- Granary Lake
- Grand Lake (Timiskaming District)
- Grand Lake (Nipissing District)
- Grande Lake
- Grandeur Lake
- Grandma Lake
- Grandma Stevens Pond
- Grandmaison Lake
- Grandpa Lake
- Grandpop's Lake
- Grandview Lake
- Granite Lake (Granite River, Thunder Bay District)
- Granite Lake (Kenora District)
- Granite Lake (The Archipelago)
- Granite Lake (Frontenac County)
- Granite Lake (Dorion)
- Granite Lake (Rainy River District)
- Granite Lake (Nipissing District)
- Granite Lake (Sudbury District)
- Granite Lake (Allan Water, Thunder Bay District)
- Granite Lake (Whitestone)
- Graniteboss Lake
- Granitehill Lake
- Granitic Lake
- Granka Lake
- Grano Lake
- Grant Lake (Renfrew County)
- Grant Lake (Rainy River District)
- Grant Lake (Nipissing District)
- Grant Lake (Fiddler Township, Algoma District)
- Grant Lake (Cochrane District)
- Grant Lake (Thunder Bay District)
- Grant Lake (McMahon Township, Algoma District)
- Grant Lake (Lower Manitou Lake, Kenora District)
- Grant Lake (Muskoka District)
- Grant Lake (Sudbury District)
- Grant Lake (Werner River, Kenora District)
- Grants Lake (Renfrew County)
- Grants Lake (Lennox and Addington County)
- Granzies Lake
- Grape Lake
- Graphic Lake
- Graphite Lake (Nipissing District)
- Graphite Lake (Hastings County)
- Grapnel Lake
- Grasett Lake
- Grass Hill Lake
- Grass Lake (Sudbury District)
- Grass Lake (McNevin Township, Kenora District)
- Grass Lake (Lac Seul, Kenora District)
- Grass Lake (Waterloo Region)
- Grass Lake (Simcoe County)
- Grass Lake (Mafeking Township, Kenora District)
- Grass Lake (Nipissing District)
- Grass Lake (Haliburton County)
- Grass Lake (Parry Sound District)
- Grass Lake (Cochrane District)
- Grass-pink Lake
- Grasser Lake
- Grassy Lake (Peterborough County)
- Grassy Lake (McElroy Township, Timiskaming District)
- Grassy Lake (Barr Township, Timiskaming District)
- Grassy Lake (Jarvis Township, Algoma District)
- Grassy Lake (Serpent River 7)
- Grassy Lake (Lessard Township, Algoma District)
- Grassy Lake (Swartman Township, Cochrane District)
- Grassy Lake (Black River-Matheson)
- Grassy Lake (Renfrew County)
- Grassy Lake (Sibley Township, Thunder Bay District)
- Grassy Lake (Shuniah)
- Grassy Lake (Tuuri Township, Thunder Bay District)
- Grassy Lake (Relief Lake, Thunder Bay District)
- Grassy Lake (Hastings County)
- Grassy Lake (Kemp Township, Sudbury District)
- Grassy Lake (Norman Township, Greater Sudbury)
- Grassy Lake (Carty Township, Sudbury District)
- Grassy Lake (Louise Township, Greater Sudbury)
- Grassy Lake (Rainy River District)
- Grassy Lake (Kenora District)
- Grassy Narrows Lake (Thunder Bay District)
- Grassy Narrows Lake (Kenora District)
- Gratton Lake
- Grave Lake (Shelley Township, Sudbury District)
- Grave Lake (Kenora District)
- Grave Lake (Grigg Township, Sudbury District)
- Gravel Beach Lake
- Gravel Lake (Allouez Township, Algoma District)
- Gravel Lake (Thunder Bay District)
- Gravel Lake (Sudbury District)
- Gravel Lake (Pine Township, Algoma District)
- Gravel Lake (Frontenac County)
- Gravel Lakes
- Gravel Pit Pond
- Gravelpit Lake
- Gravelridge Lake
- Gravenor Lake
- Graves Lake
- Graveyard Lake (Algoma District)
- Graveyard Lake (Beaumont Township, Sudbury District)
- Graveyard Lake (Kenora District)
- Graveyard Lake (Engstrom Township, Sudbury District)
- Gravy Lake
- Grawbarger Lake
- Gray Lake (Rainy River District)
- Gray Lake (Kenora District)
- Gray Lake (Muskoka District)
- Gray Lake (Thunder Bay District)
- Graydarl Lake
- Graydon Lake
- Grayling Lake
- Graymud Lake
- Grays Lake
- Grayson Lake
- Graystone Lake
- Grazing Lake
- Great Lake
- Great Mountain Lake
- Great Pike Lake
- Great Portage Lake
- Greb Lake
- Grebe Lake (Algoma District)
- Grebe Lake (Thunder Bay District)
- Grebe Lake (Cochrane District)
- Green Bug Lake
- Green Island Lake
- Green Lake (Timmins)
- Green Lake (Colquhoun Township, Cochrane District)
- Green Lake (Peel Region)
- Green Lake (Piskegomang Brook, Kenora District)
- Green Lake (Kenny Lake, Kenora District)
- Green Lake (Haliburton County)
- Green Lake (Lanark County)
- Green Lake (Hess Township, Sudbury District)
- Green Lake (Penhorwood Township, Sudbury District)
- Green Lake (Cascaden Township, Sudbury District)
- Green Lake (Foleyet Township, Sudbury District)
- Green Lake (Windigoostigwan Lake, Thunder Bay District)
- Green Lake (Kenogamisis River, Thunder Bay District)
- Green Lake (Manitoulin District)
- Green Lake (Elliot Lake)
- Green Lake (Otter Township, Algoma District)
- Green Lake (Dubreuilville)
- Green Lake (Rainy River District)
- Green Lake (Madawaska Valley)
- Green Lake (Greater Madawaska)
- Green Lake (Burdenell, Lyndoch and Raglan)
- Green Lake (North Algona Wilberforce)
- Green Lake (Lauder Township, Nipissing District)
- Green Lake (Olrig Township, Nipissing District)
- Green Lake (Parkman Township, Nipissing District)
- Green Lake (Leeds and Grenville United Counties)
- Green Lake (Timiskaming District)
- Green Lake (North Frontenac)
- Green Lake (South Frontenac)
- Green Lakes
- Green Tree Lake
- Green-winged Teal Lake
- Greenbark Lake
- Greenbough Lake
- Greenbush Lake
- Greengrass Lake
- Greenheart Lake
- Greenhedge Lake
- Greenhill Lake
- Greenhue Lake
- Greening Lake
- Greenish Lake
- Greenland Lake
- Greenlaw Lake
- Greenleaf Lake
- Greenlee Lake
- Greenmantle Lake
- Greenock Lake
- Greenpike Lake
- Greenrod Lake
- Greens Lake (Sudbury District)
- Greens Lake (Peterborough County)
- Greenshields Lake
- Greenshore Lake
- Greensides Lake
- Greenwater Lake (Van Nostrand Township, Timiskaming District)
- Greenwater Lake (Twomey Lake, Thunder Bay District)
- Greenwater Lake (Begin Township, Thunder Bay District)
- Greenwater Lake (Styx Creek, Thunder Bay District)
- Greenwater Lake (Hincks Township, Timiskaming District)
- Greenwater Lake (Kenora District)
- Greenwich Lake
- Greenwood Lake (Haliburton County)
- Greenwood Lake (Algoma District)
- Greenwood Lake (Nipissing District)
- Greenwood Lake (Thunder Bay District)
- Greer Lake (Algoma District)
- Greer Lake (Greer Creek, Thunder Bay District)
- Greer Lake (Falls River, Rainy River District)
- Greer Lake (Kett Creek, Rainy River District)
- Greer Lake (Parry Sound District)
- Greer Lake (Stirling Township, Thunder Bay District)
- Greggio Lake
- Greggs Lake
- Gregory Lake (Algoma District)
- Gregory Lake (Haliburton County)
- Grehan Lake
- Greig Lake
- Gremm Lake
- Grenadier Lake
- Grenadier Pond
- Grenfell Lake
- Grenier Lake
- Grenville Lake
- Greske Lake
- Greta Lake
- Gretchel Lake
- Gretel Lake
- Grew Lake (Thunder Bay District)
- Grew Lake (Sudbury District)
- Grey Duck Lake
- Grey Lake (Atikokan)
- Grey Lake (Cochrane District)
- Grey Lake (Sudbury District)
- Grey Lake (Dell Lake, Rainy River District)
- Grey Lake (Timiskaming District)
- Grey Owl Lake (Algoma District)
- Grey Owl Lake (Nipissing District)
- Grey Owl Lake (Parry Sound District)
- Grey Trout Lake (Kenora District)
- Grey Trout Lake (Algoma District)
- Greylava Lake
- Greyowl Lake
- Grid Lake
- Gridiron Lake
- Griff Lake
- Griffen Lake
- Griffey Lake
- Griffin Lake (Cochrane District)
- Griffin Lake (Algoma District)
- Grigg Lake
- Grim Lake
- Grimard Lake
- Grimm Lake
- Grimmon Lake
- Grimshaw Lake
- Grimsthorpe Lake
- Grin Lake
- Grindstone Lake (Kenora District)
- Grindstone Lake (Frontenac County)
- Grindstone Lake (Muskoka District)
- Grindstone Lake (Algoma District)
- Grip Lake
- Gripp Lake
- Grippen Lake
- Grist Lake
- Grit Lake
- Grizzly Lake
- Groom Lake (Parry Sound District)
- Groom Lake (Sudbury District)
- Groom Lake (Timiskaming District)
- Groove Lake
- Gros lac Martin
- Grosbeak Lake (Sudbury District)
- Grosbeak Lake (Cochrane District)
- Grosbeak Lake (Nipissing District)
- Gross Lake
- Ground Lake
- Ground Lizard Lake
- Groundhog Lake (Sudbury District)
- Groundhog Lake (Nipissing District)
- Grouse Lake (Thunder Bay District)
- Grouse Lake (Parry Sound District)
- Grouse Lake (Muskoka District)
- Grouse Lake (Algoma District)
- Grove Lake (Nipissing District)
- Grove Lake (Cochrane District)
- Grove Lake (Kenora District)
- Grover Lake
- Groves Lake (Sudbury District)
- Groves Lake (Muskoka District)
- Grow Lake
- Grub Lake
- Grundoon Lake
- Grundy Lake
- Grup Lake
- Gruschwitz Pond
- Gryphon Lake

== Gu ==
- Guay Lake
- Guda Lake
- Guelph Lake
- Guenette Lake
- Guerin Lake
- Guerley Lake
- Guernsey Lake
- Guest Lake
- Guibord Lake
- Guide Lake (Kenora District)
- Guide Lake (Nipissing District)
- Guilford Lake
- Guilfoyle Lake
- Guilmette Lake
- Guiney Lake (Brudenell, Lyndoch and Raglan)
- Guiney Lake (Greater Madawaska)
- Guise Lake
- Guitar Lake
- Gulch Lake
- Gull Lake (Sudbury District)
- Gull Lake (Temagami)
- Gull Lake (Cochrane District)
- Gull Lake (Timiskaming District)
- Gull Lake (Butcher Township, Algoma District)
- Gull Lake (Hawkins Township, Algoma District)
- Gull Lake (Parry Sound District)
- Gull Lake (Muskoka District)
- Gull Lake (Kenora District)
- Gull Lake (Haliburton County)
- Gull Lake (Lister Township, Nipissing District)
- Gull Lake (Lennox and Addington County)
- Gull Lakes (Sudbury District)
- Gull Lakes (Thunder Bay District)
- Gull Rock Lake
- Gullbeak Lake
- Gullfeather Lake
- Gulliver Lake (Thunder Bay District)
- Gulliver Lake (Kenora District)
- Gulliver's Lake
- Gullrock Lake (Kenora District)
- Gullrock Lake (Timiskaming District)
- Gullwing Lake (Kenora District)
- Gullwing Lake (Muskoka District)
- Gullystone Lake
- Gum Lake (Nipissing District)
- Gum Lake (Algoma District)
- Gum Lake (Thunder Bay District)
- Gumboot Lake
- Gummer Lake
- Gump Lake
- Gumuly Lake
- Gun Lake (Nipissing District)
- Gun Lake (Haliburton County)
- Gun Lake (Renfrew County)
- Gun Lake (Kenora District)
- Gunderson Lake
- Gundy Lake
- Gunflint Lake
- Gunnar Lake
- Gunning Lake
- Gunns Lake
- Gunter Lake (Cashel Township, Hastings County)
- Gunter Lake (Tudor Township, Hastings County)
- Gunter Lake (Thunder Bay District)
- Gunther Lake
- Guppy Lake
- Gurd Lake
- Gurden Lake
- Gurica Lake
- Gurnett Lake
- Gurney Lake (Thunder Bay District)
- Gurney Lake (Cochrane District)
- Gurr Lake
- Gus Lake (Thunder Bay District)
- Gus Lake (Kenora District)
- Guskewau Lake
- Gussie Lake
- Gustauson Lake
- Gusty Lake
- Gut Lake (Timiskaming District)
- Gut Lake (Algoma District)
- Gut Lake (Parry Sound District)
- Gutcher Lake
- Guthrie Lake
- Gutteridge Lake
- Guy Lake (Kenora District)
- Guy Lake (Thunder Bay District)
- Guyatt Lake

== Gw–Gz ==
- Gwatkin Lake
- Gwen Lake
- Gwilliams Lake
- Gwylan Lake
- Gwyn Lake
- Gwynfa Lake
- Gypsy Lake
- Gzowski Lake
