= Impact of the COVID-19 pandemic on long-term care facilities =

Aspect of viral outbreak

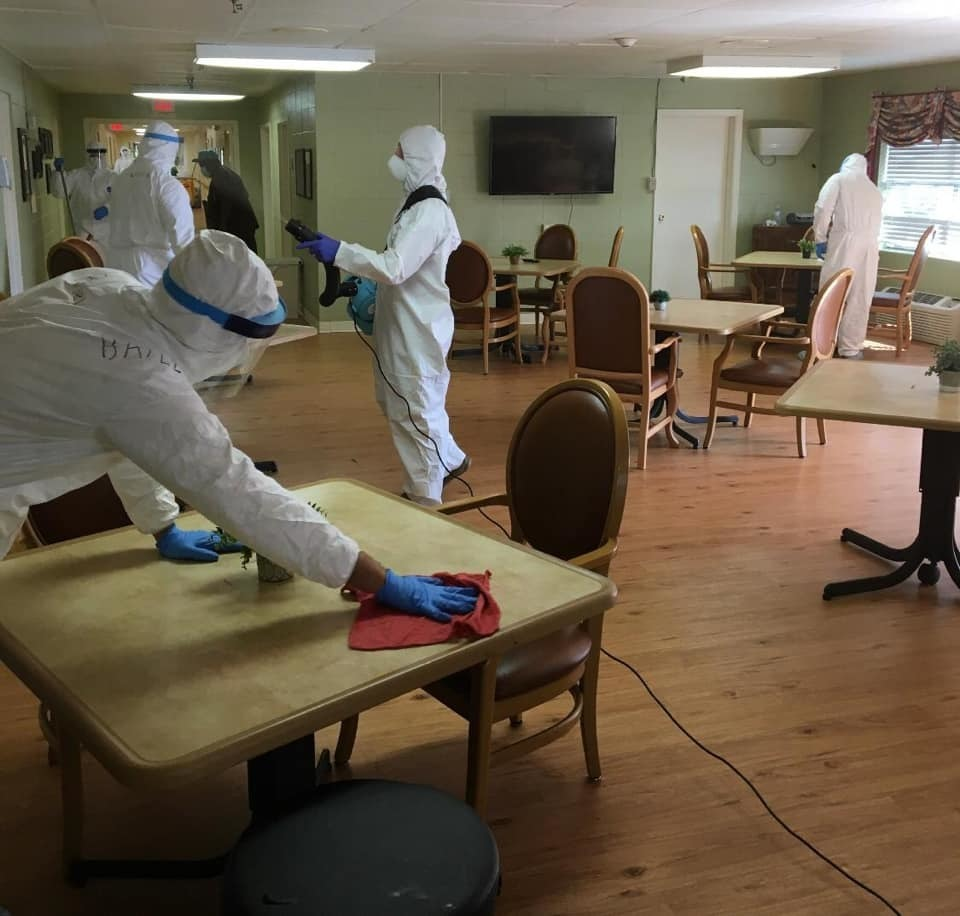
Georgia National Guard disinfects common areas of a nursing home

The COVID-19 pandemic has impacted long-term care facilities and nursing homes around the world. Thousands of residents of these facilities, who are a high-risk group, have died of the disease.

== Hazard controls ==
The U.S. Centers for Disease Control and Prevention has issued guidance on prevention and management strategies for COVID-19 in long-term care facilities. Prevention strategies include educating residents and staff on COVID-19, symptom screening, visitor restrictions, wearing face coverings, and installing sanitizer stations. Face masks should not be worn by those who have difficulty breathing. At least one staff member with training in infection prevention and control can serve as on-site management. Space should be set aside to isolate and care for confirmed cases of COVID-19. Staff members need flexible sick policies and should be encouraged to self-monitor for symptoms.

== Canada ==
As of July 2020, there were 9000 COVID-19 deaths in Canadian long-term care homes. Of those, more than 5600 were in Quebec, and nearly 2800 were in Ontario. British Columbia had less than 200 deaths in LTC facilities.

As of mid-April 2020, nearly half of the COVID-19 deaths in Canada were at long-term care facilities. Residences are provincially-regulated, meaning that standards are inconsistent on the worker to resident ratios and standards of training.

Outcomes have varied across a wide range from province to province, with Quebec experiencing an extremely large problem centered around the Island of Montreal (materially affecting national statistics). The populous province of Ontario also experienced a large problem, centered around Toronto.

The western province of British Columbia, with Canada's third-largest urban center, Vancouver, experienced one of the earliest cases in Canada involving long-term care: a health care worker at the Lynn Valley Care Centre in North Vancouver, announced on 5 March as the first known community transmission in BC. Two days later, the first death from a resident in long-term care was announced in connection with the same facility.

Aggressive measures were implemented on 18 March with the announcement of a $10 million per month government program to increase salaries for long-term care workers in support of a directive limiting care workers to work at a single facility only. As of 30 May, BC has reported 113 deaths involving residents and workers associated with long-term care, against a provincial population of 5 million. At this same date, Quebec—on a population of 8.5 million—has reported 3,694 death associated with long-term care: 2,786 deaths associated with government-managed facilities and another 908 deaths associated with private care.

In Quebec, a team of health care professionals inspecting Résidence Herron after a resident's death from COVID-19 found the facility largely abandoned by staff. Living conditions inside were similar to "a concentration camp", according to the officials.

In Ontario on 18 March, an outbreak began in the Pinecrest Nursing Home in Bobcaygeon, and as of 6 April, 29 of its 65 residents have died as a result of COVID-19. On 6 April, the City of Toronto discovered that a large shipment of Chinese-made masks delivered to its long-term care facilities were defective. On April 16, the province decided to halt transfers to long-term care homes. Assistance from the Canadian Armed Forces at five Toronto-area nursing homes, beginning in April, led to a report by the Brigadier General in charge documenting extreme conditions and abuse. The Ontario Ombudsman announced the launch an investigation into long-term care facilities on June 1.

A study published by the Canadian Medical Association Journal found that while outbreaks occurred equally in Ontario's for-profit and non-for-profit long-term care homes, negative outcomes were more prevalent in for-profit facilities. They found a 196% increase in cases, and a 178% increase in deaths. A rapid review of COVID-19 outcomes found a significant relationship in the unadjusted statistics between ownership status and effectiveness in response to the COVID-19 pandemic. This relationship was attenuated after looking at the adjusted figures; the relationship seemed to be mediated by other organizational (e.g., size), process (e.g., staff shortages) and contextual factors (e.g., regional spread of COVID-19) in comparison to ownership directly.

In July, the Canadian Broadcasting Corporation reported on a provincial long-term care home inspector, in Ontario, who was under investigation for her use of social media to post health misinformation. Her views were described by the Registered Nurses Association of Ontario CEO as "the most extreme example I have seen in my own profession."

Six corporations together owning and operating 200 long-term care homes—experienced "unusually high rates of COVID-19 infection and related deaths." In March 2024, the Ontario Superior Court certified class action lawsuits against Chartwell Retirement Residences, Extendicare, Responsive Group, Revera, Schlegel Villages, and Sienna Senior Living for gross negligence on behalf of thousands of people who contracted COVID-19 during the pandemic after visiting these homes or residing in them.

== France ==
About a third of reported coronavirus deaths have occurred among residents—more than 3,000—causing the homes to run low on body bags. More than 2,300 homes have had at least one case reported. Nursing home residents are being isolated in their rooms to slow the spread of the disease, while hospitals are reluctant to admit patients who have little chance of recovering. Most elderly requiring care in France live in EHPADs.

== Germany ==
On 18 March, the first case was identified at the Hanns-Lije retirement home in Wolfsburg. On 31 March, at least 17 died from COVID-19 in this residence.

On 2 April, Robert Koch of the Institute in Germany affirmed that as of 1000 German deceased, 87% were older than 70 years. Of these, more than 50 were residents in nursing homes in Bavaria, Cologne and Wolfsburg. By 9 April, 29 residents of the nursing home in the city of Wolfsbrg died.

== Italy ==
As of 9 April, 3,859 people have died in care homes operated by RSA since 1 February of whom 133 tested positive and 1,310 had symptoms consistent with coronavirus. Prosecutors are investigating a home in Milan where 27 residents died of suspected coronavirus infection during the first week of April.

== Russia ==
The first officially confirmed case of Coronavirus disease 2019 (COVID-19) in Russian nursing homes for elderly and disabled people was located the town of Vyazma, on April 11, 2020.

Deputy Minister of Ministry of Labour and Social Protection Olga Batalina reported on April 23, 2020, that 450 Russians living in nursing homes were infected with the COVID-19, and diseases were registered in seven regions of Russia. The Ministry of Labor and Social Protection of the Russian Federation called in April 2020 to close all care homes in full quarantine. At the beginning of May 2020, Elizaveta Oleskina, an employee of the Charity Fund "Starost v Radost" (Old Age in Joy), reported that there were cases of COVID-19 in nursing homes for elderly people in 20 Russian regions.

The number of the elderly or disabled people living in Russian nursing homes is estimated (as on 2020) about 280.000.

Russia has also increasing number of the private elderly care homes. The number of the elderly, living in Russian private care homes, was estimated (as on 2020) about 25.000, but no open information available about the cases of the COVID-19 in the private care homes.

Human Rights Watch declared on 2 June 2020, that Russian government must openly publish all the data about the cases of COVID-19 in the Russian care homes because there were information about silencing of the facts that may increase risk of occurring of the disease outbreaks in the care homes.

== Spain ==
Many nursing homes in Spain are understaffed because they are for-profit businesses and elderly Spaniards cannot necessarily afford sufficient care; the salary for most workers is less than €1,000 per month. Even before the crisis, safety violations occurred frequently. The lack of PPE and inability to quarantine infected individuals exacerbated the spread of the disease. In some nursing homes, elderly victims were found abandoned in their beds by Spanish soldiers mounting emergency response. Defense minister Margarita Robles said anyone guilty of neglect will be prosecuted. By 18 April 38 residences were under investigation. Some hospitals refused to admit sick people from nursing homes. Thousands of elder care workers have been infected. By 18 April, more than 13,600 Spaniards in nursing homes who were probable or confirmed coronavirus cases had died, including ten per cent of nursing home residents in the Community of Madrid, while at least 39,000 were infected according to incomplete figures as some communities were not deaggregating their figures.

== United Kingdom ==
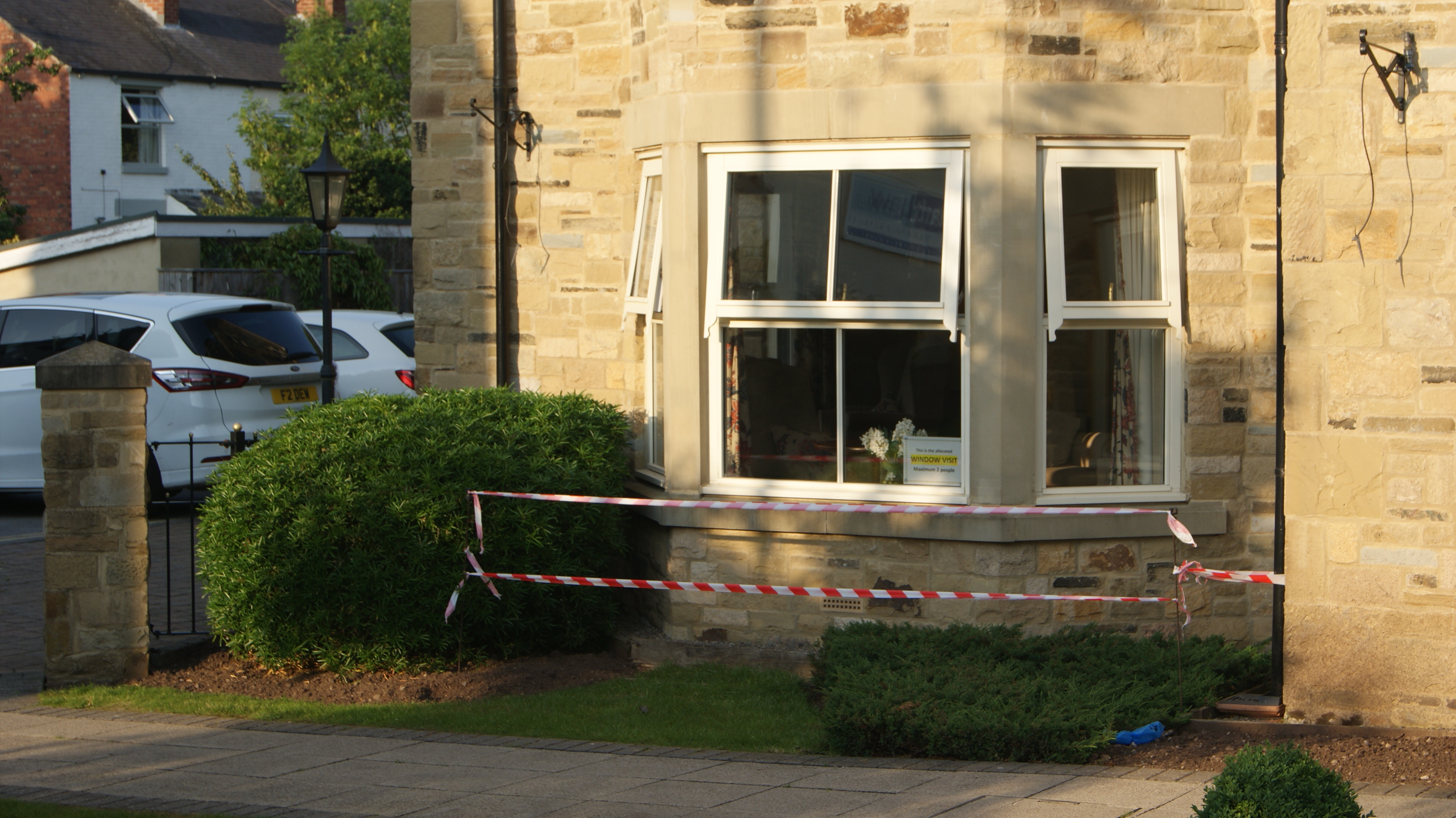
A 'visiting window' at a nursing home in Wetherby, West Yorkshire designed to reduce transmission to vulnerable residents.

The death rate in care homes accelerated in April. Beginning 29 April, health secretary Matt Hancock said the government would begin daily reports of separate statistics for these facilities. This announcement was made after 4,343 deaths were reported in care homes between April 10–24; half of those deaths occurred during the last five days of the period.

Sky News correspondent Alex Crawford wrote an editorial about care homes in general, and in relation to COVID, suggesting the situation was a "scandal" that future generations would question. She also noted care assistants' working conditions, including zero hour contracts, and homes urging sick employees to come in anyway.

To prevent bringing COVID-19 into the facility, assistants at Liverpool's Beechside Home have moved in, as of April 2020. Nearby Oak Spring has had 14 deaths in two weeks, as of mid-April; only two of the deceased were tested, and both were positive for COVID-19. As of early April, that facility was operating with a quarter of its normal staffing, after the staff or their families were exhibiting symptoms, and were self isolating. Two-thirds of remaining residents were exhibiting symptoms. The Member of Parliament for Liverpool, Paula Barker, has criticised the lack of PPE at social care facilities, compared to NHS workers.

== United States ==
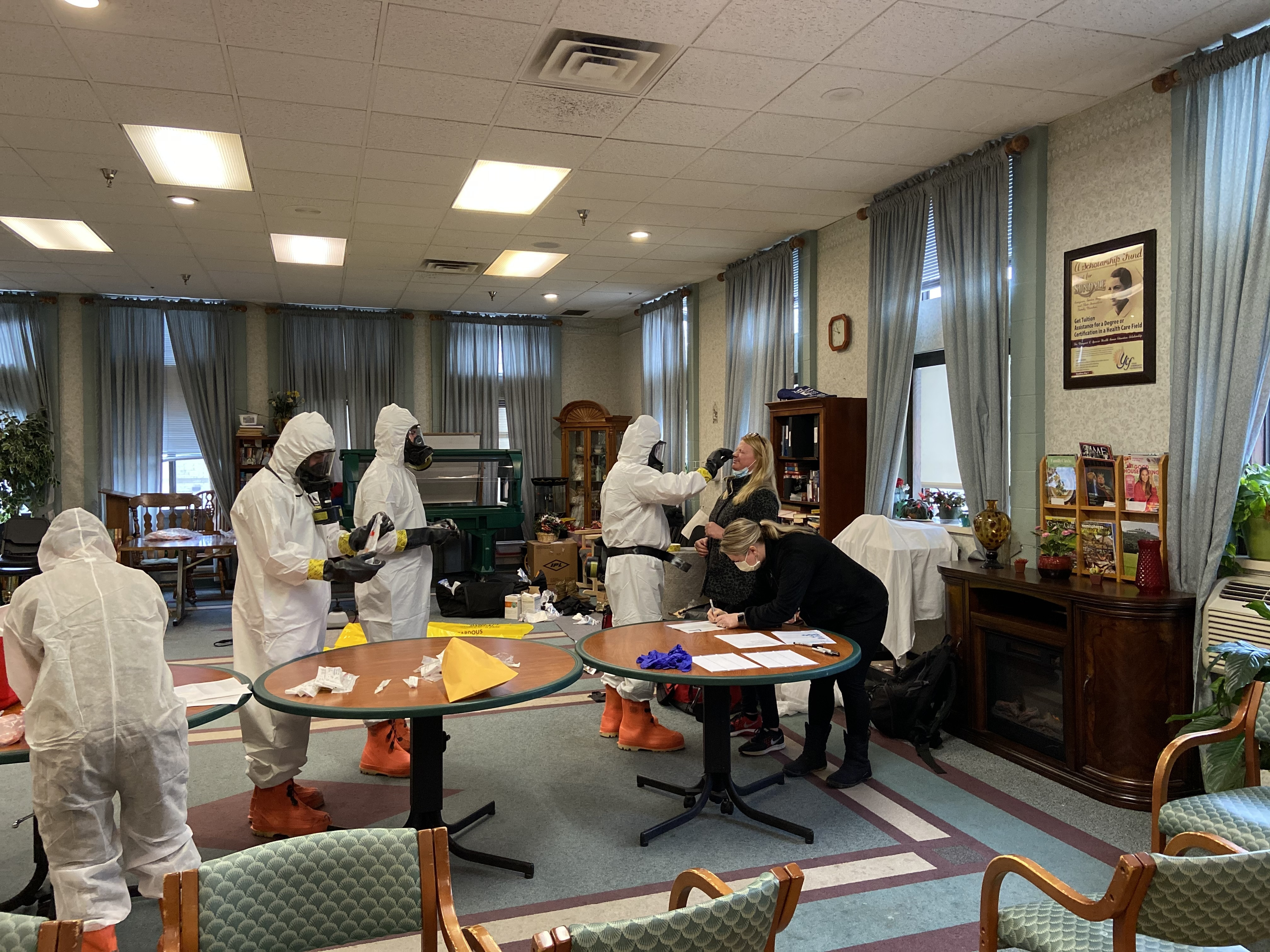
West Virginia National Guard assist nursing home staff with pandemic

By mid-April 2020, over 7,000 deaths were reported in American nursing homes—about a fifth of the national death toll—and over 36,500 residents and employees had tested positive. (Many facilities were not reporting cases or deaths, implying that the actual toll was higher.) By mid-June, 50,000 deaths—nearly half the national death toll—had been reported in nursing homes.

By April, in addition to steps taken by individual facilities, the federal government had barred visitors, ended group activities, and instituted a mandatory testing regime for workers. These steps alone do not necessarily prevent infections. Infection control problems were identified at nine locations of Life Care Centers of America during April and early May, as government inspectors identified violations of federal standards.

While some affected facilities are understaffed and have a history of safety violations, others are luxury facilities with excellent records. Regarding testing for coronavirus, the federal government designated long-term care facilities as lower priority than hospitals, leading to longer wait times for test results.

Even though the COVID-19 being widely available, by June 13, 2021, approximately 40 percent of nursing home staff members remained unvaccinated. Long-term care facilities offered incentives such as gift cards, raffles, cash, and T-shirts to staff members in an attempt to increase the vaccination rate.

Studies have found that unionized nursing homes had lower resident COVID-19 death rates and lower infection rates for workers.

=== California ===
Data analysis by the Los Angeles Times in May found that about half of all coronavirus deaths happened in skilled nursing or assisted living facilities. Governor Gavin Newsom had announced on April 10 that some healthy residents at nursing homes would be transferred to USNS Mercy, a US Navy hospital ship. The vessel previously was only expected to take patients from southern California hospitals, to free up space there for COVID-19 patients. Six hundred nurses with infectious disease control training were being dispatched to nursing homes and adult care facilities to contain the disease. Some facilities have reorganized residents into discreet buildings for those with and without the virus.

=== Florida ===
As of mid-April 2020, Florida Governor Ron DeSantis was considering a request to grant nursing homes "sovereign immunity" from negligence lawsuits during the pandemic. The request was made by a trade group that represents nearly 700 nursing homes in the state.

=== Massachusetts ===
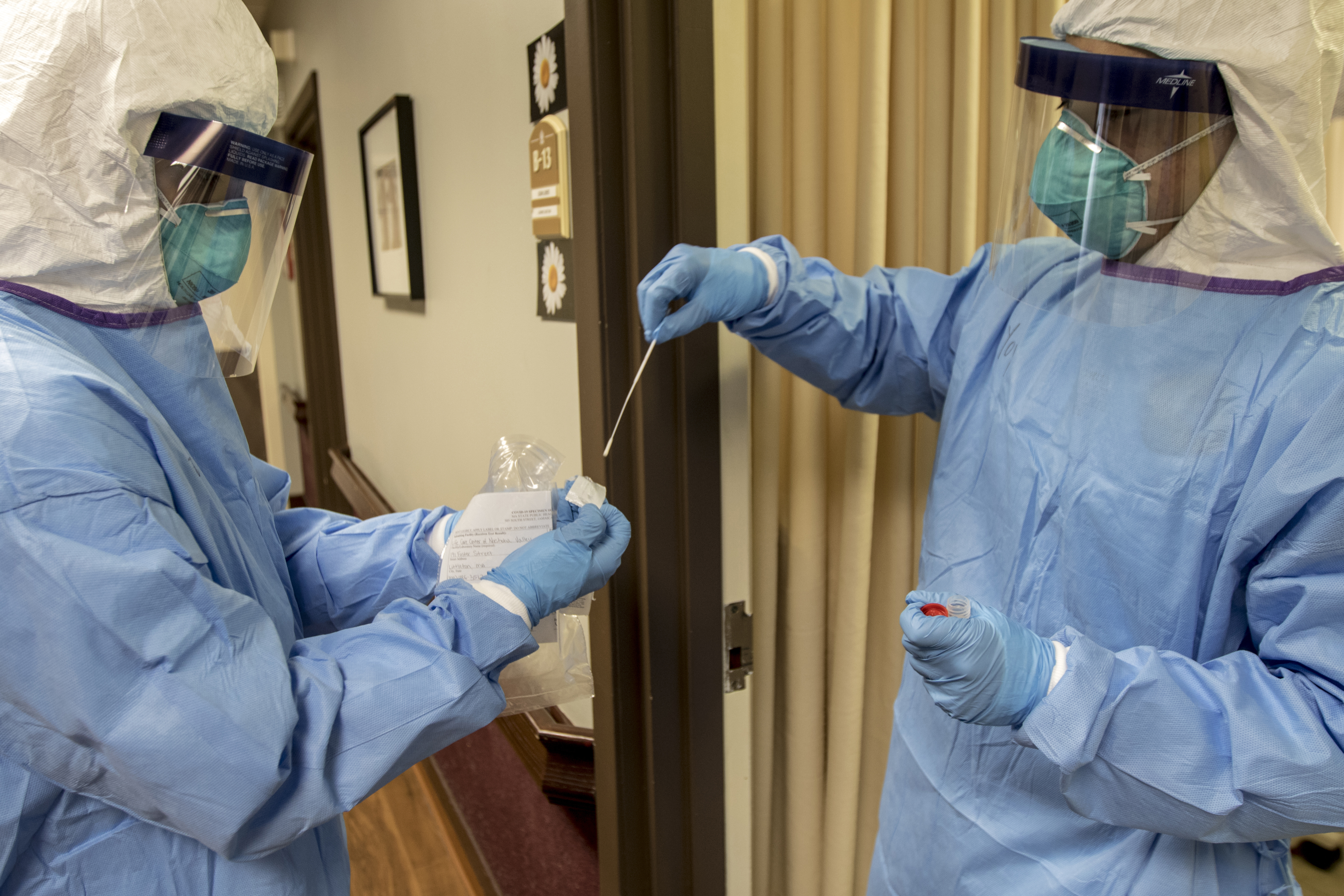
A medic with the Massachusetts National Guard and a resident of the Life Care Center of Nashoba Valley nursing home handle a nasal swab that will be used to test for COVID-19

Life Care Center of Nashoba Valley experienced an outbreak in April 2020. The nurse who reported the outbreak later died of the virus.

One of the most severe outbreaks was at the state-run Holyoke Soldiers' Home for aging veterans. In late March, there were 210 residents; by late May, 74 of them had died with a COVID-19 diagnosis. Dozens of employees also tested positive. Because the facility is funded by taxpayers and not by Medicare, it is not subject to inspections by Centers for Medicare Services. It is not inspected by the Massachusetts Department of Public Health, either. Following the outbreak, at least four state and federal investigations were opened into the facility.

=== Maryland ===
Sagepoint Senior Living was fined $10,000/day by state regulators. The facility was notified on May 6, 2020, that the fine would be retroactive to March 30 and would continue until Sagepoint complied with state health regulations. At the time of the notification, 34 residents and 1 employee had died from COVID-19 in the 165-bed facility.

=== Michigan ===
Gov. Gretchen Whitmer issued an executive order that nursing homes must readmit residents previously diagnosed with COVID-19.

=== Minnesota ===
The state of Minnesota held a legislative hearing on 7 April into the senior care industry, weeks into a lockdown. The executive director of one facility noted that her residents are showing signs of depression and anxiety from the confinement. Not only does the elderly population in long-term care facilities face depression, the disabled population in both long-term care facilities and independent people are struggling with depression and anxiety.

=== New Jersey ===
As of 17 April, two thirds of the state's long-term facilities—a total of 394—had reported cases of the virus, with 1,500 deaths linked to nursing facilities, about 40% of the state's death count. One facility, Andover Subacute and Rehabilitation Center II, with 543 beds, had a record of safety problems and inadequate staffing. After an anonymous tip, police found seventeen bodies in bags on 13 April. Seventy residents had died of the disease by 19 April. Federal and state investigators have launched an investigation into the facility.

=== New York ===
As of early April, in New York state's 613 licensed facilities, there were nearly 5,000 COVID diagnoses. By mid-April, 72 facilities had five or more confirmed deaths; Cobble Hill Health Center in Brooklyn reported 55 deaths. By early May, it was estimated that 5,000 people had died in nursing homes in New York state. On February 12, 2021, it was reported that the office of New York Governor Andrew Cuomo had sent over 9,000 patients into nursing homes early in the pandemic.

=== Washington ===
A Life Care Center facility in Kirkland, Washington was the source of a major outbreak of COVID-19 first reported on 19 February 2020, which became the first outbreak in a United States nursing home. On February 19 there were 120 residents and 180 Center employees at the facility. By 18 March, 101 of the residents had been diagnosed with COVID-19, and thirty-four residents had died, for a case fatality rate of 33.7%. On 2 April 2020 Life Care Center was fined $611,000 for deficiencies in its response to the outbreak, and has until 16 September 2020 to correct the deficiencies, or else face termination of its participation in the Medicare/Medicaid program.
