= Lake Gibson =

Lake Gibson can refer to:

- Lake Gibson (Florida), a lake in Polk County
- Lake Gibson (Ontario), a reservoir in the Niagara Region

== See also ==
- Gibson Lake (disambiguation)
- Lake Gibson High School, Lakeland, Florida
