= White River (Ontario) =

Tributary of Lake Superior in Thunder Bay District, Ontario, Canada

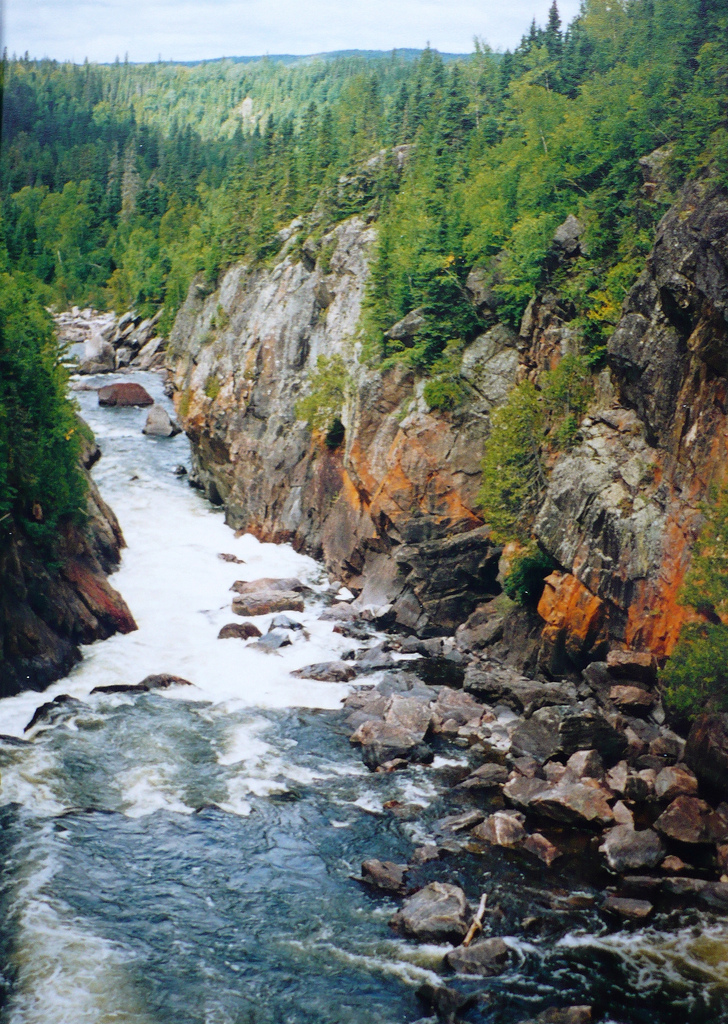

- Location within Ontario

Location
- Country: Canada
- Province: Ontario
- Districts: Algoma, Thunder Bay

Physical characteristics
- Source: Negwazu Lake
  - location: Unorg. North Algoma
  - coordinates: 48°28′22″N 85°02′47″W
  - elevation: 415 m (1,363 ft)
- Mouth: Lake Superior
  - location: Pukaskwa National Park, Thunder Bay District
  - coordinates: 48°32′49″N 86°16′6″W
  - elevation: 183 m (600 ft)

The White River (French: rivière White) is a tributary of Lake Superior in Thunder Bay District, Ontario, Canada. It starts at Negwazu Lake and flows in a predominantly western direction to Lake Superior, passing through the Township of White River.

The White River has many stretches of whitewater and four waterfalls with some difficult portages, making the river suitable for advanced canoeists. The lower part of the river has occasional oxbows and meanders. Among its tributaries are the Bremner, Depew, and Oskabukuta Rivers. The river contains a diversity of fish species, including healthy walleye populations.

== Provincial parks ==
Several sections of the river are protected in parks and reserves. The Pokei Lake/White River Wetlands Provincial Park is about 15 kilometres (9.3 mi) southeast of the town of White River. This 1,768 hectares (4,370 acres) non-operating park includes a very large inland riparian wetland system of various types, that form flood plains along roughly 10 kilometres (6.2 mi) of the White River.

Directly south of the White Lake outlet, the river flows briefly through the White Lake Forest Reserve. Then follows the White Lake Provincial Park Addition, which protects a 55 kilometres (34 mi) long stretch of the lower White River, from Brothers geographic township to the boundary of Pukaskwa National Park. This 200 metres (660 ft) wide natural corridor on both sides of the river was added to the pre-existing provincial park in 2006 to protect a notable canoe route, used by Aboriginal people and recorded in 1827 as the "Wabista or White River– navigable for small canoes". The White River in this section flows through 16 landform vegetation combinations, and drops 90 metres (300 ft) or about four metres per kilometre.

The remaining 14 kilometres (8.7 mi) of the river is protected in the Pukaskwa National Park. There the river is crossed by the White River Suspension Bridge, set 23 metres (75 ft) above the Chigamiwinigum Falls.

== Hydroelectricity ==
The White River system has 3 hydroelectric generating stations (all located within the White Lake Provincial Park):

Gitchi Animki Bezhig (Big Thunder One) and Gitchi Animki Niizh (Big Thunder Two) are 2 installations about 10 kilometres (6.2 mi) apart, with a combined generating capacity of 18.9 MW. Completed in 2016 and owned by a joint venture of the Pic Mobert First Nation and Regional Power, the facilities replace an old dam that regulated lake levels and flood flows on White Lake.

Umbata Falls hydroelectric generation station is approximately 30 kilometres (19 mi) southeast of Marathon, just east of the Pukaskwa Park boundary. It is a run-of-the-river type facility with a head of 32.8 metres (108 ft) and capacity of 23 MW. It was commissioned in 2008 and co-owned by the Pic River First Nation and Innergex Group.

== See also ==
- List of rivers of Ontario
- Pukaskwa River - nearby river with similar characteristics
