= Extendicare =

Private for-profit corporation that operates LTC and retirement facilities in Canada

Extendicare Inc.
- Type: Public
- Traded as: TSX: EXE
- Industry: Seniors' housing
- Founded: 1968
- Headquarters: Markham, Ontario, Canada
- Number of locations: Alberta, Ontario, Saskatchewan
- Key people: Michael Guerriere (CEO)
- Revenue: CA$1,155.3 million (2020)
- Number of employees: 23,000 (2018)
- Website: extendicare.com

Extendicare Inc. is a Canadian for-profit long-term care (LTC) provider that offers housing, care and related services to seniors. It operates over 100 care facilities and is based in Markham, Ontario. The company operates retirement residences and long-term care facilities under the Extendicare, Esprit Lifestyle and ParaMed brands, with 23,000 employees.

In 2006, the company became a real estate investment trust (REIT) and began trading on the Toronto Stock Exchange (TSX) under the symbol EXE.UN on November 10, 2006. In 2012, the company completed its conversion from an income trust structure named Extendicare Real Estate Investment Trust to a corporate structure named Extendicare Inc.

Extendicare owns and operates dozens of long-term care and retirement facilities, with the majority in Ontario and 11% in Alberta. The company has a number of significant subsidiaries and divisions, including ParaMed, Esprit Lifestyle Communities, Extendicare Assist, Closing the Gap Healthcare Group (in 2025) and its Purchasing Partner Network division, SGP.

From January to September 2020, Extendicare paid out about CA$29 million to shareholders. During the same period, Extendicare's ParaMed division received CA$82.2 million from the Canada Emergency Wage Subsidy (CEWS). The company said that government funds went to LTC workers directly, not towards dividends.

== Board of directors ==
Michael Guerriere has been the president and CEO of Extendicare since 2018. Prior to that, Guerriere was CMO and VP at TELUS Health from 2002 to 2018, and with Courtyard Group, which was acquired by TELUS Health in 2002. Others in leadership roles (according to the 2020 annual report) include CFO and VP David E. Bacon, VP Victor Rocca, CFO HRO Leslie Sarauer, VP John Toffoletto, Bruce Wienberg, and CMO Matthew Morgan. Other board members include Alan D. Torrie, Norma Beauchamp, Sandra L. Hanington, Alan R. Hibben, Brent Houlden, Donna E. Kingelin, Samir Manji, and Al Mawani.

== Segments and subsidiaries ==
According to its 2020 Annual Report, the company earned a total of CA$1,155.3 million in revenue in 2020. Its segments include long-term care—which generated a revenue of CA$715.6 million, retirement living, home health care, "contract services, consulting and group purchasing", and corporate activities, among others.

In Canada, the company has significant subsidiaries, including Extendicare Inc., ParaMed Inc., Harvest Retirement Community Inc., Stonebridge Crossing Retirement Community Inc., Empire Crossing Retirement Community Inc., Yorkton Crossing Retirement Community Inc., West Park Crossing Retirement Community Inc., Bolton Mills Retirement Community Inc., Douglas Crossing Retirement Community Inc., Lynde Creek Manor Retirement Community Inc., 9994165 Canada Inc., Riverbend Crossing Retirement Community Inc., and Cedar Crossing Retirement Community Inc. It also has a significant subsidiary in Bermuda, the Laurier Indemnity Company, Ltd.

By 2020, most of Extendicare's LTC and retirement facilities were in two provinces – about 77% in Ontario and 11% in Alberta. In 2020, Extendicare owned and operated 58 LTC facilities, and Esprit Lifestyle Communities owned and operated 11 retirement living facilities. Through the Extendicare Assist division, the company also provided 52 facilities with contract services. The Purchasing Partner Network division—SGP—contracts purchases of "food, capital equipment, furnishings, cleaning and nursing supplies, and office products".

== COVID-19 pandemic ==
The company had "no plan to deal with" the coronavirus and in the early days of the COVID-19 pandemic in Canada, 80 people in the care of Extendicare died "after contracting COVID-19". The company spent CA$300,000 of its "own money on COVID-19, while distributing over $10,000,000 to shareholders during the pandemic", according to its May 28, 2020 Annual General Meeting.

During the pandemic—from January to September 30, 2020—revenues from the company's long-term-care facilities rose to CA$523.4 million, compared to CA$477.1 million in the same period in 2019.

=== Extendicare Parkside ===
By December 2020, 38 residents with COVID-19 had died in Parkside Extendicare in Regina, Saskatchewan. The outbreak was declared on November 20, 2020, and two weeks later, there were 50 residents that had tested positive for COVID-19. By March 21, it was confirmed by Saskatchewan Health Authority (SHA) that 41 people had died at Extendicare Parkside from the virus and over 200 residents and staff tested had positive for COVID-19 during the outbreak. In response to the second wave Extendicare Parkside outbreak, the Provincial Ombudsman began an investigation at the request of the Government of Saskatchewan. On December 9, SHA into a co-management agreement with Parkside Extendicare which lasted into 2021.

By March 2020, families of those who died in Extendicare facilities in Saskatchewan, represented by Regina-based lawyer Tony Merchant, prepared to file a class-action lawsuit for substandard care in Extendicare's long-term care facilities. According to Merchant, of the 117 people who died from COVID-19 in the province's care homes from the beginning of the outbreak to the middle of March 2020, 35% were in Extendicare facilities when they died. On October 12, 2022, the Saskatchewan Health Authority and the ECI group formally agreed that the SHA would assume responsibility for five Saskatchewan based Long Term Care Extendicare facilities. Details of the agreement include the transition of nearly 1,300 Extendicare staff to the SHA and the purchase of all five properties (one in Saskatoon, one in Moose Jaw and three in Regina).

=== Financial support to LTC facilities ===
The Ontario Ministry of LTC provided COVID funding of CA$398.0 million, "which included $268.0 million in funding for COVID prevention and containment efforts". According to their 2020 annual report, they received CA$6.6 million in the spring of 2021 for the FY 2020.

According to a Toronto Star analysis of Extendicare's 2020 financial statements, in the first 3 quarters ending in September 2020, this for-profit company paid out nearly CA$29 million to shareholders in dividends at the same time that ParaMed received CA$82.2 million in federal wage subsidies through the program for front-line workers, the Canada Emergency Wage Subsidy (CEWS). The Star investigation included the three major for-profit LTC providers, Sienna Senior Living, Chartwell Retirement Residences, as well as Extendicare. The companies said that the CEWS grants went directly to their frontline workers and were not to pay dividends.

=== Class-action lawsuits and regulatory actions ===
There have been several COVID-related lawsuits filed against Extendicare facilities.

These lawsuits include an October 2020 CA$600,000 class action lawsuit with multiple defendants against multiple homes and levels of government, a second CA$210 class action lawsuit alleging "gross negligence" filed in October 2020, regarding one of Extendicare's LTC facilities—later amended to include claims against 35 Extendicare's operations.

In November 2020, the Ontario government, under Premier Doug Ford passed Bill 218, Supporting Ontario's Recovery Act—retroactive to March 17, 2020—which provides some liability protections to individuals, corporations, or other entities, including LTC corporations, against COVID-19-related legal claims that limit claimants ability to win a lawsuit "except in certain circumstances". Claimants must prove that an individual, corporation, or other entity acted in "gross negligence", not in a "good faith" or "honest" effort to comply with public health guidance and laws relating to COVID-19.

== See also ==
- Sienna Senior Living
- Chartwell Retirement Residences
