= White Lake Provincial Park (Ontario) =

Provincial park in Ontario

- IUCN category II (national park)
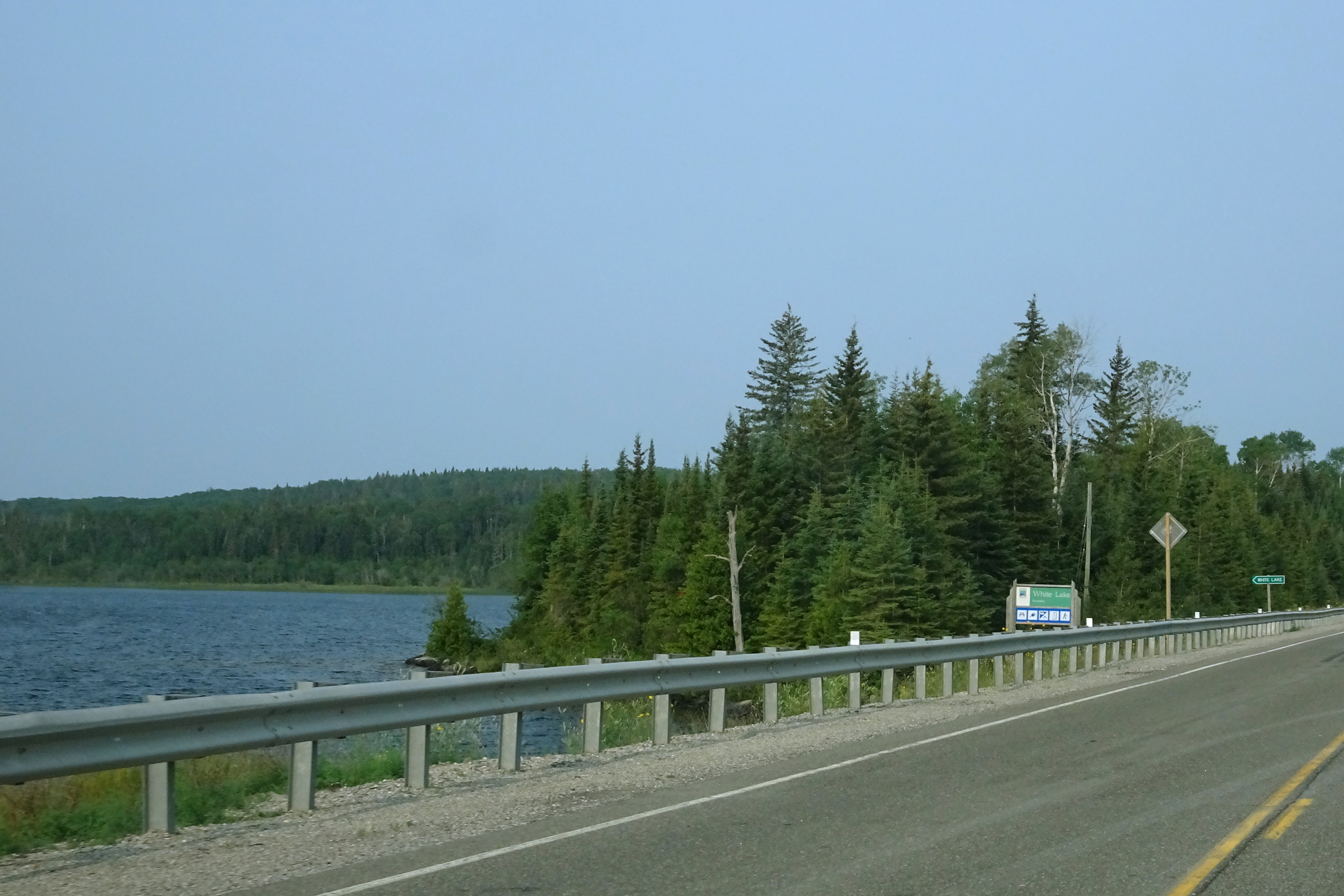

- Location within Ontario
- Interactive map of White Lake Provincial Park
- Location: Thunder Bay District, Northeastern Ontario, Canada
- Nearest town: White River, Ontario
- Coordinates: 48°41′57″N 85°40′23″W
- Area: 4,048 ha (15.63 sq mi)
- Designation: Natural environment
- Established: 1963
- Visitors: 33,961 (in 2022)
- Governing body: Ontario Parks
- Website: www.ontarioparks.com/park/whitelake

White Lake Provincial Park is a park in the Thunder Bay District of Northern Ontario, Canada, along Highway 17, north of Lake Superior.

The park, 35 kilometres (22 mi) west of the township of White River, includes portions of the shore of White Lake featuring sandy beaches and marshes. Once an abundant source of fur and lumber, it now offers natural treasures such as orchids and bogs with insect-eating plants.

It is an operating park with facilities and services, including 188 campsites (60 of which have electrical service), docks and boat launch, nature trails, beaches, and playground. The park is used for biking, boating, canoeing, hiking, swimming, fishing, and hunting (only permitted in the park addition).

== Description ==
The park consists of two distinct portions, separated by the White Lake Forest Reserve (which may be added to the park once mining claims expire):

- the original park between Dunc Lake and the south end of the namesake White Lake, which opened in 1962 and covers 1,723 hectares (4,260 acres). This part of the park is divided into three usage zones: a development zone (with the park's facilities and services), a natural environment zone, and two nature reserve zones (protecting significant natural features, including the only-known stand of red pines in the central area of Lake Superior).
- a 55-kilometre (34 mi) long stretch of the lower White River, from the township of Brothers to the boundary of Pukaskwa National Park. This 200-metre (660 ft) wide natural corridor on both sides of the river was added in 2006 to protect a notable canoe route, used by Aboriginal people and recorded in 1827 as the "Wabista or White River – navigable for small canoes". The White River in this section flows through 16 landform vegetation combinations. It had 20 sets of rapids and four waterfalls (before the construction of generating stations) with some difficult portages, making the river suitable for advanced canoeists.

Of the new parks and park additions established under the Ontario's Living Legacy Strategy, the White Lake Provincial Park Addition is the only one with an exceptional provision for hydroelectric activity as a non-conforming use. This allowed the construction of three hydroelectric generating stations along the White River in the park: the Umbata Falls station developed and operated by the Pic River First Nation in 2008, and the Gitchi Animki Bezhig (Big Thunder One) and Gitchi Animki Niizh (Big Thunder Two) stations developed and operated by the Pic Mobert First Nation in 2016.

== Flora and fauna ==
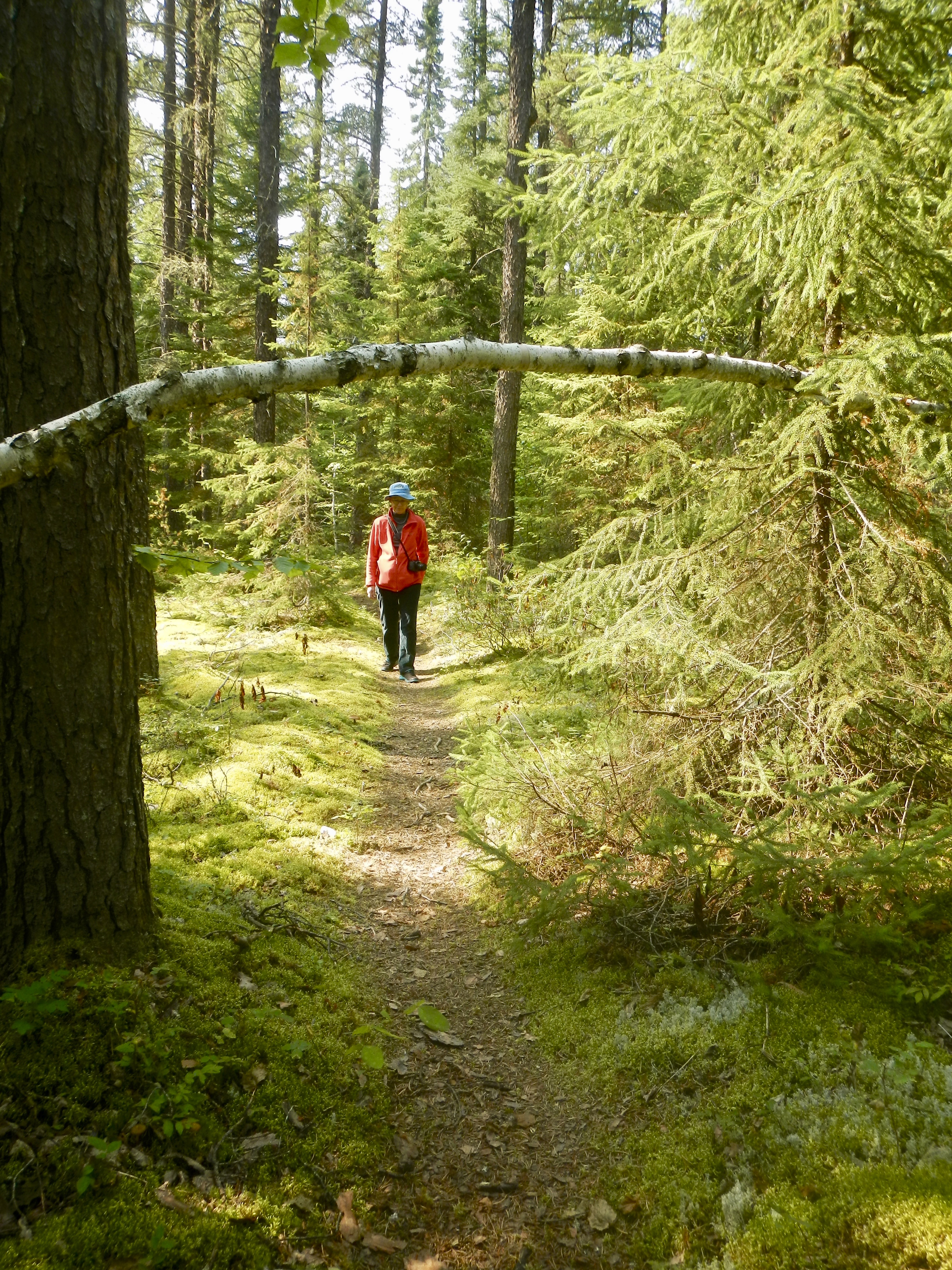
Hiking trail in White Lake Provincial Park

Nature in the park is characterized by till-covered hills with mixed boreal forests, sand flats, and wetlands with many orchid species. Its forests are mostly dominated by aspen and jack pine. It also has uncommon plant species for this latitude, such as red pine, and wetland vegetation typical of the southern boreal region. The addition to the park along the White River has boreal forests with high concentrations of conifer, as well as sections of poplar, mixed deciduous, and mixed deciduous/coniferous forest.

There is abundant wildlife in the park, such as moose, fox, porcupine and beaver. Bird species seen in the park include loons, osprey, bald eagles, great blue herons, owls, ruffed grouse, woodpeckers and many other songbirds. White Lake, a 65 square kilometres (25 sq mi) lake, is good for fishing walleye and northern pike.
