= Partridge Lake =

Partridge Lake may refer to:

Canada

- Partridge Lake (BC-Yukon)
- Ontario
  - Partridge Lake (Partridge River), in Cochrane District
  - Partridge Lake (Lennox and Addington County)
  - Thunder Bay District
    - Partridge Lake (Fox River)
    - Partridge Lake (Namewaminikan River)

United States

- Partridge Lake (Wisconsin)
