= Fox River (Thunder Bay District) =

- Location of the mouth of the Fox River in Ontario

Location
- Country: Canada
- Province: Ontario
- Region: Northwestern Ontario
- District: Thunder Bay

Physical characteristics
- Source: Unnamed lake
  - coordinates: 48°20′37″N 85°27′53″W
  - elevation: 506 m (1,660 ft)
- Mouth: Pukaskwa River
  - coordinates: 48°13′55″N 85°37′06″W
  - elevation: 378 m (1,240 ft)

Basin features
- River system: Great Lakes Basin

The Fox River is a river in Thunder Bay District in Northwestern Ontario, Canada. It is in the Great Lakes Basin and is a right tributary of the Pukaskwa River, which it enters within Pukaskwa National Park.

== Course ==
The river begins at an unnamed lake and flows southwest into Partridge Lake and then onward into Fox Lake. It continues southwest, enters Pukaskwa National Park, and reaches its mouth at the Pukaskwa River, which flows to Lake Superior.

== See also ==
- List of rivers of Ontario

== Sources ==
- Map 14 (PDF) (Map). 1 : 1,600,000. Official road map of Ontario. Ministry of Transportation of Ontario. 2014.
- Restructured municipalities - Ontario map #2 (Map). Restructuring Maps of Ontario. Ontario Ministry of Municipal Affairs and Housing. 2006. Archived from the original on 2014-04-10.
