= Partridge Lake (Fox River) =

- Location in Ontario
- Location: Thunder Bay District, Ontario
- Coordinates: 48°18′56″N 85°31′29″W
- Type: Lake
- Part of: Great Lakes Basin
- Primary inflows: Fox River
- Primary outflows: Fox River
- Basin countries: Canada
- Max. length: 810 metres (2,660 ft)
- Max. width: 580 metres (1,900 ft)
- Surface elevation: 418 metres (1,371 ft)

Partridge Lake is a lake in Thunder Bay District in Northwestern Ontario, Canada. It is in the Great Lakes Basin, and is on the Fox River system. There are three inflows: two unnamed, at the northwest, and the Fox River at the northeast. The primary outflow, at the south, is the Fox River, which flows via the Pukaskwa River to Lake Superior.
