= Tip Top Mountain =

- Location within Ontario

Highest point
- Elevation: 641 m (2,103 ft)
- Coordinates: 48°16′N 86°00′W

Geography
- Location: Pukaskwa National Park, Ontario, Canada
- Parent range: Canadian Shield, unnamed range
- Topo map: NTS 42D8 Oiseau Bay

Tip Top Mountain is located in Pukaskwa National Park in Ontario, Canada. Its summit is 641 meters (2,103 feet) above sea level. There are no hiking trails leading to the peak, making it difficult to climb.
