= Capstone Infrastructure =

Canadian energy investment company

Capstone Infrastructure Corporation
- Type: Public
- Traded as: TSX: CSE.PR.A
- Industry: Electricity Generation
- Headquarters: Toronto, Canada
- Key people: Michael Bernstein, President & CEO
- Revenue: C$138.48m
- Operating income: C$20.91m
- Net income: C$11.26m
- Subsidiaries: Clean Power Operating Trust
- Website: https://capstoneinfrastructure.com/

Capstone Infrastructure Corporation, formerly known as Macquarie Power & Infrastructure Income Fund (MP&I), is a Toronto, Ontario-based open-ended trust that invests in various types of power generation such as natural gas cogeneration, wind, hydro, biomass and solar.

== Corporate history ==
Macquarie Power & Infrastructure Income Fund (MP&I) first listed on the Toronto Stock Exchange in April 2004 as Macquarie Power Income Fund with the 156MW Cardinal natural gas plant as its sole asset. In April 2005, the fund's founding President & CEO Bob Rollison announced a broader acquisition strategy that would include infrastructure assets beyond the energy sector.

=== Leisureworld Acquisition and Divestiture ===
This broader mandate allowed MP&I to acquire 45% of Leisureworld, an operator of long-term care facilities in Ontario, in 2005. However, management opted to divest this asset in 2009, arguing that they wanted to focus more on "core infrastructure categories, such as power generation, electricity transmission or distribution, and utilities and transportation."

== Subsidiaries and related firms ==
=== Regional Power ===
Regional Power, a subsidiary of Manulife Financial, oversees the day-to-day operations at MP&I's four hydro facilities (Sechelt, Hluey Lakes, Dryden and Wawatay).

=== Clean Energy Income Fund ===
In June 2007, MP&I completed the purchase of Clean Power Income Fund, which roughly doubled its assets. This transaction marked MP&I's entry into the renewable energy market, as it acquired one wind farm (Erie Shores), four hydro projects (Sechelt, Hluey Lakes, Wawatay and Dryden), the Whitecourt biomass plant, and a 31.3% interest in the Chapais biomass plant.

== Projects ==
=== Operational Power Projects ===
Name	Location	Fuel Source	Capacity (MW)	Ref
Cardinal	Ontario	Natural Gas	156	
Erie Shores	Ontario	Wind	99	
Ganaraska	Ontario	Wind	17	
Sechelt	British Columbia	Hydro	16	
Hluey Lakes	British Columbia	Hydro	3	
Wawatay	Ontario	Hydro	14	
Dryden	Ontario	Hydro	3	
Whitecourt	Alberta	Biomass	25	
Chapais	Québec	Biomass	28	

=== Projects under construction ===
MP&I is developing a 20MW solar park in Amherstburg, Ontario. SunPower has been contracted to design, build and operate the facility, which has been awarded a 30-year Power Purchase Agreement by the Ontario Power Authority.
