= CHSLD Herron =

Long-term care nursing home in Quebec, Canada

- Katasa Groupe + Développement

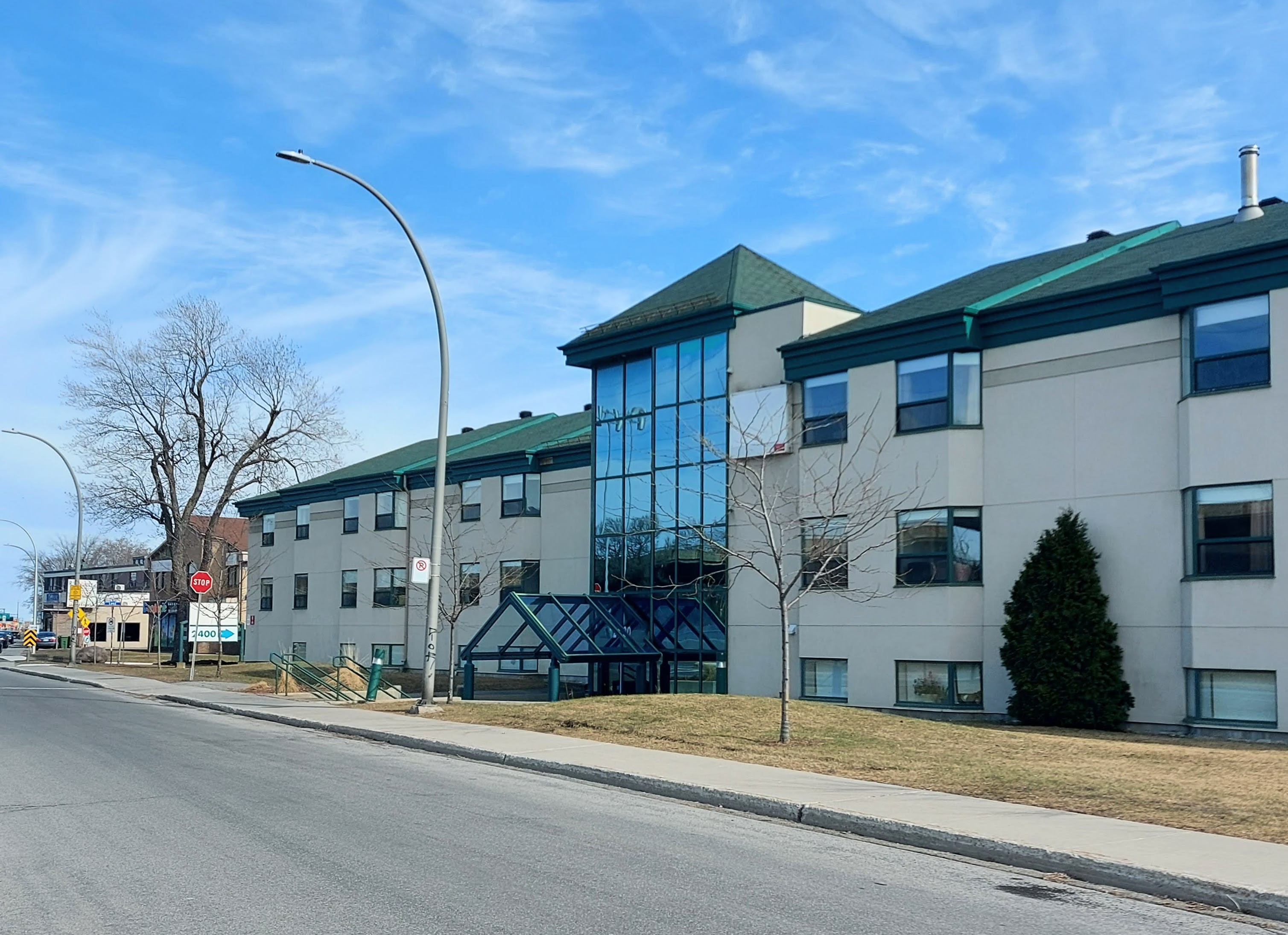
- Résidence Herron in 2021

Geography
- Location: Dorval, Montreal Island, Quebec, Canada
- Coordinates: 45.4487°N 73.7792°W

Organization
- Care system: Private facility
- Type: Nursing home
- Network: CIUSS de l'Ouest-de-l'Île-de-Montréal (Note: government overseer)

History
- Former names: Résidence Herron; Maison Herron
- Opened: 1988

Links
- Website: Official website

CHSLD Herron, also known as Résidence Herron, was a long-term care facility (French: centre d'hébergement de soins de longue durée) located in Dorval, Quebec, Canada; a suburb of Montreal; near Lake Saint-Louis. The property was acquired by Katasa Groupe in 2015.

The facility gained attention in April 2020 during the coronavirus pandemic, as it was reported that most staff had abandoned the facility, leading to a police investigation and government takeover of the facility that exposed deaths and neglect of residents.

== History ==
The facility opened in 1988.

The facility was previously known as Maison Herron (English: Herron House), and was owned by Chartwell Inc. According to Michel Amar, consultant for the Katasa group, the Herron center operated an annual operating deficit of around $300,000 at the time, the occupancy rate was only 55%.

On 11 November 2015, the Groupe Katasa inc. purchased the facility. Operating as a holding company, its largest shareholder is The Choueri Family Trust. Its president and secretary, Samir Emile Choueiri has been in office since 2010. The corporation has six other retirement homes. It is a family business where the president is the largest majority shareholder. Decisions are made by the president and his three daughters. In the fall of 2015, one of the president's daughters (Catherine) was responsible for the management of Centre-Herron and Centre-Pierrefonds. Another of the president's daughters manages residences in Gatineau and the third takes care of property management.

In November 2015, an increase in the occupancy rate for the year 2016 is set to increase it from 55 to 88%. In addition, budget cuts were to start incidentally.

On 28 February 2017, the six members of the users' committee of the CHSLD Herron resigned as a group, saying they were "unable to fulfill their role in defending the residents' rights in the current climate". At the time, the private establishment could accommodate up to 150 elderly residents who lost their autonomy. The director general at the time, Adrei Stanica told La Presse that his establishment fulfilled the quality of life requirements required by the CIUSS.

On 5 July 2017, the Québec Ombudsman submitted its intervention report to the Herron accommodation centre to the Assemblée Nationale du Québec. The Québec Ombudsman noted gaps in the quality of care and services, including a lack of medical follow-ups, a lack of skills and training of staff, lack of variety in food and a daily limitation on the number of incontinence pants, in addition to communication difficulties and poor access to a neutral and impartial complaints procedure.

On 2 May 2018, the Administrative Labor Tribunal accepted Sylvain Legault's complaint alleging that he was dismissed on 4 February 2016 without just and sufficient cause by Center-Herron, owned by Groupe Katasa inc.

In March 2019, coroner M^{e.} Julie-Kim Godin had tabled an overwhelming report on the residence following the death of a 94-year-old woman, suffocated with food.

=== COVID-19 deaths, facility desertion, government response ===
Between 13 March and 11 April, 31 residents of the facility died; as of 11 April, five were confirmed to be a result of COVID-19. The facility averaged four deaths a month, and had claimed only two deaths during the period. The first known COVID death was in a patient sent to the Jewish General Hospital on 26 March, dying shortly after. Health authorities found that the facility was found to be "deserted" of staff, as of 29 March, three days after the first death.

Le Centre intégré universitaire de santé et de services sociaux (CIUSSS) (Note: CIUSSS: French: centre intégré universitaire de santé et de services sociaux; English: Integrated University Health and Social Services Centre) de l'Ouest-de-l'Île-de-Montréal (Note: English: West Island of Montreal Island; French: Ouest-de-l'Île, Île-de-Montréal) took over the facility. On 10 April, a team of nurses began treating residents. Minister of Health and Social Services Danielle McCann knew of only 18 deaths at the time, two of which were linked to COVID-19. According to the health professionals who intervened in the residence, the living conditions inside were similar to "a concentration camp".

On 11 April, Quebec Premier François Legault promised a criminal investigation into the facility. The Premier said that the province would conduct a larger review of private and public seniors' residences at some point after the COVID pandemic. That day, the Canadian federal government also promised additional measures for long-term care facilities.

The family that owns Groupe Katasa contacted media outlets on 13 April to deny accusations of negligence. While authorities had claimed the company was uncommunicative, the representative claims that they were actively asking CIUSSS for PPE and replacement staff, and that Info-Santé had ordered staff to self-quarantine.

On 16 April, the Montreal Gazette reported that Katasa president Samir Chowieri previously co-owned a company that was investigated for money laundering, by the RCMP Proceeds of Crime unit. Chowieri and his brother had previously served time for their involvement in a drug trafficking conspiracy. No charges were filed in the case. Chowieri was convicted at the Hull courthouse of conspiracy for drug trafficking at the Hull courthouse in 1981, and received two years in prison. A year later, he was sentenced to 18 months in prison for conspiracy to commit fraud. Chowieri had fraudulently acquired 12.5 tonnes of cheese. In 2002, Chowieri was found guilty of tax evasion and fined $125,000, while operating CHO Brothers, a business he has operated since 1995. He was pardoned for this in 2014. In 2006, Chowieri would have acquired a building in Gatineau worth 37 million for the modest sum of $1. The transaction involved an individual who then turned out to be a relative of the Italian-Canadian mafia.

== See also ==
- Integrated Health and Social Services Centre (CISSS; French: Centre Intégré de Santé et de Services Sociaux) (Note: CISSS: French: centre intégré de santé et de services sociaux; English: Integrated Health and Social Services Centre)
- COVID-19 pandemic in Quebec
- COVID-19 pandemic in Montreal

== Citations ==
- ^i^ii^iii^iv^v^vi^vii Division des relations du travail (2018), "Legault et Centre d'hébergement et de soins de longue durée Herron inc.", CM-2016-3220, Tribunal administratif du travail (Quebec), 2018 QCTAT 2165 (CanLII)
