= Regional Power (Canadian company) =

Canadian renewable energy production company

Regional Power, a subsidiary of Manulife Financial, has been developing and operating independent power projects since the mid-1980s. Currently, the firm operates six hydro plants on behalf of other developers with a total generating capacity of 36 megawatts.

== Assets operated for others ==
Regional Power operates the following assets on behalf of other hydro developers:

| Project name | Location | Capacity (MW) | Owner |
|---|---|---|---|
| Dryden | Ontario | 3.9 | Macquarie Power & Infrastructure |
| Hluey Lakes | British Columbia | 3.0 | Macquarie Power & Infrastructure |
| Sechelt | British Columbia | 16.0 | Macquarie Power & Infrastructure |
| Wawatay | Ontario | 13.5 | Macquarie Power & Infrastructure |
| Curtis Dam | New York | | TransCanada |

== Development projects ==
=== Long Lake Generation Station ===
BC Hydro awarded Long Lake Hydro a Power Purchase Agreement in the 2008 Clean Energy Call. This project is a retrofit of a decommissioned storage dam that was built in about 1938 and used to supply power to the nearby Premier mine. The mine, which was last operated by Westmin Resources, closed in the 1990s and has since been decommissioned. The dam was taken out around the time of the mine’s closure.

In the early 2000s, Stuart Croft of Summit Power became interested in this site as a potential retrofit project and established a joint venture with Regional Power. The developers planned to build a new dam and powerhouse in order to supply electricity to Stewart, BC and Hyder, Alaska.

As of May 2010, David Carter, Executive Vice President of Regional Power, estimated that construction would begin in Spring 2011 and the project would be operational in late 2012. Carter claimed that the engineering work was substantially completed, but very little permitting had been done.

Completed in 2014, the project is 17 km north of Stewart, BC. A new rock-filled dam was constructed at the western edge of Long Lake which holds up to 30 million cubic meters of water. A 7 km penstock, leads to the power station where two 15 MW Pelton turbines discharge into the Cascade River. The project is owned by Long Lake Hydro Inc.(LLHI) and the total cost is estimated at 90-million dollars. The expected annual 139GWh of electricity is sold to BC Hydro.
