= Gullrock Lake =

Lake in Kenora District, Ontario, Canada

- Location within Ontario
- Location: Ontario
- Coordinates: 50.9719046°N 93.6233813°W
- Basin countries: Canada

Gullrock Lake is a lake in Kenora District in northwestern Ontario, Canada.

== See also ==
- List of lakes in Ontario
