= Gibson Lake (Pukaskwa National Park) =

- Location in Ontario
- Location: Thunder Bay District & Algoma District, Ontario
- Coordinates: 48°20′23″N 85°19′59″W
- Type: Lake
- Part of: Great Lakes Basin
- Primary outflows: Pukaskwa River
- Basin countries: Canada
- Max. length: 2.2 kilometres (1.4 mi)
- Max. width: 1.2 kilometres (0.7 mi)
- Surface elevation: 464 metres (1,522 ft)

Gibson Lake is a lake in Thunder Bay District and in Charbonneau Township, Algoma District in Northern Ontario, Canada. It is in the Great Lakes Basin, is the source of the Pukaskwa River, and lies entirely within Pukaskwa National Park. There are three unnamed inflows, at the northwest, northeast and southeast. The primary outflow, at the south, is the Pukaskwa River, which flows to Lake Superior.
