= Big Gibson Lake =

- Location in southern Ontario
- Location: Renfrew County, Ontario
- Coordinates: 46°15′36″N 78°10′06″W
- Type: Lake
- Part of: Saint Lawrence River drainage basin
- Primary inflows: Gibson Creek
- Primary outflows: Gibson Creek
- Basin countries: Canada
- Max. length: 2.3 kilometres (1.4 mi)
- Max. width: 0.8 kilometres (0.5 mi)
- Surface elevation: 156 metres (512 ft)

Big Gibson Lake is a lake in the municipality of Head, Clara and Maria, Renfrew County in Eastern Ontario, Canada. It is in the Saint Lawrence River drainage basin. The major inflow, at the south, is Gibson Creek arriving from the direction of Gibson Lake. There are several secondary inflows as well. The major outflow, at the north, is also Gibson Creek, which flows to Holden Lake on the Ottawa River; a secondary outflow at the northwest also flows to Lake Holden. The Ottawa River flows to the Saint Lawrence River.
