= Gong Lake =

- Location within Ontario
- Location: Algoma District, Ontario, Canada
- Coordinates: 47.076°N 83.534°W
- Type: lake

Gong Lake is a lake in Algoma District, Ontario. It is part of the Sayme-Aubinadong-Gong Provincial Park protected area.

== See also ==
- List of lakes in Ontario
