= Little Gibson Lake =

- Location in Ontario
- Location: Cochrane District, Ontario
- Coordinates: 48°27′07″N 80°49′01″W
- Type: Lake
- Basin countries: Canada
- Max. length: 170 metres (560 ft)
- Max. width: 130 metres (430 ft)
- Surface elevation: 296 metres (971 ft)

Gibson Lake is an endorheic lake in geographic Macklem Township, in the city of Timmins, Cochrane District in Northeastern Ontario, Canada.

Gibson Lake is adjacent to the southeast. Gibson Lake Road travels south to the lake from Ontario Highway 101.

== See also ==
- List of lakes in Ontario
