= Pukaskwa River =

- Location of the mouth of the Pukaskwa River in Ontario
- Etymology: From the Ojibwa word "Pukasu"

Location
- Country: Canada
- Province: Ontario
- Region: Northern Ontario
- Districts: Thunder Bay; Algoma

Physical characteristics
- Source: Gibson Lake
  - location: Algoma District
  - coordinates: 48°19′50″N 85°19′43″W
  - elevation: 464 m (1,522 ft)
- Mouth: Lake Superior
  - location: Homer Township
  - coordinates: 48°00′14″N 85°53′33″W
  - elevation: 183 m (600 ft)

Basin features
- River system: Great Lakes Basin
- Tributaries
  - left: East Pukaskwa River
  - right: Fox River

The Pukaskwa River is a river in Thunder Bay District and Algoma District in Northern Ontario, Canada. It is in the Great Lakes Basin and is a tributary of Lake Superior, which it enters at the south end of Pukaskwa National Park. It is a remote, pristine, free-flowing, medium-sized Shield river, with lots of whitewater, best travelled in spring.

A waterfall at Schist Falls, just upstream of the river mouth and with a drop of 24 metres (79 ft), can only be visited by travelling along the river.

The river's name is said to come from the Ojibwa word "Pukasu", which refers to cooking the marrow in the bones of animals. The legend is that a native of the area is said to have killed his wife, burned the bones and thrown them into the river.

The Pukaskwa River was featured in the artwork and films of Bill Mason, including Waterwalker (1984).

== Geography ==
The river begins at Gibson Lake which straddles the border between Algoma District and Thunder Bay District. The river exits the lake in Algoma District, travels southwest into Thunder Bay District and into Jarvey Lake, which also straddles the border. It passes into Algoma District then back into Thunder Bay District before leaving Jarvey Lake at the south west heading in a southwest direction. it briefly turns west, takes in the right tributary Fox River, and heads south. The river resumes a southwest course, enters geographic Homer Township, takes in the left tributary East Pukaskwa River, flows over the Schist Falls, and reaches its mouth at Lake Superior.

From upstream of the East Pukaskwa River confluence to the river mouth, the Pukaskwa River forms the southern boundary of Pukaskwa National Park.

=== Tributaries ===
- Robin Creek (right)
- East Pukaskwa River (left)
- Perry Creek (right)
- Fox River (right)
- Coronation Creek (left)

== Pukaskwa River Provincial Park ==
Pukaskwa River Provincial Park
- IUCN category II (national park)
- Nearest town: White River
- Coordinates: 48°16′30″N 85°23′56″W
- Length: 22 km (14 mi)
- Area: 1,465 ha (5.66 sq mi)
- Designation: Waterway
- Established: 2002
- Governing body: Ontario Parks
- Website: www.ontarioparks.com/park/pukaskwariver

The Pukaskwa River Provincial Park protects a 22 kilometres (14 mi) long section of the Pukaskwa River, including its headwater lakes. The remaining 55 kilometres (34 mi) of the river is protected in the adjacent Pukaskwa National Park. It was established in 2002 and offers a remote whitewater river experience for persons with advanced canoeing and camping skills.

The park features "spectacular scenery" as the Pukaskwa River flows through lakes and small wetlands that are linked by bedrock channels with shallow sandy till rock uplands and sand and gravel deposits.

It is a non-operating park, meaning that there are no services. The only facilities provided are 4 backcountry campsites. Permitted activities include boating, canoeing, fishing, and hunting.

== Canoeing ==
Canoeing the Pukaskwa River is considered to be challenging due to its remoteness and difficulty, and navigable only during spring run-off, from May to early June. Once reaching the river's mouth, paddlers will require a boat shuttle or a lengthy paddle along the undeveloped coast of Lake Superior to reach civilization (either 90 kilometres (56 mi) paddle north to the Park's office at Hattie Cove, or a 90 kilometres (56 mi) paddle east to Michipicoten).

The river has some 57 rapids that can be run in high water, ranging from Class I to IV. One notable whitewater section is the Ringham’s Gorge, a 3-kilometre-long (1.9 mi) whitewater canyon. There are also a few Class V rapids and several waterfalls that need to be portaged.

== See also ==
- List of rivers of Ontario

== Sources ==
- Map 14 (PDF) (Map). 1 : 1,600,000. Official road map of Ontario. Ministry of Transportation of Ontario. 2014.
- Restructured municipalities - Ontario map #2 (Map). Restructuring Maps of Ontario. Ontario Ministry of Municipal Affairs and Housing. 2006.
