= Gibson Lake (Greater Sudbury) =

- Location in Ontario
- Location: Greater Sudbury, Ontario
- Coordinates: 46°52′55″N 80°59′34″W
- Type: Lake
- Part of: Great Lakes Basin
- Primary inflows: Vermilion River
- River sources: Vermilion River
- Basin countries: Canada
- Max. length: 1.0 kilometre (0.6 mi)
- Max. width: 0.5 kilometres (0.3 mi)
- Surface elevation: 339 metres (1,112 ft)

Gibson Lake is a lake in geographic Hutton Township in Greater Sudbury in Northeastern Ontario, Canada. It is in the Great Lakes Basin and is on the Vermilion River, which flows via the Spanish River to Lake Huron. The Canadian National Railway transcontinental main line, used by freight traffic and the Canadian passenger train, travels along the eastern shore of the lake.

== See also ==
- List of lakes in Ontario
