= Gibson Lake (Monestime Township) =

- Location in Ontario
- Location: Algoma District, Ontario
- Coordinates: 46°43′57″N 82°12′05″W
- Type: Lake
- Primary outflows: Unnamed creek
- Basin countries: Canada
- Max. length: 2.0 kilometres (1.2 mi)
- Max. width: 1.4 kilometres (0.9 mi)
- Surface elevation: 479 metres (1,572 ft)

Gibson Lake is a lake mostly in geographic Monestime Township and partly in geographic Olynik Township in Algoma District in Northeastern Ontario, Canada. It is part of the Great Lakes Basin and lies about 4 kilometres (2.5 mi) east of the northern terminus of Ontario Highway 810.

The primary outflow is an unnamed creek at the southwest which eventually flows to the Aux Sables River, which in turn flows via the Spanish River to Lake Huron.

== See also ==
- List of lakes in Ontario
