= Gibson Lake (Cochrane District) =

- Location in Ontario
- Location: Cochrane District, Ontario
- Coordinates: 48°26′56″N 80°48′39″W
- Type: Lake
- Basin countries: Canada
- Max. length: 730 metres (2,400 ft)
- Max. width: 350 metres (1,150 ft)
- Surface elevation: 294 metres (965 ft)

Gibson Lake is an endorheic lake in the geographic townships of Bond, Macklem, Sheraton, and Thomas in Cochrane District in Northeastern Ontario, Canada. Thomas Township and Macklem Township are part of the city of Timmins; Bond Township is part of the municipality of Black River-Matheson; and Sheraton Township is part of Unorganized South West Cochrane District.

Little Gibson Lake is adjacent to the northwest. Gibson Lake Road travels south to the lake from Ontario Highway 101.

== See also ==
- List of lakes in Ontario
