= Gibson Lake (Muskoka District) =

- Location in Ontario
- Location: District Municipality of Muskoka, Ontario
- Coordinates: 44°57′58″N 79°44′57″W
- Type: Lake
- Part of: Great Lakes Basin
- Primary inflows: Gibson River
- Primary outflows: Gibson River
- Basin countries: Canada
- Max. length: 7 kilometres (4.3 mi)
- Max. width: .8 kilometres (0.5 mi)
- Surface elevation: 183 metres (600 ft)

Gibson Lake is a lake in Georgian Bay Township, District Municipality of Muskoka, Ontario, Canada. It is located 45 minutes north of the city of Barrie, and is accessed by Hwy 400 interchange # 174, just north of Six Mile Lake. Gibson Lake borders on the Wahta Mohawk Territory. The lake is 7 kilometres (4.3 mi) long, and flows into Georgian Bay via the Gibson River. The lake comprises two sections with the narrows connecting the North end to the South end. The southern areas of the lake are popular with cottagers from southern Ontario. The first cottagers purchased property here in the 1950s when the land was originally subdivided. There are presently 200 families on the lake with an increasing number of permanent residents. The north-east side of the lake is dominated by the Sahanatien Native Mohawk reserve which has seen much development in recent years. Many of the cottages on the north-east side are built on land leased from Wahta Mohawk families, and accessed by privately maintained roads.

On February 7, 2005 Chief Blaine Commandant of the Wahta Mohawks, the Honourable Andy Scott, Minister of Indian Affairs and Northern Development, and the Honourable Michael Bryant, Ontario Minister Responsible for Native Affairs announced the settlement of a land claim dating back to 1918. The settlement consisted of approximately $9.7 million in financial compensation plus 8,300 acres (3,300 hectares) of provincial Crown land, which Canada has agreed to set aside as reserve land, subject to the terms and conditions of its Additions to Reserves Policy. The lands to be transferred to the First Nation under the settlement are located adjacent to the existing Wahta Mohawk Territory (the Gibson Reserve). All property owners rights of access to their land, along with public roads and public access to nearby lakes, are protected under the settlement. All affected interests were consulted extensively during the negotiation process. The settlement of this claim allowed the continuation of upgrading Highway 400 to 4 lanes, giving cottagers on Gibson Lake easier access to the lake.

Gibson Lake contains a small island where a yearly picnic festival and regatta takes place on the first weekend of August. Prizes and trophies for winners of swimming, canoeing, and tubing competitions are sponsored by the Gibson Lake Cottage Association.

The area contains many different types of flora and fauna, including black bear, deer, moose, fox, raccoon, beaver, martin, chipmunks, swans, hummingbirds, loons, blue herons, ducks, salamanders, and numerous types of freshwater fish. It is also located in a cranberry growing region.

Residents and cottagers have expressed concerns and objections regarding proposed logging in the wetlands and species-at-risk habitat in the Six Mile Lake and Gibson Lake, Township of Georgian Bay, District of Muskoka area.

The Georgian Bay area is habitat for more reptiles than any other place in Canada. Most of these species are at risk. Objectors state that there should be no logging in this area, which is home for the eastern massasauga rattlesnake, eastern hog-nosed snake, fox snake, Blandings turtle, stink pot turtle, all threatened species both provincially and federally and the endangered spotted turtle just to name a few.

== See also ==
- List of lakes in Ontario
