= Gibson Lake (Brimacombe Township) =

Lake in Algoma District, Canada

- Location in Ontario
- Location: Algoma District, Ontario
- Coordinates: 47°31′58″N 84°48′26″W
- Type: Lake
- Primary outflows: Unnamed creek
- Basin countries: Canada
- Max. length: 320 metres (1,050 ft)
- Max. width: 230 metres (750 ft)
- Surface elevation: 288 metres (945 ft)

Gibson Lake is a lake in geographic Brimacombe Township, Algoma District in Northeastern Ontario, Canada. It is part of the Great Lakes Basin and lies adjacent to and east of Ontario Highway 17 in Lake Superior Provincial Park.

The primary outflow is an unnamed creek at the southwest to the Baldhead River, which flows to Lake Superior.

== See also ==
- List of lakes in Ontario
