= Gibson Lake (Frontenac County) =

Lake in Frontenac County, Ontario, Canada

- Location in southern Ontario
- Location: Frontenac County, Ontario
- Coordinates: 44°34′38″N 76°29′22″W
- Type: Lake
- Basin countries: Canada
- Max. length: 265 metres (869 ft)
- Max. width: 90 metres (300 ft)
- Surface elevation: 143 metres (469 ft)

Gibson Lake is an endorheic lake in the municipality of South Frontenac, Frontenac County in Eastern Ontario, Canada. It lies within Frontenac Provincial Park.

== See also ==
- List of lakes in Ontario
