= Gibson Lake (Peel Region) =

- Location in Southern Ontario
- Location: Greater Toronto Area, Ontario
- Coordinates: 43°57′19″N 79°49′31″W
- Type: Lake
- Part of: Endorheic basin
- Basin countries: Canada
- Max. length: 830 metres (2,723.1 ft)
- Max. width: 340 metres (1,115.5 ft)
- Surface elevation: 289 metres (948 ft)

Gibson Lake is an endorheic lake in the community of Palgrave, part of the town of Caledon, Regional Municipality of Peel in the Greater Toronto Area of Ontario, Canada.
