= Gibson Lake (Renfrew County) =

Lake in Eastern Ontario, Canada

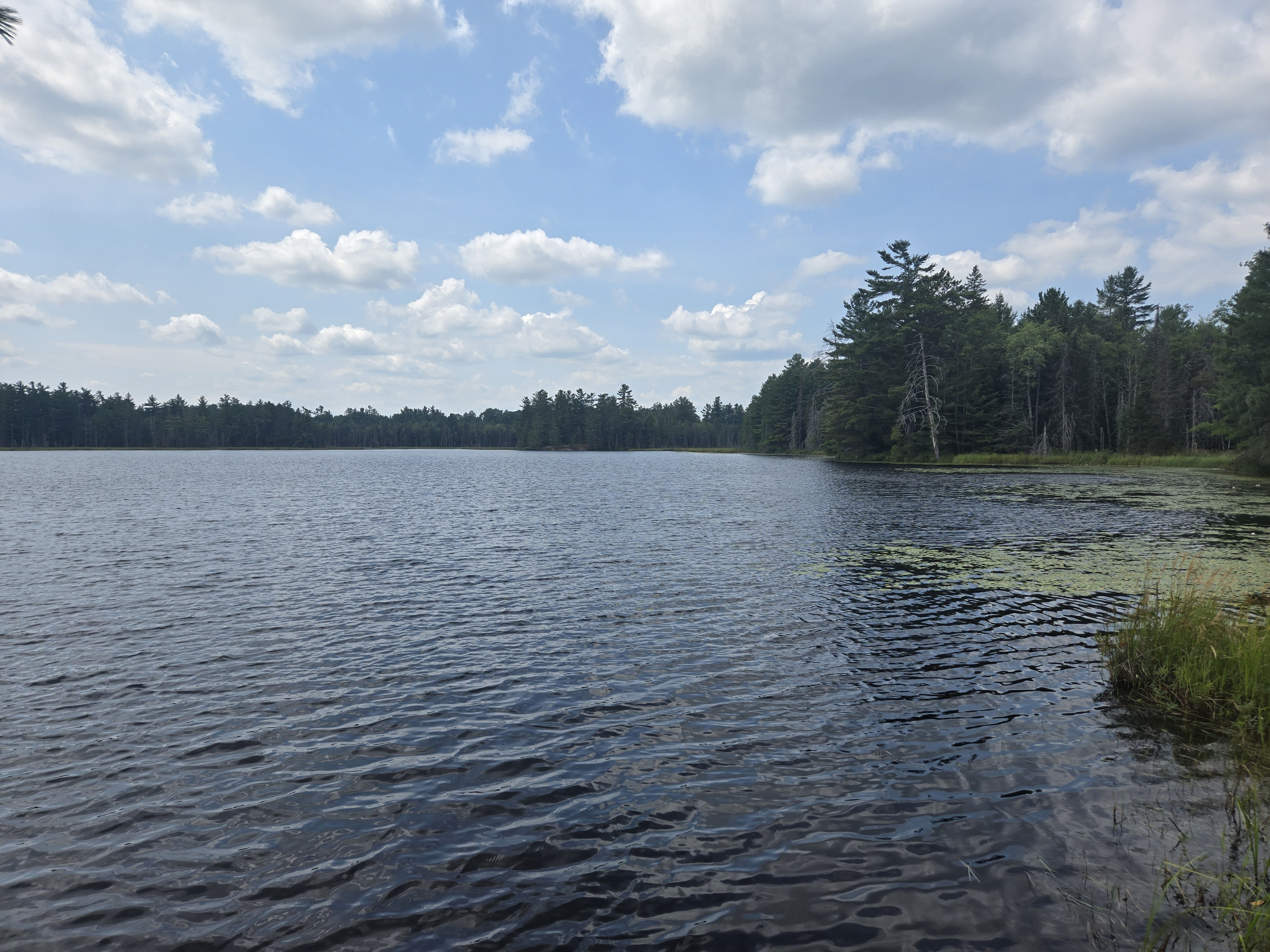
- View of Gibson Lake from the Highway 17 picnic area

- Location in southern Ontario
- Location: Renfrew County, Ontario
- Coordinates: 46°14′40″N 78°10′59″W
- Type: Lake
- Part of: Saint Lawrence River drainage basin
- Primary outflows: Gibson Creek
- Basin countries: Canada
- Max. length: 715 metres (2,346 ft)
- Max. width: 430 metres (1,410 ft)
- Surface elevation: 292 metres (958 ft)

Gibson Lake is a lake in the municipality of Head, Clara and Maria, Renfrew County in Eastern Ontario, Canada. It is in the Saint Lawrence River drainage basin. The major outflow, at the northeast, is Gibson Creek which flows to Big Gibson Lake and then the Ottawa River. The Ottawa River flows to the Saint Lawrence River. Ontario Highway 17 passes on the north side of a lake, from which there is access to a roadside park on the lake.
