= Gibson Lake (Thunder Bay District) =

- Location in Ontario
- Location: Thunder Bay District, Ontario
- Coordinates: 50°24′08″N 89°15′16″W
- Type: Lake
- Part of: James Bay drainage basin
- Primary outflows: Unnamed river
- Basin countries: Canada
- Max. length: 4.1 kilometres (2.5 mi)
- Max. width: 2.1 kilometres (1.3 mi)
- Surface elevation: 364 metres (1,194 ft)

Gibson Lake is a lake in the Unorganized Part of Thunder Bay District in Northwestern Ontario, Canada. It is in the James Bay drainage basin. The lake has one major unnamed inflow, at the south. The outflow, also unnamed, is at the north and leads to Alphonse Bay on Caribou Lake, which in turn flows via the Caribou River, Smoothrock Lake, the Ogoki River and the Albany River to James Bay.
