= Gibson Lake (Nipissing District) =

- Location in southern Ontario
- Location: Nipissing District, Ontario
- Coordinates: 45°52′44″N 78°55′10″W
- Type: Lake
- Part of: Saint Lawrence River drainage basin
- Primary outflows: Gibson Creek
- Basin countries: Canada
- Max. length: 3.4 kilometres (2.1 mi)
- Max. width: 1.0 metre (0.0 mi)
- Surface elevation: 416 metres (1,365 ft)

Gibson Lake is a lake in geographic Biggar Township, Nipissing District in Northeastern Ontario, Canada. It is in the Saint Lawrence River drainage basin and lies within Algonquin Provincial Park. The major outflow, at the southwest, is Gibson Creek which flows to the Nipissing River, and then via the Petawawa River and the Ottawa River to the Saint Lawrence River.

== See also ==
- List of lakes in Ontario
