= Lake Gibson (Florida) =

Lake in Florida, United States

- Location within Florida Location within the United States
- Location: Lakeland, Polk County, Florida
- Coordinates: 28°6′33″N 81°57′38″W
- Basin countries: United States
- Surface area: 483 acres (1.95 km^{2})
- Average depth: 7 ft (2.1 m)
- Max. depth: 20 ft (6.1 m)
- Water volume: 1,027,345,827 US gal (3,150 acre⋅ft; 3.89 hm^{3})

Lake Gibson is a lake in Polk County, Florida, in the United States. It has a surface area of 483 acres (1.95 km^{2}). The lake is a part of the Peace River - Saddle Creek Watershed.

The lake serves a seaplane base with a 7000 feet runway, and FAA code 8FA0.

Several neighborhoods and schools, including Lake Gibson High School, draw their name from the lake.
