= Sienna Senior Living =

Canadian senior housing company

Sienna Senior Living Inc.
- Type: Public
- Traded as: TSX: SIA; S&P/TSX Composite Component
- Industry: Seniors' housing
- Founded: 1972
- Headquarters: Markham, Ontario, Canada
- Key people: Nitin Jain (President and Chief executive officer)
- Website: www.siennaliving.ca

Sienna Senior Living Inc. is a Canadian publicly traded senior housing company based in Markham, Ontario. As at 31 December 2019, the company owned and operated 70 seniors’ living residences in addition to managing 13 residences for third parties; all were located either in Ontario or B.C. In Ontario, Sienna was the largest long-term care operator. The company is listed on the Toronto Stock Exchange.

== History ==
Sienna was founded in 1972. It was originally known as Leisureworld Senior Care Corporation. In March 2005, Macquarie Bank acquired Leisureworld for $528 million. At the time, the company had 19 long-term care homes, 2 retirement homes, and 3,200 beds. 45% of the company was later transferred to the Macquarie Power Income Fund. It held an initial public offering on the Toronto Stock Exchange in 2010, raising $190 million. As part of the IPO, the Macquarie entities sold their stake in the company. For most of its history, the company was primarily an operator of long-term care facilities. After its IPO, it diversified into retirement residences. As part of this diversification, in April 2013, the company purchased Specialty Care, a private senior home operator., for $254 million. In the process, the president of Specialty Care, Lois Cormack, become president of Leisureworld.

In 2015, Leisureworld changed its name to Sienna Senior Living, because of confusion caused by its previous name. As part of the re-branding, which was managed by branding agency Bob's Your Uncle, many of the company's homes also changed their names (e.g. from Leisureworld Caregiving Centre – Oxford to Secord Trails Care Community in Ingersoll). In April 2016, Sienna acquired eight seniors' residences in British Columbia for $255 million. In January 2018, Sienna purchased 10 retirement residences in Ontario for $382 million. In March 2018, Sienna was added to the S&P/TSX Composite Index.

In 2017, the company declared a profit of $21.8-million and in 2019, a profit of $7.5-million.

During the 2020 COVID-19 pandemic in Ontario, the company's long-term care facilities experienced significant numbers of residents who tested positive for the virus and over 290 deaths. In June 2020, Joanne Dykeman, executive VP of operations was dismissed and Lois Cormack, the CEO, resigned, for "personal reasons". The management of three Siena long-term care homes was taken over by the Province of Ontario. The new CEO, Nitin Jain, previously chief financial officer and chief investment officer, said in a statement that the management team would work to "stabilize this company and reposition it for success".

== Properties ==
Sienna operates facilities providing a range of levels of care. Its long-term care facilities provide full nursing care, funded by the Ontario government; all of Sienna's long-term care facilities are located in Ontario. However, residents are required to pay for room and board. On the other hand, Sienna's assisted living and retirement homes are paid for privately by residents, and provide limited or no nursing care.
