= Chartwell Retirement Residences =

Canadian provider of seniors' housing

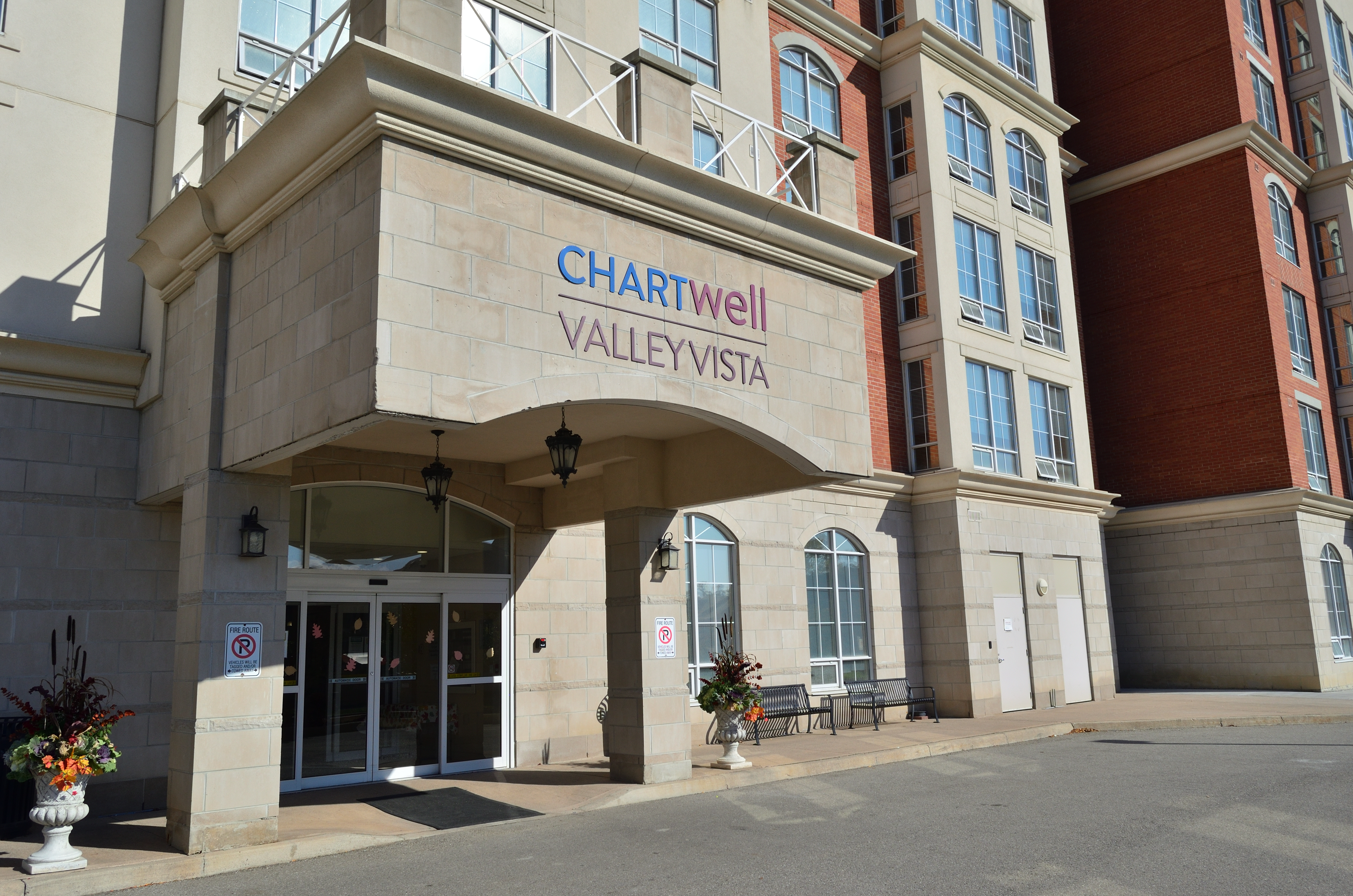
- Chartwell Valley Vista Retirement Residence in Vaughan, Ontario
- Type: Public
- Traded as: TSX: CSH.UN
- Industry: Seniors' housing
- Founded: 2003
- Headquarters: Mississauga, Ontario, Canada
- Number of locations: 160+
- Number of employees: 11,000+
- Website: chartwell.com

Chartwell Retirement Residences is the largest provider of seniors' housing in Canada, serving over 25,000 residents across Quebec, Ontario, Alberta, and British Columbia. Chartwell offers a range of seniors housing communities, from independent living to assisted living.

In 2022, Chartwell's revenues were CA$661 million, with a net income of CA$49.5 million. The market capitalization of Chartwell was CA$1.46 billion and had more than CA$280 million in assets.

== History ==
Chartwell was founded in 1998 through the merger of JBG Management Inc., Alert Care Corporation, and Chartwell Care Corporation – forming a new entity named Chartwell Seniors Housing Real Estate Investment Trust. It was rebranded as Chartwell Retirement Residences in 2012. Chartwell is an unincorporated, open-ended trust that is governed by the laws of Ontario. Chartwell head office is based in Mississauga, Ontario, as well as one corporate office in Montreal, Quebec. Chartwell's portfolio consists of over 160 owned and managed residences. As of the end of December 2020, Chartwell employed over 16,000 staff members across the country. Chartwell is the largest seniors housing provider in Canada.

== Leadership team ==
Chartwell's senior executive committee is made up of four individuals. Vlad Volodarski is the chief executive officer, Karen Sullivan is the president and chief operating officer, Jonathan Boulakia is the chief legal officer, chief investment officer, and Jeffery Brown is the chief financial officer.

From 2009 to 2019, Brent Binions served as president and CEO of Chartwell Retirement Residences. Under his leadership, the company became the largest seniors' housing company in Canada across four provinces. Mr. Binions is a past president of the Ontario Long term Care Association, past vice president of the Ontario Residential Care Association and past vice president for Ontario Retirement Communities Association. He is currently retired, but still sits on Chartwell's board of directors.

Huw J. Thomas is the current chair of the board and has been in this position since May 2022. Thomas is a corporate director. He is the former president and chief executive officer, former Trustee and former Audit Committee Chair of SmartCentres Real Estate Investment Trust. Thomas holds a B.Sc., Economics from the University of London and became a Chartered Accountant in 1984. Thomas is a Fellow of the Chartered Professional Accountants of Ontario.

== The Chartwell Foundation and Corporate giving ==
In 2020, The Chartwell Foundation (Charity #714784931 RR 0001) was established as a national charity to carry on helping seniors continue to live a life of purpose, connectedness, and engagement through wish granting.

In 2015, Chartwell assisted in the creation and became the main sponsor of Wish of a Lifetime Canada, a charitable organization focused on granting wishes to seniors in Canada. Chartwell also continues to grant resident wishes through its Moments that Matter program, part of their recreation team's activity programming in their retirement homes. Wish of a Lifetime Canada ceased its operations in 2020.

In 2010, Chartwell created and published a book entitled Honour to commemorate Canada's Second World War veterans.

== COVID-19 response ==
During the COVID-19 pandemic of 2020–2021, Chartwell was in the "spotlight" as an operator of for-profit care, which had disproportionately high COVID-19 resident deaths compared to not-for-profit or municipal retirement residences in Ontario. It also sparked controversy by paying its shareholders and board members tens of millions in dividends while at the same time receiving tens of millions in emergency funding from the Province of Ontario. The announcement that former Ontario Premier and former Chartwell chairman of the board Mike Harris would be receiving the Order of Ontario consequently sparked controversy.
