= Pukaskwa National Park =

National park in Ontario, Canada

- Parc national Pukaskwa
- IUCN category II (national park)
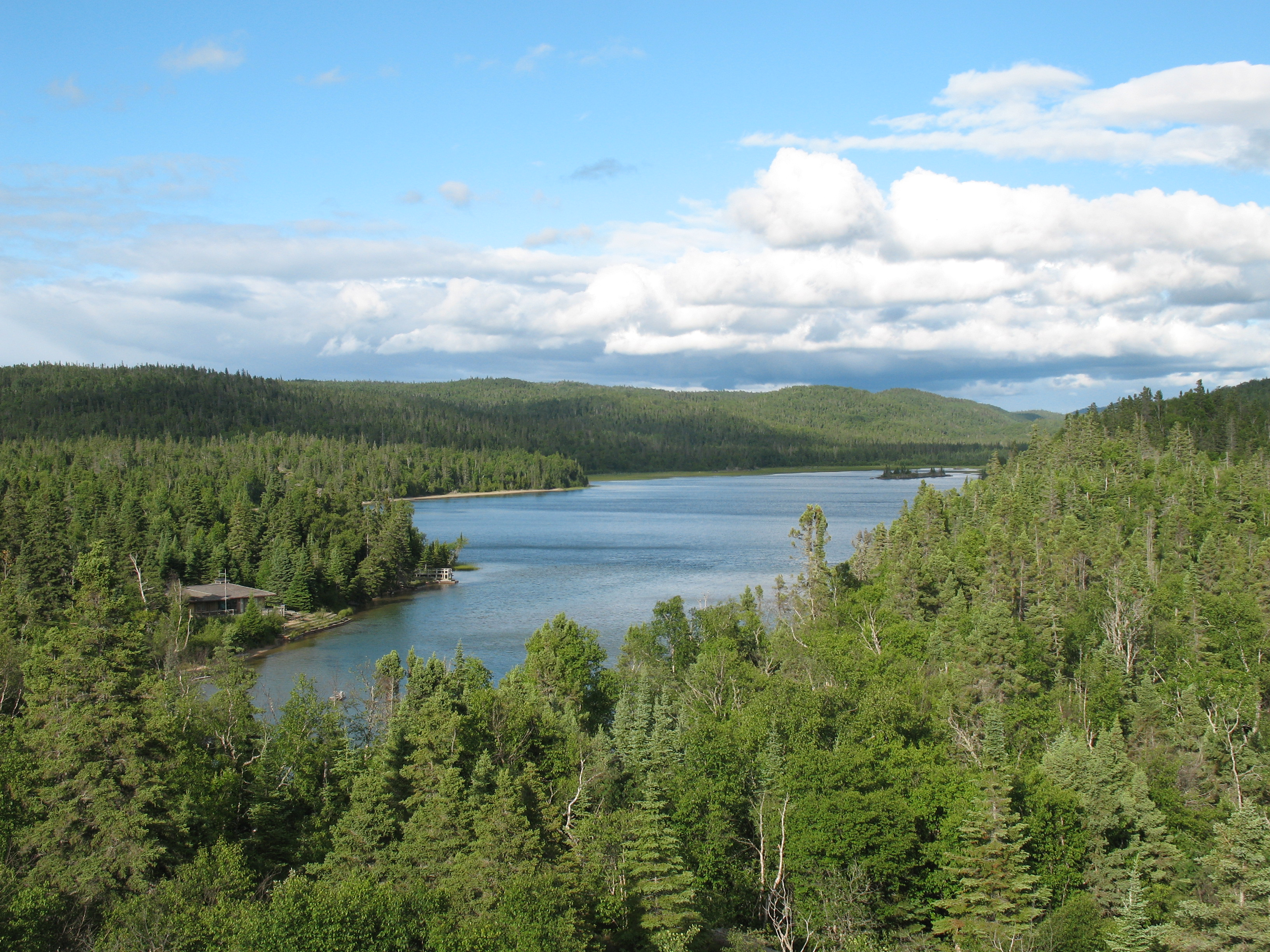
- Southern Headland Trail

- Location within Canada Location within Ontario
- Interactive map of Pukaskwa National Park
- Location: Ontario, Canada
- Nearest city: Marathon
- Coordinates: 48°14′44″N 85°53′18″W
- Area: 1,878 km^{2} (725 sq mi)
- Established: 1978
- Visitors: 17,285 (in 2022–23)
- Governing body: Parks Canada

Pukaskwa National Park (/ˈpʌkəsɔː/ PUK-ə-saw) is a national park located 15 kilometres (9.3 mi) south of the town of Marathon, Ontario in the Thunder Bay District of northern Ontario, Canada. Established in 1978, Pukaskwa is known for its vistas of Lake Superior and boreal forests. The park covers an area of 1,878 square kilometres (725 sq mi), and protects a part of the longest undeveloped shoreline anywhere on the Great Lakes.

The Hattie Cove Campground is located at the north end of the park and can be accessed via Highway 627, the only road access into the park. There are also a number of backcountry campsites located along the 60 km Coastal Hiking Trail which follows the north shore of Lake Superior. The Coastal Hiking Trail has two suspension bridges; one across the White River at Chigaamiwinigum and one across the Willow River. The Coastal Hiking Trail is part of the long-distance Voyageur Hiking Trail. Backcountry campsites are also located along the Coastal Paddling Route, the White River, and the Pukaskwa River. In 2017, the 24 km Mdaabii Miikna ("go to shore trail" in Ojibwe) was opened as a shorter backcountry alternative to the Coastal Hiking trail. It follows the coastline of Lake Superior in the sheltered Picture Rock Harbour.

Puskaskwa is an Indigenous word with a debatable meaning. Its possible meanings include "eaters of fish", "something evil", or "safe harbour". However, the Ojibway and Cree nations maintain "Pukasu" is the correct spelling. "The word "Pukasu" describes what people do when they cook the marrow inside the bones of animals. Remnants of a carcass are thrown into an open fire and left until any remaining meat has all burned away leaving the marrow cooked.

== Flora ==
Pukaskwa National Park is located in the heart of Canada's boreal forest ecozone. Common tree species in this area include black spruce, white spruce, jack pine, trembling aspen, Eastern white cedar, and white birch. Many plants that grow inside Pukaskwa National Park are typically found in Arctic alpine regions, including encrusted saxifrage, birds-eye primrose, and butterwort. Pukaskwa is home to the northernmost populations of Pitcher's thistle in Canada, with four colonies of the plant existing and self-sustaining on the coastal dune areas within the park. Other rare plant species include Franklin's lady-slipper and mountain huckleberry. Many plants within Pukaskwa also have medicinal and ethnobotanical uses. Eastern white cedar, Labrador-tea, and Chaga all grow within Pukaskwa's area and can be boiled into tea for physical and spiritual health. Pukaskwa is also home to numerous lichen and moss species, including sphagnum, reindeer moss, and lungwort species.

== Fauna ==
Black bears, moose, beavers, peregrine falcons, river otters, lynx and Great Lakes wolves are found in this park. The park is also home to bald eagles. There was also a small population of woodland caribou but their numbers declined from 30 caribou in the 1970s to about four in 2012 mainly due to wolf predation. In early 2017, after previous failures to locate any remaining caribou, researchers turned to advanced thermal imaging technology to survey the area for caribou. This survey revealed caribou are now extirpated from this park. Cougars may also be in the park, but numbers are not yet known.

== Climate ==
The park has a humid continental climate (Dfb) under the Köppen climate classification that is strongly influenced by Lake Superior.

Climate data for Pukaskwa National Park (1981−2010)
Month	Jan	Feb	Mar	Apr	May	Jun	Jul	Aug	Sep	Oct	Nov	Dec	Year
Record high °C (°F)	6.0 (42.8)	10.0 (50.0)	17.0 (62.6)	27.0 (80.6)	29.0 (84.2)	30.7 (87.3)	30.5 (86.9)	32.0 (89.6)	25.3 (77.5)	21.0 (69.8)	16.5 (61.7)	9.2 (48.6)	32.0 (89.6)
Mean daily maximum °C (°F)	−7.7 (18.1)	−4.1 (24.6)	0.6 (33.1)	7.2 (45.0)	13.5 (56.3)	17.2 (63.0)	19.5 (67.1)	20.4 (68.7)	15.8 (60.4)	8.8 (47.8)	1.9 (35.4)	−4.2 (24.4)	7.4 (45.3)
Daily mean °C (°F)	−13.5 (7.7)	−10.1 (13.8)	−5.3 (22.5)	1.9 (35.4)	7.8 (46.0)	11.8 (53.2)	14.4 (57.9)	15.6 (60.1)	11.6 (52.9)	5.0 (41.0)	−1.8 (28.8)	−9.1 (15.6)	2.4 (36.3)
Mean daily minimum °C (°F)	−19.2 (−2.6)	−16.1 (3.0)	−11.1 (12.0)	−3.4 (25.9)	2.4 (36.3)	6.3 (43.3)	9.3 (48.7)	10.7 (51.3)	7.3 (45.1)	1.2 (34.2)	−5.5 (22.1)	−13.9 (7.0)	−2.7 (27.1)
Record low °C (°F)	−40 (−40)	−39 (−38)	−35 (−31)	−21 (−6)	−7.5 (18.5)	−4.5 (23.9)	−4.5 (23.9)	−2.0 (28.4)	−7 (19)	−11.5 (11.3)	−28.5 (−19.3)	−39.5 (−39.1)	−40 (−40)
Average precipitation mm (inches)	60.4 (2.38)	32.7 (1.29)	36.7 (1.44)	41.7 (1.64)	72.4 (2.85)	84.5 (3.33)	95.2 (3.75)	75.9 (2.99)	106.0 (4.17)	90.8 (3.57)	80.0 (3.15)	59.8 (2.35)	836.2 (32.92)
Average rainfall mm (inches)	0.64 (0.03)	1.8 (0.07)	10.5 (0.41)	34.3 (1.35)	71.6 (2.82)	84.5 (3.33)	95.2 (3.75)	75.8 (2.98)	105.9 (4.17)	83.5 (3.29)	47.7 (1.88)	5.1 (0.20)	616.5 (24.27)
Average snowfall cm (inches)	59.8 (23.5)	30.9 (12.2)	26.3 (10.4)	7.3 (2.9)	0.88 (0.35)	0.0 (0.0)	0.0 (0.0)	0.09 (0.04)	0.13 (0.05)	7.3 (2.9)	32.3 (12.7)	54.7 (21.5)	219.7 (86.5)
Average precipitation days (≥ 0.2 mm)	14.6	10.9	9.0	8.4	13.3	13.6	15.6	14.3	17.2	17.6	15.6	13.9	164
Average rainy days (≥ 0.2 mm)	0.42	0.58	1.8	7.3	12.9	13.6	15.6	14.2	17.2	16.2	7.6	1.0	108.4
Average snowy days (≥ 0.2 cm)	14.0	9.6	6.8	2.7	0.33	0.0	0.0	0.08	0.07	2.2	9.3	13.4	58.4
Source: Environment Canada

Rivers in the park include the:

- Pukaskwa River
- Cascade River
- North Swallow River
- Swallow River
- White River
- Willow River

The Pic River enters Lake Superior just north of the park.

The highest point in the park is the peak of Tip Top Mountain which rises to 641 meters / 2106 feet.

Thousand year old rock structures known as Pukaskwa Pits which were created by the original inhabitants of this area can be found on many of the park's cobblestone beaches.

The most recent State of the Park Report for Pukaskwa National Park was published in 2008.

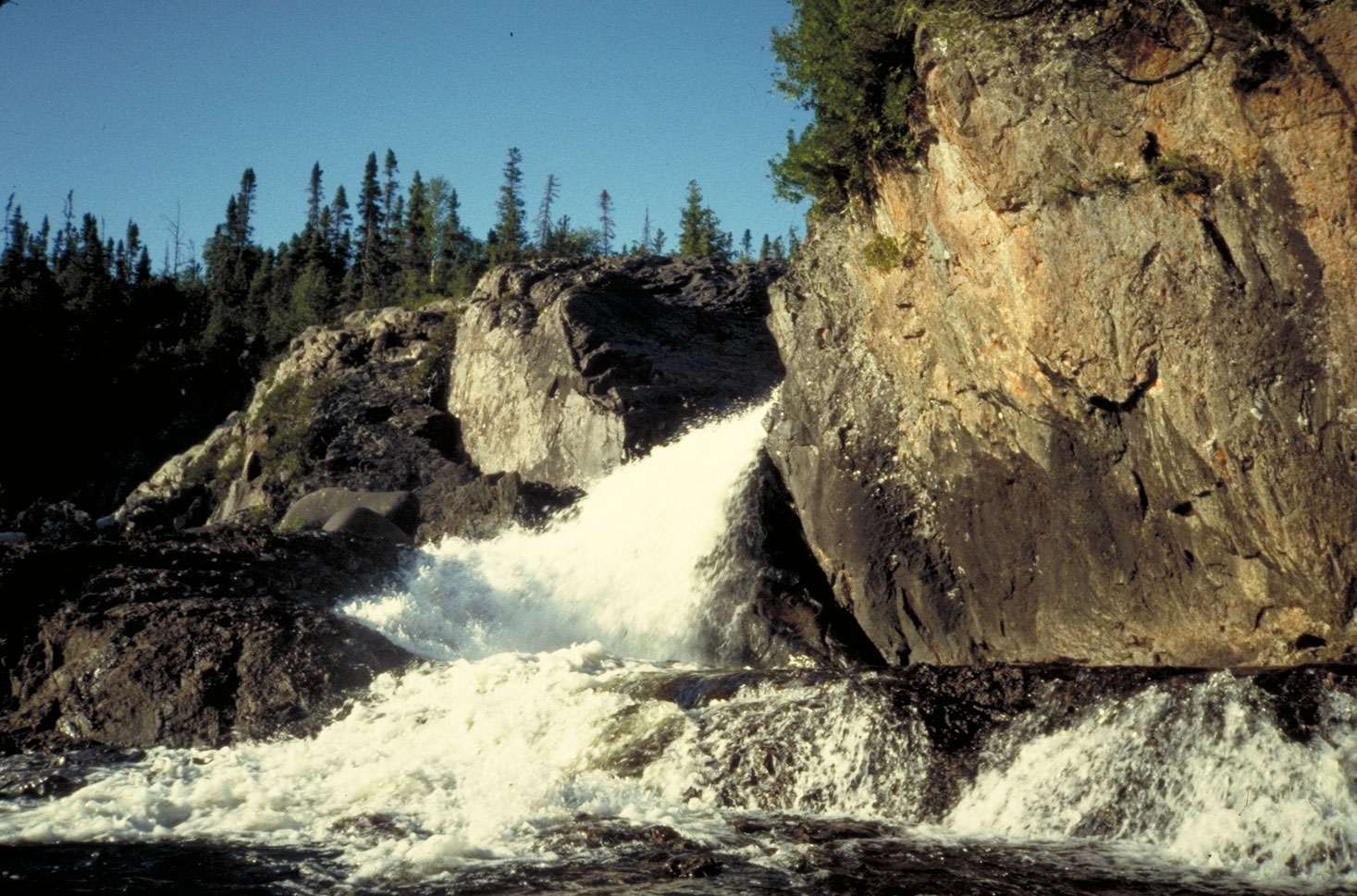
Cascade River Falls

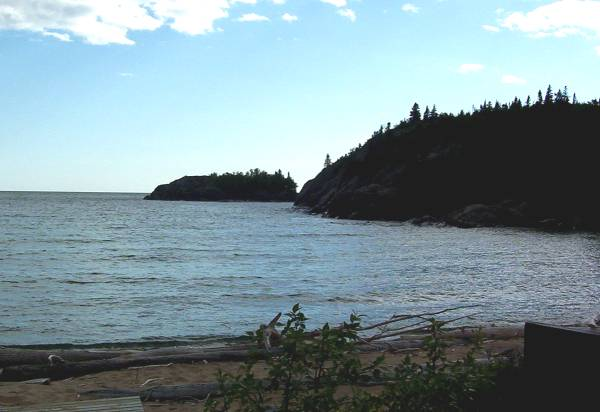
Horseshoe Bay on Lake Superior

== See also ==
- Lake Superior Provincial Park
- National Parks of Canada
- List of National Parks of Canada
