= North Cleaver Lake =

Lake in Thunder Bay District, Ontario, Canada

- Location in Ontario
- Location: Thunder Bay District, Ontario
- Coordinates: 48°59′08″N 87°23′28″W
- Part of: Lake Superior drainage basin
- Primary outflows: Whitesand River
- Basin countries: Canada
- Max. length: 450 m (1,480 ft)
- Max. width: 100 m (330 ft)
- Surface area: 2.69 ha (6.6 acres)
- Surface elevation: 432 m (1,417 ft)

North Cleaver Lake is a lake in the Unorganized Part of Thunder Bay District in Northwestern Ontario, Canada. It is about 450 metres (1,480 ft) long and 100 metres (330 ft) wide, has an area of 2.69 hectares (6.6 acres), and lies at an elevation of 432 metres (1,417 ft). The lake is in the Lake Superior drainage basin, and is located about 21.5 kilometres (13.4 mi) northwest of the community of Schreiber, and 2 kilometres (1.2 mi) northwest of Cleaver Lake, a lake in the adjacent Hewitson River drainage basin.

The lake has no inflows. The primary outflow is an unnamed creek at the west which leads west to the 550-metre (1,800 ft) distant Winston Lake. Winston Lake drains via Winston Creek and the Pays Plat River to Lake Superior.
