= Disappearance of Christina Calayca =

Disappeared woman from Ontario, Canada

Christina Calayca
- Born: 19 December 1986
- Disappeared: 6 August 2007 (aged 20); Rainbow Falls Provincial Park, Ontario, Canada
- Status: Missing for 19 years, 3 months and 15 days
- Parents: Mario Calayca (father); Elizabeth Rutledge (mother)

Christina Calayca (born 19 December 1986) was a young Filipino-Canadian woman who disappeared from Rainbow Falls Provincial Park, Ontario in 2007. Her whereabouts and the circumstances surrounding her disappearance remain unknown.

== Background ==
Christina Calayca was born on 19 December 1986 to parents Elizabeth Rutledge and Mario Calayca, who divorced when she was 1 year old. A Filipino Canadian, Calayca's mother had immigrated to Canada in 1980 from Mindanao in the Philippines. Calayca had never been to the Philippines, though her mother planned to someday travel there with her. She had one sibling: a younger brother, Michael Rutledge, who was 15 years old at the time of her disappearance. Calayca was raised as a devout Catholic, and according to her mother had begun praying at the age of one. In the summer of 2007, Calayca was living in the Cabbagetown neighbourhood of Toronto and working nine-hour days at a summer camp hosted by St. Bernadette’s Day Care, adjacent to D’Arcy McGee Catholic School. Prior to her disappearance, Calayca attended George Brown College and graduated with a certificate in Early Childhood Education in 2006. Calayca was passing along half her salary to her mother, allowing Rutledge to drop several side jobs to focus on her career as a self-employed financial advisor. Investigators believe Calayca was not in a romantic relationship in August 2007.

Statements from her family have described Calayca as hard-working and a natural leader, with ambitions of performing missionary work in the Philippines and going on a family vacation to Panama before attending teachers' college at York University. Calayca held a leadership position in a church-affiliated youth group, Youth for Christ, and was responsible for organizing one of its largest conferences. She had also contributed a significant number of volunteer hours to an affiliated youth ministry. Calayca has also been noted as having very poor spatial awareness, sense of direction, and sense of balance. Prior to her disappearance, she had been part of a hiking group which became lost on the Seaton Hiking Trail near Oshawa and only emerged from the bush after wandering aimlessly for some time. Family members have noted that Calayca also had a number of phobias, including a fear of spiders and rodents, but had experience fasting and was not a picky eater, traits that her mother believed would allow her to survive in the wilderness. She had also suffered an inflamed callus years prior when she stepped on a needle by accident and did not have it removed immediately, allowing it to become embedded in her foot and leave a lasting injury which made running or standing for long periods of time painful. As a result of her injury, Calayca generally kept in shape by playing volleyball and would only occasionally try jogging.

At the time of her disappearance, Calayca weighed 125-130 lbs, and stood 5'2" (157 cm) tall. She had brown eyes and wavy, shoulder-length black hair with orange streaks in her bangs. Her skin tone has been described as having a dark East Asian complexion, and investigators noted that she was in good health but poor physical condition at the time she went missing.

== Disappearance ==
=== Preparations ===
Prior to the 2007 Civic Holiday, Christina Calayca had intended to participate in a youth conference taking place in Montreal, but found the cost of the trip would be too expensive. Rather than attend the conference, Calayca and three friends ― her cousin, Faith Castulo (age 20); and two friends from Youth for Christ, Edward "Eddy" Migue (age 20) and Joe "J.B." Benedict (age 19) ― made plans to camp at Rainbow Falls Provincial Park in Northwestern Ontario over the long weekend.

The provincial park covers an area of about 575 hectares and is located on Highway 17 between the towns of Schreiber and Rossport. Two camping areas exist within the park: the main Whitesand Lake campground, located less than a kilometre from the park gates; and the Rossport campground, located three kilometres to the west along the Trans-Canada Highway. Every campsite comes equipped with a metal-grilled fire pit but all other amenities, including showers, are provided at a central comfort station. Most of the hiking trails in the area are short, generally measuring around 3 km, with the exception of the 53-kilometre Casque Isles Trail which passes through the park and stretches from Rossport to Terrace Bay. The park has been described by investigators as "one of the most rugged" areas in the province, as outside of its established hiking trails the area is covered in thick bush and cliffs up to 240 metres high.

None of the four participants in the trip were experienced campers and none had ever been as far north as Thunder Bay. While they had put enough planning into the trip for Calayca to let work colleagues know where she was going, she did not tell her mother their exact destination. The decision on where to spend their long weekend was made by typing the keyword 'falls' into an online search engine and selecting the third result.

=== Sunday, 5 August ===
Locations
1 Lot 88, Whitesand Lake Campground, Rainbow Falls Provincial Park.

At around noon on Sunday, 5 August 2007, Calayca and the rest of her group arrived at Rainbow Falls Provincial Park after driving about 14 to 15 hours from Toronto in a green Honda CR-V which belonged to Calayca's mother. The group had left Toronto the day before at around 10:00 in the morning, stopping in Sault Ste. Marie, Neys Provincial Park, and Schreiber along the way. They had also been delayed by running out of fuel outside Wawa. Although they had reserved campsite lot 72 in the Whitesand Lake campground, the group relocated to lot 88 as it was positioned in a more private area along the lake than lot 72, which was on the main road running through the campground. The park was busy, with about three-quarters of its 97 campsites occupied by visitors, most of whom were locals from nearby communities.

Calayca and her friends spent the rest of the afternoon setting up and relaxing at the campsite before laying down to nap for half an hour around 18:30. The alarm which was supposed to wake the group failed to do so, and they remained sleeping until about 22:30. After waking they lit a campfire and spent the next several hours crowded around and grilling over it. The group finished almost all of their food and consumed several alcoholic beverages, though according to Migue none of them drank enough to become intoxicated. The last known photograph of Calayca was taken just after midnight, at 00:08 on Monday, 6 August; the photo features her, Migue, and Benedict tending to a frying pan over the fire, and was taken by Castulo. The group finally doused the flame at around 03:30 and went to bed around 04:00, at which time Calayca joked that the group should go swimming before noting that it was too dark to do so.

=== Monday, 6 August ===
At around 06:30, eight minutes before dawn, Calayca asked Migue to accompany her to the comfort station, and according to Migue he and Calayca decided to go jogging on their return trip. Accounts differ as to whether or not the pair decided to take different paths immediately or if they had tried to run together until Calayca, unable to keep up with Migue, instead decided to take an alternative route. The two split up at an intersection near the park entrance and just south of the comfort station, with Migue following the road towards Highway 17 and Calayca opting for a different road which led to the Rainbow Falls, the cascading waterfalls which lend their name to the provincial park. This is the last confirmed sighting of Calayca.

When last seen by Migue, Calayca was wearing a striped maroon and purple shirt (alternatively described as long-sleeved or a t-shirt), a blue hoodie, size-36 black pants, and white running shoes. Earlier photos of Calayca indicate she had also brought a yellow 'Lucky in Love' t-shirt, grey hoodie, and large sunglasses on the trip. Migue later recounted that Calayca's mood at the time appeared upbeat, which was considered normal for her.

Schreiber resident Paul Gauthier later told police that he may have seen Calayca the morning she disappeared. According to Gauthier, he had been camping at the Rossport section of the campgrounds roughly 3 km from the lot where she and her friends had stayed the night. Gauthier was drinking coffee outside his RV at around 09:00 when he spotted an unidentified Asian woman run off the highway and through the campground. Police questioned Gauthier multiple times about the sighting, but to date have not confirmed if the person he saw was Calayca.

== Investigation ==
=== Initial search, 6–10 August ===
After splitting up with Christina Calayca, Edward Migue followed the road toward Highway 17 with the intention of reaching the Rossport campground. He only got as far as a roadside picnic area where he carved "FCJE", the first initials of all four members of their group, into a rock before turning back. About an hour after he and Calayca set out jogging, Migue returned to the campsite and began searching for an axe to whittle down some oversized logs, but was unable to find one. Joe Benedict and Faith Castulo woke around 09:30. At first the group was not concerned that Calayca had yet to rejoin them, and Castulo suggested her cousin was likely taking a walk through the forest to clear her mind. As they waited for her to return, Benedict showered at the comfort station and stopped by one of the park beaches to check for Calayca, while Castulo and Migue prepared breakfast.

When Calayca had still not returned by 11:00, her friends began looking for her. Benedict and Migue drove along the road to the falls and then searched the Lake Superior Trail and Rainbow Falls Trail, two divergent forest trails she may have jogged down. Although a number of other people were present on the trails, the two men did not ask them for help. Around 13:45 the group left a note for Calayca at the campground in case she returned while they were out searching, and intended to drive to Rossport where one of the hiking trails ends. While inquiring about trail maps at the park gatehouse, they informed park staff that Calayca was missing. After advising the group to report the situation to the Ontario Provincial Police, park personnel began making phone calls as well as searching local trails and beaches for Calayca. Her friends officially reported her missing around 14:00, seven and a half hours after she was last sighted, and her mother, Elizabeth Rutledge, was informed of the situation around 16:00.

Under the command of OPP Sgt. Eric Luoto, the OPP Northwest Region Emergency Response Team took responsibility for the first search for Calayca, establishing a command post in the park near Whitesand Lake. The search would last a total of 17 days, one of the longest in the region's history; and see the deployment of about 100 police officers, fire fighters, divers, and specialists unaffiliated with the police, though for the first four days only about 30 of these personnel were involved. Searchers used GPS, underwater side-scanning radar, infrared cameras, and four canine units in the search, as well as two fixed-wing airplanes, a floatplane, three helicopters, and marine vehicles. Pilots from the Civil Air Search and Rescue Association (CASARA) also participated in the first two weeks of the search, sending at least one aircraft each day to help look for signs of Calayca. For the duration of this search, most statements to the media were delivered by OPP regional spokesperson Sgt. Deb Tully.

The weather at Rainbow Falls on 6 August was favourable, ranging between a low of 15 °C and high of 23°, and the fog which usually covers Lake Superior had cleared. Conditions briefly worsened on Tuesday, 7 August, when a hard rainstorm hit the area, but temperatures rose again and the area experienced an unseasonably warm few weeks while the search was ongoing. The rain did have a lasting side effect on the search, causing a significant amount of leaves to fall from the canopy and cover the ground. The difficult terrain was a serious challenge for searchers, resulting in three injuries: a dog handler who experienced a sprained ankle, another handler with a twisted knee, and a rescue worker who suffered facial lacerations while attempting to rappel down a cliff. A search dog was also lost in the forest during the search. For safety reasons, no searches were performed at night.

Canine units were deployed early on in the search, but by the time they arrived on the scene nearly a full day had passed since Calayca had last been spotted and they were unable to pick up her scent. The OPP sent investigators to survey the Rainbow Falls Trail and Casque Isles Trail, splitting officers into teams of three to search the main path of each trail as well as the area just off the path on either side. Acting on the assumption that Calayca was alive but lost, they covered the entirety of the 53-kilometre Casque Isles Trail over the course of several days, frequently calling out her name.

The OPP also deployed "hasty teams" to search the area around where Calayca was last spotted, concentrating their efforts along natural and anthropogenic corridors off the trail, such as rivers or electrical lines, which a person may follow when lost. Investigators determined their search area based on a standard lost hiker behavioural profile, using a statistical method to determine that she would likely be found inside an 8-kilometre radius from the place where she was last seen, as is the case in about 90% of situations where people go missing in woodlands. This tactic was undermined by the difficult terrain in the area, the possible sighting in Rossport, and a flawed understanding of Calayca's behavioural profile.

While some items of interest were recovered during these searches, none have been officially linked to Calayca. One team which searched around the Rainbow Falls recovered a pair of socks from a deep pool of water in the Hewitson River (sometimes called "Whitesand River") at the base of the falls, as well as a footprint in a mossy area nearby. According to investigators, the socks were likely too large to fit Calayca and attempts to test them for DNA have been inconclusive. While the footprint matched Calayca's shoe size, without a preserved tread pattern it was impossible to determine if it was created by one of her running shoes. Nonetheless, a Thunder Bay identification officer was brought in on the investigation to create a plaster cast of the print for further forensic study. Another unit located a site where a broken branch and candy wrapper suggested a person had rested, but DNA recovered from the wrapper was tested at the Molecular World laboratory in Thunder Bay and was found to not match Calayca's genetic profile.

Air units began using thermal imagery to look for Calayca on the fourth day of the search, while aircraft without infrared equipment engaged in hour-long flights outside the area being searched by the hasty teams on the ground. From the air, searchers noted some areas with heightened activity in scavenging birds, including turkey vultures and crows, as well as one site with a lean-to. Ground searches of these locations turned up no signs of Calayca.

Some police resources involved in the search were diverted after the body of a Sault Ste. Marie man was found in a tent south of Wawa on Friday, 10 August but by Monday, 12 August the number of officers involved in the search had increased to about 70. Officers were again diverted to another missing person investigation near Nipigon on Wednesday, 15 August, but this was soon determined to be a false alarm.

Missing person posters were distributed in nearby communities, including Schreiber, in the first few days of the search.

=== Volunteer and marine search, 11–23 August ===
Although asked not to participate in the search themselves, Calayca's family camped out around nearby Thunder Bay for the duration of the search effort, with Elizabeth Rutledge arriving the day after her daughter was reported missing. OPP Constable Keith Jones met the family when they arrived in the area and put them in touch with Raul Escarpe, a Catholic priest and fellow Filipino Canadian who performed special masses for the family several times during the search. As media interest in the situation grew, OPP spokespeople denied that public scrutiny played any role in keeping the search active.

Mike King, the Mayor of Terrace Bay; and Pat Halonen, a town councillor in Schreiber, organized a volunteer search team which scoured the area the weekend after Calayca went missing. About 100 to 200 residents from local communities, including Schreiber's former mayor Don McArthur, participated in a grid search organized by Tracy Anderson, the fire chief in Terrace Bay. According to Halonen, the volunteer force also included a "good mixture" of experienced searchers. The first search on Saturday, 11 August lasted for eight hours and covered the area between the provincial park's East Beach and Highway 17, starting at the Hewitson River and heading east towards Schreiber. Another day of searching followed on Sunday, 12 August, this time involving 50 to 80 volunteers; members of Calayca's family, who had been previously barred from participating in the investigation; and Calayca's friends, Joe Benedict and Edward Migue. Volunteers returned to the park again on Monday, 13 August to continue looking for Calayca, though in reduced numbers as many had to return to work.

The OPP's underwater search unit used sonar to investigate local bodies of water, including a deep pool of water at the base of the Rainbow Falls where evidence was recovered which has never been conclusively linked to Calayca. As part of their search, marine searchers engaged in the process of sledding, whereby two divers in a sled-like watercraft were pulled across the water by an OPP boat, allowing them to look directly down into clear sections of Whitesand Lake.

Amid frustration with the lack of results, Calayca's father, Mario Calayca, first addressed the media on 13 August and announced he would bring seven other relatives to the search area to support the investigation, though he and four relatives left the area to return to Toronto after surveilling the area from a police helicopter on 16 August. Calayca's family gradually became less confident that she would be found, though even on 17 August, eleven days into the search, OPP Regional Commander Mike Armstrong continued to reassure them and the media that her chances of survival were high as favourable conditions in the park made dehydration and hypothermia unlikely. On Wednesday, 22 August, Calayca's uncle Ken West told journalists:

They’ve used K-9 units. They’ve used planes. They’ve used submarines. They’ve used all sorts of different ways in order to find Christina. And nothing, absolutely nothing works. There’s no clue at all.

Police initiated a final concentrated grid search to find Calayca on Tuesday, 21 August, now telling media they believed Calayca was a "non-responsive person" and would not be able to reply if she heard searchers calling her name. By this point most other police resources, including aircraft and canine units, had been called off the search, leaving only 20 to 25 officers to perform the grid search and divers to continue investigating nearby bodies of water. On the advice of OPP Sgt. Don Webster, the Provincial Search & Rescue Coordinator, the search for Calayca was called off on Thursday, 23 August. The day after the search for Calayca was called off, Rutledge told journalists that she would continue to search for her daughter herself. At the time, the family believed Calayca had been abducted and was no longer in Rainbow Falls Provincial Park.

After the initial police search was called off, the investigation into Christina Calayca's disappearance stalled. Later attempts by investigators to canvass the area failed to turn up any evidence which could explain her disappearance. Investigators questioned Joe Benedict, Faith Castulo, and Edward Migue three times after the initial search, but these interrogations did not produce any new information. None of Calayca's friends who accompanied her to Rainbow Falls Provincial Park have ever been considered suspects in her disappearance. In the months after she went missing, police told Calayca's family that they were following up on 60 leads related to her case, including interviews with other campers who left the park the weekend of the disappearance.

=== Public response ===
Calayca's family held a vigil which was attended by over 600 people at the Prince of Peace Catholic Church in Scarborough on 15 August, and another at the Rainbow Falls on 8 September. Her employer, St. Bernadette’s Day Care, also hosted a vigil for her on 15 August. A mass in her honour was held at Darcy McGee Catholic School to commemorate the one-year anniversary of her disappearance on 6 August 2008.

Calayca's mother set up a website and Facebook group led by her aunt, Karen Caguicla, to raise awareness about the case in January 2008. The family also participated in a number of unofficial searches, the first of which occurred on 7 September 2007.

In March 2009, A Day Goes By: A Tribute to Christina was released as a collaboration between musical artists in Toronto's Filipino community, with proceeds of the 12-track album going towards funding another search of Rainbow Falls.

=== Private searches ===
Calayca's mother, Elizabeth Rutledge, financed multiple private searches of the area around Rainbow Falls Provincial Park by fundraising through the Find Christina Calayca Group and withdrawing money from her daughter's trust fund. The first fundraiser organized by the family occurred on 10 December 2007 and solicited donations through the sale of a CD entitled Missing You. On 28 May 2008, with a new search planned for the next month, the family organized a silent auction to raise additional funds. Another fundraiser occurred on 10 August 2008.

The first privately-funded search, a collaborative effort with the OPP, cost Rutledge $44,000 of the $48,000 the family had fundraised to that point and involved 22 volunteer searchers working over five days. OPP Sgt. Eric Luoto again led the police search effort, hoping to take advantage of areas which were too thick with vegetation to properly search in summer 2007 but had been thinned out over the winter. A team of five rescue workers trained in rappelling was also deployed to look for evidence around the area's cliffs; they had originally been scheduled to search the area on 19 November 2007 but were unable to work in poor weather conditions. After police concluded their search, the family and volunteer force were allowed to conduct their own search led by Halifax-based canine handler Doug Teeft, who provided his team of cadaver dogs for the expedition. The Ottawa-based canine group the Ottawa Valley Search and Rescue Dog Association (OVSARDA) and eight US-based search dog teams also participated in the search. This phase of the search was organized with help from the Minnesota-based John Francis Foundation and began on 13 June 2008. The volunteer force called police to report strange behaviour from the search dogs in a particular area, and while this behaviour did not suggest human remains had been found it was only observed in the vicinity of a large hole. Forensic technicians with the OPP investigated the hole and the area around in on Wednesday, 18 June but found no evidence to explain the dogs' behaviour or to link the site to Calayca's disappearance.

On 30 October 2008, the Bring Christina Home Fundraising Gala was put on in Richmond Hill to raise awareness for Calayca's case. The event was hosted by news anchor Francis D'Souza and featured professional boxer George Chuvalo and missing person advocate David Francis as speakers. The event also featured singer Stephanie Martin and Canadian Idol contestant Andrew Austin as its musical acts. To promote the event, the Find Christina Calayca Group was interviewed by journalist Charles "Spider" Jones for his CFRB 1010 radio show on 5 October.

A second privately-funded search took place in November 2008 and involved a team of six cadaver dogs which were brought to investigate the area where Calayca was last spotted. According to search manager Jeff Hasse, all six dogs detected the scent of human remains at the bottom of the Hewitson River, but the flow and depth of the river made any further investigation into this lead difficult.

By March 2009, much of the family and community support for Rutledge's search efforts had faded. Sales of the A Day Goes By: A Tribute to Christina CD only generated $610 of the $20,000 figure that a third expedition was estimated to cost. In a March 2009 interview with reporters from the Toronto Star, Rutledge admitted that she was prepared to give up the search after twenty months without results, partly owing to an incident in November 2008 where she and several family members nearly collided with a moose on Highway 17 while searching for her daughter.

A third and final search funded by the family began on 19 September 2009 in what searchers called "perfect conditions". The search was again led by Jeff Hasse and intended to focus on the area along the Hewitson River where search dogs had detected the possible presence of remains in November 2008. In addition to family members, 21 volunteers with the Search, Rescue, and Recovery Resources of Minnesota (SRRRMN) participated in the search. Searchers were split into eight units and sent to investigate places of interest, including some areas surveyed the day before the main search began. Although searchers claimed to have found more possible evidence, an OPP search on 14 October 2009 was unable to find any new leads. By this time Rutledge sold her house and moved into a two-bedroom apartment with her son to finance the investigation, but when her third privately-funded search failed to turn up any new evidence she told journalists she was faced with the choice of using what money she had to left to either continue funding the investigation or pay for her son's university education. No privately-funded searches have taken place since 2009.

=== Later years ===
Human remains discovered in the Thunder Bay area in October 2010 were investigated as possibly belonging to Calayca, but were later determined to be unrelated.

In a 2021 interview, retired OPP officer Sgt. Don Webster told the Elliot Lake Today online publication that over the course of the investigation he had assembled a large binder detailing all the available information about Calayca's case, and had met with the family to discuss the investigation. Webster revealed that some information about the case has not been made public as it is part of an active investigation.

=== Current status ===
Christina Calayca's disappearance is still under investigation by the Nipigon division of the Ontario Provincial Police, and as of 2022 is still being treated as a missing person case. The government of Ontario has issued a $50,000 reward for information leading to her whereabouts.

== Theories ==
Christina Calayca's current whereabouts remains unknown, as do the circumstances surrounding her disappearance on 6 August 2007.

During the initial search, some investigators speculated that Calayca had been attacked by a bear. A consultant from the Ministry of Northern Development, Mines, Natural Resources and Forestry was brought in to help investigate this theory, but Stephen Herrero of the University of Calgary later cast doubt on this theory. Herrero, who authored an authoritative book on bear attacks, suggested that it was "not impossible, but highly unlikely" that a bear had attacked Calayca as no ripped clothing, blood, or drag marks were found during the initial search, and a bear would not have travelled any further than 600 ft with a kill. It is not believed that the area's wild wolves would have attacked Calayca as wolf attacks are extremely rare.

One explanation suggests that Calayca was the victim of misadventure. OPP investigators have alleged that Calayca's lack of experience hiking in the wilderness likely led to her becoming lost and disoriented in the dense undergrowth of the forest. However, Calayca's mother has questioned why her daughter would have wandered off the forest's well-marked trails given her inexperience, and how she could have managed to remain undetected for the two and a half weeks that police spent searching the area for her. Investigators also allege that they found no signs of the kind of disturbance usually found after a person creates a path through dense vegetation. Prior to Calayca, only one other person had gone missing while hiking the park's trails and had been located within nine hours. While investigating Calayca's disappearance, OPP Sgt. Eric Luoto claimed search and rescue teams in Northwestern Ontario are called in to locate 30 to 40 lost people each year, and in more than 95% of cases are able to find the person within 24 hours. A number of outliers had occurred in recent years, however: on 16 May 2006, over a year before Calayca disappeared, Hamilton-based tree planter Aju Iroaga went missing in an area about 70 km north of White River, Ontario; his case also remains unsolved, but like Calayca early speculation suggested he may have been attacked by an animal. Before this, the 4 July 2005 disappearance of Jeffrey Turtle on the Pikangikum First Nation had also triggered a 17-day search by the OPP which failed to locate Turtle or determine why he had disappeared.

Calayca's family has suggested it is unlikely that she intentionally disappeared in order to sever ties with her community and family. Calayca was reported to have a strong relationship with her family, and had been responsible for organizing her mother's 50th birthday party on 28 July 2007, just nine days before her disappearance. It has been noted on the podcast The True Crime Files that such a plot would have involved at least one other person who would have to not come forward in the years since the disappearance in order for the case to remain unsolved. Rumours that allege Calayca was due to enter into an arranged marriage and was unhappy as a result of this and limited career options are not backed by any testimony offered by investigators, the family, or others close to her in life.

=== Foul play ===
Foul play has been suggested as a possible cause of Calayca's disappearance. As recently as 2018, Rutledge and others in Calayca's family have stated that they believe she was abducted or murdered, noting that the Trans-Canada Highway would give an attacker easy access to the area and her trusting nature may have left her vulnerable to an opportunistic killer. Karen Caguicla, Calayca's aunt and the head of the Find Christina Calayca Group, defended the family's stance that her niece had been the victim of violence by telling journalists "Christina is just too smart to get lost". Traffic through the area was higher than usual but standard for a long weekend, owing to campers celebrating the Civic Holiday and travelling to attend local events, including the annual Dragfest which generally attracts a crowd of 10,000 attendees.

In spite of suggestions that they had something to do with her going missing, the three friends that accompanied Calayca to Rainbow Falls are not considered suspects according to investigators or Calayca's family. Edward Migue, the last confirmed person to have seen Calayca, has since expressed regret for allowing her to walk alone on the morning she disappeared.

Most visitors to Rainbow Falls Provincial Park come from communities near the park, and travellers coming from as far away as Toronto are rare. Don McArthur, a former Mayor of Schreiber, has stated he does not believe a resident of the local communities would have assaulted Calayca. According to McArthur, the only murder he knew to have occurred in Schreiber happened in 2005 and was likely related to the illegal drug trade.

On the CBC true crime podcast The Next Call, host David Ridgen speculated that Denis Léveillé, a suspect in the unsolved 1996 disappearance of Melanie Ethier with a history of sexually abusing teenage girls, may have been responsible for other missing person cases in Ontario. Ridgen included Calayca in a list of girls and young women who disappeared in Ontario at the time Léveillé was active.

A theory proposed by the hosts of the podcast Cold Case Detective suggests Calayca may have been washing her feet at the cascades and was attacked by a stranger, alleging that the socks found near the Hewitson River only appeared to be too large because they had been saturated with water and that the footprint found near the site may have belonged to her attacker, though no signs of a struggle were found at the scene. The program also suggested Calayca was the victim of a crime of opportunity as her ethnicity could have led a stranger to believe she was an Indigenous woman, leading a passerby to target her as has happened along remote sections of road elsewhere in Canada like the Highway of Tears; or that police may have invited her into a vehicle and then left her in a remote location similar to the treatment faced by Indigenous people victimized by "starlight tours" in Saskatoon.

The OPP do not suspect Calayca was the victim of foul play.

=== Incomplete search areas ===
Jeff Hasse, a volunteer with the Search, Rescue, and Recovery Resources of Minnesota nonprofit organization, stated in a March 2009 interview that he believed volunteers located Calayca's remains during a November 2008 search of Rainbow Falls Provincial Park. During this privately-funded search, six cadaver dogs indicated the presence of human remains at a location in the Hewitson River but further investigation was made impossible by the speed and depth of the water.

In justifying the OPP's involvement in the June 2008 survey of Rainbow Falls National Park, OPP Sgt. Eric Luoto stated that in spite of the aerial surveillance done during the initial search there were a number of large crevices in the area which could only be surveyed on the ground and should only be entered by trained professionals. Volunteer firefighter and search team member Matt Borutski has defended the misadventure hypothesis, noting that some sections of the forest are so dense that if a person were to become immobilized the mass of surrounding vegetation would be enough to keep their body upright, obscuring them from view. This notion was reinforced by OPP Constable Greg Beazley, who also participated in the search and told journalists at the time the vegetation was "so thick that if you trip, you don't fall down". Borutski also questioned the effectiveness of aircraft in the search, noting that at times a police helicopter would be directly above him but tree cover prevented the helicopter from seeing any of the searchers on the ground and vice versa. Pat Halonen, who helped to organize the first volunteer search for Calayca, later told journalists that the amount of leaves in the canopies had blocked air searchers' line of sight with the ground, and that the significant amount of leaves on the forest floor even created challenges for volunteers searching the area on foot.

Don Webster, a former police sergeant and the OPP Provincial Search & Rescue Coordinator for nine years, stated in a 2021 interview that the lack of evidence turned up by the initial search for Calayca suggests she may have defied expectations and covered more ground than search teams believed a hiker could cover, explaining why their search efforts were unable to locate her remains. He also proposed that the absence of clues could indicate that she was abducted, as this would also not produce the kind of evidence typically left by a lost hiker.

== See also ==
- List of people who disappeared mysteriously (2000–present)
