= Bull Lake (Thunder Bay District) =

Lake in Thunder Bay District, Ontario, Canada

- Location within Ontario
- Location: Thunder Bay District, Ontario
- Coordinates: 48°54′37″N 87°23′36″W
- Primary outflows: Unnamed creek to the Whitesand River
- Basin countries: Canada
- Max. length: 1.1 km (0.68 mi)
- Max. width: .16 km (0.099 mi)
- Surface elevation: 397 m (1,302 ft)

Bull Lake is a lake in Thunder Bay District, Ontario, Canada. It is about 1,100 metres (3,609 ft) long and 160 metres (525 ft) wide, and lies at an elevation of 397 metres (1,302 ft) about 14.3 kilometres (8.9 mi) northwest of the community of Schreiber. The primary outflow is an unnamed creek to a point on the Whitesand River, between Hornblende Lake upstream and Lyne Lake downstream.
