= Ambrose Lake (Thunder Bay District) =

Lake in Thunder Bay District, Ontario, Canada

- Location within Ontario
- Location: Thunder Bay District, Ontario
- Coordinates: 48°55′00″N 87°21′39″W
- Primary outflows: Unnamed creek to the Whitesand River
- Basin countries: Canada
- Max. length: 1.2 km (0.75 mi)
- Max. width: .3 km (0.19 mi)
- Surface elevation: 346 m (1,135 ft)

Ambrose Lake is a lake in Thunder Bay District, Ontario, Canada. It is about 1,200 metres (3,937 ft) long and 300 metres (984 ft) wide, and lies at an elevation of 346 metres (1,135 ft) about 13.5 kilometres (8.4 mi) northwest of the community of Schreiber. The primary outflow is an unnamed creek to the Whitesand River, between Longcanoe Lake and Hornblende Lake.
