= Pick Lake (Thunder Bay District) =

Lake in Thunder Bay District, Ontario, Canada

- Location within Ontario
- Location: Thunder Bay District, Ontario
- Coordinates: 48°57′33″N 87°23′13″W
- Primary outflows: Unnamed creek to unnamed lake on the Whitesand River
- Basin countries: Canada
- Max. length: 1 km (0.62 mi)
- Max. width: .4 km (0.25 mi)
- Surface elevation: 399 m (1,309 ft)

Pick Lake is a lake in Thunder Bay District, Ontario, Canada. It is shaped like a pickaxe, is about 1,000 metres (3,281 ft) long and 400 metres (1,312 ft) wide, and lies at an elevation of 399 metres (1,309 ft) about 18.5 kilometres (11.5 mi) northwest of the community of Schreiber. The primary outflow is an unnamed creek to an unnamed lake on the Whitesand River, between Demijohn Lake and Gumboot Lake.
