= Winston Lake =

Winston Lake may refer to:

- Winston Lake (Kenora District), Northwestern Ontario, Canada
- Winston Lake (Thunder Bay District), Ontario, Canada
