= Winston Creek =

Winston Creek may refer to:

- Winston Creek (Kenora District), a stream in Ontario, Canada
- Winston Creek (Thunder Bay District), a stream in Ontario, Canada
