= Rainbow Falls Provincial Park =

Provincial park in Ontario, Canada

- IUCN category II (national park)
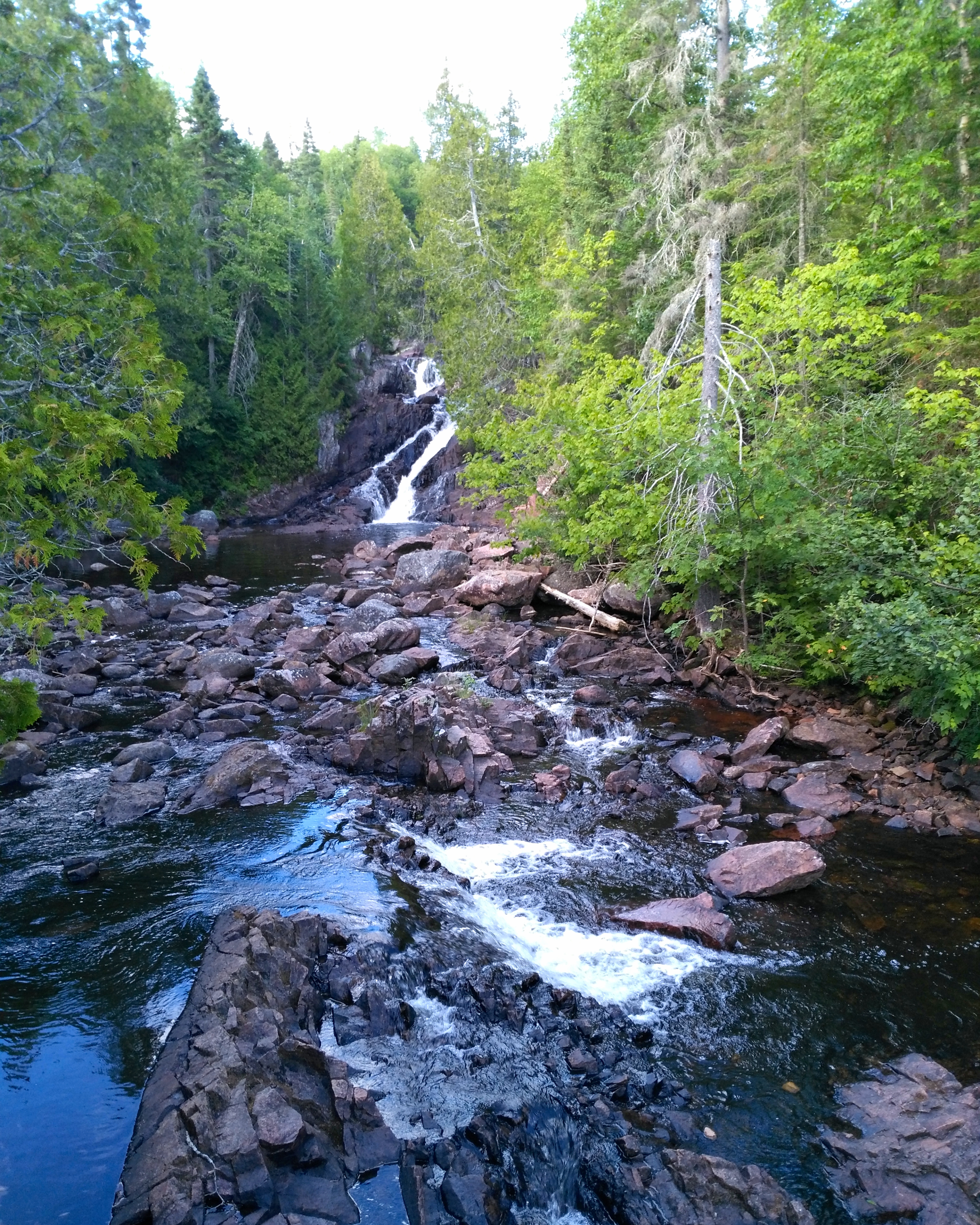
- Rainbow Falls on the Hewitson River

- Location within Ontario
- Interactive map of Rainbow Falls Provincial Park
- Location: Thunder Bay District, Ontario, Canada
- Nearest city: Schreiber
- Coordinates: 48°50′32″N 87°23′43″W
- Area: 575 ha (1,420 acres)
- Established: 1963
- Visitors: 33,408 (in 2022)
- Governing body: Ontario Parks
- Website: www.ontarioparks.com/park/rainbowfalls

Rainbow Falls Provincial Park is a recreation-class provincial park within the Ontario Parks system. This 575-hectare (1,421-acre) park consists of two non-contiguous parts: Whitesand Lake campground in the main park, and the historic Rossport Campground, east of the fishing community of Rossport, Ontario, which provides campsites along the rough and rocky shorelines of Lake Superior.

The Whitesand Lake campground is on the shores of Whitesand Lake and offers scenic trails to the park's namesake falls on the Hewitson River. The Rainbow Falls Trail has a waterside boardwalk trail. There is also the Back-40 trail, which goes through an abandoned campground to a panoramic view of the Lake Superior shoreline. This park runs a small Natural Heritage Education program with a small visitor centre on the beach and an interpretive program offered on Saturdays and Sundays during the summer months. Both campgrounds are just off Highway 17 between Rossport and Schreiber.

In August 2007, 20-year-old camper Christina Calayca disappeared while jogging in the park. The park, which investigators described as "one of the most rugged" areas in the province, was extensively searched a total of four times between August 2007 and October 2009, but none successfully located Calayca or evidence which could explain her disappearance and the case remains unsolved as of 2022.
