= Gumboot Lake =

Lake in Ontario, Canada

- Location within Ontario
- Location: Thunder Bay District, Ontario
- Coordinates: 48°56′07″N 87°22′20″W
- Primary inflows: Whitesand River
- Primary outflows: Whitesand River
- Basin countries: Canada
- Max. length: .75 km (0.47 mi)
- Max. width: .29 km (0.18 mi)
- Surface elevation: 345 m (1,132 ft)

Gumboot Lake is a lake in Thunder Bay District, Ontario, Canada. It is about 750 metres (2,461 ft) long and 290 metres (951 ft) wide, and lies at an elevation of 345 metres (1,132 ft) about 15 kilometres (9.3 mi) northwest of the community of Schreiber. The primary inflow and outflow is the Whitesand River, which flows downstream to Longcanoe Lake.
