= Longcanoe Lake =

Lake in Ontario, Canada

- Location within Ontario
- Location: Thunder Bay District, Ontario, Canada
- Coordinates: 48°55′41″N 87°21′57″W
- Primary inflows: Whitesand River from Gumboot Lake
- Primary outflows: Whitesand River to Hornblende Lake
- Basin countries: Canada
- Max. length: 1.1 km (0.68 mi)
- Max. width: .25 km (0.16 mi)
- Surface elevation: 345 m (1,132 ft)

Longcanoe Lake is a narrow lake in Thunder Bay District, Ontario, Canada about 15 kilometres (9 mi) north-east of the community of Rossport and 11 kilometres (7 mi) north of Highway 17. It is oriented in a north–south direction and is about 1,100 metres (3,609 ft) long and 250 metres (820 ft) at its widest, at its north end. The lake is part of the Whitesand River system and flows out at its south end via this river into Hornblende Lake, and eventually via the Hewitson River into Lake Superior. A mine access road travels along the eastern shore of the lake.
