= Collingwood Schreiber =

Sir Collingwood Schreiber
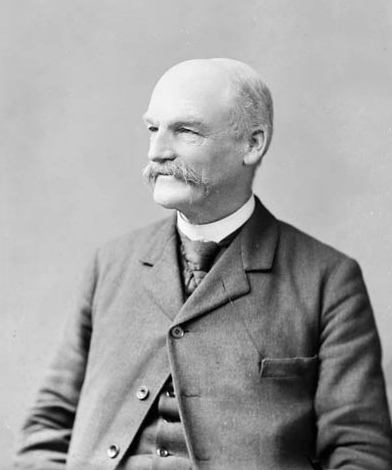
- Sir Collingwood Schreiber in 1897
- Born: December 14, 1831; Bradwell-on-Sea, Essex, England
- Died: March 23, 1918 (aged 86); Ottawa, Ontario, Canada

Sir Collingwood Schreiber, KCMG (December 14, 1831 – March 23, 1918) was an English Canadian surveyor, engineer and civil servant. He is best known for his contribution to the completion of the Canadian Pacific Railway (CPR).

== Biography ==
Schreiber was born in Bradwell-on-Sea, Essex, England to the Reverend Thomas Schreiber and Sarah Bingham. His father's grandfather, Johann Karl Schreiber emigrated from Swabia, Germany to England in the mid-18th century. His mother's father was rear admiral Joseph Bingham, and her grandfather was vice-admiral Sir William Parker, 1st Baronet, of Harburn.

Schreiber trained in England, and then emigrated to Canada in 1852, along with the rest of his family. He shortly thereafter began work as a railway engineer with the Toronto, Hamilton and Buffalo Railway. After four years with the firm, Schreiber left to work with Sir Sandford Fleming. After working on various private railways, in 1864 Schreiber received his first government appointment, and by 1873 he was the chief engineer for all government railways.

Schreiber became intimately involved in the construction of the CPR. In June 1880, Schreiber was appointed by Sir Charles Tupper, who was then the Minister of Railways and Canals, to replace Fleming as the chief engineer for the project, and by July of that same year had become general manager of all government railways in operation. He arranged financing and conducted repeated inspection tours, often with Sir William Cornelius Van Horne, who was appointed CPR president in 1881.

In 1887, Schreiber was a founding member of the Canadian Society of Civil Engineers.

In 1892 he was made the deputy minister of railways and canals.

In 1893, he was made a Companion of the Order of St Michael and St George and, in 1916, a Knight Commander.

In 1905 he took a position as consulting engineer on the western or Grand Trunk Pacific division of the National Transcontinental Railway".

Schreiber continued in government service until his death in 1918.

Despite living in an era rife with corruption, Schreiber always paid more attention to engineering than political concerns. He found a job for prime minister Sir John A. Macdonald's nephew, but flatly refused to promote people with influence unless their performance merited it. He repeatedly clashed with political "meddlers", and was disliked by various ministers in the Macdonald and Laurier administrations he served under.

Schreiber died in Ottawa, Ontario. The township of Schreiber, Ontario, is named after him and contains a plaque commemorating his life and achievements.
