= North Whitesand Lake =

Lake in Thunder Bay District, Ontario, Canada

- Location in Ontario
- Location: Thunder Bay District, Ontario
- Coordinates: 48°59′02″N 87°19′54″W
- Part of: Great Lakes Basin
- Primary outflows: Whitesand River
- Basin countries: Canada
- Max. length: 680 m (2,230 ft)
- Max. width: 560 m (1,840 ft)
- Surface area: 11.08 ha (27.4 acres)
- Surface elevation: 512 m (1,680 ft)

North Whitesand Lake is a lake in the Unorganized Part of Thunder Bay District in Northwestern Ontario, Canada. It is the source of the Whitesand River, and is part of the Great Lakes Basin (Lake Superior basin).

The lake is about 680 metres (2,230 ft) long and 560 metres (1,840 ft) wide, has an area of 11.08 hectares (27.4 acres), and lies at an elevation of 512 metres (1,680 ft). There are two unnamed inflows: one at the northeast and one at the southeast. The primary outflow, at the west of the lake and heading west, is the Whitesand River.
