= Zenith Lake (Ontario) =

Lake in Ontario, Canada

- Location within Ontario Location within Canada
- Location: Thunder Bay District, Ontario
- Coordinates: 48°57′49″N 87°22′35″W
- Primary inflows: Whitesand River
- Primary outflows: Whitesand River
- Basin countries: Canada
- Max. length: .45 km (0.28 mi)
- Max. width: .15 km (0.093 mi)
- Surface elevation: 397 m (1,302 ft)

Zenith Lake is a lake in Thunder Bay District, Ontario, Canada. It is about 450 metres (1,476 ft) long and 150 metres (492 ft) wide, and lies at an elevation of 397 metres (1,302 ft). The primary inflow and outflow is the Whitesand River, and the lake is immediately downstream of Cleaver Lake.
