= Aguasabon River =

River in Canada

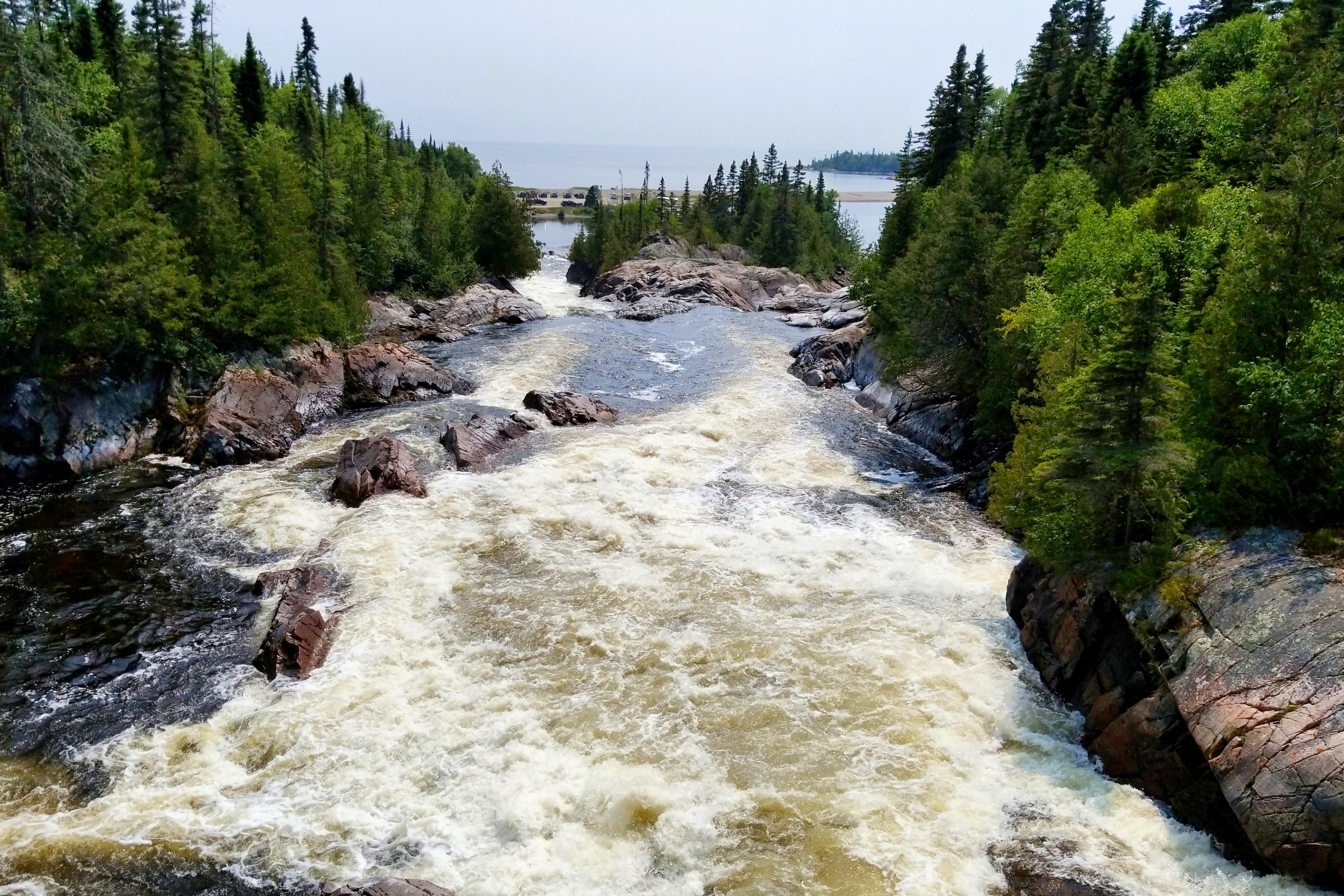
- Mouth of the Aguasabon River at Terrace Bay

- Location of the mouth of the Aguasabon River in Ontario

Location
- Country: Canada
- Province: Ontario
- District: Thunder Bay

Physical characteristics
- Source: Chorus Lake
  - coordinates: 49°14′12″N 87°09′43″W
  - elevation: 395 m (1,296 ft)
- Mouth: Lake Superior
  - location: Terrace Bay
  - coordinates: 48°46′22″N 87°07′00″W
  - elevation: 180 m (590 ft)
- Length: 70 km (43 mi)

Basin features
- River system: Great Lakes Basin

The Aguasabon River /ˌɑːɡwəˈsɑːbən/ is a river in Thunder Bay District, Ontario, Canada. The river originates at Chorus Lake and empties into Lake Superior near the community of Terrace Bay. When the Canadian Pacific Railway was being built 1882-1885, the river was known as the Black River at mileage 857 miles from Montreal, not to be confused with the Black River near Heron Bay.

The Aguasabon is 70 kilometres (43 mi) in length, and plunges down 30 metres (98 ft) at the Aguasabon Falls. The river follows fractures in the 2.6 billion-year-old bedrock, and the exposed rock is granodiorite.

== Aguasabon station ==
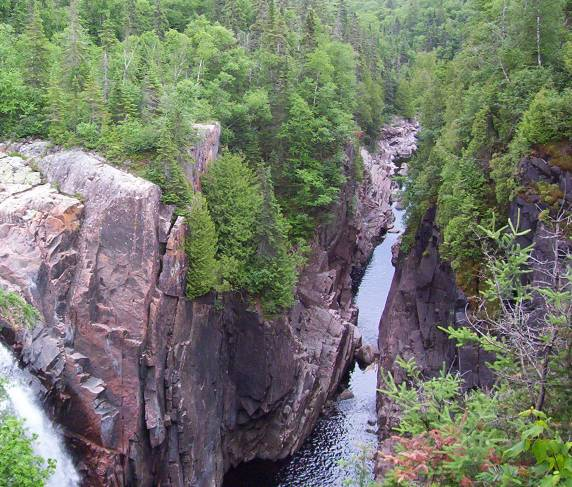
Aguasabon Gorge and Falls

Aguasabon Station is a dam and two unit hydroelectric power plant run by Ontario Power Generation. It generates power to support a Kimberly-Clark pulp and paper plant at Terrace Bay.

In 1945, the Hydro-Electric Power Commission of Ontario began preliminary survey work for a planned hydroelectric facility in the Terrace Bay area. Construction commenced in 1946 and the facility began operating in 1948. The development required five million hours of labour, a network of access roads, and the erection of 25 buildings including staff housing, a hospital, administration office, pump house, machine shops and laundry. The dam enlarged Hays Lake to five hundred times its original size, and forced the relocation of Ontario Highway 17, requiring a new bridge be constructed. As part of the project, the Hydro-Electric Power Commission of Ontario diverted the headwaters of the Kenogami River to flow south into Long Lake and into the Aguasabon River system to Lake Superior, rather than flowing north towards Hudson Bay via the Albany River.

== See also ==
- List of Ontario rivers
