= Jackfish, Ontario =

Human settlement in Ontario, Canada

Coordinates: 48°48′N 86°58′W

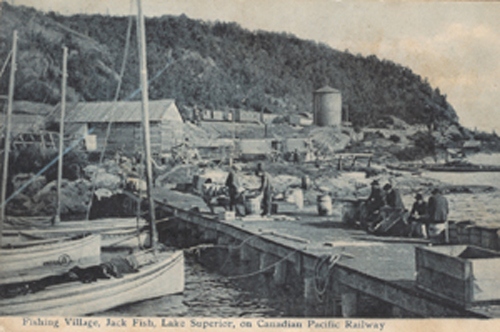
Fishing Village, Jack Fish, Lake Superior, on Canadian Pacific Railway c1906

Jackfish is a ghost town in northern Ontario, Canada, located on the north shore of Lake Superior east of Terrace Bay.

The last spike on the Canadian Pacific Railway (CPR) track between Montreal and Winnipeg was driven in west of Jackfish on May 16, 1885. Laying one particular mile of railway in this area is said to have cost $700,000.

Jackfish was established as a train order station on the CPR following the period of railway construction between 1883 and 1885. Initially a siding or passing track was built at this location to allow east and westbound trains to operate on the single track main line. An electrical telegraph enabled the station operator to control the movement of trains with information received from a train dispatcher.

With its location as a railway siding, along a beach area, amongst Lake Superior's otherwise rocky shoreline, Jackfish became a port of commercial fishing. Fish were caught here and packed in ice and loaded aboard trains bound for markets in Toronto and Montreal.

Fishing camps existed at Jackfish station as early as 1876, and fishermen were well established here when about 1889 Alex Clarke of Collingwood erected fishing shanties. The 1894 roster of pound and gill net fishermen included A. Alexander, John Kerr, Ben Almos, Alex Olsen and Co. and H. Anderson and Co., followed by Jacob Hendricks in 1897 and Peter Dahl, Sr. in 1900. The Jackfish trout derby was a popular event during the 1930s and 1940s attracting sportsmen from distant parts of Ontario and the United States. During the peak years of the 1900s approximately 40 families were settled in Jackfish and school enrollment was 45 students.

In 1895 Jackfish was established as a port to receive coal required as fuel for steam trains travelling on the CPR. A dock outfitted with cranes allowed large ships to unload their cargo. From this point, the coal was loaded into cars and delivered to CPR coaling depots such as Schreiber and White River. With the increased activity of steam locomotives shunting cars around, a large water tower was located near the railway tracks.

In the 1930s A lumber company here sent logs by ship for use at pulp mills in the United States.

During World War II, young Canadian men of Japanese origin from British Columbia were sent to road construction camps, including one at Jackfish, to work on the construction of the Trans-Canada Highway.

With the dieselization of CPR's motive power and replacement of its steam engines in the 1950s, the fortunes of the town began to decline. The fish stocks also collapsed with the introduction of the sea lamprey into the Great Lakes.

The Lakeview Hotel at Jackfish, built at the end of the 19th century, remained a popular stopping place during the summer for a number of years. The hotel burned down in 1960. By September, 1963 two families remained in Jackfish and they moved out of the town a month later. Hence, the town site was totally abandoned, and after the newer 500-foot long CPR dock was removed in 1963 shore structures were left exposed to high water and deteriorated rapidly. .

The name Jackfish and its railroad connection still exist. The Canadian Pacific Railway operates and maintains a siding named Jackfish located just east of the original Jackfish townsite. The siding is part of the operating infrastructure making up the Heron Bay Subdivision, a defined piece of track which extends from White River to Schreiber, Ontario. Jackfish siding is 14,000 feet in length. It is a signalled siding rated for 30 mph. The signals and switches are part of a Centralized Traffic Control (CTC) system operated by a Rail Traffic Controller situated in Canadian Pacific Railway's headquarters in Calgary, Alberta.

"Jackfish" is a common name for the Northern Pike.
