= Cleaver Lake (Thunder Bay District) =

Lake in Thunder Bay District, Ontario, Canada

- Location within Ontario
- Location: Thunder Bay District, Ontario
- Coordinates: 48°58′09″N 87°22′47″W
- Primary inflows: Whitesand River
- Primary outflows: Whitesand River
- Basin countries: Canada
- Max. length: .85 km (0.53 mi)
- Max. width: .2 km (0.12 mi)
- Surface elevation: 401 m (1,316 ft)

Cleaver Lake is a lake in Thunder Bay District, Ontario, Canada. It is about 850 metres (2,789 ft) long and 200 metres (656 ft) wide, and lies at an elevation of 401 metres (1,316 ft) about 19.5 kilometres (12.1 mi) northwest of the community of Schreiber. The primary inflow and outflow is the Whitesand River, and the lake is immediately upstream of Zenith Lake.
