= Voyageur Hiking Trail =

Trail in northern Ontario, Canada

Coordinates: 48.348948°N 86.176758°W

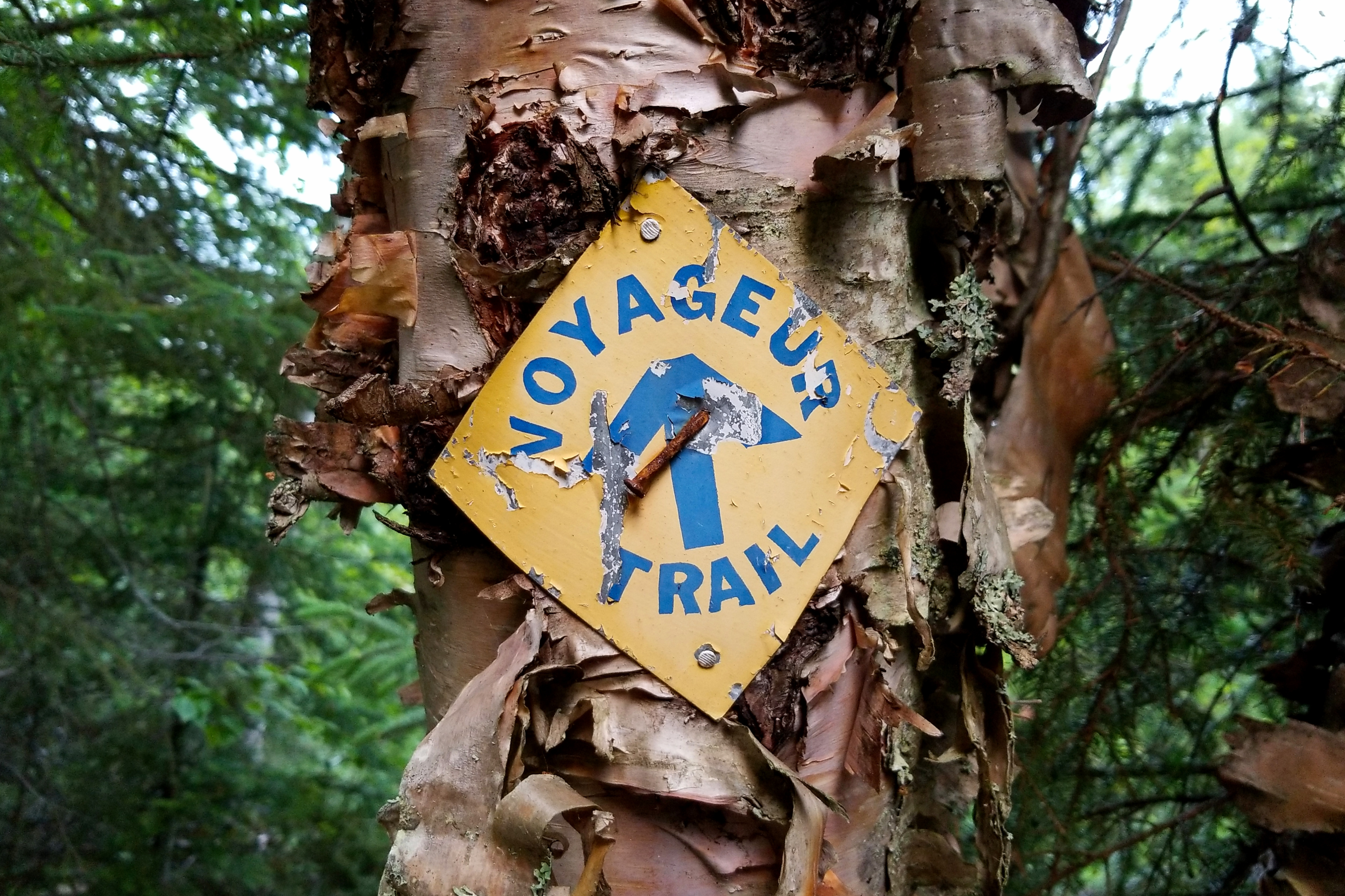
- Voyageur Hiking Trail marker
- Length: 500 km (310 mi)
- Location: Northern Ontario
- Trailheads: Thunder Bay, Ontario; Sudbury, Ontario
- Use: Hiking, Snowshoeing, Skiing

The Voyageur Hiking Trail is a public hiking trail between Sudbury and Thunder Bay in Northern Ontario, Canada. The name honours the early European fur traders of the region who travelled largely by canoe and were known as 'voyageurs’ and ‘coureurs des bois’ (runners of the woods) The trail is used by all ages and levels of experience, from the day hiker and trail runner to the hardy backpacker.

== Overview ==
The trail dates to 1973, and is a work in progress that has involved hundreds of volunteers, private sector and government supporters. It is designed for foot traffic in summer and snowshoe/ski traffic in winter

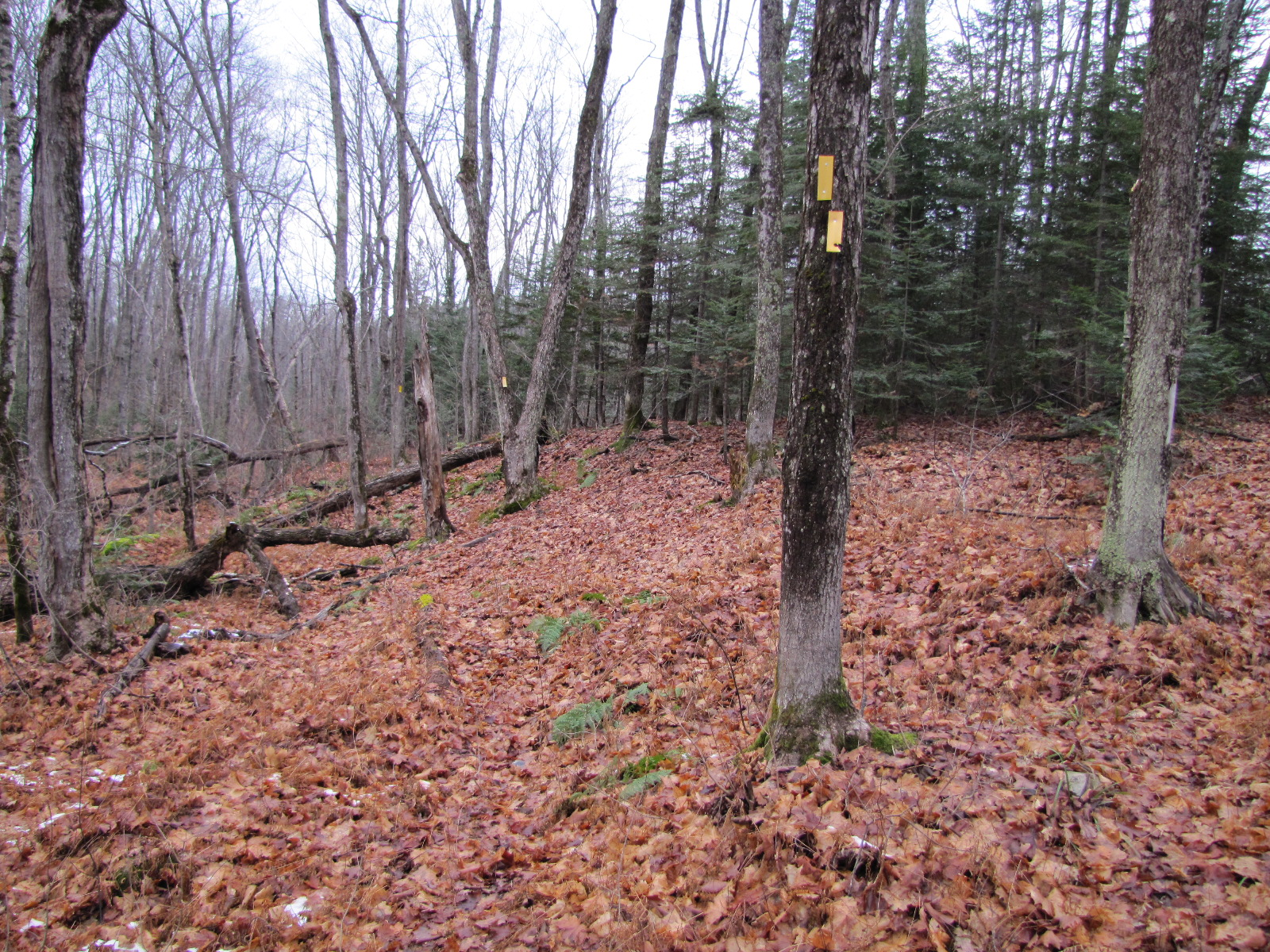
Typical hardwood forest in fall along yellow-blazed loop trail

Close to half the linear trail has been completed (some 500 km) plus numerous side trails. The hiking trail crosses the vast privately and publicly owned forests of this rugged wilderness. The largest city on the completed trail is Sault Ste. Marie, situated between two of the Great Lakes – Lake Superior and Lake Huron – and bordering on the state of Michigan. The route parallels these two great bodies of water, frequently touching on the shoreline or affording glimpses from distant promontories. The trail passes through or near many other communities along the route including Blind River, Iron Bridge, Wawa, Marathon, Terrace Bay, Schreiber, Rossport and Nipigon.

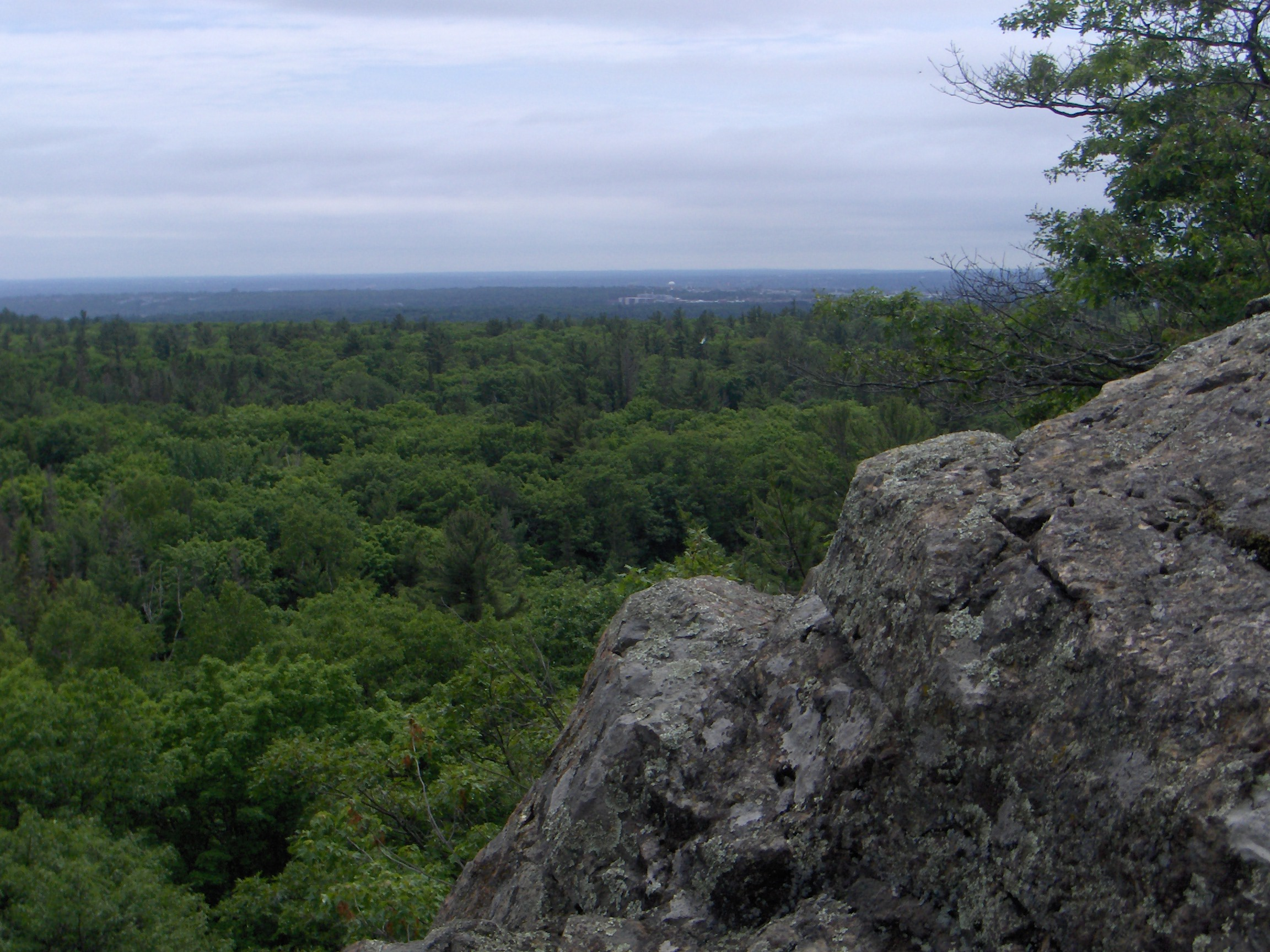
View from Lookout on Odena Loop Trail

While most of the trail has been built and maintained by volunteer members, portions within Provincial and Federal Park lands have been included with the consent of those agencies. The Voyageur Trail Association was created as a not-for-profit entity; individual club members are responsible for maintaining the footpaths within their areas. Each active club is represented on an elected Coordinating Council that oversees the affairs of the Association. Clubs offer scheduled outings as a way to meet fellow hikers and explore new trails. The Association is one of some 30 formal hiking organizations across Ontario represented by Hike Ontario, the provincial voice for hikers. The Voyageur Trail forms part of the land route of the Trans Canada Trail.

A trail guidebook (now out-of-print) provided trail users with up-to-date maps and descriptions of the available trails. As of 2020 the guidebook was replaced by detailed digital maps on the Ondago platform, which are available as a benefit to members. In addition, GPX tracks of the trail can be downloaded to GPS units for on-trail navigation.

== Early history ==
Planning of the Voyageur Hiking Trail began on March 23, 1973 when the then Commissioner of Parks and Recreation for the City of Sault Ste. Marie, Harold Brain, convened a meeting of ‘persons interested in establishing a hiking trail along the precipice of the Cambrian Shield’ from Gros Cap on Lake Superior to Hiawatha Park, just north of Sault Ste. Marie. One of those in attendance, Dr. Paul D. Syme, a Sault Ste. Marie forest research scientist and member of the Bruce Trail Association, immediately saw the possibility of extending this concept to extend northward to Thunder Bay and eastward to Espanola, then south across Manitoulin Island to link up with southern Ontario's Bruce Trail. The vision has since evolved to link eastward with trails in the Sudbury region.

Dr. Paul Syme was the leader of the group, which on October 24, 1973 chose the name “Voyageur Trail Association (VTA)” for their newly established group. He was the first elected president of the VTA. Syme met with officials of the Bruce Trail Association, seeking advice and trail building training, and bringing that knowledge back to the Sault visionaries. The group adopted the southern Ontario model of dividing the trail into sections and assigning responsibility for trail building, landowner relations, maintenance, public hikes, promotion, etc. to local Voyageur Hiking Trail Clubs.

A draft constitution was presented on November 15, 1973. On this basis, an interim board of directors was installed (President, Paul Syme; Vice President, Ralph Yanni; Treasurer, Ralph Wood). Ian Morrison acted as general secretary at this meeting and was elected general secretary shortly thereafter. On July 3, 1974, the association was formally chartered as a corporation without share capital. Dieter Ropke was the longest-serving member of the board of directors, holding the position of treasurer for over 30 years.

The Rainbow Section (now abandoned owing to the folding of the local club) near Espanola was the first hikeable Voyageur Trail Section in 1973. In 1974, George Morrison, a teacher in Espanola, invited guests to hike the trail, which became the first organized outing on the Voyageur Hiking Trail. The Saulteaux was the first Voyageur Hiking Trail Club formally established in 1974 and the Saulteaux Section officially opened for hiking at a ceremony on September 21, 1975. The trail system continues to be a work-in-progress, with new development centring around communities.

The Voyageur Trail News, a regular newsletter for members and landowners, was first published on January 15, 1975. A full archive of newsletters is provided on the website.
