= Lyne Lake =

Lake in Ontario, Canada

- Location within Ontario
- Location: Thunder Bay District, Ontario
- Coordinates: 48°52′10″N 87°21′43″W
- Primary inflows: Ross Creek, Whitesand River
- Primary outflows: Whitesand River
- Basin countries: Canada
- Max. length: 4.3 km (2.7 mi)
- Max. width: .9 km (0.56 mi)
- Surface elevation: 295 m (968 ft)

Lyne Lake is a lake in Thunder Bay District, Ontario, Canada. It is about 4,300 metres (14,108 ft) long and 900 metres (2,953 ft) wide, and lies at an elevation of 295 metres (968 ft). The primary inflows are the Whitesand River, flowing downstream from Hornblende Lake, as well as Ross Creek, and the outflow is the Whitesand River downstream to the river's mouth at Whitesand Lake.
