= Terrace Bay =

- Township (single-tier)
- Township of Terrace Bay
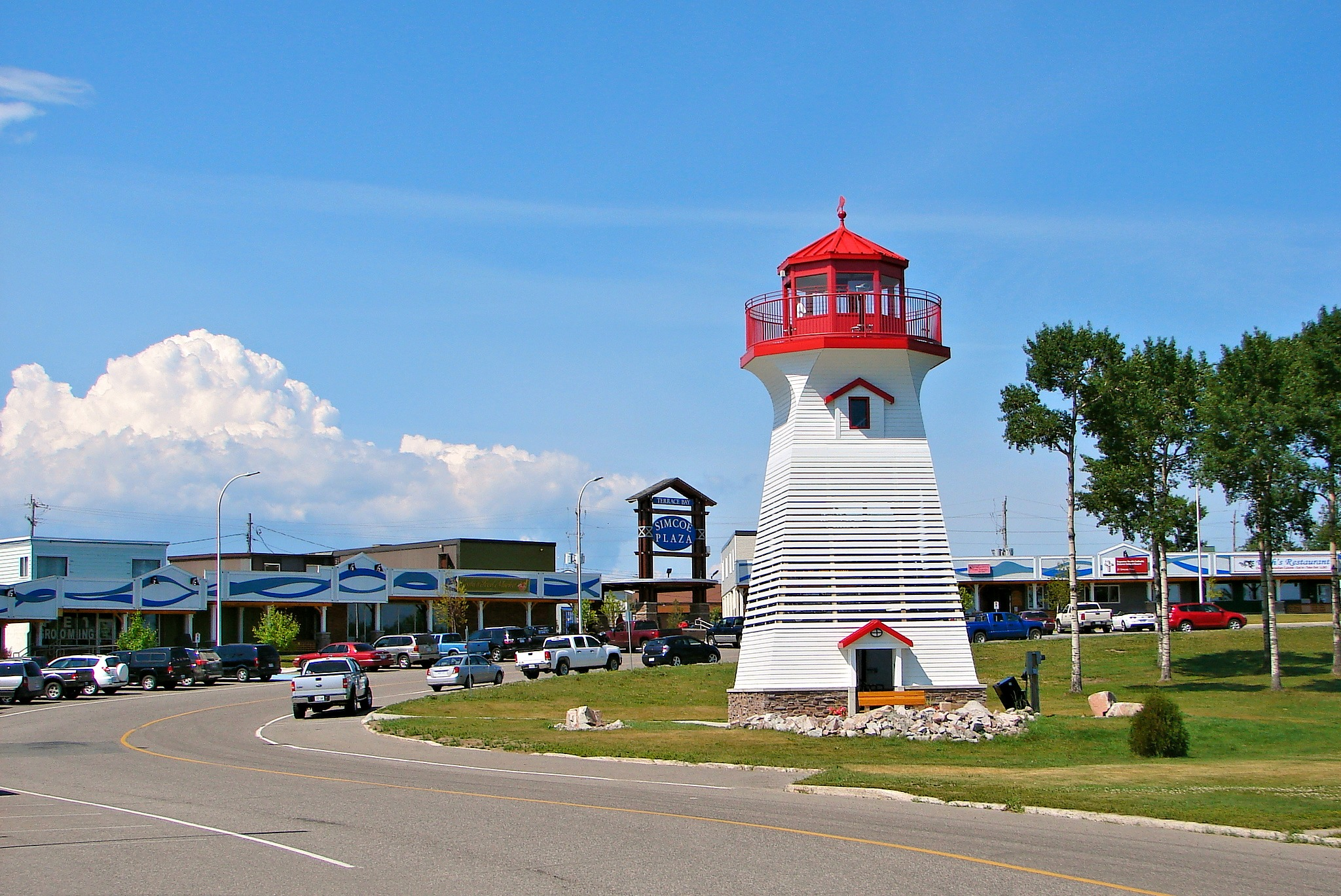
- Motto: Gem of the Northshore
- Location within Ontario
- Coordinates: 48°48′N 87°06′W
- Country: Canada
- Province: Ontario
- District: Thunder Bay
- Settled: 1940s
- Incorporated: 1959

Government
  - Mayor: Paul Malashewski
  - Fed. riding: Thunder Bay—Superior North
  - Prov. riding: Thunder Bay—Superior North

Area
  - Land: 151.50 km^{2} (58.49 sq mi)

Population (2021)
  - Total: 1,528
  - Density: 10.1/km^{2} (26/sq mi)
- Time zone: UTC−05:00 (EST)
  - Summer (DST): UTC−04:00 (EDT)
- Postal code FSA: P0T
- Area code: 807
- Website: www.terracebay.ca

Terrace Bay is a township in Thunder Bay District in northern Ontario, Canada, located on the north shore of Lake Superior east of Thunder Bay along Highway 17. The name originates from a series of lake terraces formed as the water level in Lake Superior lowered following the latest ice age.

== History ==
Terrace Bay originated as a company town in the 1940s when a pulp and paper mill was established there by the Longlac Pulp & Paper Company, later renamed Kimberly-Clark Forest Products. At the same time, the Aguasabon Generating Station was created by the Ontario Hydro water division, to redirect the northward flowing Long Lake south through the Aguasabon River system to Lake Superior.

On September 1, 1947, Terrace Bay was granted status as an Improvement District. The pulp mill was the lead developer with construction of the community's basic infrastructure. By the end of 1948, Terrace Bay consisted of about 230 houses serviced with sewer, water and electricity but surrounded only by bush as the highway was still not completed through the town. In 1951, the Lakeview subdivision was started, with sewer, water and electrical services provided for well over 100 houses. By December 31, 33 of the 35 new houses were completed and occupied.

Other additions to the community were two new churches, 22-bed modern hospital, post office, bank, liquor store, theatre, clothing store and railway station. Construction of the Memorial Recreation Centre was completed in July 1953. The building consisted of an arena, curling club, restaurant, bowling alley, library, offices, three meeting rooms and public washrooms. In 1958, the mill converted to chlorine dioxide bleaching and had sold 63 houses to employees and another 28 houses were privately built. The next year, Terrace Bay became a municipal township.

In 1972, the Kimberly Clark Pulp and Paper Company Ltd. and Kimberly Clark of Canada Ltd. amalgamated. From 1972 to 1977 the population of Terrace Bay increased from 1,755 to 2,299 persons, directly attributed to Kimberly Clark's expansion program. The pulp mill was the lifeblood of the region and in 2005 Kimberly-Clark sold the mill to Neenah Paper Inc, who then sold the mill to Buchanan Forestry Products in 2006. The mill was renamed to Terrace Bay Pulp Inc. It operated until it ran into financial hardship and was shut down in 2009. After financial reorganization, it reopened in October 2010 to strong pulp markets. However, soon thereafter the mill ran into financial trouble again and had to declare bankruptcy and look for a buyer. In July 2012, the Aditya Birla Group agreed to purchase the mill.

On January 5, 2024 the mill went into an idle state and 400 workers were laid off indefinitely.

The municipality carried out a plan for growth in 2010/2011 including the downtown revitalization plan, the cultural centre project, and a rebranding of the township based on Lake Superior and the new Terrace Bay Lighthouse attraction that was built. The community continues to look at new ways to encourage job growth and support the business community.

== Geography ==
Terrace Bay is in the Boreal Forest zone with white birch as its most common tree.

The Slate Islands, now a provincial park, are located in Lake Superior within Terrace Bay's municipal limits. The island features the highest lighthouse on Lake Superior, the largest known shatter cone in the world, abandoned gold mines, and wildlife including the largest unthreatened boreal woodland caribou population in Canada. Visitors can book charters to the Slate Islands by local tourist outfitters.

=== Climate ===
Terrace Bay has a humid continental climate (Koppen: Dfb) bordering on a subarctic climate (Koppen: Dfc). September has an average temperature of only 1.8 °F (1 °C) more than the 50 degree isotherm used to determine subarctic climates. Summers are very mild due to the moderation of nearby Lake Superior, with the warmest month, August, only having an average high of 68.4 degrees Fahrenheit (20.2 c). Winters are long, cold, and snowy, averaging 83 inches (2,100 mm) of snow per year. Terrace Bay shows signs of seasonal lag, with August being warmer on average than July, likely due to the towns proximity to Lake Superior, which causes towns on the lake influenced by the lake, to take longer to warm up than towns not on or near the lake.

Climate data for Terrace Bay (1981−2010)
Month	Jan	Feb	Mar	Apr	May	Jun	Jul	Aug	Sep	Oct	Nov	Dec	Year
Record high °C (°F)	5.0 (41.0)	9.5 (49.1)	13.0 (55.4)	24.0 (75.2)	29.4 (84.9)	30.5 (86.9)	30.0 (86.0)	34.0 (93.2)	25.0 (77.0)	23.0 (73.4)	17.0 (62.6)	8.0 (46.4)	34.0 (93.2)
Mean daily maximum °C (°F)	−8.6 (16.5)	−6.4 (20.5)	−0.8 (30.6)	6.6 (43.9)	13.6 (56.5)	17.6 (63.7)	19.9 (67.8)	20.2 (68.4)	15.1 (59.2)	8.3 (46.9)	0.8 (33.4)	−5.3 (22.5)	6.7 (44.1)
Daily mean °C (°F)	−14.3 (6.3)	−12.5 (9.5)	−6.3 (20.7)	1.3 (34.3)	8.1 (46.6)	12.2 (54.0)	14.7 (58.5)	15.4 (59.7)	11.0 (51.8)	4.6 (40.3)	−2.8 (27.0)	−9.9 (14.2)	1.8 (35.2)
Mean daily minimum °C (°F)	−20.0 (−4.0)	−18.6 (−1.5)	−11.8 (10.8)	−4.0 (24.8)	2.5 (36.5)	6.7 (44.1)	9.5 (49.1)	10.7 (51.3)	6.8 (44.2)	0.9 (33.6)	−6.4 (20.5)	−14.5 (5.9)	−3.2 (26.2)
Record low °C (°F)	−45.0 (−49.0)	−41.0 (−41.8)	−35.0 (−31.0)	−25.0 (−13.0)	−11.1 (12.0)	−5.0 (23.0)	−0.5 (31.1)	−1.0 (30.2)	−10.5 (13.1)	−15.0 (5.0)	−25.5 (−13.9)	−40.0 (−40.0)	−45.0 (−49.0)
Average precipitation mm (inches)	52.9 (2.08)	39.8 (1.57)	33.9 (1.33)	38.9 (1.53)	78.6 (3.09)	83.7 (3.30)	90.4 (3.56)	88.0 (3.46)	104.5 (4.11)	91.7 (3.61)	48.2 (1.90)	56.2 (2.21)	806.8 (31.76)
Average rainfall mm (inches)	0.4 (0.02)	2.7 (0.11)	5.9 (0.23)	27.7 (1.09)	77.9 (3.07)	83.7 (3.30)	90.4 (3.56)	88.0 (3.46)	104.3 (4.11)	89.0 (3.50)	22.9 (0.90)	3.8 (0.15)	596.1 (23.47)
Average snowfall cm (inches)	52.5 (20.7)	37.1 (14.6)	28.0 (11.0)	11.2 (4.4)	0.6 (0.2)	0.0 (0.0)	0.0 (0.0)	0.0 (0.0)	0.3 (0.1)	2.7 (1.1)	25.3 (10.0)	52.4 (20.6)	210.2 (82.8)
Average precipitation days (≥ 0.2 mm)	8.9	7.0	6.5	5.7	10.7	11.3	12.5	13.0	14.7	13.7	9.3	9.7	123.0
Average rainy days (≥ 0.2 mm)	0.12	0.44	1.1	3.6	10.6	11.3	12.5	13.0	14.7	13.1	4.1	0.81	85.3
Average snowy days (≥ 0.2 cm)	8.8	6.6	5.6	2.1	0.28	0.0	0.0	0.0	0.12	0.88	5.9	9.3	39.6
Source: Environment Canada

== Demographics ==
In the 2021 Census of Population conducted by Statistics Canada, Terrace Bay had a population of 1,528 living in 713 of its 793 total private dwellings, a change of −5.2% from its 2016 population of 1,611. With a land area of 151.5 km^{2} (58.5 sq mi), it had a population density of 10.1/km^{2} (26.1/sq mi) in 2021.

In the same census, the designated place portion of Terrace Bay had a population of 1,523 living in 710 of its 789 total private dwellings, a change of −5.2% from its 2016 population of 1,606. With a land area of 9.42 km^{2} (3.64 sq mi), it had a population density of 161.7/km^{2} (418.7/sq mi) in 2021.

Canada census – Terrace Bay community profile

	2021	2016	2011
Population	1,528 (-5.2% from 2016)	1,611 (+9.5% from 2011)	1,471 (-9.5% from 2006)
Land area	151.50 km^{2} (58.49 sq mi)	152.82 km^{2} (59.00 sq mi)	151.04 km^{2} (58.32 sq mi)
Population density	10.1/km^{2} (26/sq mi)	10.5/km^{2} (27/sq mi)	9.7/km^{2} (25/sq mi)
Median age	48.8 (M: 48.4, F: 48.8)	50.8 (M: 50.2, F: 51.1)
Private dwellings	793 (total) 713 (occupied)	821 (total)	822 (total)
Median household income	$86,000	$75,328

References: 2021 2016 2011

Terrace Bay Historical populations

Year	Pop.	±%
1951	1,443	—
1956	1,624	+12.5%
1961	2,013	+24.0%
1966	1,966	−2.3%
1971	1,860	−5.4%
1976	2,098	+12.8%
1981	2,644	+26.0%
1986	2,692	+1.8%

Year	Pop.	±%
1991	2,477	−8.0%
1996	2,324	−6.2%
2001	1,950	−16.1%
2006	1,625	−16.7%
2011	1,471	−9.5%
2016	1,611	+9.5%
2021	1,528	−5.2%

Source: Statistics Canada

== Amenities ==
Terrace Bay's McCausland Hospital is a modern, fully accredited 45-bed community hospital. It serves a population of approximately 4,000 residents from the communities of Terrace Bay, Schreiber, Rossport, Jackfish and Pays Plat. Named for the town's first physician, Michael McCausland, the present structure was built in 1980 and is situated overlooking the shores of Lake Superior. The McCausland Hospital expanded in May 2011 with the creation of the Wilkes Terrace 22-bed long-term care facility. The Aguasabon Medical Clinic is located in the McCausland Hospital and has a full complement of physicians with same-day medical service. Upon moving to Terrace Bay and visiting the clinic, new residents are immediately assigned their own family physician.

The town has three elementary schools: Terrace Bay Public School, St. Martin's Catholic School, and École Catholique Franco-Terrace. Lake Superior High School accommodates students from surrounding communities.

The town's Recreation Centre holds a hockey arena, outdoor pool, curling rink, fitness centre, bowling alley, and various athletic courts. During the summer months, the Aquasabon Golf Course opens and during the winter months, the Trestle Ridge Ski Hill. The Voyageur Hiking Trail passes through the community. The Terrace Bay Cultural Centre was built in October 2010 which includes the expanded Terrace Bay Public Library, the Terrace Bay Seniors' Activity Centre, and the Michael King Community Hall.

The large majority of businesses, including a grocery store, pharmacy, post office, Liquor Control Board of Ontario (LCBO), flower shop, gift shops, a wellness hub, internet/tv/cell phone store, pub and various restaurants are located on the main street, Simcoe Plaza, which saw a major revitalization effort in 2011. Simcoe Plaza had renovations, landscaping, streetscaping, and the construction of a 50 ft (15 m) lighthouse attraction for visitors to climb and take in views of Lake Superior, the nearby Slate Islands, and the rest of the municipality.

Terrace Bay boasts a multitude of sandy beaches on the shores of Lake Superior as well as smaller inland lakes. Accessible by vehicle and hiking trails, the Lake Superior beaches boast waves in late summer that bring a variety of water sport lovers to the town, including surfers and body boarders. The inland lakes provide warm sheltered swimming for the many hikers and campers who come to the area.

== Dragfest ==
In 1999, local car enthusiasts' group Superior Classics Car Club began the annual three-day drag racing event known as Terrace Bay's Dragfest. In 1999 it had 187 competitors participating, which grew to over 300 in 2010, with spectators now numbering over 10,000. Most drivers originate from the Thunder Bay area, but the event has also attracted participants from Southern Ontario, Winnipeg, and Minnesota.

Over its twenty-year history, the race has been financially successful, allowing continued investment into permanent and improved facilities for competitors and spectators. Money has also been used to support local service clubs and charities, with total donations exceeding $150,000. Major recipients include the Camp Quality, Thunder Bay Regional Health Sciences Centre, Terrace Bay McCausland Hospital, local fire departments, ambulances, food bank, and animal shelters.

== Notable people ==
- Aaron MacKenzie, hockey player
- Danny Schock, hockey player
- Ron Schock, hockey player
- Charlie Simmer, hockey player
- Tim Hanley, hockey Player

== See also ==
- List of townships in Ontario
- List of francophone communities in Ontario
