= Whitesand Lake (Hewitson River) =

Lake in Thunder Bay District, Ontario, Canada

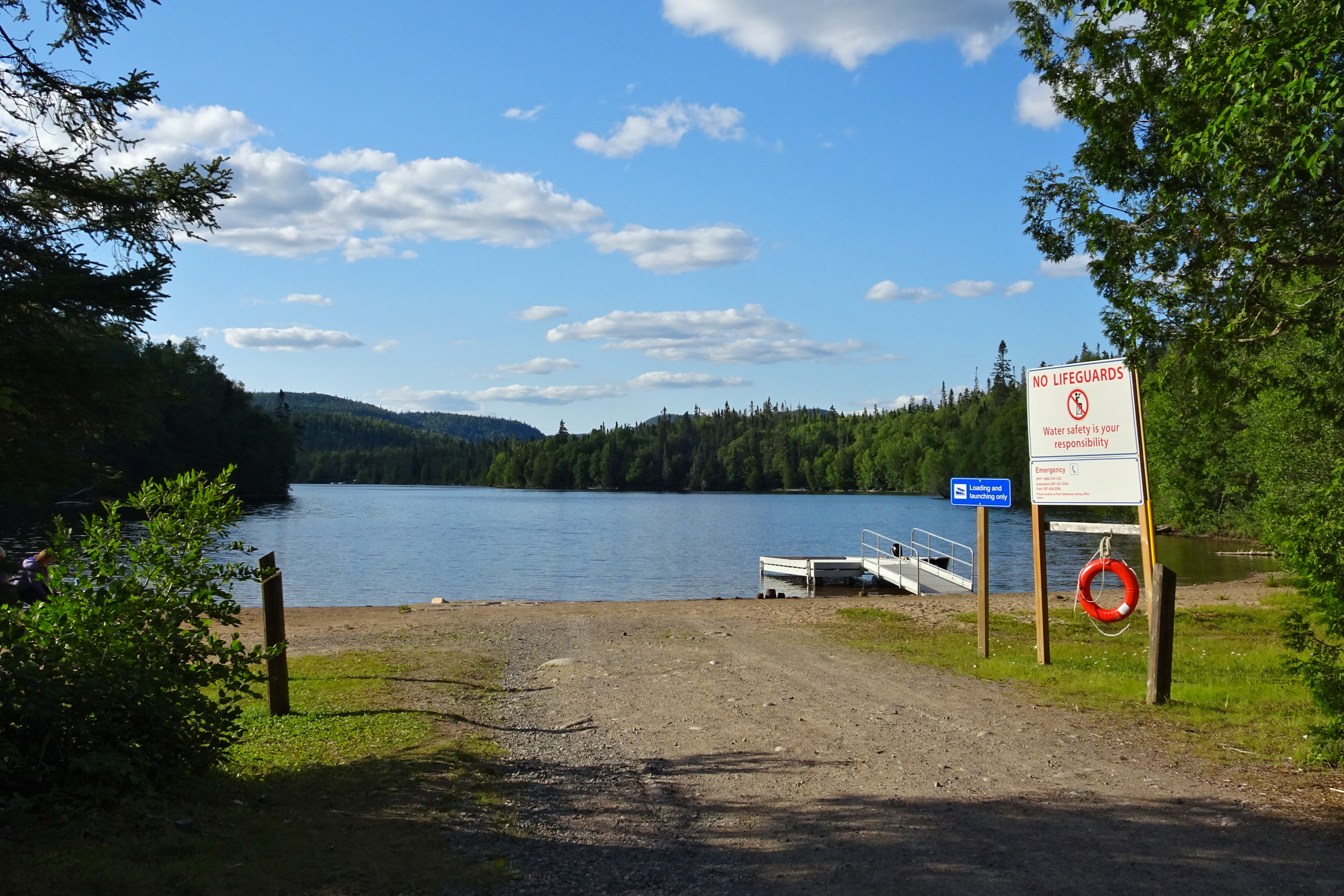
- Whitesand Lake in Rainbow Falls Provincial Park

- Location within Ontario
- Location: Thunder Bay District, Ontario, Canada
- Coordinates: 48°51′10″N 87°22′52″W
- Primary inflows: Whitesand River
- Primary outflows: Hewitson River
- Basin countries: Canada
- Max. length: 4 km (2.5 mi)
- Max. width: 1.7 km (1.1 mi)
- Surface elevation: 283 m (928 ft)

Whitesand Lake is a lake in Thunder Bay District, Ontario, Canada, part of the Hewitson River system.

Whitesand Lake is just north of Highway 17, about 9 kilometres (6 mi) east of the community of Rossport and 8 kilometres (5 mi) west of the community of Schreiber. The lake is about 4 kilometres (2 mi) long at its longest, and 1.7 kilometres (1.1 mi) at its widest. It is shaped roughly like the letter "H", with an elongated and fatter lower right arm. The primary inflow is the Whitesand River at the north side of the lake, and the lake flows out at the south-west via the Hewitson River over the Rainbow Falls into Lake Superior.

== Economy ==
A campground of Rainbow Falls Provincial Park is on the south side of Whitesand Lake near the outflow to the Hewitson River.
