= Whitesand River (Hewitson River tributary) =

- Location of the mouth of the river in Ontario

Location
- Country: Canada
- Province: Ontario
- Region: Northwestern Ontario
- District: Thunder Bay
- Part: Unorganized Part

Physical characteristics
- Source: North Whitesand Lake
  - coordinates: 48°59′01″N 87°20′14″W
  - elevation: 512 m (1,680 ft)
- Mouth: Whitesand Lake
  - coordinates: 48°51′42″N 87°22′55″W
  - elevation: 284 m (932 ft)
- Length: 22 km (14 mi)

Basin features
- River system: Hewitson River
- Tributaries
  - left: Ross Creek

The Whitesand River is a river in the Unorganized Part of Thunder Bay District in Northwestern Ontario, Canada, part of the Hewitson River system.

== Course ==
The river begins at North Whitesand Lake at an elevation of 512 metres (1,680 ft). The lake travels west, then turns south near the site of a mine. The Whitesand River then travels downstream via a series of lakes, including Cleaver Lake, Zenith Lake, Demijohn Lake, Gumboot Lake, Longcanoe Lake and Hornblende Lake. It then takes in its left tributary Ross Creek at Lyne Lake at 48°53′17″N 87°21′14″W at an elevation of 295 metres (968 ft), and reaches its mouth at Whitesand Lake at an elevation of 284 metres (932 ft) just north of Ontario Highway 17. The mouth is about 8 kilometres (5 mi) east northeast of the community of Rossport and 10 kilometres (6 mi) northwest of the community of Schreiber. The Whitesand River's waters flow from Whitesand Lake via the Hewitson River over the Rainbow Falls into Lake Superior.

== Economy ==
An access road to the mine runs from Highway 17 along the river. A campground of Rainbow Falls Provincial Park is on the south side of Whitesand Lake opposite the mouth of the Whitesand River.

== See also ==
- List of rivers of Ontario
