= Winston Lake (Thunder Bay District) =

Lake in Thunder Bay District, Ontario, Canada

- Location within Ontario Location within Canada
- Location: Thunder Bay District, Ontario
- Coordinates: 48°59′14″N 87°24′19″W
- Primary outflows: Winston Creek
- Basin countries: Canada
- Max. length: 4 km (2.5 mi)
- Max. width: .5 km (0.31 mi)
- Surface elevation: 396 m (1,299 ft)

Winston Lake is a lake in Thunder Bay District, Ontario, Canada. It is about 4 kilometres (2.5 mi) long and .5 kilometres (0.3 mi) wide, and lies at an elevation of 396 metres (1,299 ft) about 21.1 kilometres (13.1 mi) northwest of the community of Schreiber. The primary outflow is Winston Creek, part of the Pays Plat river system, which flows downstream through an unnamed lake to Banana Lake.
