= Winston Creek (Kenora District) =

- Location of the mouth of Winston Creek in Ontario

Location
- Country: Canada
- Province: Ontario
- Region: Northwestern Ontario
- District: Kenora
- Unorganized Part: Unorganized Kenora

Physical characteristics
- Source: Winston Lake
  - coordinates: 50°38′13″N 91°58′50″W
  - elevation: 379 m (1,243 ft)
- Mouth: Lac Seul
  - coordinates: 50°39′34″N 91°51′30″W
  - elevation: 351 m (1,152 ft)
- Length: 11 km (6.8 mi)

Basin features
- River system: Hudson Bay drainage basin
- CGNDB key: FDELC

Winston Creek is a stream in Kenora District, Ontario, Canada. It rises at Winston Lake at an elevation of 379 metres (1,243 ft) and travels 11 kilometres (6.8 mi) before emptying into Coones Bay at the northeast end of Lac Seul at an elevation of 351 metres (1,152 ft). Thus, Winston Creek is in the Hudson Bay drainage basin.

== See also ==
- List of rivers of Ontario
