= Demijohn Lake =

Lake in Ontario, Canada

- Location within Ontario
- Location: Thunder Bay District, Ontario
- Coordinates: 48°57′29″N 87°22′18″W
- Primary inflows: Whitesand River
- Primary outflows: Whitesand River
- Basin countries: Canada
- Max. length: .75 km (0.47 mi)
- Max. width: .1 km (0.062 mi)
- Surface elevation: 390 m (1,280 ft)

Demijohn Lake is a J-shaped lake in Thunder Bay District, Ontario, Canada. It is about 750 metres (2,461 ft) long and 100 metres (328 ft) wide, and lies at an elevation of 390 metres (1,280 ft). The primary inflow and outflow is the Whitesand River.
