= Winston Lake (Kenora District) =

Lake in Kenora District, Ontario, Canada

- Location in Ontario
- Location: Kenora District, Ontario
- Coordinates: 50°37′58″N 91°58′52″W
- Part of: Hudson Bay drainage basin
- Primary outflows: Winston Creek
- Basin countries: Canada
- Max. length: 900 m (3,000 ft)
- Max. width: 470 m (1,540 ft)
- Surface area: 42.3 ha (105 acres)
- Surface elevation: 379 m (1,243 ft)

Winston Lake is a lake in the Unorganized Part of Kenora District in Northwestern Ontario, Canada. It is about 900 metres (2,953 ft) long and 470 metres (1,542 ft) wide and has an area of 42.3 hectares (105 acres), and lies at an elevation of 379 metres (1,243 ft) about 60 kilometres (37 mi) north of the community of Sioux Lookout. The primary inflow is an unnamed creek from Shea Lake, and the primary outflow is Winston Creek, which flows into Lac Seul. The lake is thus in the Hudson Bay drainage basin.

== See also ==
- List of lakes in Ontario
