= Winston Creek (Thunder Bay District) =

Location
- Country: Canada
- Province: Ontario
- District: Thunder Bay

Physical characteristics
- Source: Winston Lake
  - coordinates: 48°58′05″N 87°24′35″W
  - elevation: 396 m (1,299 ft)
- Mouth: Unnamed Lake on the Pays Plat River
  - coordinates: 48°57′51″N 87°28′22″W
  - elevation: 283 m (928 ft)
- Length: 7 km (4.3 mi)

Winston Creek is a river in Thunder Bay District, Ontario, Canada. It rises at Winston Lake at an elevation of 396 metres (1,299 ft) and travels southwest 3.6 kilometres (2.2 mi) through Banana Lake to Triangle Lake, then northwest 3.4 kilometres (2.1 mi) before emptying into an unnamed lake on the Pays Plat River at an elevation of 283 metres (928 ft). The total length of the river is thus 7 kilometres (4 mi).

== See also ==
- List of rivers of Ontario
