= Hornblende Lake =

Lake in Ontario, Canada

- Location within Ontario
- Location: Thunder Bay District, Ontario
- Coordinates: 48°54′51″N 87°22′47″W
- Primary inflows: Whitesand River
- Primary outflows: Whitesand River
- Basin countries: Canada
- Max. length: 1.1 km (0.68 mi)
- Max. width: 0.4 km (0.25 mi)
- Surface elevation: 330 m (1,080 ft)

Hornblende Lake is a lake in Thunder Bay District, Ontario, Canada. It is about 1,100 metres (3,609 ft) long and 400 metres (1,312 ft) wide, and lies at an elevation of 330 metres (1,083 ft). The primary inflow is the Whitesand River flowing downstream from Longcanoe Lake, and the primary outflow is also the Whitesand River, which flows downstream into Lyne Lake.
