= Hewitson River =

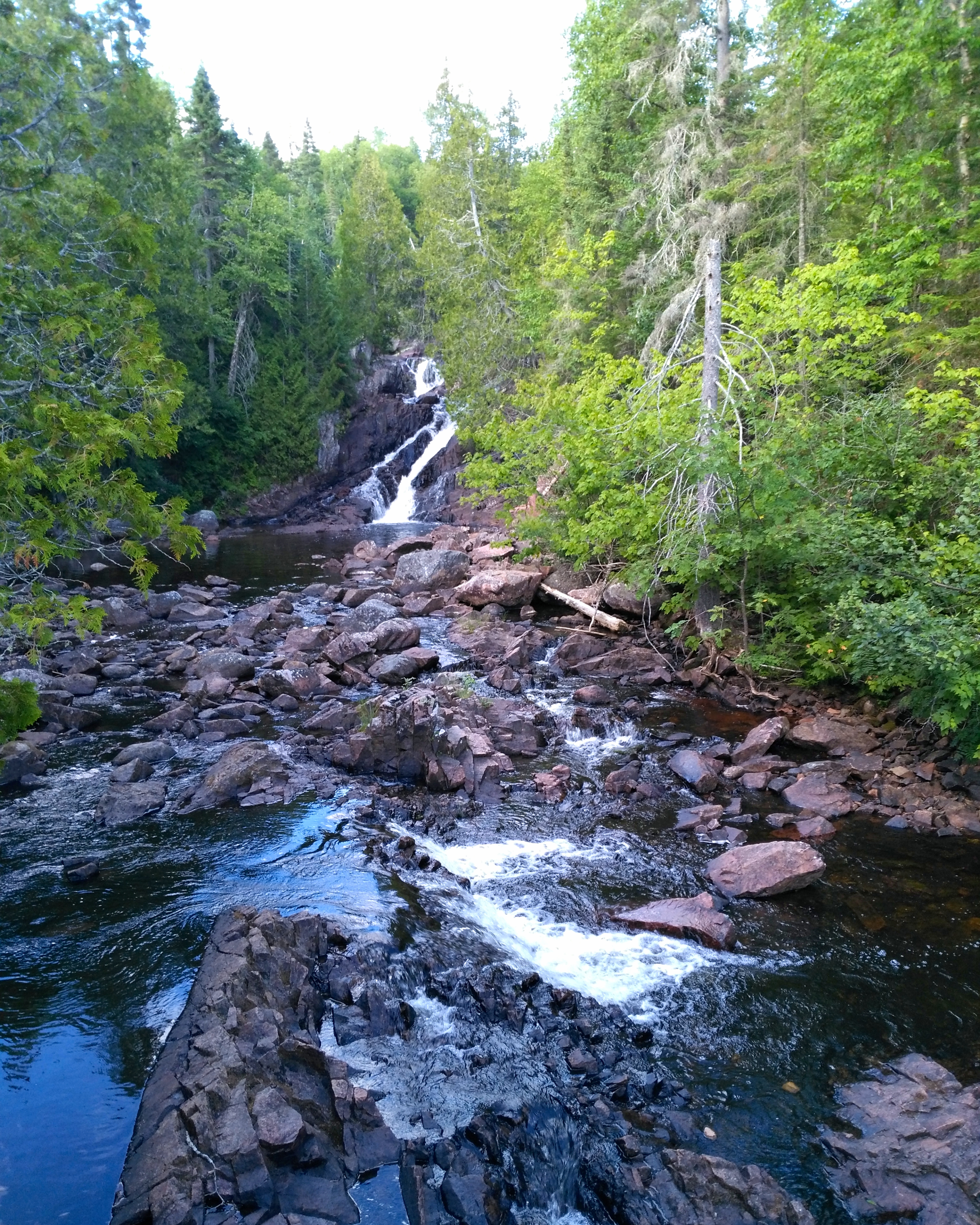
- Rainbow Falls on the Hewitson River

- Location of the mouth of the Hewitson River in Ontario

Location
- Country: Canada
- Province: Ontario
- District: Thunder Bay

Physical characteristics
- Source: Whitesand Lake
  - coordinates: 48°50′48″N 87°23′54″W
  - elevation: 283 m (928 ft)
- Mouth: Lake Superior
  - coordinates: 48°50′07″N 87°24′35″W
  - elevation: 180 m (590 ft)
- Length: 2.3 km (1.4 mi)

Basin features
- River system: Lake Superior

The Hewitson River is a short river in Thunder Bay District, northwestern Ontario, Canada. When the Canadian Pacific Railway was being constructed along the north shore of Lake Superior 1882–1885, the river was known as Maggot River.

== Course ==
The river begins at Whitesand Lake and flows over a series of falls, called the Rainbow Falls, then is crossed by Highway 17, and finally flows into Lake Superior. The mouth is about 8 kilometres (5 mi) east of the community of Rossport and 10 kilometres (6 mi) west of the community of Schreiber

== Economy ==
Several campgrounds of Rainbow Falls Provincial Park lie astride the river.

== See also ==
- List of rivers of Ontario
