= Rossport, Ontario =

Rossport
- Unincorporated community
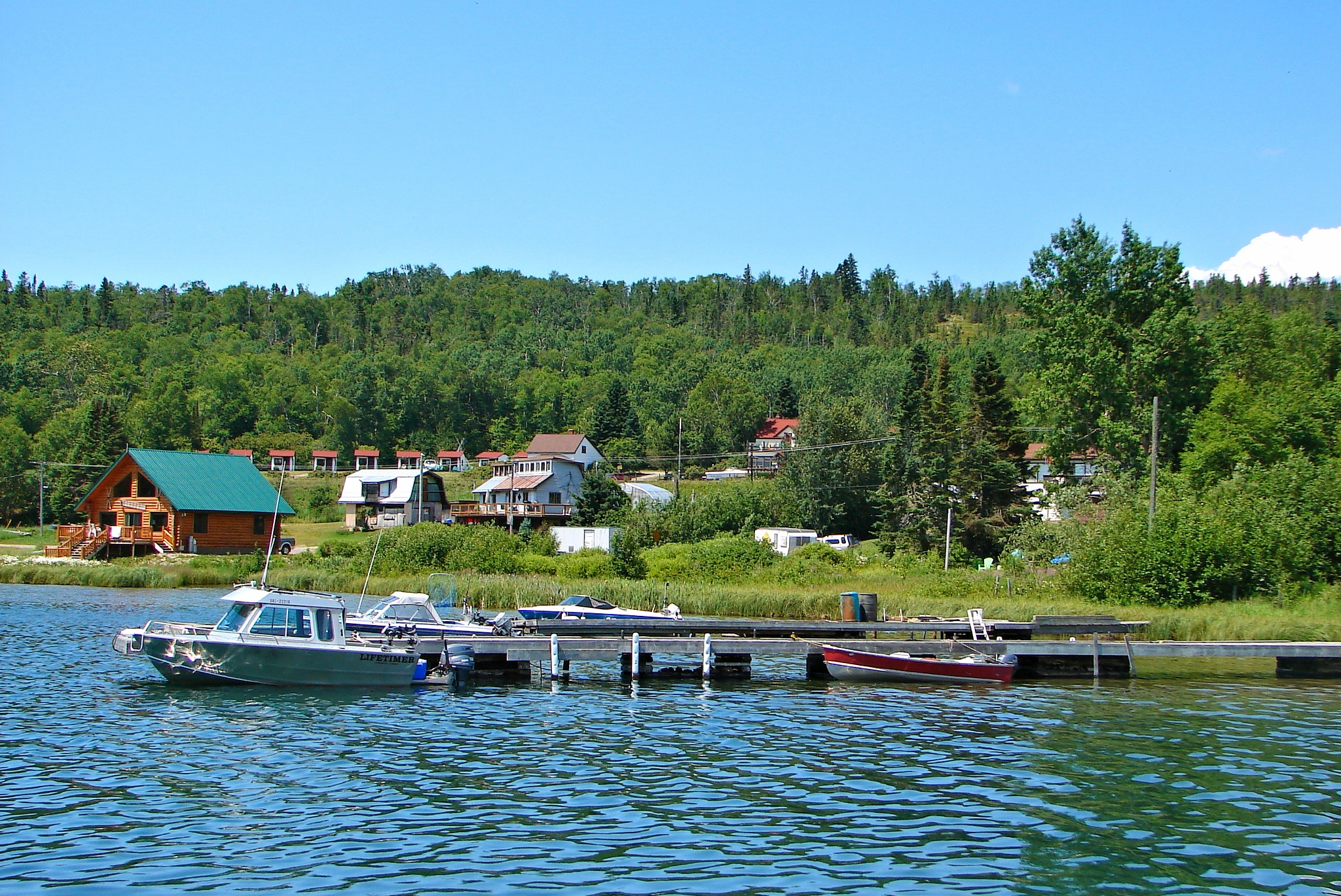

- Location of Rossport in Ontario
- Coordinates: 48°50′09″N 87°31′14″W
- Country: Canada
- Province: Ontario
- District: Thunder Bay

Area
  - Total: 1.12 km^{2} (0.43 sq mi)
- Elevation: 192 m (630 ft)

Population (2011)
  - Total: 65
  - Density: 58/km^{2} (150/sq mi)
- Time zone: UTC-5 (Eastern Time Zone)
  - Summer (DST): UTC-4 (Eastern Time Zone)
- Postal code: P0T 2R0
- Area code: 807

Rossport is a dispersed rural community and unincorporated place in the Unorganized part of Thunder Bay District in northwestern Ontario, Canada. It is on the north shore of Lake Superior in geographic Lahontan Township, and is on Ontario Highway 17. Rossport is a designated place served by a local services board, and has a population of 65.

== History ==
Rossport is named after John Ross (c1820-1898), construction manager for the north shore of Lake Superior route of the Canadian Pacific Railway (CPR) from August 1882 to June 1885. His construction headquarters during that time period were in Port Arthur, Ontario and at Rossport, then known as McKay's Harbour.

McKay's Harbour was named after Alexander McKay who operated a small fur trading post at Pays Plat and his son, Charles McKay, who was a lighthouse keeper at nearby Battle Island from 1878-1913.

Tiny Rossport garnered a wide reputation for being a source of prime fish. Although control of a fishery at nearby Pays Play Bay continued to rest with the Hudson's Bay Company, the late 1860's and 1870's saw independent fishermen arrive from the south to establish scattered camps on the islands south of Nipigon Bay. Prior to construction of the CPR, it was not unusual for steamers such as the "Algoma" to dock only twice a year at remote stations.

Leaving Toronto in 1881, George Gerow came with his family to Bowman Island station and commenced fishing for the John Leckie Co. of Toronto. Around this time, Atanos "Harry" Legault, accompanied by three other fishermen, established an island base at a site called Frenchmens Harbour (south of St. Ignace Harbour). Soon as many as 18 fishermen had joined the resident miners of busy Chummy Harbour (Salter Is.) depot. Department of Marine and Fisheries reports record additional fishing stations at Wilson Island (1877), Copper Island (1884 to 1886) and Simpson Island (1877, 1883).

After the end of CPR construction in 1885, Rossport became an important commercial fishing centre. Bowman Street is named after John Bowman (1858–1950) who operated a fishing company there. An article in the Dominion Illustrated from October 1888, speaks of how dealers from Eastern Canada had travelled to Rossport and other North Shore communities in order to contract for Lake Superior’s fine freshwater fish. Another article from November 1888 talks of a trial shipment of ten barrels of fish from Rossport being sent to Belfast Ireland, where it was quickly sold.

More settlers arrived to make Rossport station their permanent home. William Mallot established a small fish company and store. In 1889 the American A. Booth Packing Co., represented by the Port Arthur Fish Company, erected a fish house and began to engage in tactics designed to force inroads further into the local industry, including that of the recently established Rossport Fish Company managed by Mr. Ashforth (a former Booth employee). The 1893 population of Rossport was 100 people, and at the turn of the century there were 18 fishing licenses registered at Rossport and 9 at St. Ignace Harbour.

Establishment of several small independent firms in the 1890s in part thwarted Booth attempts at west-end monopolization. Fisherman John Bowman from 1894 acted as a local buyer, expanded his business to Port Arthur after 1900, and in 1918 entered the fisheries on Lake Nipigon. Thomas Craigie began fishing at Nipigon in 1895, moved to Rossport the following year, opened a fish store in Fort William in 1910, and in 1916 formed the Fort William Fish Company.

J.A. Nicol, a former CPR employee at Heron Bay, became Rossport station master in 1896, erecting a small ice house and entering the fishing industry initially as a buyer. Around 1908 he built two large waterfront buildings, acquired the license rights of many members of the Rossport fishermen's cooperative, and built his Nipigon Bay Fish Company into one of the major enterprises along the north shore, actively competing with Booth. However, a few men chose to fish independently; among these John Paulmart and his sons (James, Steven and Robert) ran a packing house from 1915 into the 1940's and shipped fish as the Independent Fish Company. In 1916 there were at least 22 fishermen at Rossport with 7 steam tugs.

By 1940 the Nipigon Bay Fish Co. was shipping a boxcar load of fresh fish daily, drawing on the produce of stations as far away as Magnet Point. After J.A. Nicol's death, his son Maurice continued to manage the company until its closure in 1953. In 1958 its buildings were destroyed by fire.

In 1901, Rossport joined other North Shore port communities in becoming a regular stop for steamships belonging to Francis Clergue. The vessels operated between Sault Ste Marie and Port Arthur.

In 1907, tenders were called by the Dominion Public Works Department for the construction of a wharf at Rossport.

Most interesting is how a small local competition in 1937 morphed into an international event. There was a time when the Rossport Fish Derby was a staple on every sports fisherman's calendar. An August 1952 article in the Toronto Star describes over 4000 people attending that year’s self-proclaimed “greatest amateur fishing event in North America”. Cars, tents and people would be visible along the highway for a distance as participants arrived and staked out a piece of land to camp on for the one-day event. The arrival to the lake of a non-native species, the sea lamprey, caused devastation to the lake trout population and, over time, brought about the downfall to the days of the derby.

In 1911 the luxury steam yacht Gunilda, owned by William L. Harkness, foundered on the McGarvey Shoal and sank 8 kilometres from Rossport. The actual date of the sinking varies from August 11 to August 29 to August 31st depending upon the article. A Toronto Daily Star news item contained in the Friday, September 1, 1911 edition states that the vessel ran aground on Wednesday, which would be August 30, and then refers to the sinking as occurring "yesterday" or August 31, 1911. This timeframe could reflect accuracy as after the vessel ran aground on the shoal and stabilized, a small boat was sent to Rossport where arrangements were made for the dispatch of a rescue tug from Port Arthur. It would take time for that tug to travel to Rossport. Therefore there would be a difference in the time between when the Gunilda ran aground and when it was actually pulled off the shoal only to sink.

Painters from the Group of Seven (artists) visited Rossport and the surrounding area several times in the 1920s. In 2018, a plaque was installed in Wardrop Park celebrating their visits and Lawren Harris' painting "Rossport, Lake Superior - 1921" as part of the Moments of Algoma tourism initiative.

On October 3, 1933, Rossport's waterfront suffered great damage as a result of an unusual tidal phenomenon with Lake Superior.

== Demographics ==
In the 2021 Census of Population conducted by Statistics Canada, Rossport had a population of 96 living in 43 of its 68 total private dwellings, a change of 47.7% from its 2016 population of 65. With a land area of 1.15 km^{2} (0.44 sq mi), it had a population density of 83.5/km^{2} (216.2/sq mi) in 2021.

Canada census – Rossport, Ontario community profile

	2011
Population	65 (-1.5% from 2006)
Land area	1.12 km^{2} (0.43 sq mi)
Population density	58.2/km^{2} (151/sq mi)
Median age	54.1 (M: 54.5, F: 52.5)
Private dwellings	69 (total)
Median household income

References: 2011

Rossport had a population of 66 in the Canada 2006 Census, a decrease of 41.1% since 2001, but only dropped to 65 persons in the 2011 census.

== Local government ==
Rossport is managed by a local services board. Rossport has a water treatment plant which serves 45 households. The hamlet falls within the provincial and federal ridings of Thunder Bay-Superior North.

== Recreation and Environment ==
The Lake Superior National Marine Conservation Area, which includes the waters off Rossport, was created by Parks Canada on June 24, 2015.

In 2009, an eight-island archipelago just off Rossport, including Wilson Island, was purchased from private owners and was to become a Canadian federal natural area under a joint deal backed by the Nature Conservancy of Canada, the Government of Canada and the Government of Ontario, and supported by the Pays Plat First Nation.

The Voyageur Hiking Trail passes through the town.
