= Schreiber, Ontario =

Schreiber
- Township (single-tier)
- Township of Schreiber
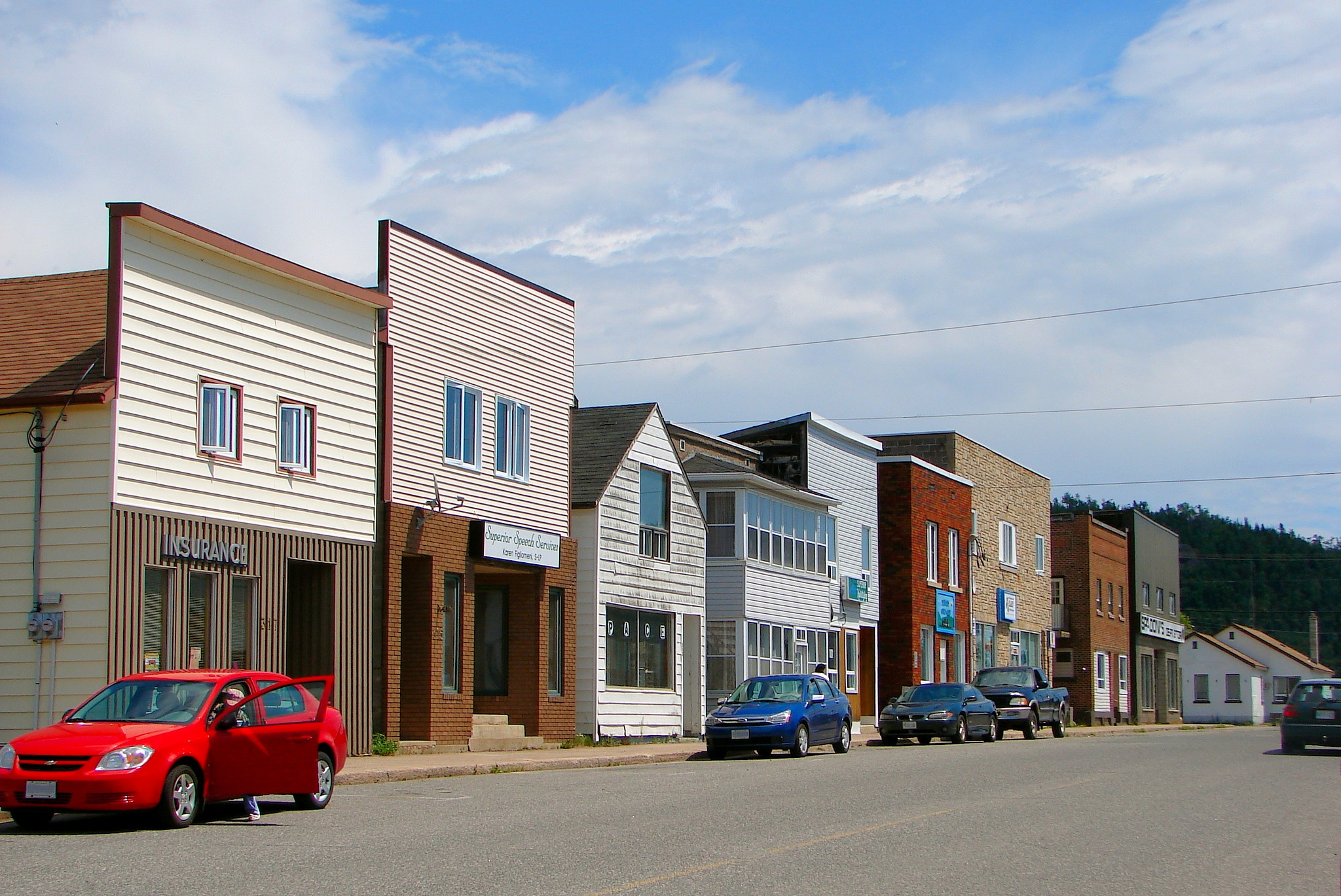

- Location within Ontario
- Coordinates: 48°49′N 87°16′W
- Country: Canada
- Province: Ontario
- District: Thunder Bay
- Settled: 1883
- Incorporated: 1901
- Named for: Sir Collingwood Schreiber

Government
  - Mayor: Kevin Mullins
  - Fed. riding: Thunder Bay—Superior North
  - Prov. riding: Thunder Bay—Superior North

Area
  - Land: 35.81 km^{2} (13.83 sq mi)

Population (2021)
  - Total: 1,059
  - Density: 28.8/km^{2} (75/sq mi)
- Time zone: UTC−05:00 (EST)
  - Summer (DST): UTC−04:00 (EDT)
- Postal Code: P0T 2S0
- Area code: 807
- Website: www.schreiber.ca

Schreiber is a municipal township in the Canadian province of Ontario, located on the northernmost point of Lake Superior along Highway 17.

The town was named after Sir Collingwood Schreiber, a railway engineer, founding member of the Canadian Society of Civil Engineers and deputy minister of Railways and Canals from 1892 to 1905.

The town is near the main exposure of the Gunflint chert, which contains rare single-celled Proterozoic fossils.

Passing close to the town is the Casques Isles Trail, a dream of Schreiber-born outdoorsman Tom McGrath. This scenic pathway along Lake Superior now forms part of the Voyageur Hiking Trail.

== Geography ==
Schreiber is almost completely located inside the geographic township of Priske, with a small western portion of the town in the southeast of Killraine Township.

Northwestern Ontario, including Schreiber, is part of the large rocky area defined as the Canadian Shield.

Schreiber sits in the midst of these very hard rocks. Schreiber could be described as residing in the bottom of a three sided bowl. The town is surrounded by higher terrain on the west, north and east sides while the south is open and shows the descent to Lake Superior. There is a break on the north side of this rocky crown which opens to reveal an expanse of flat land. This break also acts as a channel for northerly winds, allowing these winds to be funnelled into the town proper, creating very blustery conditions especially in winter.

Schreiber, despite being in a bowl, sits higher than the surrounding area. The village of Rossport, sitting on Lake Superior, 14 mi (23 km) to the west, has an elevation of 630 ft (190 m) above sea level. Jackfish, the historic townsite to the east, also sits at 630 ft (190 m) above sea level. Terrace Bay, situated between Schreiber and Jackfish, is located at 889 ft (271 m) feet above sea level. Schreiber itself, at its centre, is shown as being at 988 ft (301 m) above sea level.

=== Climate ===
Schreiber's weather is influenced by the flow of cooler air from the northwest and the presence of Lake Superior. The Lake acts as a temperature moderator, providing milder winters but cooler summers.

Climate Ontario describes Schreiber's climate, according to the Koppen classification, as the humid microthermal climate, Dfb (humid continental, cool summer, no dry season).

== History ==
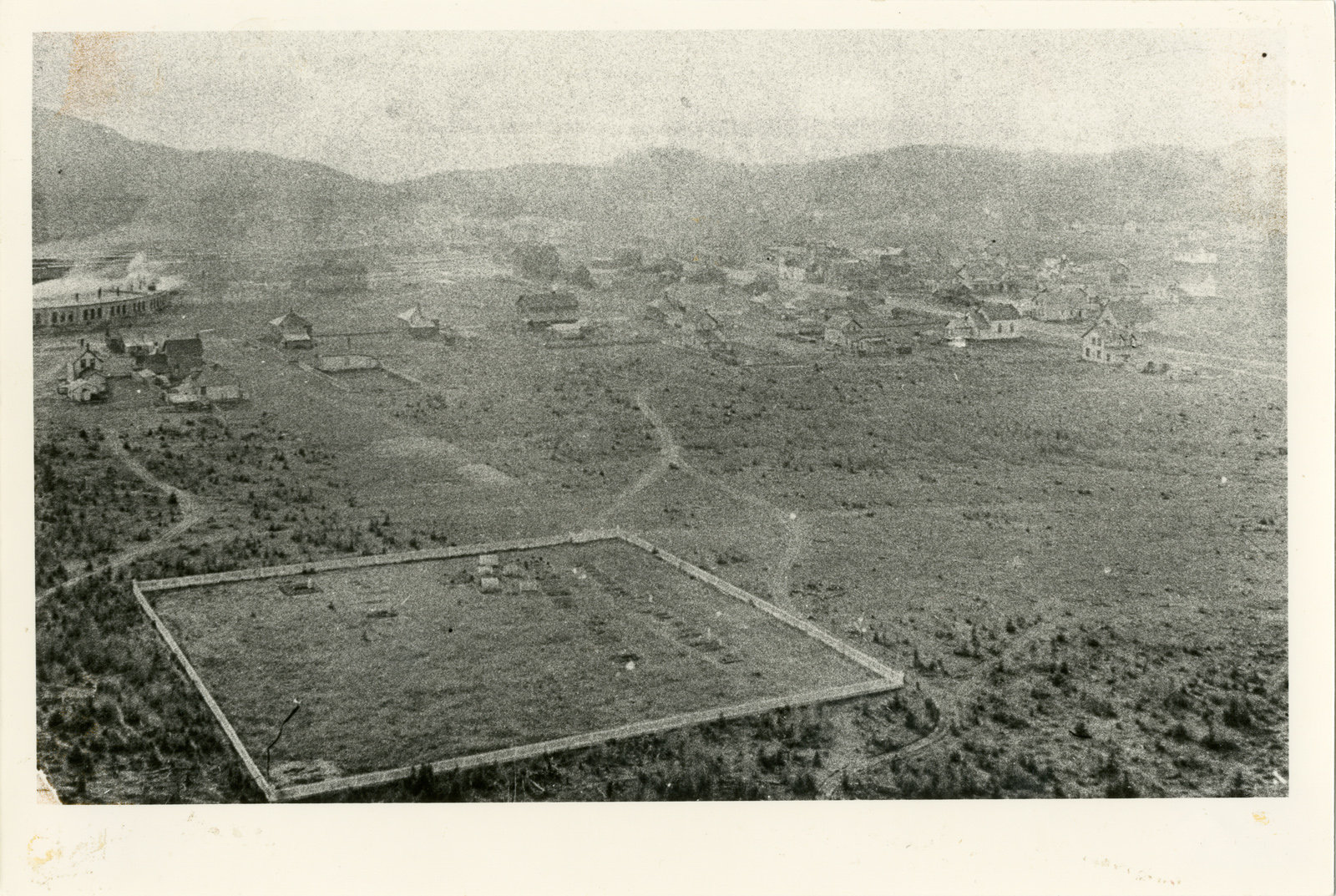
Aerial view of Schreiber from the 1890s

The settlement was founded in 1883 as a construction camp for the Canadian Pacific Railway (CPR). Steamships loaded with supplies for building the railway would dock at what was then known as "Isbester's Landing", named for railway contractor James Isbester, who in partnership with Robert Gillespie Reid was responsible for building many of the railway bridges along the north shore of Lake Superior. Isbester's Landing grew from a construction camp to a railway divisional point. A station, roundhouse, car shops, icehouse and stock yard soon followed.

The town was renamed Schreiber in 1885. On July 13, 1901, the township was officially incorporated. The CPR moved the divisional office from White River to Schreiber in 1912, and thereafter remained as one of the town's biggest employers. The town's economy is also sustained by a pulp mill in Terrace Bay, which is located 15 minutes away.

During World War II, Schreiber was the site of one of the four work camps established for Japanese-Canadian internees. Several prisoner of war camps for Axis soldiers, sailors and air force personnel were also built nearby.

Many immigrants soon came to Schreiber, with a large proportion finding jobs on the railway. A large percentage of these immigrants were from Italy, particularly from Siderno. Many others came from Poland, Finland, Scotland, Ireland, and other countries in Europe, as well as other parts of Canada.

== Demographics ==
In the 2021 Census of Population conducted by Statistics Canada, Schreiber had a population of 1,039 living in 516 of its 612 total private dwellings, a change of −1.9% from its 2016 population of 1,059. With a land area of 35.81 km^{2} (13.83 sq mi), it had a population density of 29.0/km^{2} (75.1/sq mi) in 2021.

Canada census – Schreiber, Ontario community profile

	2021	2016	2011
Population	1,039 (-1.9% from 2016)	1,059 (-6.0% from 2011)	1,126 (+25.0% from 2006)
Land area	35.81 km^{2} (13.83 sq mi)	36.80 km^{2} (14.21 sq mi)	36.79 km^{2} (14.20 sq mi)
Population density	29.0/km^{2} (75/sq mi)	28.8/km^{2} (75/sq mi)	30.6/km^{2} (79/sq mi)
Median age	54.4 (M: 54.0, F: 54.4)	50.4 (M: 50.5, F: 50.4)
Private dwellings	612 (total) 516 (occupied)	628 (total)	643 (total)
Median household income	$75,500	$70,528

References: 2021 2016 2011

Historical census populations – Schreiber, Ontario

Year	Pop.	±%
1891	418	—
1901	510	+22.0%
1911	1,140	+123.5%
1921	1,317	+15.5%
1931	1,268	−3.7%
1941	1,281	+1.0%
1951	1,939	+51.4%

Year	Pop.	±%
1956	2,050	+5.7%
1961	2,230	+8.8%
1966	2,188	−1.9%
1971	2,089	−4.5%
1976	2,010	−3.8%
1981	1,968	−2.1%
1986	1,944	−1.2%

Year	Pop.	±%
1991	1,903	−2.1%
1996	1,788	−6.0%
2001	1,448	−19.0%
2006	901	−37.8%
2011	1,126	+25.0%
2016	1,059	−6.0%
2021	1,039	−1.9%

Population counts are not adjusted for boundary changes.
Source: Statistics Canada

== Transportation ==
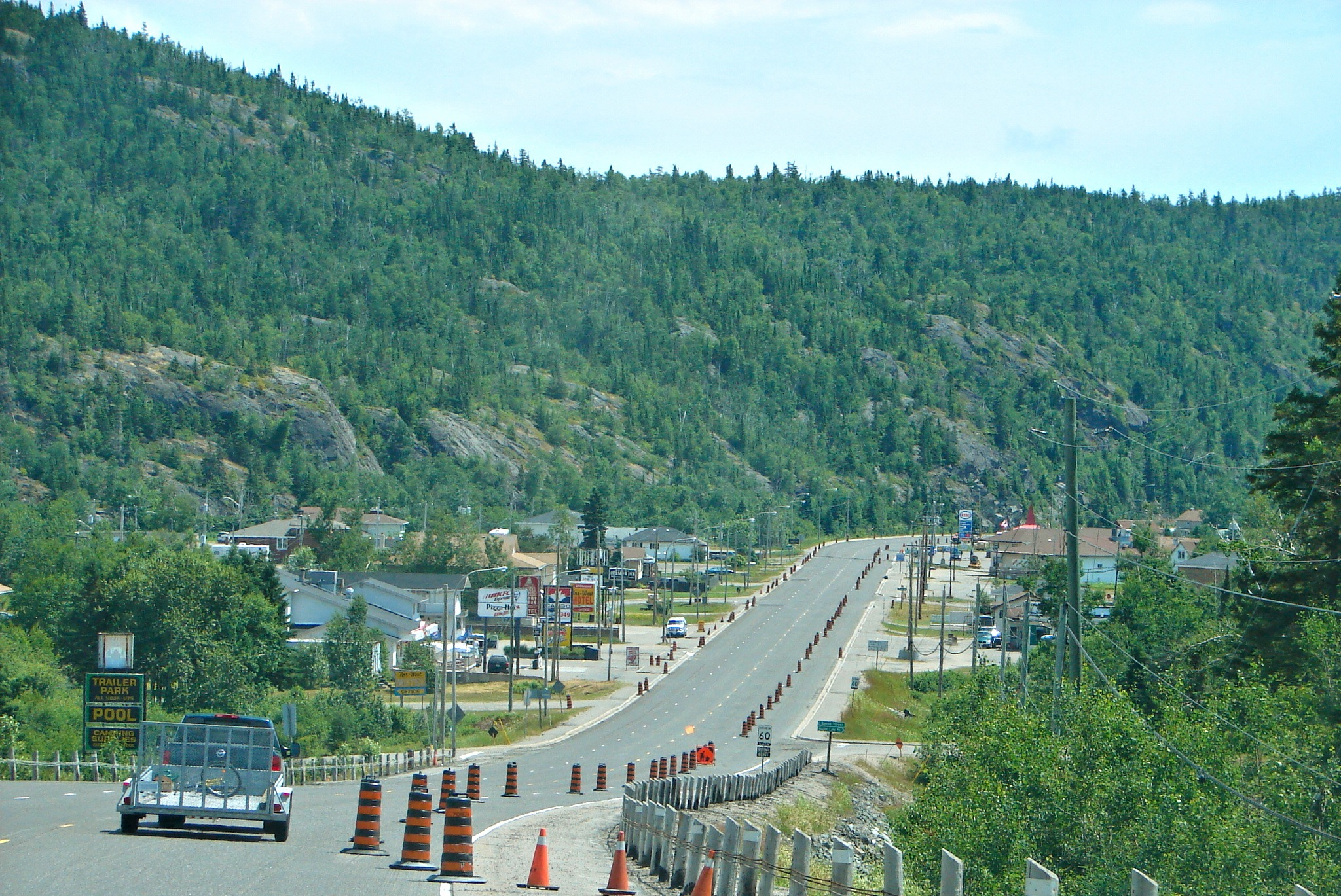
Highway 17 through Schreiber

Marathon has Ontario Northland motor coach service on its Sault Ste. Marie–Thunder Bay route.

=== The railway ===
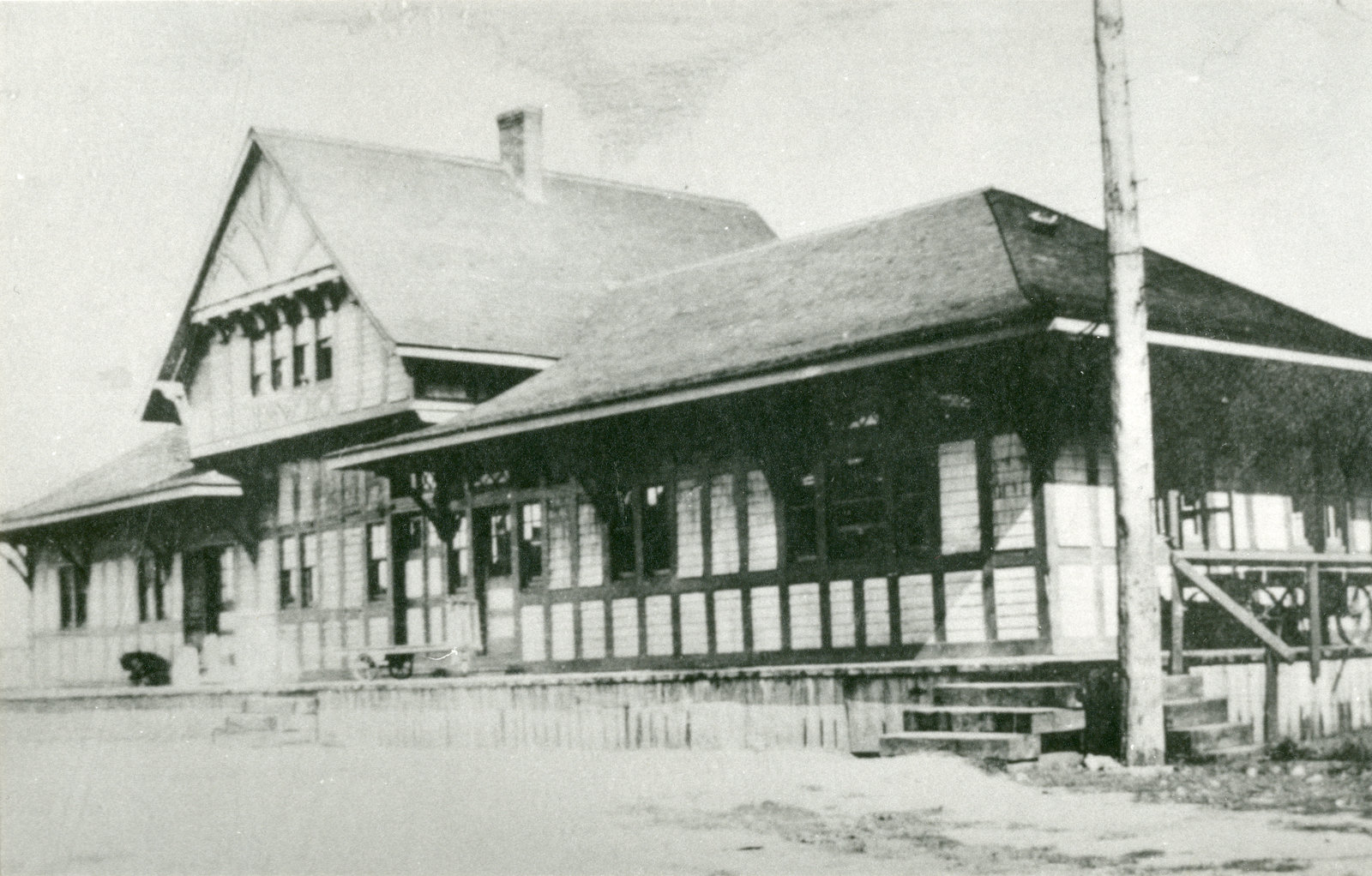
The old CPR station in Schreiber c. 1884.

Schreiber's birth and continued existence is based on the Canadian Pacific Railway. Schreiber has gone through several iterations.

A railway home terminal could be described as the specified location at which train crews are domiciled. The Away-From-Home terminal could be described as the objective terminal for a train crew. Schreiber was, and remains, a home terminal train crew change point for the railway. As such, a portion of its populace is trained and employed to operate the trains from Schreiber in both directions: westward on the Nipigon Subdivision to Thunder Bay, the next train crew change-off point, or eastward on the Heron Bay Subdivision to the change-off terminal of White River, Ontario. This status of being a home terminal for train crews ensures the township of a number of high-quality skilled jobs.

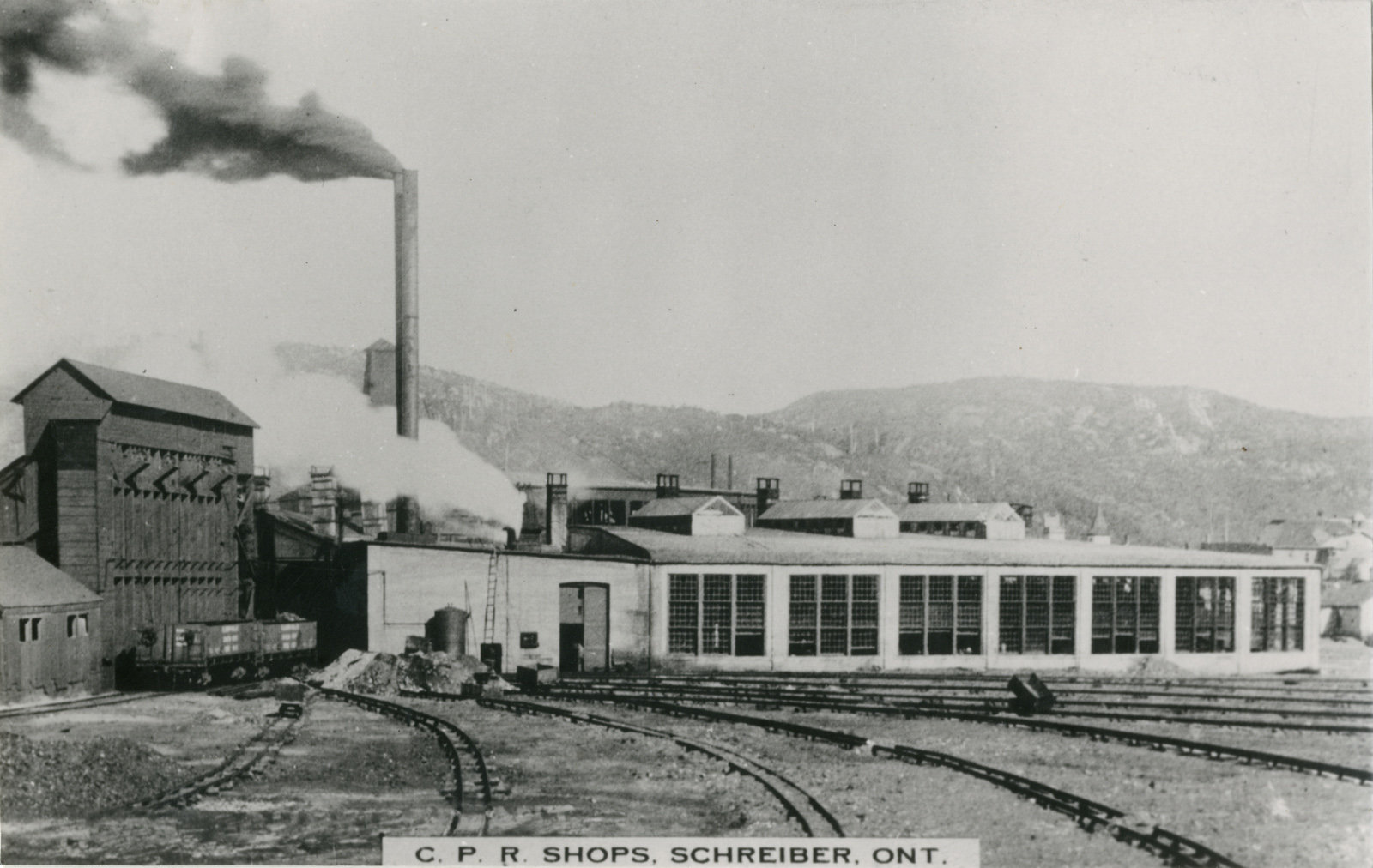
The CPR shops in 1930.

The railway attracted to the township, and employed people for many occupations including track maintenance, signal maintenance, telecommunications, mechanical and locomotive maintenance, yard operation, radio communication, engineering and administration. The railway built and maintained homes in Schreiber for its supervisory and trades staff. The creation of a dedicated housing supply is attributable to the railway's policy of transferring their employees often. This constant movement of staff was a very common early practice within all railways, owing usually to the large territory combined with the limitations on travel and communications. Early transportation publications would contain numerous announcements of promotion and transfer of location.

By constructing and managing the properties in the smaller centres, the railway was able to ensure accommodations for its officials and their families. The rotating in-and-out of supervisors gave these people exposure to the CPR's various subdivisions, allowed them to experience the challenges that may be specific to those territories, and to meet and understand the needs of the local rail customers. Having housing available in a small centre such as Schreiber made such a transfer easier for the railways' incoming staff and their families.

The company housing was concentrated in two areas within Schreiber. The Canadian Pacific tracks and switching yard are located in the centre of the town and divide the town into two distinct zones. While there were CPR houses in various parts of the town, the primary concentration of these buildings was located along two streets. There was an alignment of CPR houses on Manitoba Street to the north of the CPR yard tracks. There was a similar collection of company houses located on Alberta Street. Alberta Street is located to the south side of the CPR tracks. Thus there was a somewhat even distribution of these dwellings on both sides of the rail yard.

The majority of the railway's supplied dwellings were large boxy duplexes. There were also some detached homes provided. These company buildings tended to be identical in construction materials and colours. CPR's Tuscan red colour was a mainstay in identifying company houses. The Tuscan red painted wood trim and complementary red insul-brick siding were common characteristics.

The in-resident Schreiber Division Superintendent was allocated a single detached house on the corner of Alberta and Erie Streets, two blocks from his office in the CPR station. The home was distinguished by the addition of pleasing architectural features not found on the standard company homes. The Superintendent's dwelling was surrounded by a well-tended lush lawn and colourful flowerbeds. The selected employee who maintained these grounds was also responsible for the lawn and flower beds at the CPR station. The well-kept station grounds were a local source of joy and pride and something especially enjoyed by the passengers of the passing trains. To complete the picture of an overall peaceful setting, the grassed grounds and flower beds on both sides of the CPR station were separated from the Brunswick Street roadway by wire fencing and a line of mountain ash trees. The value of any asset can be viewed differently depending upon the individual and the circumstances. At some point in the 1970-80's, the station landscaping feature was considered as a liability. The barrier fence was torn down, and the lawn was dug up and removed. The green grass was replaced with a packable material and the area became an employee parking lot which now required little maintenance.

At its peak, the town was home and headquarters for Canadian Pacific's Schreiber Division superintendent, his management staff and the territory's dispatching office. Schreiber, with a population of approximately 2,000 people, was the smallest location on the CPR's rail line to be the designated home of a Divisional Superintendent and his dispatching office. This was not so much an issue when everyone used trains for travel. As time went on and air travel increased, this changed perspective. The fact that the closest airport was in Thunder Bay, approximately 120 mi (190 km) away, and that the lake-effect weather could make driving a concern, made corporate stopovers more challenging. On November 16, 1989, it was announced that the Schreiber and Sudbury Divisions would be amalgamated into one new territory, the Algoma Division, with one superintendent located in Sudbury overseeing the combined territory and its operations.

This organizational change served to resolve the issue of travel to a remote location for the railway, with Sudbury being more accessible for flights from Toronto and Montreal. The re-alignment of the superintendent's territory resulted in the supplied housing units in Schreiber to be left standing vacant. The houses were now deemed as being superfluous and sold-off to private individuals.

The news of this amalgamation was coupled with the announcement that Canadian Pacific would be implementing cabooseless train operation testing with the goal to eventually replace the manned caboose with an electronic device on all freight trains.

In 1992, the Canadian Pacific Railway dispatching offices in Schreiber and Sudbury Ontario were consolidated into the Toronto Dispatching office.

== Education ==
The town has always had a recognition of the value of education, as demonstrated by its long-standing history in building schools.

The town has two elementary schools: Schreiber Public School and Holy Angels Catholic School.

The first Schreiber Public School was built in 1903. The school was located at the northwest corner of Ontario and Winnipeg Streets. By 1912, overcrowding forced the addition of two more classrooms and an enlarged entranceway. The present Schreiber Public School building was constructed in 1956--again, with additions being added over the later years.

To ease overcrowding at the Schreiber Public School, in 1943, Schreiber's Catholic community undertook to create a separate school section. The Guild Hall, which stood next to the Catholic church, was reconfigured into classrooms. It was soon realized that a true separate school was needed and in 1949, Holy Angels Separate School was built. This new building consisted of four classrooms and a large lower area which could be converted into classrooms. Several additions were made over the years to handle a growing student population with the last major extension being built in 1966.

Although the public school was located on the north side of town, the separate school was built on the south side of town with the divider being the Canadian Pacific Railway tracks. Pedestrian and vehicular access to each side of the town is provided through an underpass.

Secondary school education in Schreiber was started in 1924 when provincial approval was received to commence the Schreiber Continuation School. Subsequently, a four-room annex was added to the existing Schreiber Public School. In 1958, the Continuation School received official High School status. An overflowing student population was resulting in the usage of several different spaces. This forced the township to negotiate with the Department of Education and, in 1962, provincial approval was given for the construction of a new building which would now be the Schreiber High School. The original Continuation/High school remained in use until 1963. The new and modern Schreiber High School building was constructed on the south side of town and officially opened on August 31, 1963. The original Continuation School was later demolished. In 1972, the existing Schreiber High School had been renamed as the Schreiber campus of the Lake Superior High School. The former Terrace Bay High School was renamed as the Terrace Bay campus of Lake Superior High School. In 2002, a decision was made that there would be one designated location to provide secondary education to the students of Schreiber, Terrace Bay and immediate area. That school would be located in Terrace Bay. The Schreiber campus was subsequently closed. The former Schreiber High School building was initially designated as the Schreiber Training Centre of Excellence. It has now been re-purposed as the Schreiber Municipal Complex and houses the Schreiber municipal offices. The Lake Superior High School in Terrace Bay accommodates all secondary school students from Terrace Bay, Schreiber and immediate surrounding communities.

== See also ==
- List of townships in Ontario
