= 2026 Canadian wildfires =

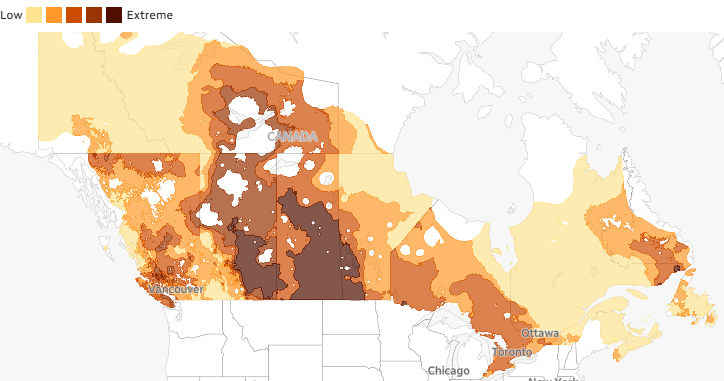
- Fire danger warnings across Canada as of May 29
- Date: January 2026 – October 15, 2026
- Location: Alberta; British Columbia; Yukon; Manitoba; Saskatchewan; New Brunswick; Newfoundland and Labrador; Quebec; Ontario; Northwest Territories; Nova Scotia

Statistics
- Total fires: 5,495 (as of September 29, 2026)
- Burned area: 4,500,000 ha (11,000,000 acres) (as of September 29, 2026)

Impacts
- Deaths: 5
- Injuries: 36+
- Evacuated: 33,750+

Map
- Perimeters of 2026 Canadian wildfires (map data)

The 2026 Canadian wildfire season began slowly but with high risks for fire throughout the country. Through June and July, the season accelerated, with more than 949 active wildfires across the country in mid-July, primarily in the Northwest Territories, Manitoba, British Columbia, Ontario, Quebec and Saskatchewan. Wildfires have been recorded in nine of ten provinces and all three territories.

Climate change has led to higher temperatures, drier conditions, and larger and longer-lasting fires in Canada. The country experienced a string of severe seasons in 2023 (its worst ever), 2024, and 2025 (its second-worst). The 2026 season was projected to be above historical averages, but not as severe as the preceding years, with British Columbia, Alberta, and the Northwest Territories facing the highest risk.

Fires in Northwestern Ontario created smoky conditions throughout North America, with Toronto having the worst air quality of any major city in the world on July 15. The smoke spread throughout Southern Ontario and into the United States and Mexico, triggering air quality alerts across the Northeastern U.S., and leading to a spike in emergency department hospitalizations in Ontario. A report from the United Nations University Institute for Water, Environment and Health found that nearly 106 million people were exposed to hazardous or unhealthy air in both Canada and the United States from July 15–17, including 19 million in a single day.

Five people were killed: four during firefighting operations and a woman by a wildfire in British Columbia. The largest wildfire is the Thunder Bay 36 in northwestern Ontario, which has burned 318,813 ha (787,800 acres) according to satellite data from the Wildland Fire Interagency Geospatial Service, making it one of the largest fires in Ontario's recorded history.

The wildfire season was declared over on October 15 in an updated report from the Canadian Government.

== Background ==
Climate change has made extreme wildfires more common, with the country experiencing severe seasons in 2023 (its worst ever by area burned), 2024, and 2025 (its second-worst). Fires have become larger, lasted longer, and are more difficult to extinguish. Because of its northerly latitude, Canada is warming faster than other parts of the planet; along with more frequent dry conditions, this has increased fire risk. Previous years have seen increased risk in all eco-zones in the country, including the Pacific Northwest and Atlantic Canada. The 2026 season was projected to be above-average, but not as destructive as 2023 or 2025. Government officials did not expect the strong El Niño to impact the season.

=== Preparations ===
In 2025, the federal government set aside $316 million over five years to support Canada's first national aerial firefighting fleet. For 2026, it leased ten aircraft from British Columbia companies: four airtankers, a birddog spotter plane, and five helicopters. Canadian and American wildfire fighters continued bilateral cooperation, though the U.S. Forest Service faced restructuring and a US$37 million budget cut.

== Wildfires ==
2026 Canadian wildfires by month (as of September 29)
	Jan	Feb	Mar	Apr	May	Jun	Jul	Aug	Sep	Oct	Nov	Dec	Total
Number of fires	—N/a			382	1,097	1,190	1,655	924	172	—N/a (Note: No data, as the September 29, 2026 report was the last CIFFC National Situation report for 2026.)			5,420
Area burned (Ha)	—N/a			2,088	76,043	598,456	3,107,098	708,598	-	—N/a			4,488,158

Wildfires by province or territory (as of September 29)
Province or territory	Number of Fires	Area burned	
Province or territory	Number of Fires	hectares	acres
British Columbia	1,481	479,463	1,184,780
Yukon	80	7,360	18,200
Alberta	763	17,766	43,900
Northwest Territories	290	1,694,212	4,186,490
Saskatchewan	340	303,295	749,460
Manitoba	315	264,244	652,960
Ontario	796	744,394	1,839,440
Quebec	651	753,935	1,863,010
Newfoundland and Labrador	131	96,301	237,960
New Brunswick	362	497	1,230
Nova Scotia	115	1,525	3,770
Prince Edward Island	8	4	9.9
Parks Canada	88	125,161	309,280
Total	5,420	4,488,158	11,100,670

=== Alberta ===
From January to February, three wildfires burned a total of 0.13 ha (0.32 acres) in the Edson Forest Area. In late May, the Grande Prairie Forest Area wildfire danger level remained high; 29 wildfires had ignited in the GPFA since the start of the year, burning 7 ha (17 acres). On May 28, Alberta Wildfire issued a fire advisory for the Fort McMurray Forest Area amid warm temperatures and increasingly dry vegetation across northeastern Alberta. No active wildfires were burning in the area at the time. At 17:42 on May 28, a critical Alberta Emergency Alert was sent out telling residents in Thunder Lake to evacuate immediately after structural fires south of the Provincial Park boat launch. The following day at 11:03, the wildfire alert was cancelled and the area was safe for re-entry. The county manager said 13 properties were impacted and six buildings were destroyed.

On May 29, Alberta Wildfires said there were two out of control wildfires burning roughly 20 kilometres (12 mi) south of Wembley, roughly 5 kilometres (3.1 mi) apart from each other. One fire burned about 1.5 ha (3.7 acres), while the other burned 0.01 ha (0.025 acres). Also on May 29, the Government of Canada said the fire danger level for Wood Buffalo National Park was high, with three out of control fires reported. On May 30, an evacuation alert was issued for Conklin due to concerns of a wildfire named LWF-059 spreading to the area; the alert was lifted a day later. Seven active wildfires were reported in the Athabasca oil sands on May 31 as wildfire season returned to the oil sands region.

=== British Columbia ===
This Copernicus Sentinel-2 satellite image, captured on 11 August 2026, shows extensive wildfire smoke spreading across western Canada and into the northwestern United States.

Officials warned that British Columbia would face the highest and most sustained risk of the season. Fire danger across the country was expected to build through July. Significant wildfire activity was expected in B.C.. In June, Neal McLoughlin, superintendent of B.C. Wildfire Service's predictive services unit, warned current drought conditions forebode a challenging season.

On June 16, tactical evacuations were carried out after a fast moving and out of control fire in West Kelowna, the Kalamoir Park Fire, burned 8 hectares (20 acres) and came close to homes. About 800 people living in 357 properties were forced to evacuate. A pergola was lost, but no major structures, and the evacuation order was lifted. The fire was suspected to be human-caused.

Wildfires increased in severity in August. The Pear Lake fire destroyed structures on about 120 properties near Clinton, and near Vernon at least 200 homes were destroyed, according to the Okanagan Indian Band. On the west side of Okanagan Lake, wildfires forced the evacuations of over 5,000 people. Fires destroyed electrical infrastructure and caused power outages for thousands, while extreme wind and lightning at the start of the month created aggressive wildfires elsewhere in the province's south.

Southwest of the lake, the Bald Range fire formed on August 7 around 5:30pm and grew so rapidly that premier David Eby described it as a "bomb going off". Flames reached over 61 metres (200 ft) and created pyrocumulus clouds and lightning. Approaching Summerland the next day, the fire grew from 50 to 95 square kilometres (37 mi^{2}), and all 12,000 residents were ordered to immediately evacuate. At least 55 people were rescued by helicopter. and 10,000 took shelter in nearby Penticton. With over 21,000 people evacuated, British Columbia declared a province-wide state of emergency. Penticton RCMP confirmed that an 80-year-old woman died attempting to escape the Bald Range fire, and believe that the wildfire was the cause of death.

=== Manitoba ===
Seven fires burned between The Pas and Cranberry Portage, an area that wildfires scorched the previous year. One fire located 1 kilometre (0.62 mi) from Easterville burned approximately 400 ha (990 acres).

=== Newfoundland and Labrador ===
The 2026 wildfire season in Newfoundland and Labrador began with relatively encouraging conditions. On June 25, 2026, officials reported 61 wildfires in the province, a 55 percent decrease from the 136 fires recorded by the same date in 2025. At that time, only one active wildfire was burning near Labrador City, and wetter conditions than the previous year were credited for the reduction in fire activity.

Lightning strikes ignited several wildfires across Labrador on June 26. One near Oreway, approximately 70 kilometres (43 mi) from Labrador City, grew to 470 hectares and was classified as out of control. Additional fires were reported near Miron River and Churchill Falls, raising concerns about the region's dry conditions and increasing wildfire risk. By June 29, a fire near Walsh River, about eight kilometres west of Labrador City, prompted evacuation orders for Walsh River, Tamarack Golf Course, Duley Lake, and Throne Lake. Labrador City declared a state of emergency as water bombers, helicopters, and ground crews were deployed. At that time, 17 wildfires were burning in the province, with 16 in Labrador.

On June 30, five wildfires were burning within a 30-kilometre radius of Labrador City and Wabush, forcing approximately 120 residents from their homes and cabins. The Walsh River fire remained out of control, while smoke reduced visibility on highways and contributed to air-quality concerns. Despite rainfall providing some relief, the Walsh River fire grew to 472 hectares, and the province reported 28 active wildfires, with 25 in Labrador. The elevated fire danger led to the postponement of Canada Day fireworks in St. John's and the cancellation of celebrations in Labrador City and Happy Valley-Goose Bay.

Suppression efforts expanded as additional firefighters from Nova Scotia arrived to assist provincial crews on July 4. Firefighters focused on strengthening containment lines and soaking fire perimeters in anticipation of hot, dry weather. Five wildfires remained active around Labrador West, with several out of control. By July 6, officials reported 25 active wildfires across Labrador. Forestry Minister Pleaman Forsey stated that firefighting resources were being prioritized toward wildfires threatening communities, particularly the Walsh River and De Mille Lake fires. The state of emergency in Labrador City remained in effect, and evacuation orders continued for several affected areas. Smoke from wildfires in both Labrador and Quebec also created significant air-quality concerns across the region. In response to elevated fire danger and pressure on firefighting resources, the provincial government implemented a province-wide fire ban, prohibiting outdoor burning throughout Newfoundland and Labrador.

Conditions improved on July 9, 2026, when the Walsh River fire was downgraded to "held" status. After ten days of evacuation, residents and cabin owners in the Walsh River area were permitted to return home, although evacuation alerts remained in effect for nearby locations. With the fire under control, Labrador City lifted evacuation alerts for Walsh River, Duley Lake, Throne Lake, and the Tamarack Golf Course area on July 13. Provincial forestry maps showed that several major fires near Labrador West were either extinguished, controlled, or held, significantly reducing the threat to nearby communities. Steady rainfall dramatically lowered the forest fire index in Labrador West. Most remaining fires were in remote areas and no longer posed immediate threats to communities or critical infrastructure. The provincial government also announced additional wildfire-response investments, including seasonal water bomber deployment in Wabush, new firefighting equipment, and additional wildland firefighter positions for Labrador.

The season entered a recovery phase on July 17 when the provincial government announced that the province-wide fire ban would end at midnight. Although 19 active wildfires remained in Labrador, conditions had improved sufficiently for officials to return to normal restrictions. By August 10, 2026, there were only four active fires in parts of central and northern Labrador. It was noted that the year had seen fewer fires versus 2025, at 126 to date compared to 243 last year, but a larger area burned in total hectares.

=== Northwest Territories ===
Several wildfires and their smoke plumes can be seen near Fort Simpson in this acquisition from 16 July 2026, which combines different data from ESA's EarthCARE satellite with an optical image of the area captured by the Copernicus Sentinel-3 mission.

The Northwest Territories and British Columbia were forecasted to have the highest wildfire risk. The territory's soil had not fully recovered from previous droughts, allowing fires to burn deeper into the ground.

At the end of April, overwintering fires were reported in Fort Providence and Whatì, which had both been evacuated in 2025. On May 18, the territory was fighting three fires, two of which were human caused (one an abandoned campfire), and the third an overwintering fire. Lightning sparked four wildfires on May 22 in Wood Buffalo National Park. The largest fire burned 35,288 ha (87,200 acres) by May 29. Lightning caused two wildfires southwest of Norman Wells on June 14, with one burning 90 ha (220 acres) and the other burning 300 ha (740 acres). In late June, 1,300 people were evacuated from Fort Simpson and 130 from Wrigley, most of whom took shelter in Yellowknife. On June 24, a Buffalo Airways Rockwell Aero Commander 690 with a pilot and two firefighters died in a crash during firefighting operations 50 kilometres (31 mi) from Fort Simpson.

=== Nova Scotia ===
Wildfire season in Nova Scotia normally runs from mid-March to mid-October, though in 2025 it was extended due to ongoing fires. The 2025 Long Lake fire, which had burned 8,500 ha (21,000 acres) in Annapolis Valley, destroyed 20 homes, and forced hundreds of evacuations before being brought under control in September, was declared officially extinguished on May 26, 2026.

On May 21, a 40-year-old firefighter died after a sudden medical emergency while battling the Moschelle Fire near Moschelle in Annapolis County. The fire continued to burn approximately 1.19 ha (2.9 acres) before being brought under control later that evening.

=== Ontario ===
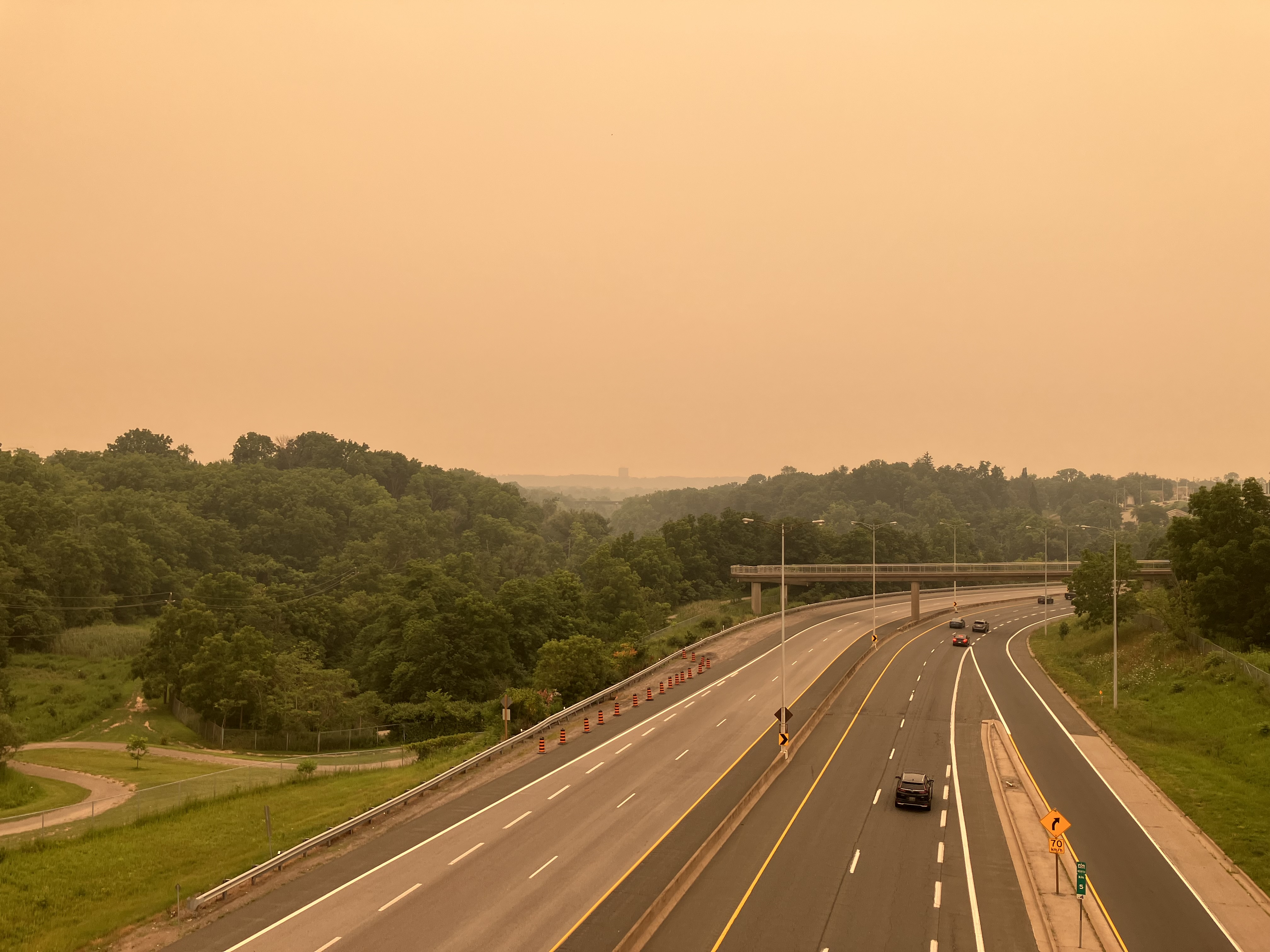
Poor air quality in the Niagara region on July 15

Ontario saw above-average activity in 2025, with 643 fires and over 600,000 ha (1,500,000 acres) burned. In preparation for 2026, the province hired an additional 68 firefighters and municipalities began public education campaigns.

Wildfire activity in Northwestern Ontario was slow to start, with 62 fires and 280.6 ha (693 acres) burned being reported by May 26. On May 15, a 168 ha (420 acres) out of control fire named Dryden 11 ignited near Sandbar Lake Provincial Park, causing evacuations and prompting the closure of Ontario Highway 599 north of Ignace. Another fire named Fort Frances 4 caused evacuations in Mine Centre before being extinguished after burning 12.6 ha (31 acres). That fire and two other fires destroyed property and killed two pets in Rainy River District.

On May 27, a 3 ha (7.4 acres) fire ignited in Haliburton County. As of May 29, the fire remained out of control.

On May 31, a fire called Timmins 9 was reported. The fire grew to around 3,300 ha (8,200 acres) and caused more than 160 residents of Mattagami First Nation to evacuate before being brought under control on June 15.

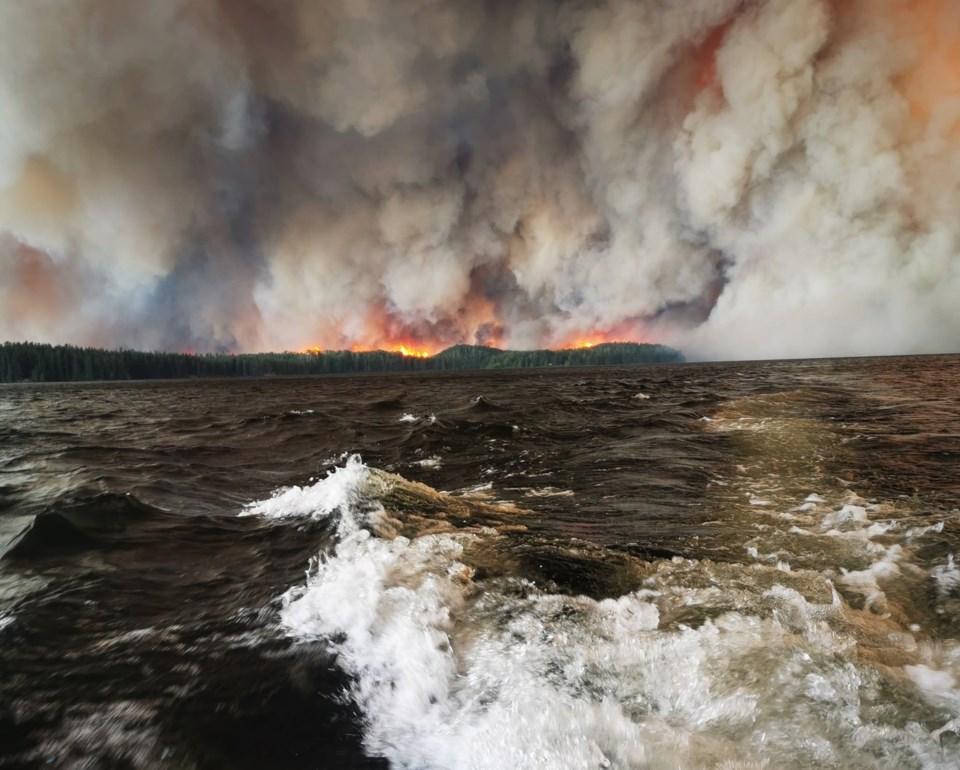
The Thunder Bay 36 Fire destroying the Namaygoosisagagun First Nation on July 14

The most severe fire of the year, Thunder Bay 36, formed in the Wabakimi Provincial Park area in Northwestern Ontario on July 12 as the merger of several smaller fires. As of July 16, the fire is the largest active fire in the region at 350,922 ha (867,150 acres). The community of Namaygoosisagagun First Nation (also known as Collins First Nation) was evacuated, and later destroyed, with the unexpected fast-moving wildfire severely damaging homes and community buildings there. The fire also prompted evacuation orders in Armstrong, Lac La Croix First Nation, Whitesand First Nation, Lac des Mille Lacs First Nation and Gull Bay First Nation. A video of CN Rail employees inside a train being surrounded by flames in Armstrong went viral on July 15. CN suspended rail operations near the community due to fires in the area.

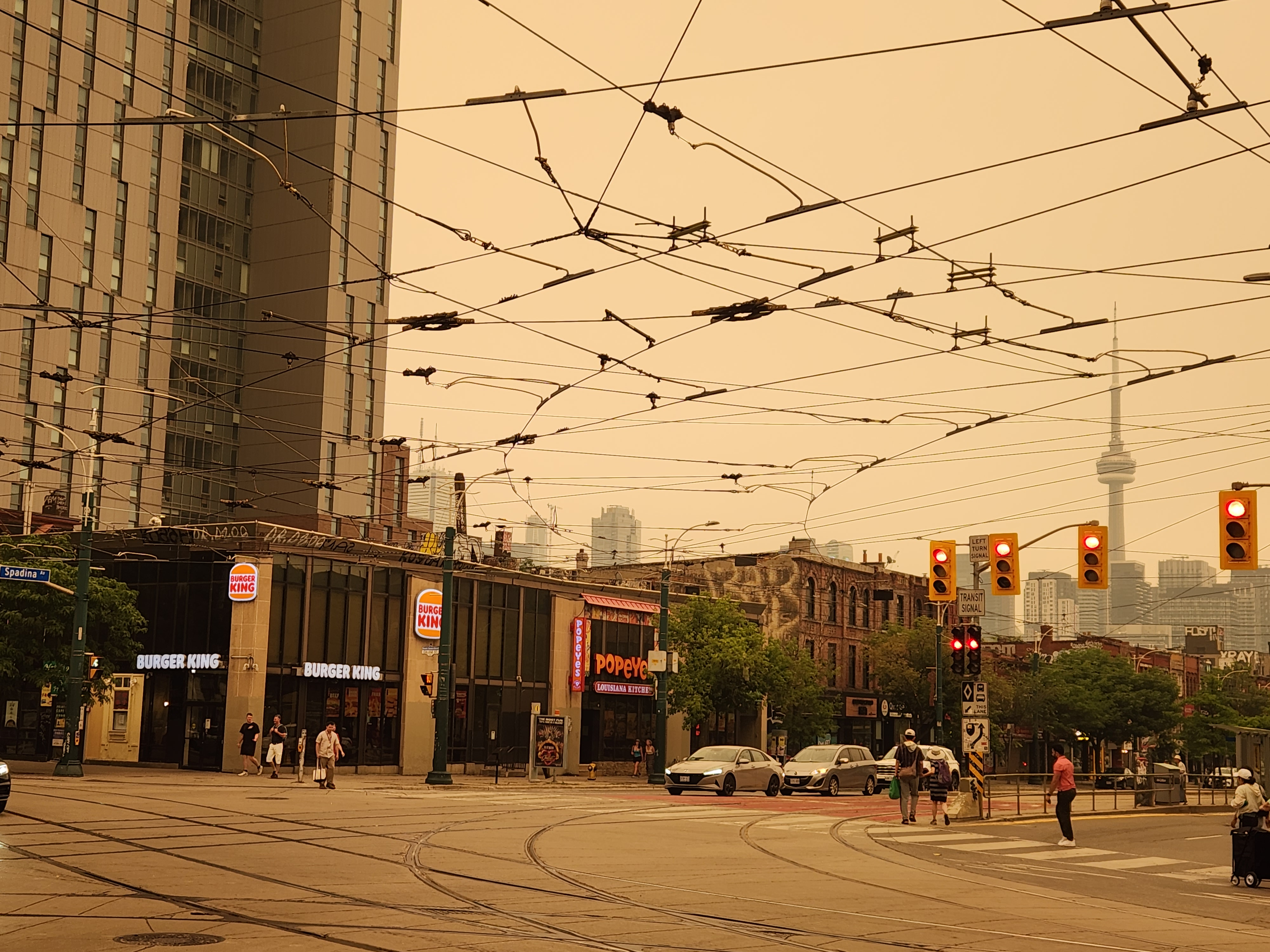
Wildfire smoke in Toronto on July 15

There were over 180 active wildfires across Ontario, with 136 burning in Northwest Ontario, on July 15. Smoke began drifting over southwestern Ontario, rendering Toronto's air quality the worst in the world among major cities and covering the area with a smoky orange haze. The city was put under an orange alert, meaning severe weather is likely to cause damage, disruption or health impacts. Several youths were treated at a camp in Muskoka Lakes for air quality-related issues. A small number of people were also transported to the Sault Area Hospital in Sault Ste. Marie for smoke inhalation. The emergency departments at Toronto General Hospital and Toronto Western Hospital received 36 visits from patients experiencing issues related to poor air quality, including shortness of breath, allergic reaction, chest pain, cough/congestion, and eye pain on July 15.

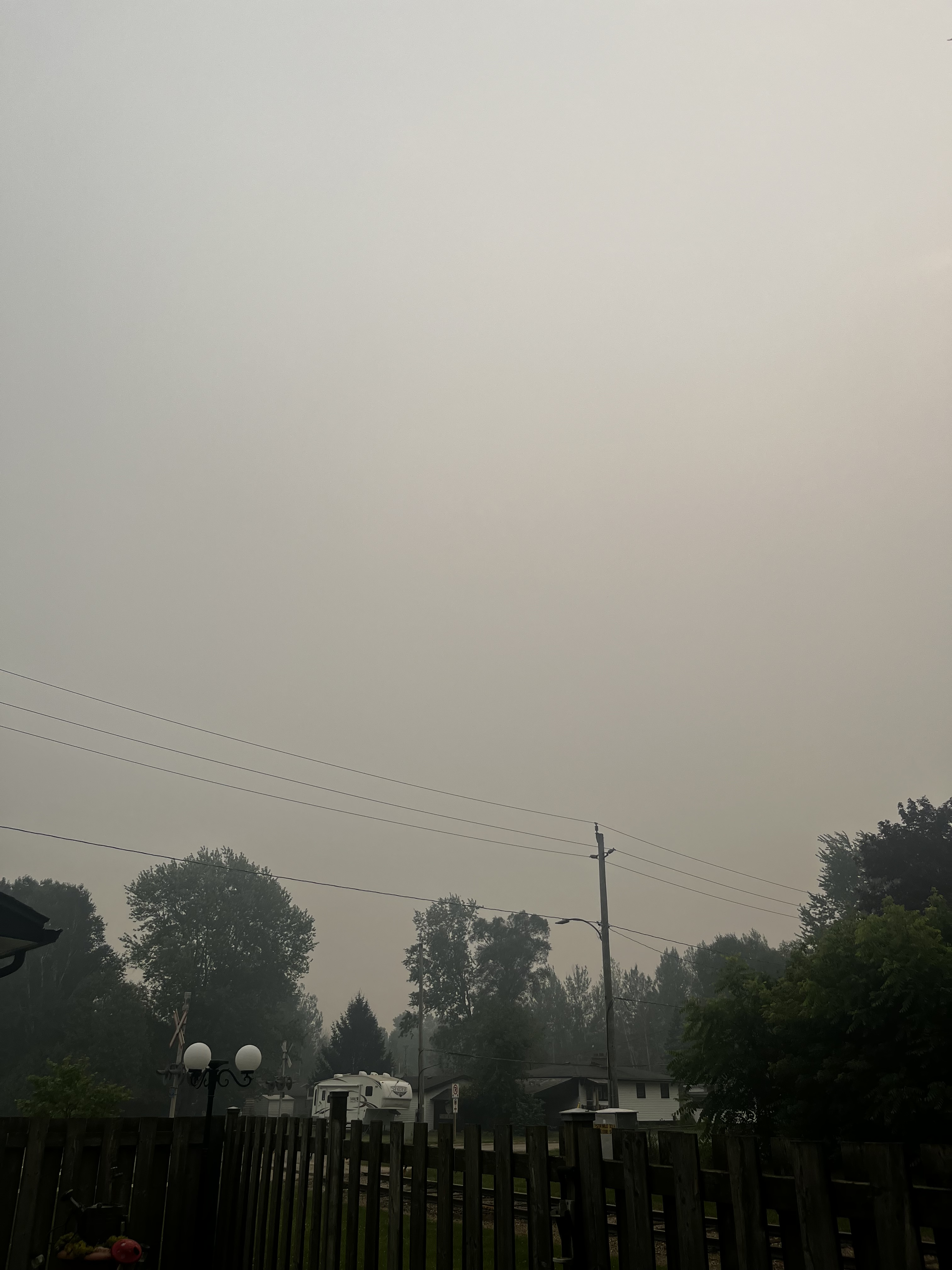
Wildfire smoke over Central Elgin on July 16 during an AQI of 236

By July 16, the air quality in Toronto was about five times worse than it was on the previous day, with the orange alert still in effect. Air throughout the province from Thunder Bay to Toronto became hazardous, reaching the worst level in the Air Quality Health Index (AQHI).

Smoke mostly dissipated by July 20.

The Ontario government's handling of the fires in Northwestern Ontario has come under serious criticism by First Nations leadership, including a call for a public inquiry into the wildfire response.

=== Saskatchewan ===
Saskatchewan faced severe wildfires in 2025, with 500 fires burning 3,000,000 ha (7,400,000 acres), forcing the evacuation of over 10,000 people and destroying half of the village of Denare Beach. The province saw increased snowpack in the north and central parts of the province, but drought and little snow in the south. The Saskatchewan Public Safety Agency (SPSA) vice-president stated in April that they expected a "normal spring" with wildfire risk coming later in the summer.

Wildfire season began in late May following low humidity drying out the previous season's grass, which had not yet had time to grow. On May 25, the Lobstick Fire began in Prince Albert. On May 29, the rapidly growing fire crossed the North Saskatchewan River, approaching homes, and the SPSA issued a fire ban covering large portion of the province. Six homes were threatened, with some families being evacuated and others on standby. Video showed ash raining down from flammagenitus clouds in Prince Albert ahead of evacuation orders in the region. Some ranchers moved their cattle. The fire is estimated to have burned 19,000 ha (47,000 acres) and could cost $20–25 million dollars in timber losses. On May 30, an evacuation alert was issued for Shellbrook as the fire was fast-moving. By May 31, the fire was reportedly calmer but still raging. The SPSA identified lightning as the cause of the fire.

== International effects ==
=== United States ===
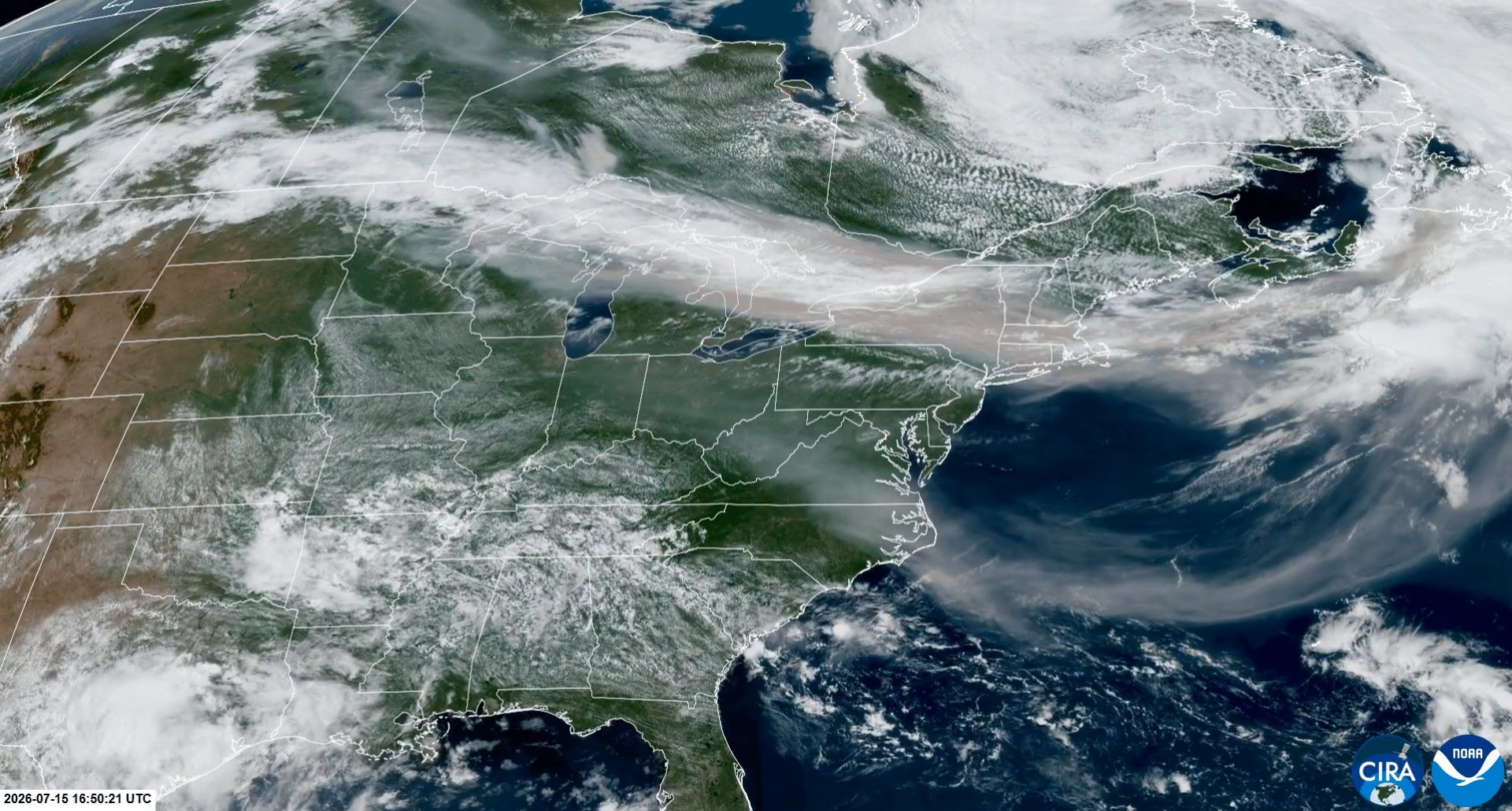
Thick smoke from the wildfires drifting across the eastern United States on July 15

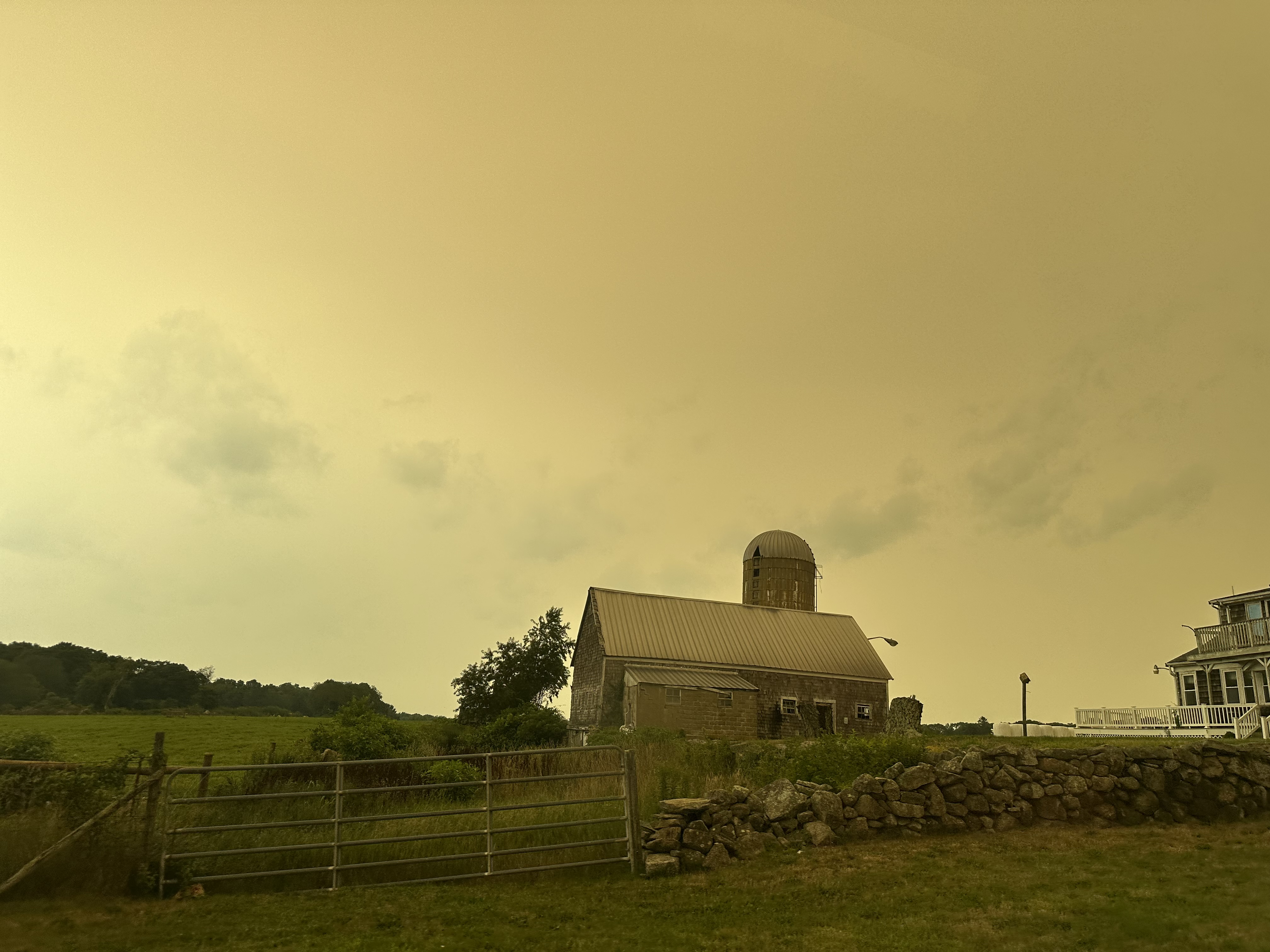
The smoke plume as seen on a farm in Westport, Massachusetts, on July 15

Smoke in Wyandotte, Michigan on July 16

Smoke from wildfires along with hot temperatures affected a large portion of the Northeastern United States in July. The New York City Emergency Management (NYCEM) warned that any ground-level effects are still uncertain, but that the air quality could trigger health issues, especially for those suffering from lung diseases such as asthma. Despite the heat advisory in New York expiring late on July 15, mayor Zohran Mamdani kept cooling centres open on July 16 due to smoke. Smoke from the wildfires was seen in the Upper Midwest and caused poor air quality as far east as Boston on July 15. Smoke caused Michigan air quality to go into the hazardous range. AQI values in and around Saginaw reached 1,135, well above the criteria to meet hazardous level. AQI values from a mix of wildfire smoke from Canada and the state in Virginia, Minnesota, reached 1,615. The following day, with an AQI of 460, Detroit was ranked among the worst cities in the world for air quality, prompting the closures of Greenfield Village and the Belle Isle Aquarium as well as the cancellation of a planned John Mellencamp concert at Pine Knob Music Theatre. Several dozen assembly line workers at Ford Motor Company's Michigan Assembly Plant were sent to medical units, with several hospitalized, after haze from the smoke, combined with hot temperatures, lingered inside the plant throughout the night of July 15 into the morning of July 16. High AQI levels also affected Minneapolis, where Valleyfair closed due to poor air quality, and Chicago, where a Major League Soccer match between the Chicago Fire FC and Vancouver Whitecaps was postponed.

On July 16, FOX 56, a station covering the cities of Hazelton, Wilkes-Barre, and Scranton in the state of Pennsylvania forecasted a maximum AQI of 190 for the region. Pennsylvania, Maryland, and New York were put under "Code Red" and "Code Purple" air quality alerts. On the afternoon of July 16, the air quality reached 576 in Cleveland. Cedar Point closed for the day early at 7 p.m. on July 16 due to the smoke. At least 16 other states are under air quality alerts as smoke blanketed new portions of the Midwest and Northeast. In Rochester, New York, there were several closures, including the Seneca Park Zoo. Michael Petroni, a pollution expert and former United States Environmental Protection Agency (EPA) employee, told the New York Post that spending approximately a full day outside would be equivalent to having smoked ten cigarettes. A video posted to Instagram by The Weather Channel showed a blood-red sun outside of the Chrysler Building in Manhattan.

On July 17, a ground delay program was issued for Philadelphia International Airport due to smoke, causing delays. The Philadelphia Zoo was also closed on July 17 due to smoke. The Cleveland Guardians were also forced to suspend their game against the Pittsburgh Pirates on July 17 due to smoke.

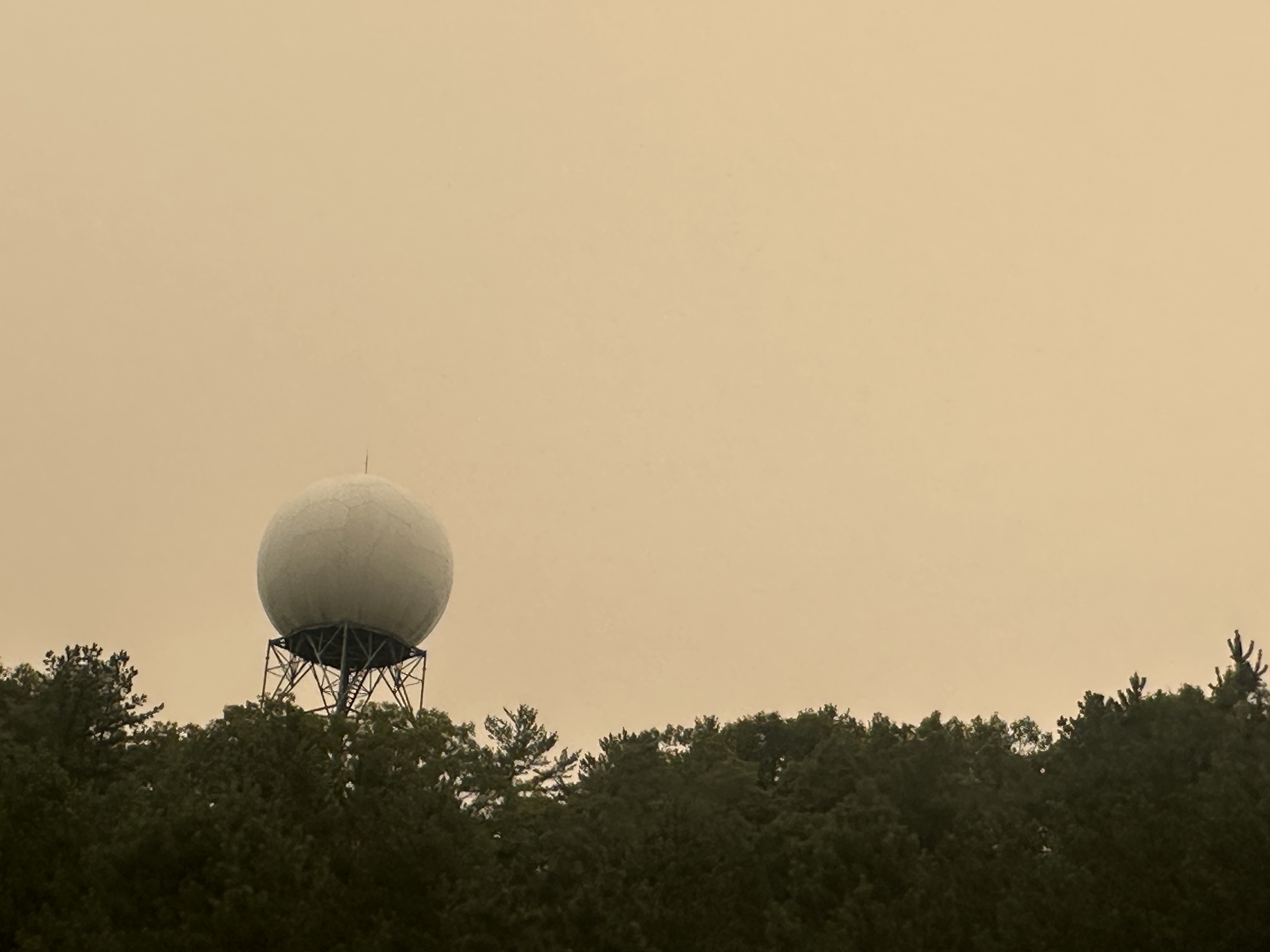
The sky outside of the National Weather Service New York City office obscured by a thick layer of smoke

The National Weather Service (NWS) said smoke could linger into the end of the week. Air quality indexes reached 173 early on July 18 in New York City, before several rounds of rain moved in and improved the air quality. However, the heavy rain also resulted in dangerous flash flooding, resulting in hundreds of flight delays, including a ground stop at Newark Liberty International Airport, and several road closures.

There were concerns that smoke would affect the air quality of the 2026 FIFA World Cup final, and in turn impact player performance. Spain decided to practice under the smoke, while Argentina practiced in Atlanta to avoid the smoke. FIFA President Gianni Infantino met with US President Donald Trump and World Cup Task Force leader Andrew Giuliani to discuss the wildfires. At the time, New York and New Jersey were under air quality alerts, and air quality readings in New York City were deemed "very unhealthy" and well beyond levels deemed dangerous to the general public. But the day prior to the final, due to heavy thunderstorms passing through the venue for the final, the amount of smoke became light, and the air quality improved to the point where there was no risk to the general public.

=== Mexico ===
Light density wildfire smoke was reported across numerous Mexican states.

== Responses ==
In mid-June, the Senate Committee on Agriculture and Forestry called for a federal emergency management agency to oversee firefighting resources after a report found that some jurisdictions do not have enough firefighters or aircraft to effectively fight fires. On June 16, three people and two environmental groups filed a lawsuit against the Canadian government seeking to force it to develop an action plan to meet its key climate goals. The federal government pledged $47.8 million dollars extended over five years to improve wildfire preparedness. The government leased ten new firefighting planes and helicopters to boost firefighting capacity. The Saskatchewan provincial government said they're stronger prepared than last year, when more than 500 fires burned more than 3,000,000 ha (7,400,000 acres) across the province. Some utility companies in Alberta, including AltaLink, are testing AI-powered cameras to detect wildfires north of Kananaskis Village and just west of Canmore. The Northwest Territories launched a new program to improve wildfire protection. The government of the Northwest Territories carried out infrared scanning missions on large fire perimeters to seek and destroy hot spots. The Nova Scotia government contracted four fixed-wing water bombers, four helicopters, and a co-ordination plane for firefighting. A crew in Manitoba planted trees in areas burned by fires.

New York City mayor Zohran Mamdani opened cooling centres and gave away free KN95 masks. Similarly, Detroit mayor Mary Sheffield announced that the city would distribute free masks to recreation centres, along the Detroit Department of Transportation system, and senior buildings.

Members of the US Republican Party blamed Canada for the smoke spreading across the northern United States, accusing them of poor forest management; four US representatives for Michigan wrote a letter to Mark Carney pledging action if Canada does not take further actions toward fire prevention. CBC noted the contrast between the letter and the approach of Pete Hoekstra, the US Ambassador to Canada. In a statement, Hoekstra said, "This is a shared challenge, and it demands a shared response." On July 17, president Donald Trump on Truth Social threatened to levy additional tariffs on Canada and stated he planned to call Carney about the matter. Senator Bernie Sanders blamed climate change for the wildfires, and also criticized Trump's climate change denial and support for oil companies for the worsening heat and wildfires. Carney stated that climate change is the responsibility of all nations, including the United States. Canadian politician Doug Ford called Trump's rhetoric "unacceptable", noting that Canada sent aid to assist with recovery from the Effects of Hurricane Helene in Georgia in 2024. Senator Patty Murray also defended Canada, and blamed DOGE for affecting wildfire responses.

Over 100 Mexican firefighters arrived in British Columbia in August.

== See also ==
- New England's Dark Day
