= Thunder Bay 36 Fire =

2026 wildfire in Ontario, Canada

Thunder Bay 36
- Part of the 2026 Canadian wildfires
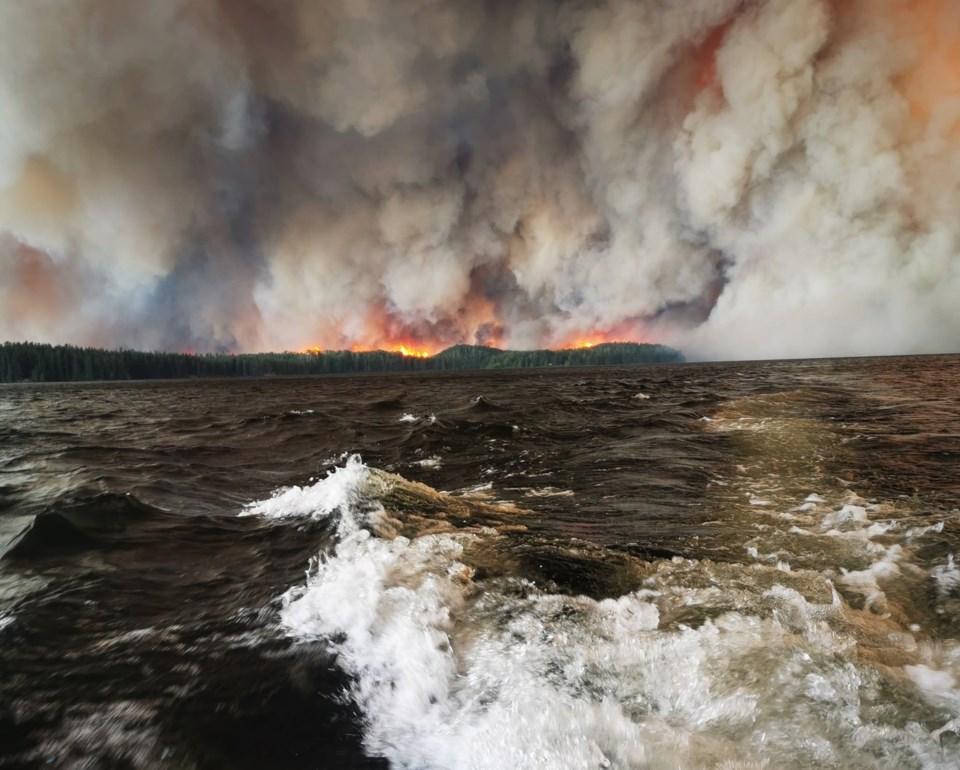
- A thick plume of dark grey smoke billows high into the sky over Collins Lake as Thunder Bay 36 destroys the Namaygoosisagagun (Collins) First Nation community.
- Date: 12 July 2026 – present
- Location: Thunder Bay District, Ontario, Canada
- Coordinates: 50.68°N 89.48°W

Statistics
- Status: Ongoing wildfire
- Burned area: 314,000 hectares (775,911 acres)

Ignition
- Cause: Under investigation

Map
- Perimeters of 2026 Thunder Bay 36 Fire (map data)
- Location of Thunder Bay 36 in Ontario, Canada

Thunder Bay 36 (also known as THU036) is a large wildfire burning in Wabakimi Provincial Park in northwestern Ontario, Canada. The fire started on 12 July 2026 and grew rapidly through mid-July; following aerial and ground remapping, it was measured at 314,000 hectares (775,911 acres) as of 29 July, making it the largest wildfire in Ontario's recorded history. It was created when the Dryden 13 fire and several other fires merged. On 13–14 July the fire saw significant growth in the area of Namaygoosisagagun First Nation, Armstrong and Whitesand First Nation. Namaygoosisagagun First Nation was destroyed a few days later. On July 18, significant damage was also reported at Whitewater Lake First Nation, a community belonging to the Windigo First Nations Council.

By August 2026, Thunder Bay 36, together with Dryden 34 (DRY034) and Dryden 35 (DRY035), were referred to as the Rinker Complex or Rinker Lake Complex.

As of 31 July 2026, the fire remains out of control and has prompted evacuations of multiple First Nations communities and highway closures in the region; however, the number of evacuees across the region has declined since late July.

== Background ==
Ontario's 2026 fire season followed a warm, dry spring and weeks of below-normal precipitation across the province's northwest, which left the boreal forest primed to burn heading into July. A significant wave of lightning strikes beginning 6 July ignited numerous new fires across the region, some of which combined with fires already burning since as early as late May. Thunder Bay 36 formed in this period, when the Dryden 13 fire merged with several nearby fires in Wabakimi Provincial Park and expanded rapidly through mid-July, fuelled by sustained heat and low humidity. By 21 July, the province's cumulative burned area for the season had surpassed the previous record set in 2021, with officials and fire-weather specialists attributing the pace of the escalation to compounding drought, heat, and wind conditions rather than an event.

== Response ==
As the fire and other wildfires in northwestern Ontario expanded, evacuations were issued for multiple First Nations communities and residents in some nearby areas, along with highway closures in the region (see Impact). Ontario's Ministry of Natural Resources said several hundred wildland firefighters were working in the region, supported by nearly 50 aircraft including waterbombers and helicopters.

On 18 July, Ontario Premier Doug Ford said more than 155 fire crews were working on the ground, with more than 80 aircraft and 40 additional aircraft on standby. He warned that residents refusing to comply with evacuation orders were hindering the wildfire response. A 20-person Incident Management Team assumed command of Thunder Bay 36 later that week, overseeing nine crews, five heavy equipment operators and five helicopters assigned to the fire. Despite Recent rainfall temporarily reducing fire activity. Renewed growth remained possible if hot, dry, or windy conditions returned. An implementation order restricting travel and land use took effect around Thunder Bay 36 and nearby fires on 20 July.

By late July, the fire measured to be at almost 314,000 hectares by 28–29 July, with crews continuing containment work including fire guard construction, hot spot suppression, and helicopter bucketing. The number of active wildfires across the region continued to fluctuate, falling to 117 by 28 July before rising slightly to 122 the following day. A yellow heat warning was in effect across much of northwestern Ontario from 28 July, with daytime highs of 29 °C (84.2 °F) to 31 °C (87.8 °F) and humidex values as high as 38, adding to fire risk in the region.

== Impact ==
The fire completely destroyed the Namaygoosisagagun First Nation community in July 2026. Significant damage was also reported at Whitewater Lake First Nation on 18 July. A mandatory evacuation was also implemented for Kiashke Zaaging Anishinaabek (Gull Bay First Nation), on the western shore of Lake Nipigon. Multiple other First Nations communities faced evacuation orders, displacing hundreds of residents. As of 20 July, roughly 2,415 people had evacuated to host communities across Ontario, including Thunder Bay, Kenora, Fort Frances, Lac Seul, Sioux Lookout, Red Lake, Barrie, Niagara Falls, and Toronto; more than 300 air purifiers, dozens of air filters, and several air scrubbers had also been deployed to affected communities. Evacuees were relocated to host communities or emergency shelters, with support coordinated by provincial and federal authorities. Whitesand First Nation Chief Lawrence Wanakamik said in late July that there was no clear end in sight to his community's evacuation.

Highway closures in the region disrupted travel and supply chains, affecting local businesses and access to critical services. The fire has burned through large portions of Wabakimi Provincial Park and surrounding boreal forest, resulting in the loss of wildlife habitat and potential long-term changes to the ecosystem. Smoke from the fire contributed to poor air quality across northwestern Ontario, including in Thunder Bay, prompting health advisories; a related smoke plume was also reported affecting air quality across parts of the north-central United States.

On 19 July, the province expanded the evacuation order for areas near Armstrong, north and east of Lake Nipigon, citing Thunder Bay 36 along with several other nearby fires. The Canadian Red Cross established a reception centre for evacuees at the Fort William Gardens arena in Thunder Bay.

By 29 July, the number of evacuees had declined to roughly 2,088, as the Aroland First Nation and Ojibway of Saugeen First Nation communities returned home. On 27 July, a Canadian Armed Forces CC-130J Hercules aircraft assisted with the evacuation of Eabametoong First Nation.

The provincial response to this fire, and to other fires across Northwestern Ontario, has been heavily criticized by both firefighters and First Nations organizations.
