= Saint Sylvester's Church =

Church in Ontario, Canada

Coordinates: 49.0255°N 88.2439°W

Saint Sylvester's Church Jesuit Mission
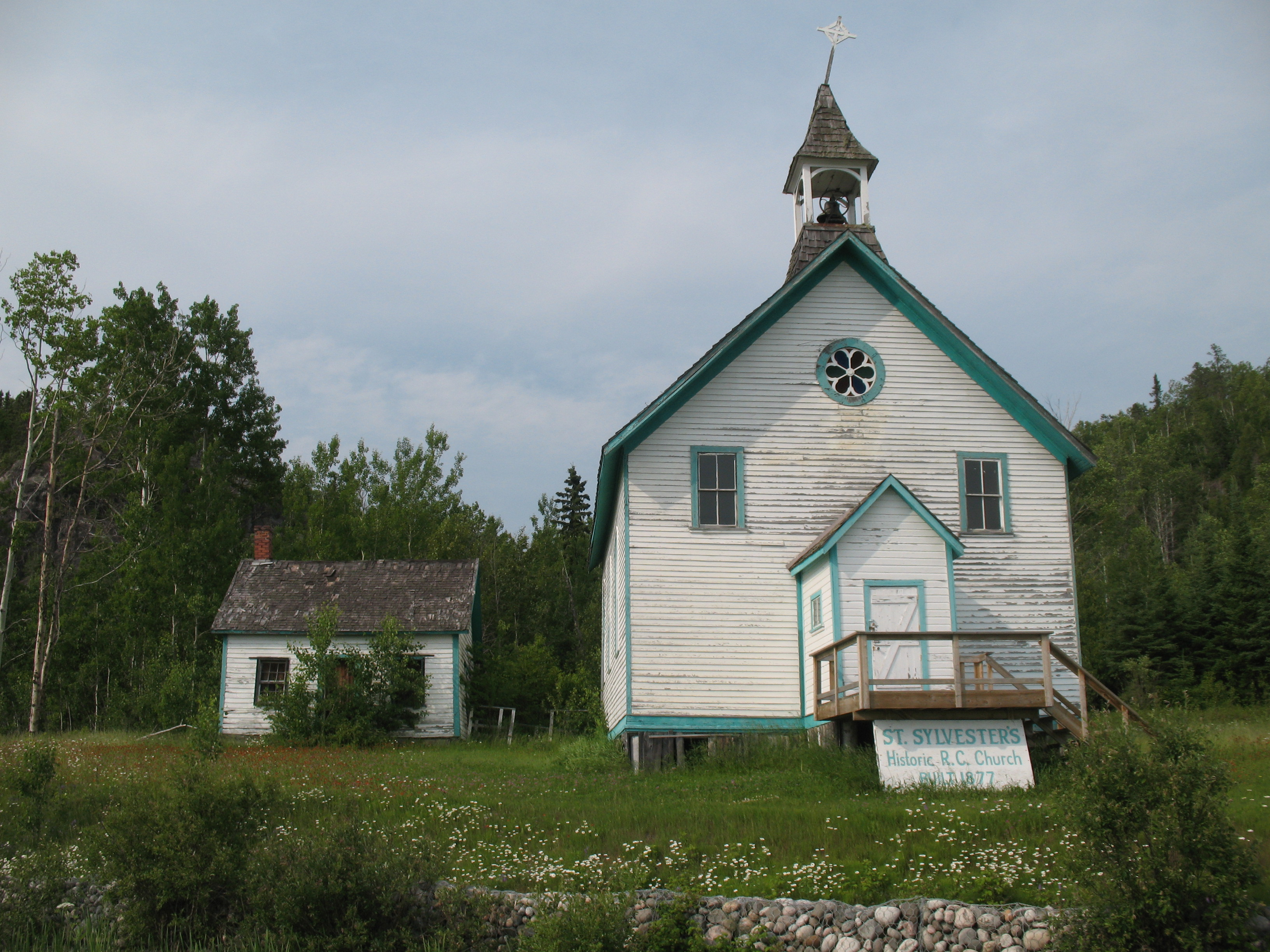
- St. Sylvester Mission Church Lake Helen
- Saint Sylvester's Church Jesuit Mission
- Denomination: Roman Catholic

History
- Dedication: St. Sylvester

Administration
- Province: Canada
- Diocese: Roman Catholic Diocese of Ontario
- Parish: Ontario

Saint Sylvester's Church is a Jesuit Mission on the Red Rock Indian Band on section Lake Helen 53A. It was established in 1852, and is locally called Opoo-gan-asin (pipestone). The first mass was held on February 29, 1852, in the Hudson Bay barn. Father D. Duranquette (Waiashtestkang—Gives Light) accompanied by the local Indians selected the spot on which the church was built. Jesuit Brothers decided to have this church built along their water route, which served as a rest stop before going to the Jesuit Missions at Gull Bay, White Sand, Nipigon House, Grand Bay and McIntre Bay on Lake Nipigon.

== History ==
Duranquette started building the mission church in 1875; it was completed in 1877. The living quarters (Priest House) adjoined the Church was built in 1878 by Father Joseph Hebert (Natainabow—Leader) The Church was built using hewn logs cut from the nearby forest. The work was done by the local Indians and the Priest and who ever was able to donate his time. Also, at the same time the brass bell was erected in the belfry. The bell was donated by the family of Louis Denys Delaronde an Ojibwe-French fur trader from Parmechene. Delaronde died in 1865 in Sault Ste-Marie.

The first recorded burial in the cemetery was on October 3, 1880. The cross was blessed by the Reverend Joseph Specht, SJM, on October 7, 1880.

As of 2021, the church is considered a mission of Church of the Annunciation of the Blessed Virgin Mary, in Nipigon and is still used during the summer. It is part of the diocese of Thunder Bay.

== See also ==
- List of Jesuit sites
