= Whitesand, Ontario =

Whitesand
- Indian reserve
- Whitesand Indian Reserve
- Location within Ontario
- Coordinates: 50°19′N 89°02′W
- Country: Canada
- Province: Ontario
- District: Thunder Bay
- First Nation: Whitesand

Area
  - Land: 8.26 km^{2} (3.19 sq mi)

Population (2011)
  - Total: 260
  - Density: 31.5/km^{2} (82/sq mi)
- Website: www.whitesandfirstnation.ca

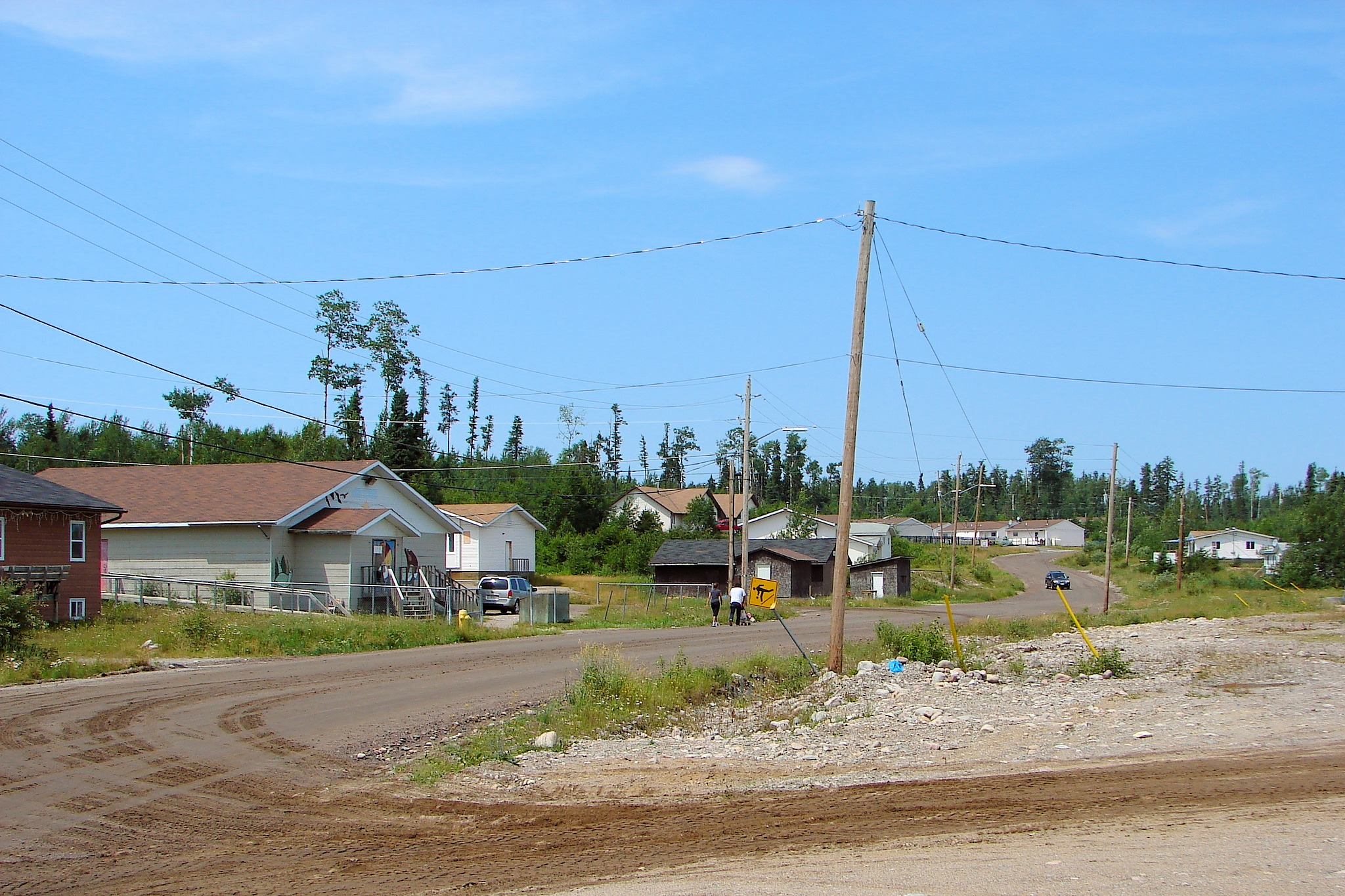
View of Whitesand Reserve (2012).

Whitesand is an Ojibwe First Nation reserve in northwestern Ontario. It serves as the land base for the Whitesand First Nation, alongside their settlement at Armstrong.
