= Animbiigoo Zaagi'igan Anishinaabek =

Lake Nipigon Indian Reserve Animbiigoo Zaagi'igan Anishinaabek
- First Nation Reserve
- Location within Ontario
- Coordinates: 49°43′N 87°23′W
- Country: Canada
- Province: Ontario
- District: Thunder Bay
- First Nation: Animbiigoo Zaagi'igan Anishinaabek

Area
  - Land: 12.699 km^{2} (4.903 sq mi)

Population (2023)
  - Total: 482
- Website: www.aza.ca

Animbiigoo Zaagi'igan Anishinaabek First Nation is an Ojibwe First Nation in northwestern Ontario. It has a reserve on Partridge Lake called Lake Nipigon Indian Reserve within the town of Greenstone. It is a member of Waaskiinaysay Ziibi Inc.
