= Red Rock Indian Band =

First Nation in Ontario, Canada

Coordinates: 49°01′52″N 88°14′53″W

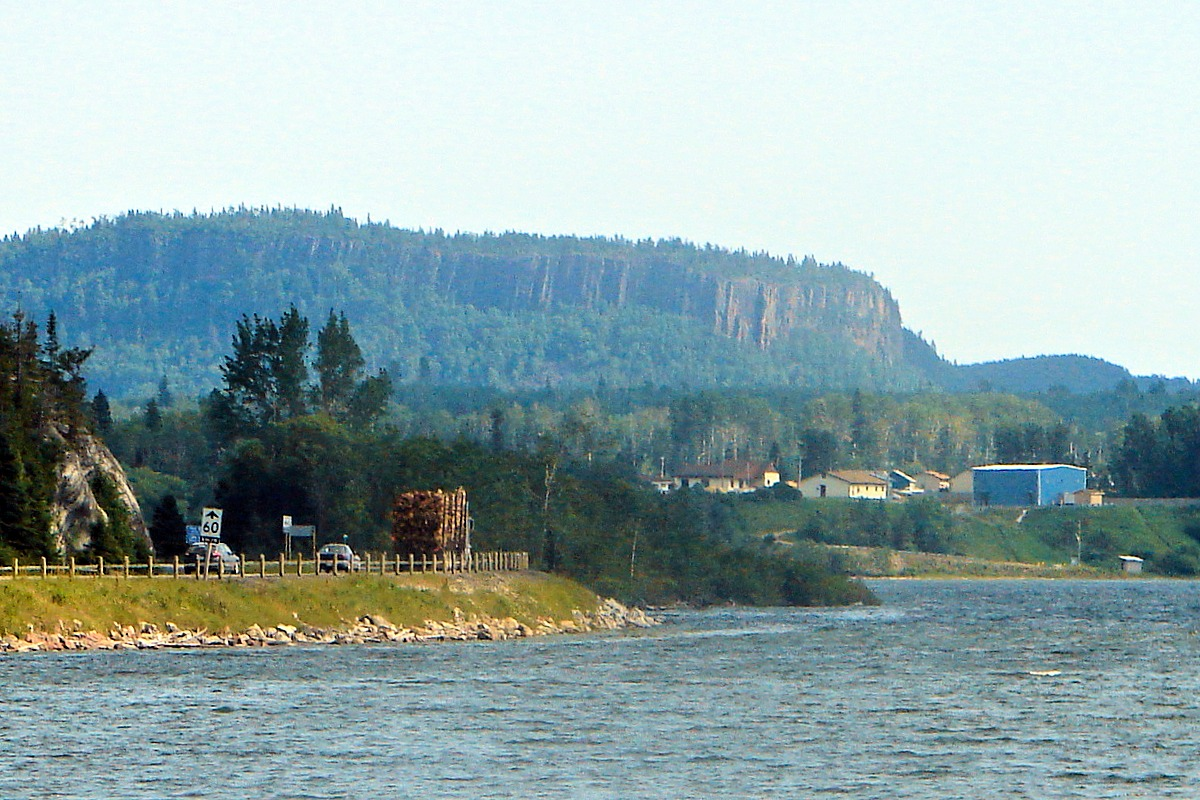
Lake Helen reserve seen across Lake Helen

Red Rock Indian Band (also known as Lake Helen Reserve) is an Ojibwe First Nation band government in Northwestern Ontario, Canada. Their territory is located on the Red Rock 53 (formerly Parmachene 53) and Lake Helen 53A Indian reserves in Ontario. As of March 2017, they had a total registered population of 1,837 people. The Nation is led by Chief Allan Odawa. The council is an independent member of Anishinabek Nation, a First Nations political organization. The First Nation is also a member of Waaskiinaysay Ziibi Inc., an economic development corporation made up of five Lake Nipigon First Nations.

Members of the Red Rock Indian Band once lived in different locations on and around Lake Nipigon. Historically, members are known to have lived at Jackfish Island, Gull Bay, and McIntyre Bay (English Mission Church) also called Grand Bay.

The Indian reserves are approximately 100 km northeast of the city of Thunder Bay and 2 km east of Nipigon. The total area covered by the two reserves is approximately 950 acres (3.8 km^{2}). This site is also the location of Saint Sylvesters Church. St. Sylvester's Church was built in 1877, which was a Jesuit Mission. The first recorded burial was on October 3, 1880. The graveyard is adjacent to the church and people are still buried there regularly. Although a historical landmark, the Church is no longer used as the building structure is unsafe. The Red Rock Indian Band is located within the 1850 Robinson Superior Treaty area. Band members use the Parmachene area regularly, for fishing, berry picking, hunting, trapping, gathering medicinal plants, camping, and participate in traditional ceremonies. Blueberry picking in particular is enjoyed by many Red Rock Indian Band members. The Lake Helen Reserve 53A is the main community located on the shores of Lake Helen.

Al Hackner, 2-time world curling champion, is a member of Red Rock Indian Band.

The traditional Ojibwe name for the band is Opwaaganasiniing, which is the locative form of the word for pipestone.
