= Waaskiinaysay Ziibi Inc. =

Waaskiinaysay Ziibi Inc. Development Corporation is a First Nations economic development corporation in northern Ontario, formed for the purpose of training tribal members for construction jobs in the Little Jackfish Generation Project, a proposed hydroelectric dam to be built on the Little Jackfish River. As of 2023, the dam has not yet broken ground.

Waaskiinaysay Ziibi Inc. includes the First Nations of:

- Animbiigoo Zaagi'igan Anishinaabek First Nation
- Bingwi Neyaashi Anishinaabek First Nation
- Biinjitiwaabik Zaaging Anishinaabek First Nation
- Red Rock Indian Band
- Whitesand First Nation

Waaskiinaysay Ziibi Inc. has cooperated with Ontario Power Generation and Confederation College.
