= Red Rock 53 =

- Indian reserve
- Red Rock Indian Reserve No. 53
- Location within Ontario
- Coordinates: 49°04′N 88°19′W
- Country: Canada
- Province: Ontario
- District: Thunder Bay
- First Nation: Red Rock

Area
  - Land: 1.84 km^{2} (0.71 sq mi)

Red Rock 53 (formerly Parmachene 53) is a First Nations reserve in Thunder Bay District, Ontario. It is one of the reserves of the Red Rock Indian Band.
