= Big Bar Complex =

2026 wildfire in British Columbia, Canada

- Date: July 17, 2026 – October 15, 2026
- Location: French Bar Creek, Pear Lake, and Rim Lake, British Columbia, Canada

Statistics
- Burned area: 186,738 hectares (721 square miles; 1,867 square kilometres; 461,440 acres) (as of August 9, 2026)
- Land use: Residential, Crown land, forestry

The Big Bar Complex Fire was wildfire complex in British Columbia's South Cariboo region north of Clinton, spanning approximately 186,738 hectares as of August 9, 2026. The complex was made up of three main fires: the Pear Lake wildfire (the largest in the province at roughly 165,909 hectares), the French Bar Creek wildfire (61,050 hectares), and the Rim Lake wildfire (4,794 hectares). A nearby fire, the Bonanza Creek wildfire (26,822 hectares), was not part of the Big Bar Complex but was frequently reported alongside it, bringing the combined total of wildfires near Clinton to more than 213,000 hectares as of the same date. Aggravated by persistent drought, erratic winds, and shifting weather fronts, the complex forced widespread evacuation orders and alerts across the Cariboo and Thompson-Nicola regional districts, threatening regional hubs, local ranches, and rural communities like 70 Mile House and Jesmond.

== Progression ==
On July 24, 2026, the Thompson-Nicola Regional District and the Village of Clinton issued an evacuation order for the Big Bar Wildfire Complex, directing residents on Jesmond Road, on Big Bar Road west of Jesmond Road, and from Clinton north to Chasm and south to Six Mile Lake on Highway 97 to leave the area immediately.

As of August 8–9, 2026, more than 500 firefighters, roughly two dozen helicopters, over 100 pieces of heavy equipment, and more than 200 structure protection personnel were assigned to the complex, according to BC Wildfire Service figures reported by Castanet.net (506 firefighters, 23 helicopters, 102 pieces of heavy equipment, 238 structure protection personnel; August 8) and Chilliwack Progress (471 firefighters, 22 helicopters, 116 pieces of heavy equipment, 225 structure protection personnel; August 9). Fire crews have also been working with BC Hydro to restore infrastructure damaged by the fire.

== Impact ==
The Big Bar Complex wildfire caused significant damage to electrical infrastructure serving Clinton, 70 Mile House, parts of the Cache Creek area, Big Bar Lake, and the Highway 97 corridor between 70 Mile House and Loon Lake. BC Hydro preliminary assessments identified approximately 230 damaged distribution poles and 200 damaged transmission poles in the affected area, with roughly 1,100 customers left without power. BC Hydro said the scale of the damage would require rebuilding large sections of infrastructure rather than isolated repairs, and estimated Clinton could be re-energized within approximately two weeks, subject to fire conditions and safe access.
