= Lake Helen 53A =

- Indian reserve
- Lake Helen Indian Reserve No. 53A
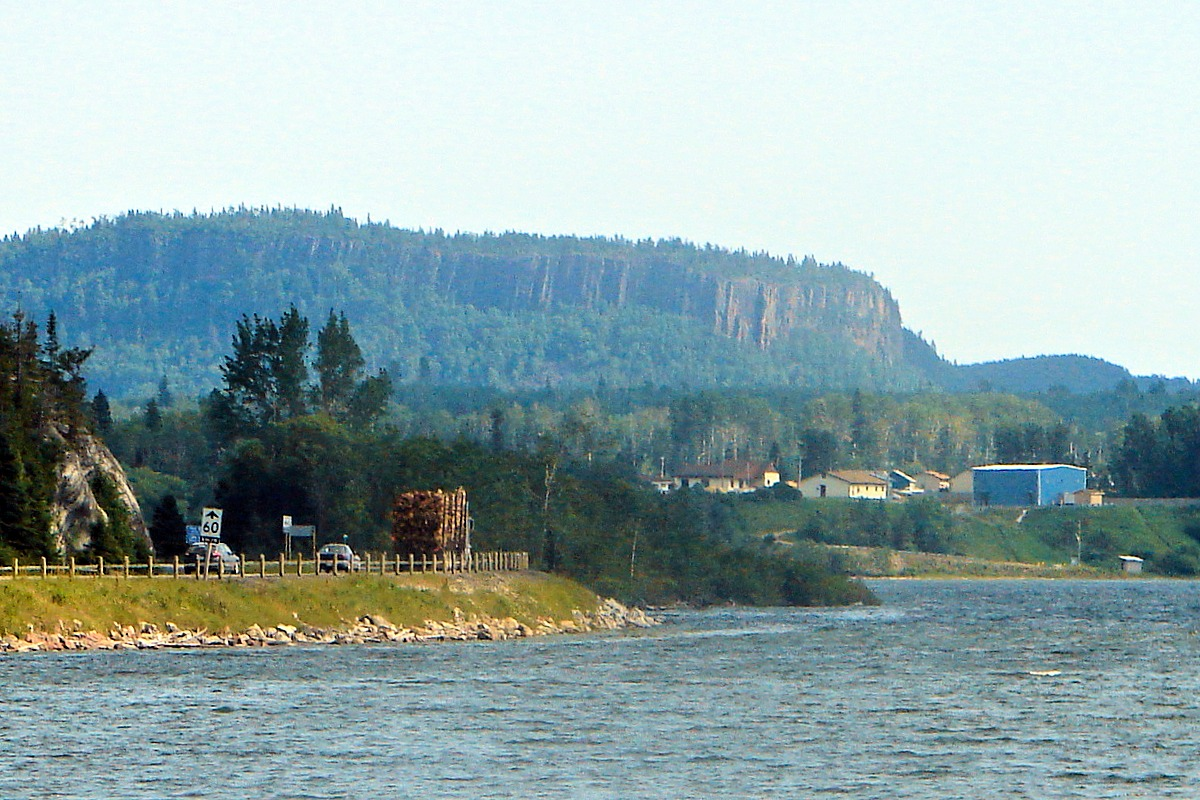

- Location within Ontario
- Coordinates: 49°01′42″N 88°14′22″W
- Country: Canada
- Province: Ontario
- District: Thunder Bay
- First Nation: Red Rock

Area
  - Land: 0.86 km^{2} (0.33 sq mi)

Population (2021)
  - Total: 240
  - Density: 277.8/km^{2} (719/sq mi)

Lake Helen 53A is a First Nations reserve in Thunder Bay District, Ontario, Canada. It is one of two reserves for the Red Rock Indian Band.
