= Namaygoosisagagun First Nation =

Community in Ontario, Canada

Coordinates: 50°17′41″N 89°26′59″W

Location of Collins in Ontario

The Namaygoosisagagun First Nation is a non-status Ojibwa First Nation near Onamakawash Lake, on the north shore of Collins Lake, northwest of Lake Nipigon. The First Nation is applying for official band status and reserve lands through the Indian and Northern Affairs Canada.

== Name ==
The name "Namaygoosisagagun" comes from Namegosi-zaaga'igan, meaning "Trout Lake," which is the Indigenous name for Collins Lake. It is also known as Collins First Nation.

== Population ==
Though Namaygoosisagagun First Nation has about 140 people registered, only about 30 people lived in Collins Lake. Collins Lake was accessible either by Via Rail's The Canadian or by airplane.

== Wildfires ==
The community was destroyed by the Thunder Bay 36 Fire in July 2026. Its over two-dozen residents evacuated on July 13, before the community was consumed by the wildfires. All homes and public buildings were destroyed by the wildfires.

== See also ==
- List of organizations that self-identify as FNIM governments
