= Whitesand First Nation =

First Nation of Ontario, Canada

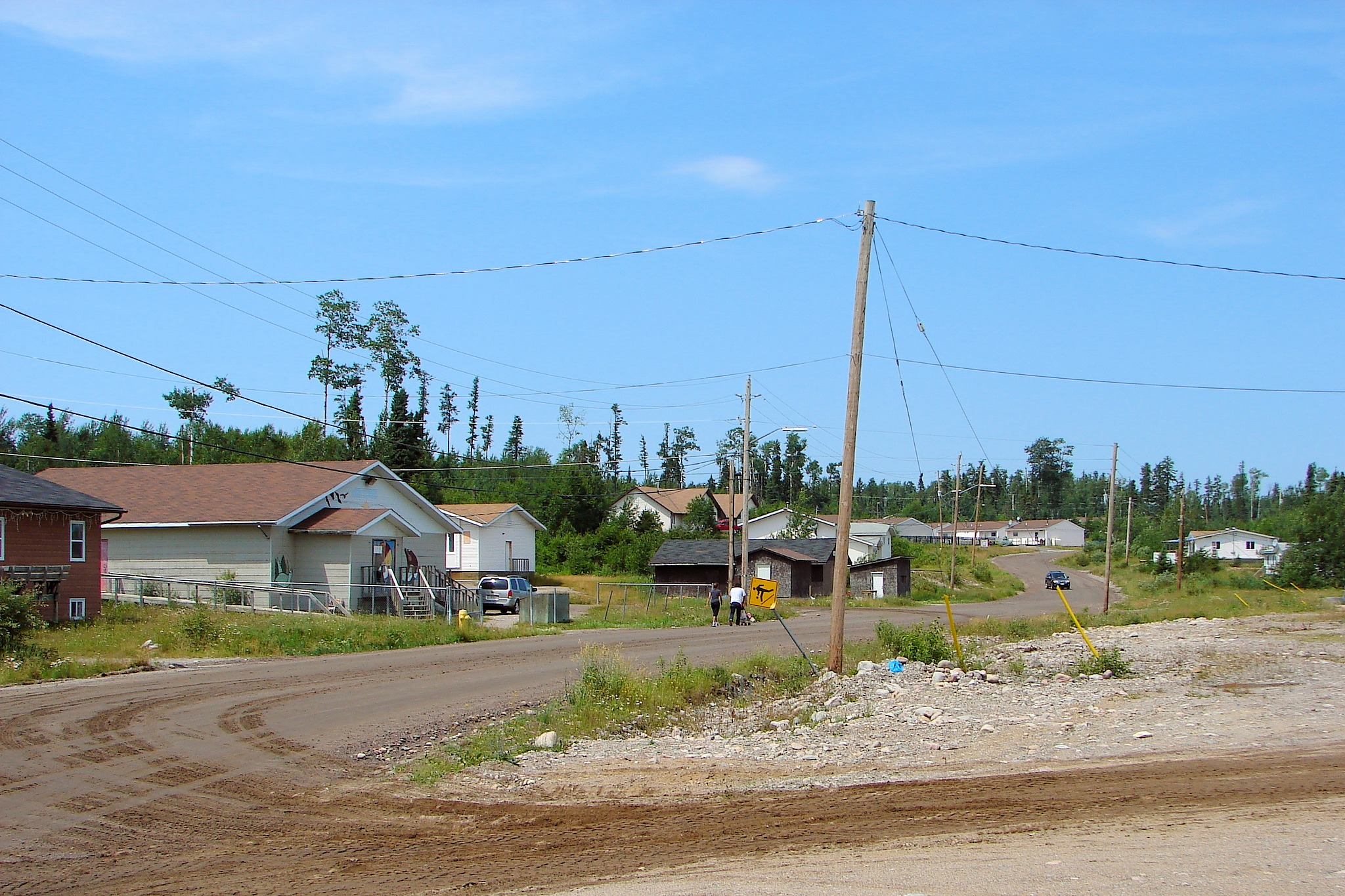

Whitesand First Nation (Severn Ojibwa: ᐗᐱᓀᑲ, romanized: Wapineka) is an Ojibway First Nation reserve in Northern Ontario, Canada. They have reserved for themselves the 249-hectare (615-acre) Whitesand reserve. The community of Armstrong Settlement is their main community, located coterminously with Armstrong, Thunder Bay District, Ontario. In June 2008, their total registered population was 1,086 people, of which their on-reserve population was 311.

Originally located along the northwest shore of Lake Nipigon near Mount St. John, and near the Whitesand River which gives name to the group, Whitesand First Nation was without a home from 1942 when high water levels began eroding the shoreline and flooding out their buildings and burial grounds. Due to the economic influence of the Canadian National Railway, many Whitesand First Nation members settled along the CNR rail line. Largest of these settlements took place in Armstrong. Consequently, when a new Reserve was negotiated, it was located immediately north of that community.

Whitesand is policed by the Ontario Provincial Police, an agreement made between the chief and council and OPP.

== Governance ==
The current electoral leadership of the council consists of Chief Allan Gustufson and six councillors: Barbara Doblej, Jim Doblej, Raymond Kwandibens, Yvette Kwandibens-Toset, Wayne Matchiendagos and James Nayanookeesic. Their term began on October 27, 2007. There will be an election held this year on the 28th and 29 October 2011.

The First Nation is part of the Independent First Nations Alliance of the Nishnawbe Aski Nation, though Whitesand First Nation is located within the Robinson Superior Treaty area. The First Nation is also a member of Waaskiinaysay Ziibi Inc., an economic development corporation made up of five Lake Nipigon First Nations.

== Flag ==
The flag of the Whitesand First Nation.

The flag has a white field bordered by a red stripe. In the white field, there is a stylized eagle on a white cloud (which is raining). Under it is the words "WHITESAND FIRST NATION" in red. The flag's adaption in unknown, however.
