= Armstrong, Thunder Bay District, Ontario =

Armstrong
- compact rural community unincorporated place
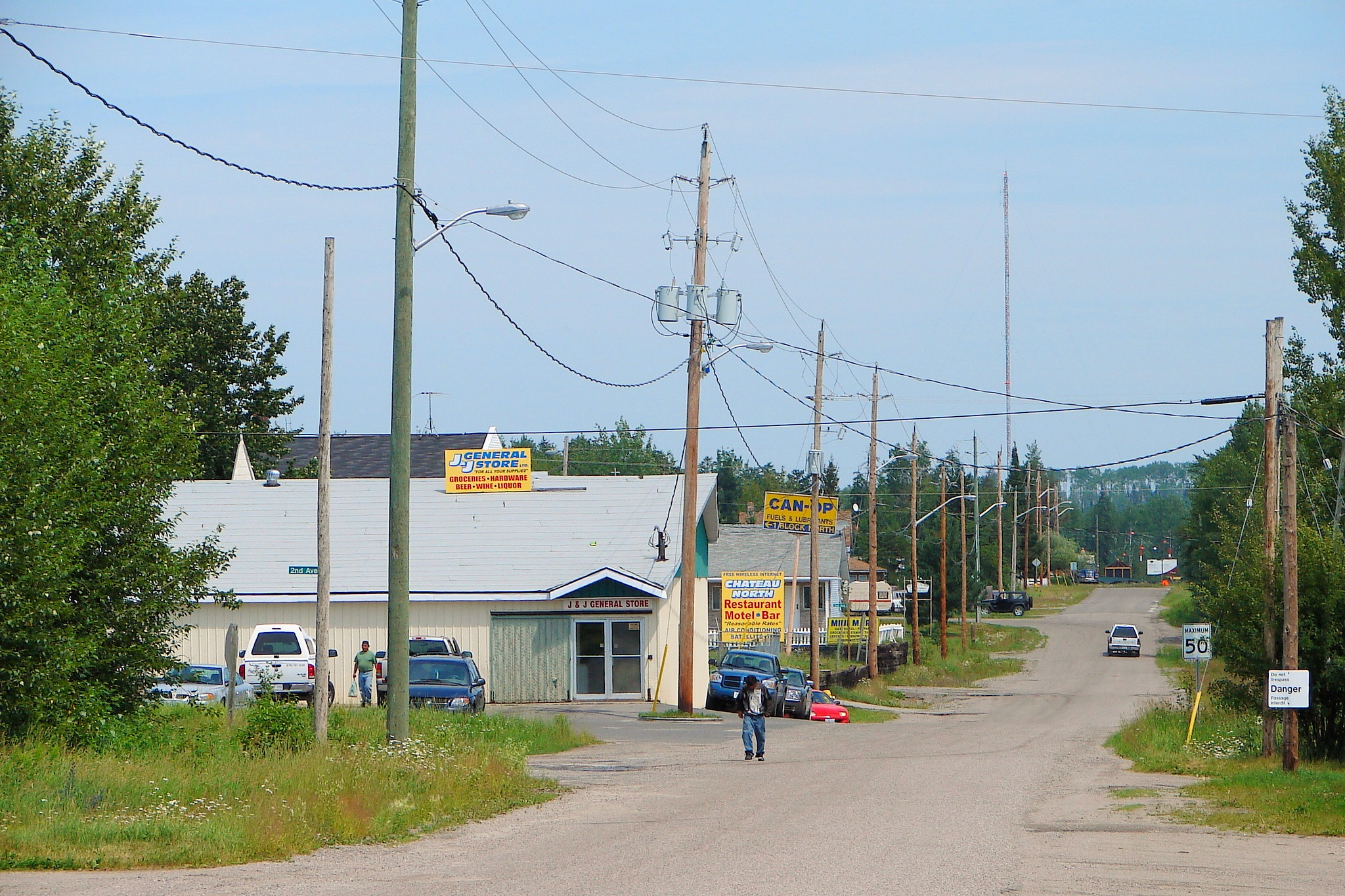

- Location in Ontario
- Coordinates: 50°18′18″N 89°02′31″W
- Country: Canada
- Province: Ontario
- District: Thunder Bay
- Time zone: UTC-5 (Eastern Time Zone)
  - Summer (DST): UTC-4 (Eastern Time Zone)
- Postal Code: P0T 1A0
- Area code: 807

Armstrong is a compact rural community, unincorporated place, and divisional point on the Canadian National Railway transcontinental railway main line in the unorganized portion of Thunder Bay District in Northwestern Ontario, Canada. The Whitesand First Nation's Armstrong Settlement is coterminous to this community. The Armstrong area is a popular tourist destination in the summer for fishing and hunting.

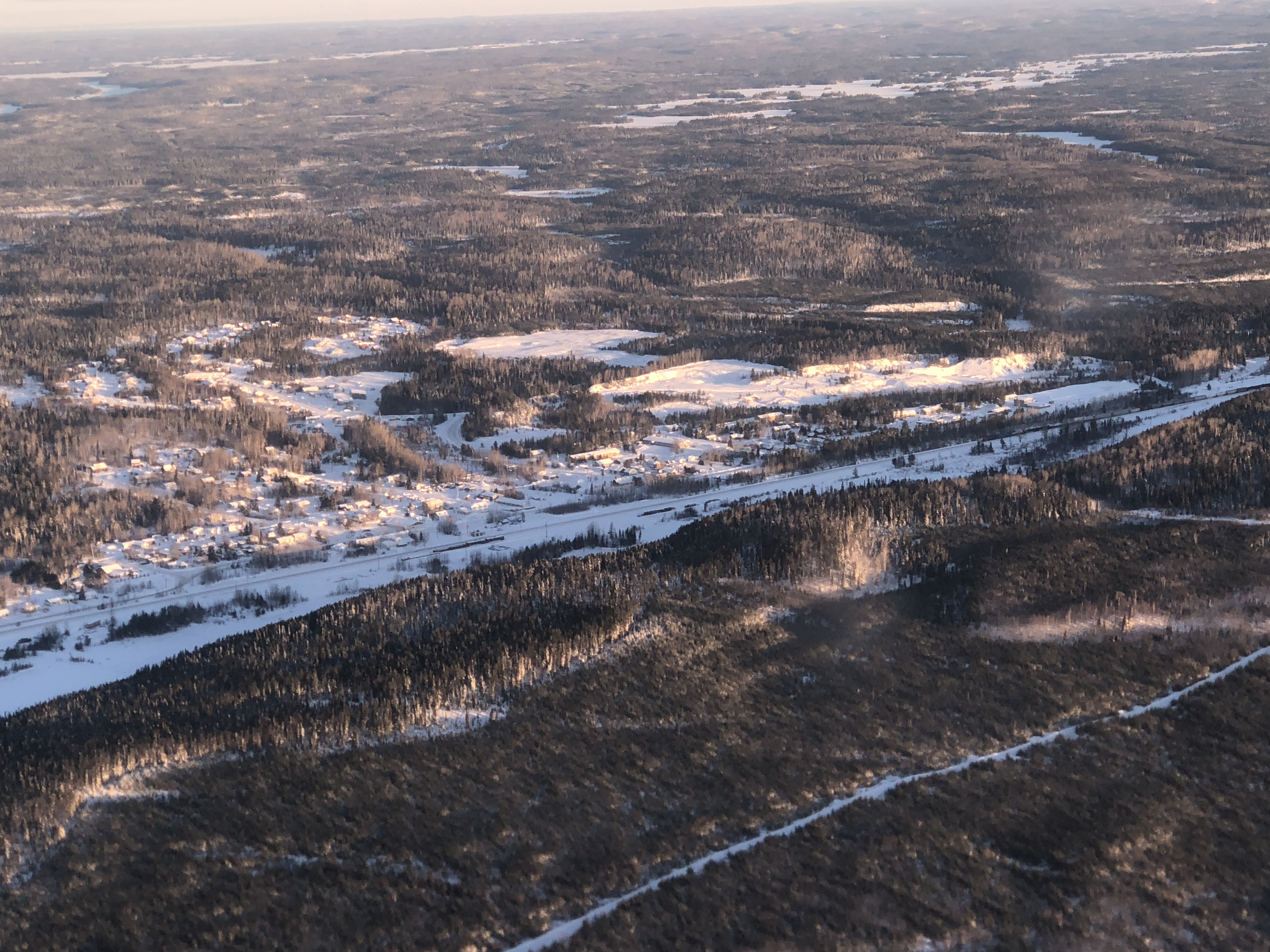
Aerial view of Armstrong, 2017

The community is not part of an incorporated municipality, but is administered by a local services board.

Canadian Forces Station Armstrong, located 1.1 miles (1.8 km) east of Armstrong, was closed in 1974. Later that year the base was sold to private owners and turned into a popular gathering area for the town that included a restaurant and bar, hotel, multiple apartments, garages, and a curling rink. The area, known as D&L, was closed and abandoned in 1993 and remains that way today.

The town of Armstrong currently has a public school, two restaurants, a Canada Post post office, a clinic, a Mini Mart gas station and motel, and the Armstrong General Store (formerly the J&J General Store, from 1961 to 2015).

== Demographics ==
In the 2021 Census of Population conducted by Statistics Canada, Armstrong had a population of 146 living in 60 of its 208 total private dwellings, a change of −24.4% from its 2016 population of 193. With a land area of 323.85 km^{2} (125.04 sq mi), it had a population density of 0.5/km^{2} (1.2/sq mi) in 2021.

According to the Canada 2016 Census, the community had a population of 193, down from 220 in 2011, a decrease of 12.3%. There are 186 dwellings of which 84 are occupied by usual residents.

== Transportation ==
Armstrong is accessible via Highway 527, which extends 235 kilometres (146 mi) north from Highway 11/17 near Thunder Bay. It takes about three hours to get to Armstrong by car from Thunder Bay.

Armstrong Airport is located 4.5 nautical miles (8.3 kilometres; 5.2 miles) east southeast of Armstrong.

The Via Rail Canadian train travels through and stops on request in Armstrong.
