= Lac des Mille Lacs First Nation =

First Nation reserve in Ontario

Coordinates: 48°20′40″N 89°18′10″W

Lac des Mille Lacs First Nation, also known as Nizaatikoong (from Ne-azaadiikaang meaning "At a Point of Land Abundant with Poplars"), is a Saulteaux Ojibwe First Nation band government. The nation owns two reserves in the Thunder Bay District of Ontario, Lac des Mille Lacs 22A1 on the northeastern shore of Lac des Mille Lacs and Lac des Mille Lacs 22A2 at the junction of the Seine and Firesteel Rivers.

Because of past flooding by various dam projects in the region, the nation does not reside on either territory, but is instead dispersed throughout Northwestern Ontario, with smaller numbers residing elsewhere in Canada or the United States. Its governance office is located on the territory of the Fort William First Nation near Thunder Bay.

The First Nation, which is governed by a custom governance code rather than under the Canadian Indian Act, has established a goal of rebuilding its own community on the Seine River site, and released a site analysis feasibility study in 2006. The nation has an outstanding land claim pending negotiation with the federal and provincial governments.

Leo Baskatawang, an Iraq War veteran from Dryden who is a registered member of the Lac des Mille Lacs nation, staged a 4,400 km March for Justice in 2012, marching from Vancouver to Ottawa with a copy of the Indian Act chained to his body, to raise awareness of the plight of the community and other First Nations peoples.

The nation had a registered population of 579 in 2013, according to Aboriginal Affairs and Northern Development Canada.

The First Nation is affiliated with the Bimose Tribal Council and the Grand Council of Treaty 3.
