= Lac des Mille Lacs 22A1 =

- Indian reserve
- Lac des Mille Lacs Indian Reserve No. 22A1
- Location within Ontario
- Coordinates: 48°53′18″N 90°22′17″W
- Country: Canada
- Province: Ontario
- District: Thunder Bay
- First Nation: Lac des Mille Lacs

Area
  - Land: 17.32 km^{2} (6.69 sq mi)

Population (2021)
  - Total: 0
  - Density: 0/km^{2} (0/sq mi)
- Website: lacdesmillelacsfirstnation.ca

Lac des Mille Lacs 22A1 is a First Nations reserve on the shores of Lac des Mille Lacs in Thunder Bay District in northwestern Ontario, Canada. It is one of two reserves for the Lac des Mille Lacs First Nation.
