= Seine River Diversion =

- Location of the end of the Seine River Diversion in Ontario.

Location
- Country: Canada
- Province: Ontario
- Region: Northwestern Ontario
- District: Rainy River District

Physical characteristics
- Source: Raft Lake
  - coordinates: 48°55′03″N 91°32′41″W
  - elevation: 414.5 m (1,360 ft)
- Mouth: Seine River
  - coordinates: 48°46′03″N 91°44′13″W
  - elevation: 384 m (1,260 ft)

The Seine River Diversion is a river diversion in Rainy River District in northwestern Ontario, Canada located near Atikokan. It was built to divert water around open-pit hematite iron ore mining at Steep Rock Lake beginning in 1943.

The Seine River near the town of Atikokan originally flowed into Steep Rock Lake from Moose Lake over Moose Falls on the Steep Rock Moraine, where a hydroelectric generating station was built in 1926. The building of the dam created the Marmion Lake reservoir, which then acted as the main method for regulating water flow to the Moose generating station, and to the Calm and Sturgeon Falls generating stations further downstream built at the same time.

In 1943, the Seine River Diversion was undertaken to enable the open pit mining of a high-grade body of iron ore under the middle arm of Steep Rock Lake by Inland Steel Company and its subsidiary Caland Ore Canada. The diversion had several elements:

- the Moose generating station was dismantled and the waterflow stopped up
- a channel was cut through the height of land at the northwest of the Marmion Lake reservoir from Raft Lake to Finlayson Lake and the Raft Lake Dam was constructed at (see source coordinates in information box at right) to control the flow The water flowed downstream through a natural channel to Little Falls Lake
- Wagita Bay Dam was built at 48°49′29″N 91°40′15″W to separate the diversion water flowing through Little Falls Lake from Wagita Bay at the northwest of Steeprock Lake
- the water then flowed through Colin Lake and over Valerie Falls to

In 1952, several additions were undertaken:

- dredged material and overburden from the mining operations were used to create several dams to split Marmion Lake into Upper Marmion Lake (5,525 hectares or 13,653 acres), which connected to the Raft Lake Dam outflow, and Lower Marmion Lake (3,960 hectares or 9,785 acres). The Marmion Sluiceway was built to regular water flow into the lower lake from the upper lake, and allowed Lower Marmion Lake to be used as a settling basin, reducing the opportunity for the overburden to enter the Seine River system
- the height of the Wagita Bay Dam was increased

There is one named tributary on the diversion: Hardtack Creek enters Finlayson Lake as a right tributary of the Seine River.

== Sources ==
- "Seine River Diversion". Geographical Names Data Base. Natural Resources Canada.
- "Topographic Map sheets 52B13, 52B14". Atlas of Canada. Natural Resources Canada. 2010-02-04.
- Sowa, Victor A; Adamson, R Bruce; Chow, Allan W (2001). "Water management of the Steep Rock Iron Mines at Atikokan, Ontario during construction, operations, and after mine abandonment" (PDF). Proceedings of the 25th Annual British Columbia Mine Reclamation Symposium. OCLC 443748018.
