= Firesteel River =

Firesteel River may refer to:

- Firesteel River (British Columbia), Canada
- Firesteel River (Ontario), Canada
- Firesteel River (Michigan), United States
