= Steep Rock Lake =

- Location within Ontario
- Location: Ontario, Canada
- Coordinates: 48.79°N 91.67°W
- Type: lake

Steep Rock Lake is a body of water near the township of Atikokan, northern Ontario, Canada. It was originally fed by the Seine River.

== Geography ==
Steep Rock Lake and the surrounding region was carved out by retreating glaciers. The lake was carved out as a sprawling "M" shape and is 14 miles long with a surface area of 7 square miles. The lake lies 6–7 km (4 miles) north of Atikokan and 215–225 km (135–140 miles) west of Thunder Bay. The ridges around the water rose 25 meters in places, often with visible outcrops of iron. The area straddles two major fault systems: The Quetico Fault and the Steep Rock Lake Fault systems. Active speculation about mining the area began as early as 1885, when land deposits were bought by the McKellar and Graham families. However, a patchwork terrain of deep soil, swamp land, and boulders hindered exploitation. Julian Cross, a mining prospector, later came to the area in 1926 and in 1937 through exploratory drilling located a major orebody under Steep Rock Lake.

During World War II, a program was implemented to drain the lake. This diversion of the river allowed open-pit mining of hematite iron ore under the middle arm of the lake by Steep Rock Iron Mines Limited and the East arm was mined by Inland Steel Company through its subsidiary Caland Ore Company Limited. By 1949, the site was producing a million tons of ore per year and had an estimated 500 million tons of ore deposits.

This lake was the site of an elaborate UFO hoax dubbed the "Little Green Men of Steep Rock Lake" in 1950. In 1957, a caribou antler was discovered in the exposed silt. This specimen may have been deposited here by a barren-ground caribou at the end of the last ice age, demonstrating that the species once lived in this region. These caribou are now found much further to the north.

== Early Mining Efforts & Discovery ==
During the war years, in both Canada and the United States, was accorded to the steel industry. One result of this was a revival of iron-ore mining in Ontario, with one of the most difficult and spectacular mining projects ever undertaken in this country-and perhaps in any other. The first speculation of iron ore being under Steep Rock Lake was in 1891, when Professor Henry L. Smyth, of Harvard University, came across boulders containing iron ore on the south shore of the lake. He mapped the lake and found no such boulders on its north shore. He concluded that if there was iron to be found in worthwhile quantities, it would be beneath the lake. Exploration and development would not occur until 1938. On January 6, 1938, Joseph Errington, Julian Cross and W.S. Morlock founded the Steerola Expedition Company Limited to finance a drilling project on Steep Rock Lake led by Julian Cross. In March of the same year, Cross discovered a body of iron ore under Steep Rock Lake after 6 test holes were drilled. The find confirmed what has previously been suspected. In the summer of 1938, the Ontario Department of Mines sent a geological party to survey and map the Steep Rock Lake geology using an electro-magnetic survey to outline the ore bodies. The Steerola Expedition Company did not have the necessary funds to develop a mine, so Steep Rock Iron Mines Limited was created February 24, 1939 with Joseph Errington as president and managing director, Julian Cross as vice-president and Watkin Samuel as Consulting Engineer. Major-General Donald Hogarth, W.S. Morlock and R.D. Bradshaw were brought in during this period to be Directors of the company.

=== Early Mining Efforts ===
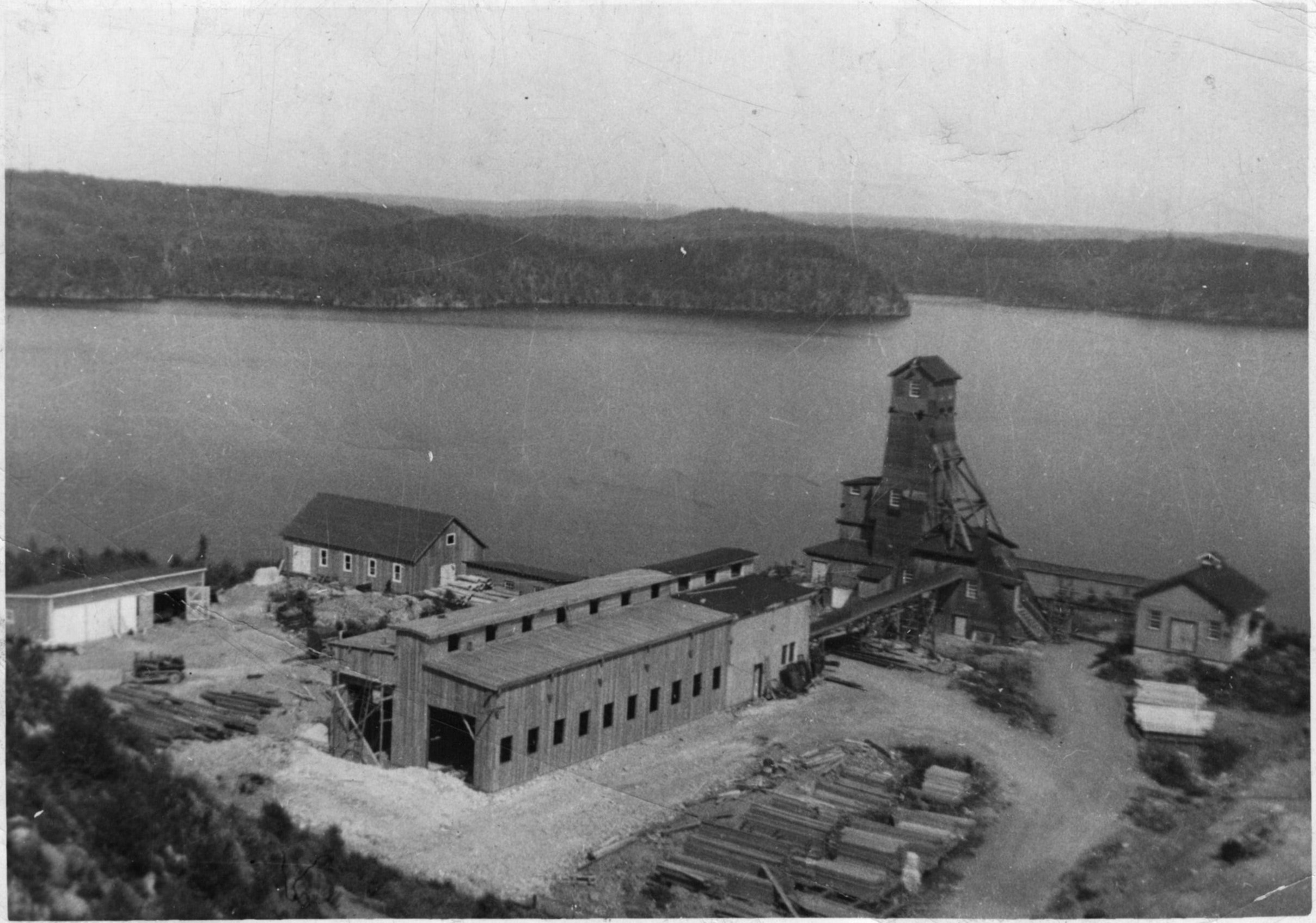
Early Mining Efforts at Steep Rock Lake

In the early days of mining Steep Rock Lake, plans were made to sink a small shaft 1,400 ft. below the lake level and drill into the orebody to test the quality of the ore. July 1939 saw the collaring of the No.1 shaft with Morson Scarth (Pop) Fotheringham, then a mining engineer, in charge. The sinking went smoothly, however by August 1940 the first signs of problems appeared. It had become impossible to keep water out of the shaft and this led to the project being abandoned. At this time a new plan was already being looked into by the engineers of Steep Rock Iron Mines to drain the lake by diverting the Seine River. There was a large amount of skepticism for the plan, mainly from the U.S.A. about the ability to complete the project. Two American consultants were brought in, Hugh Roberts (geologist) and William Crago (Mining Engineer) to report on the ore reserves and the plan for mining the ore. The report, presented in March 1941 gave Joseph Errington and Donald Hogarth the necessary basis to approach American Financiers for the money needed to move the plan forward. As negotiations continued into early 1942, Joseph Errington died of a heart attack on the way to a presentation in New York. Donald Hogarth then stepped into the presidential role at Steep Rock Iron Mines.

== The Seine River Diversion ==
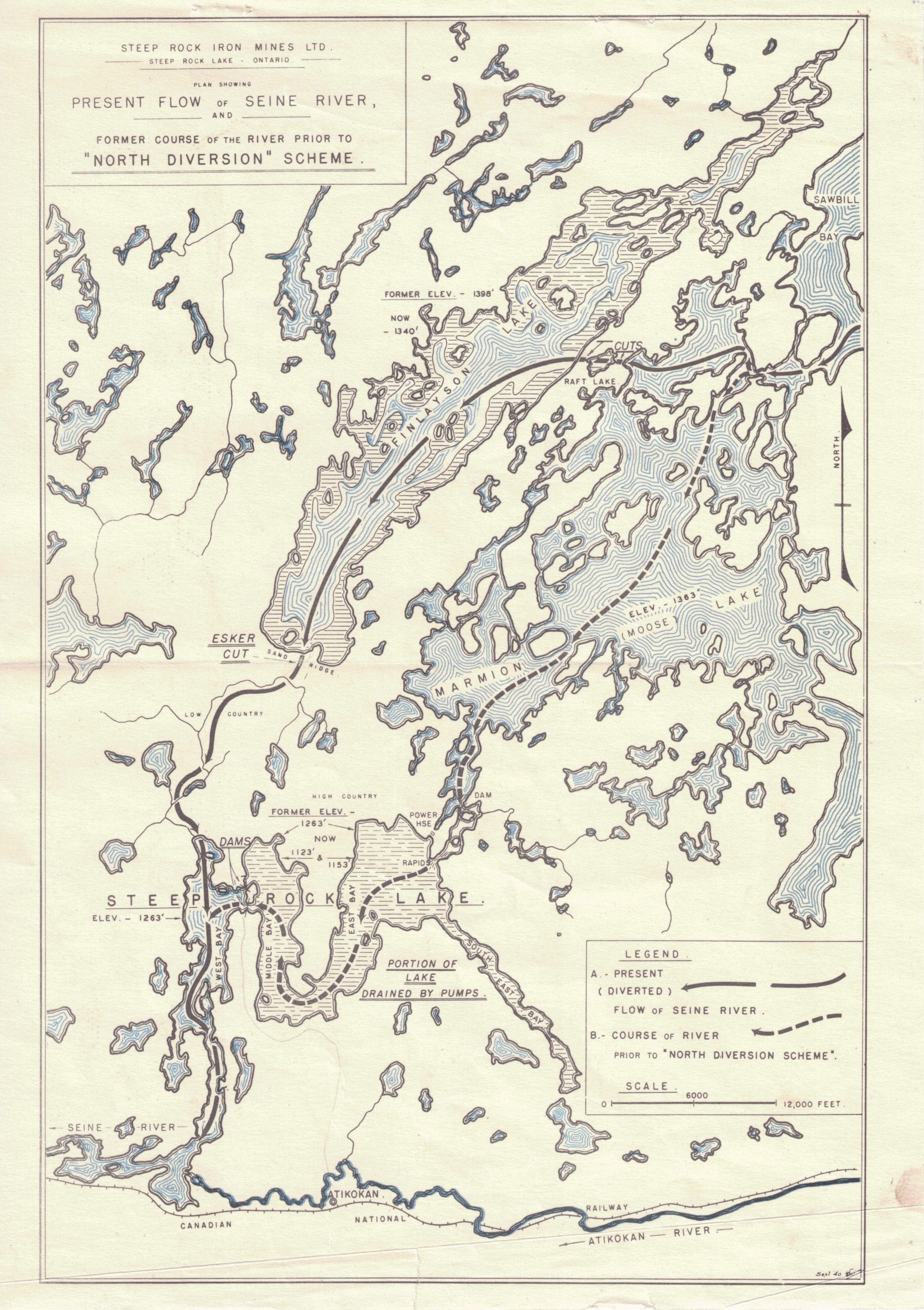
Map showing the present flow of the Seine River and the Former course of the river prior to diversion.

In March 1941, negotiations with the Ontario Government for the rights to dam off Steep Rock Lake were underway. The negotiations involved Steep Rock Iron Mines Limited, Ontario Hydro and Ontario-Minnesota Pulp and Paper Company. A special act of legislation was passed on July 27, 1942, called "An Act Respecting the Hydro Electric Power Commission of Ontario, Steep Rock Iron Mines Limited and the Ontario-Minnesota Pulp and Paper Company Limited." This allowed Steep Rock Iron Mines to dam up the area surrounding the lake. By March 1943, financial arrangements were completed for the diversion plan and the project is started. Charlie Pitts and his construction company (C.A. Pitts Construction Co.) was hired to build the roadways to Finlayson Lake. Patrick Harrison and his crew were hired to dig the tunnel that would lower the water level of Finlayson Lake. On July 23, 1943, a plug is blown at the bottom of Finlayson Lake which leads into a tunnel connecting to the Seine River to lower the water level in Finlayson. Through the fall of 1943, three dams were constructed and the first pumps were put into action in the middle arm of Steep Rock Lake to dewater that section. By May the water level had dropped 75 ft. Raft Lake (situated between Finlayson and Marmion Lake) was also lowered to connect the two larger lakes together to complete the diversion plan. All through the summer and winter of 1943, millions of tons of rock, gravel and earth were moved. More than a million cubic yards of rock had to be removed to create the canal between Raft Lake and Finlayson. When completed, it was six hundred yards long, a hundred feet wide, and as much as ninety feet deep in places. By the new year, Both Raft and Finlayson Lakes had been drained to the required levels, dams were built-including the dam between Marmion Lake and Raft Lake known as the Raft Lake Dam- and the cuts and canals had been completed. On January 28, 1944, the Raft Lake and Finlayson Diversion cuts were blown, which rerouted the water flow away from Steep Rock Lake. The lake was finally an isolated body of water and the job of pumping and mining the lake bottom could begin.

== The Mines of Steep Rock Lake ==
=== "B" Ore Zone (Errington Mine) ===
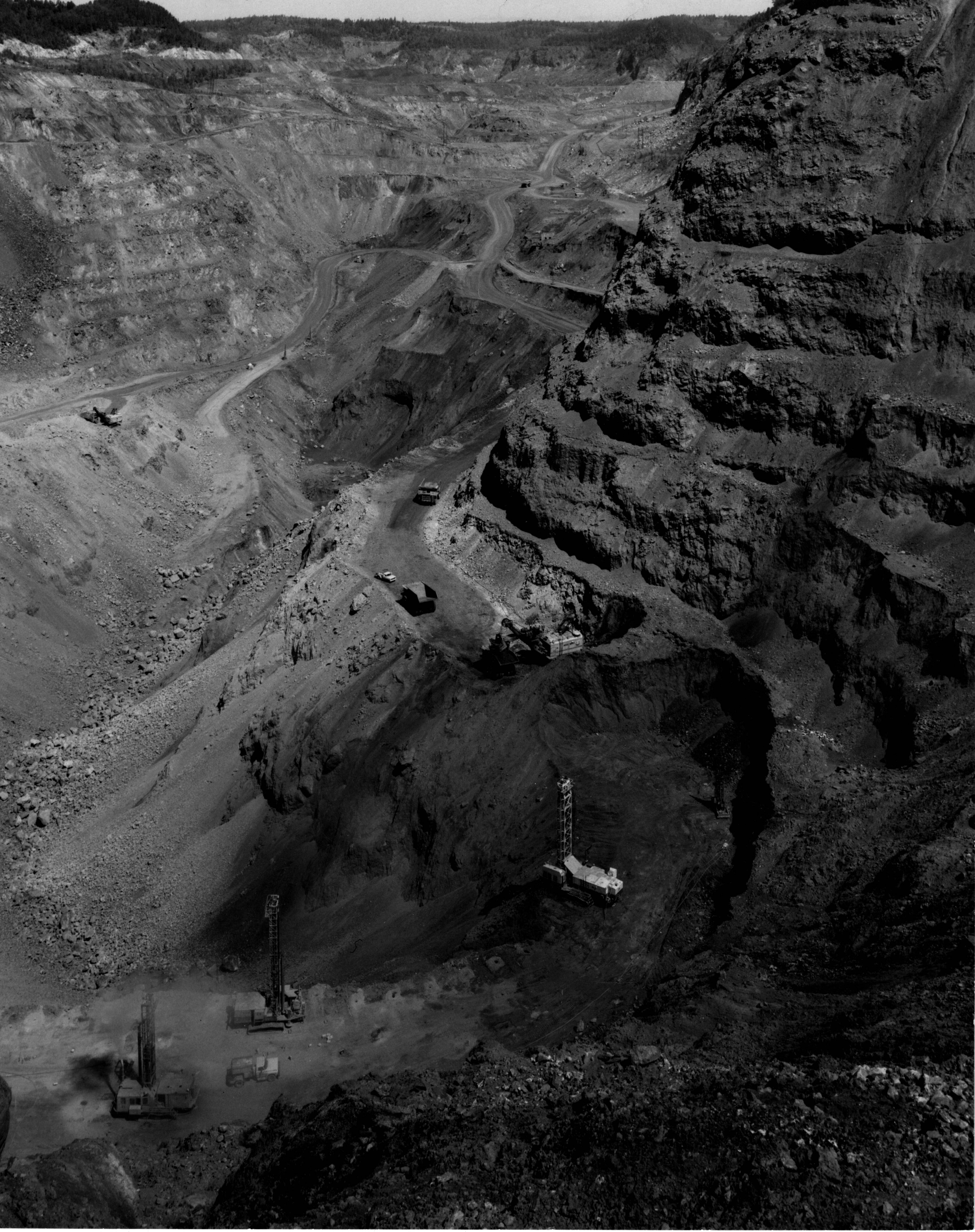
Errington Open Pit Mine

The spring and summer of 1944 saw the pumping of Steep Rock Lake to expose the lake bottom. To dredge the silt from the lake bottom to expose the ore body, a pumping barge was modified with a suction dredge on it so that the dredging could begin. The ore zone was later renamed to the Errington Mine, in honor of the first president and one of the founders of Steep Rock Iron Mines. In September 1944, enough silt and water had been removed to expose the ore body and mining began. The first load of iron ore to leave the mine was October 3, 1944. It went out of Errington via Canadian National Railway to Fort Frances. It was loaded onto ships at Fort Frances and travelled to Duluth, Minnesota as the ore docks at Port Arthur were not completed by this point. This shipment represented the first time that iron ore mined in Northwestern Ontario crossed the international boarder creating a new trade economy. Mining continued up until December 1953, when the open pit mine was shut down. It had reached the economic depth of an open pit mine. Surveys showed that the orebody extended down below the practical depths for open pit mining and the engineers began to look at the feasibility of underground mining. December 1953 saw the collaring of the Errington Underground mine. The underground mine continued operations until 1973 when it was shut down due to low productivity, high ore costs and grade control problems. During the operation of the Errington Mine, there were upgrades to the mining equipment that was used. When the mine started, drilling was done using the same Keystone churn drills that were used in the diversion project, the 1 1/2 to 2 1/2 cubic yard diesel and electric shovels were used and the haulage of ore was done with a fleet of 15-ton capacity Euclid's. Out of necessity, Steep Rock, gradually acquired new equipment, including more shovels and trucks, until they had the production capacity to meet the tonnage requirements. In 1948, Steep Rock Iron Mines obtained a fleet of 20-ton Euclid trucks to replace the 15-ton trucks. Upgrades continued until 10-cubic-yard shovels and 100-ton capacity trucks were used.

=== "A" Ore Zone (Hogarth Mine) ===
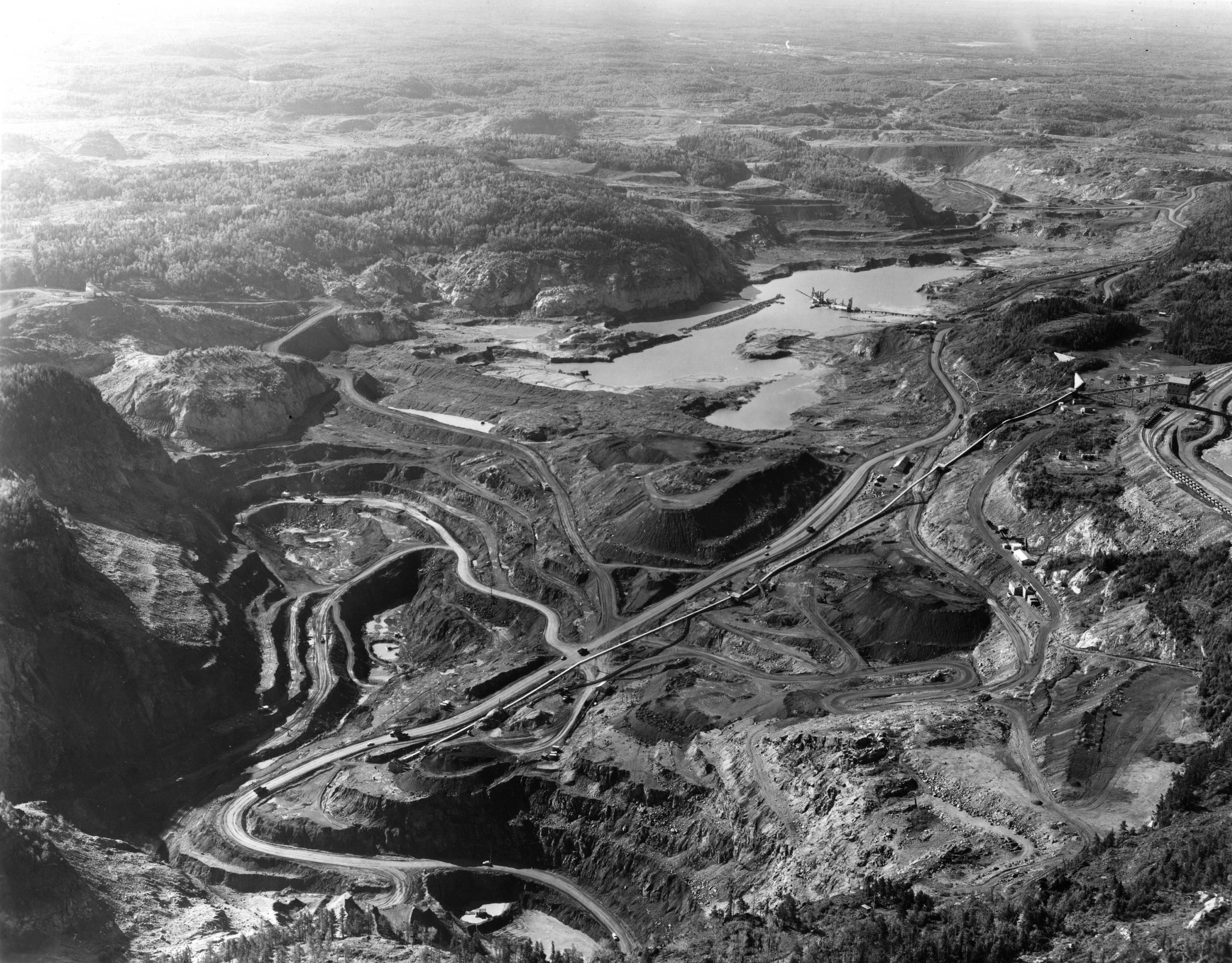
Aerial of the Hogarth Open Pit located in the foreground.

The second mine to be opened by Steep Rock Iron Mines was the "A" Ore Zone. It was later renamed the Hogarth Mine in honor of Major-General Donald Hogarth who was the second president of Steep Rock Iron Mines and is credited with obtaining the funds for the diversion. In 1949, Construction Aggregates Corporation (CAC) was hired to help with the dredging in the "A" ore zone. CAC brought in a 30-inch all electric dredge called the "Nebraska"-later renamed "Steep Rock"- to assist in the dredging project. The dredge was launched into the "A" ore zone on November 2, 1950, along with a smaller dredge named "La Seine". In June 1950, Donald Hogarth died and Morson Scarth "Pop" Fotheringham took over as president of Steep Rock Iron Mines. In the spring of 1951, discoloration of the Seine River from the dredging overburden reached a point of concern and accusations of pollution from outdoor groups and residents reach the newspapers. To fix the discoloration issue, a second diversion was planned. It would divert the river from the top of Wagita Bay to the bottom of the Tracy Rapids. This diversion was opened May 1, 1952. In the months following CAC acquired another large dredge as the smaller "La Seine" dredge could not keep up with the demand. The dredge "New York" was operating near Chicago when it was purchased for use in Steep Rock. The dredge was dismantled, sent to Steep Rock, reassembled and launched October 10, 1952. It was renamed "Marmion". In that same month the dredge "Steep Rock" uncovered the first ore in the ore zone. By July 1953 enough of the ore had been exposed that mining could begin. The first shipment of iron ore out of Hogarth Mine was September 1, 1953. It was sent via Canadian National Railway to the ore docks in Port Arthur, Ontario. The ore was then loaded onto steamships and shipped down to the U.S. and other cities along the Lake Superior shipping lines. Shortly afterwards, in February 1954, the dredging project was completed in the Hogarth Mine. The final mine to be opened by Steep Rock Iron Mines was the "G" ore zone. To do this the dredges needed to be moved into that ore zone. The plan that was developed was an overland move known as "Operation Up and Over". The move occurred in March 1954. The Hogarth Mine also saw the opening of an ore improvement plant in 1958. This plant separated the iron ore into coarse and fine products through a gravity screening method. This allowed for the coarser ore to be bought at a premium price because it was more uniform in size and grade. It resulted in a more efficient blast furnace operation at the steel mills. The Hogarth Open Pit was in operation until 1978 when it closed due to an economic drop in iron ore.

=== "Operation Up and Over" Dredge Move ===
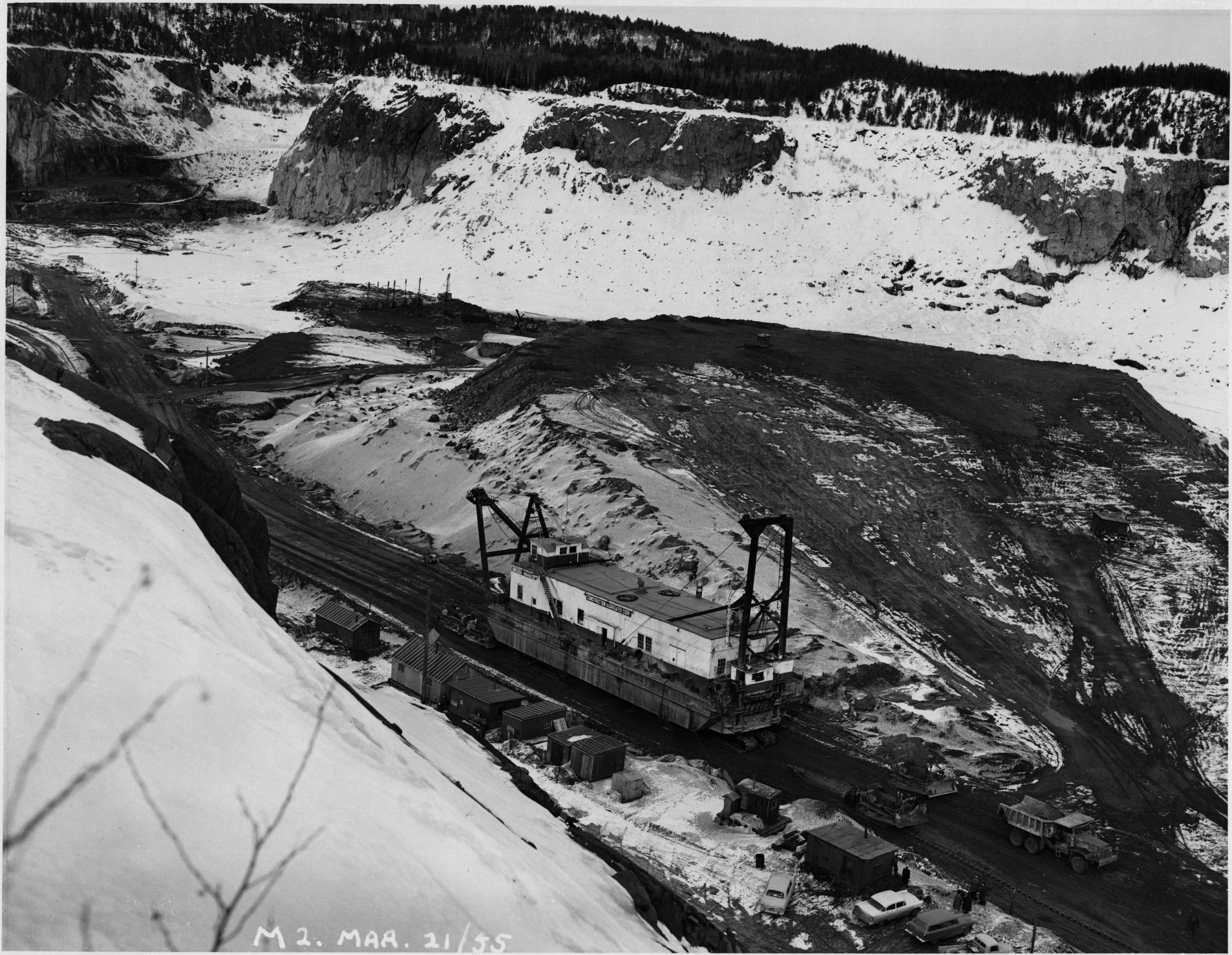
Dredge "Marmion" being moved during Operation Up and Over.

Once dredging was completed in the Hogarth Mine pit, the challenge then became moving the two dredges into the final ore zone that was to be mined by Steep Rock Iron Mines. The plan that was settled upon was an overland move of the dredges from Hogarth to the "G" Ore Zone because it was the most economic. The dredges "Steep Rock" and "Marmion" were prepped by adding continuous tracks to the base of the dredges. The dredges were then attached to bulldozers and other heavy machinery by long metal cables. The dredges began their overland move in March 1954. The distance was two miles and contained a vertical lift of 240 ft. There were 8% grades and one sharp corner that could cause delays if not planned properly. The move took two weeks to complete and the dredges arrived at the "G" ore zone without any problems.

=== "G" Ore Zone (Roberts Mine) ===
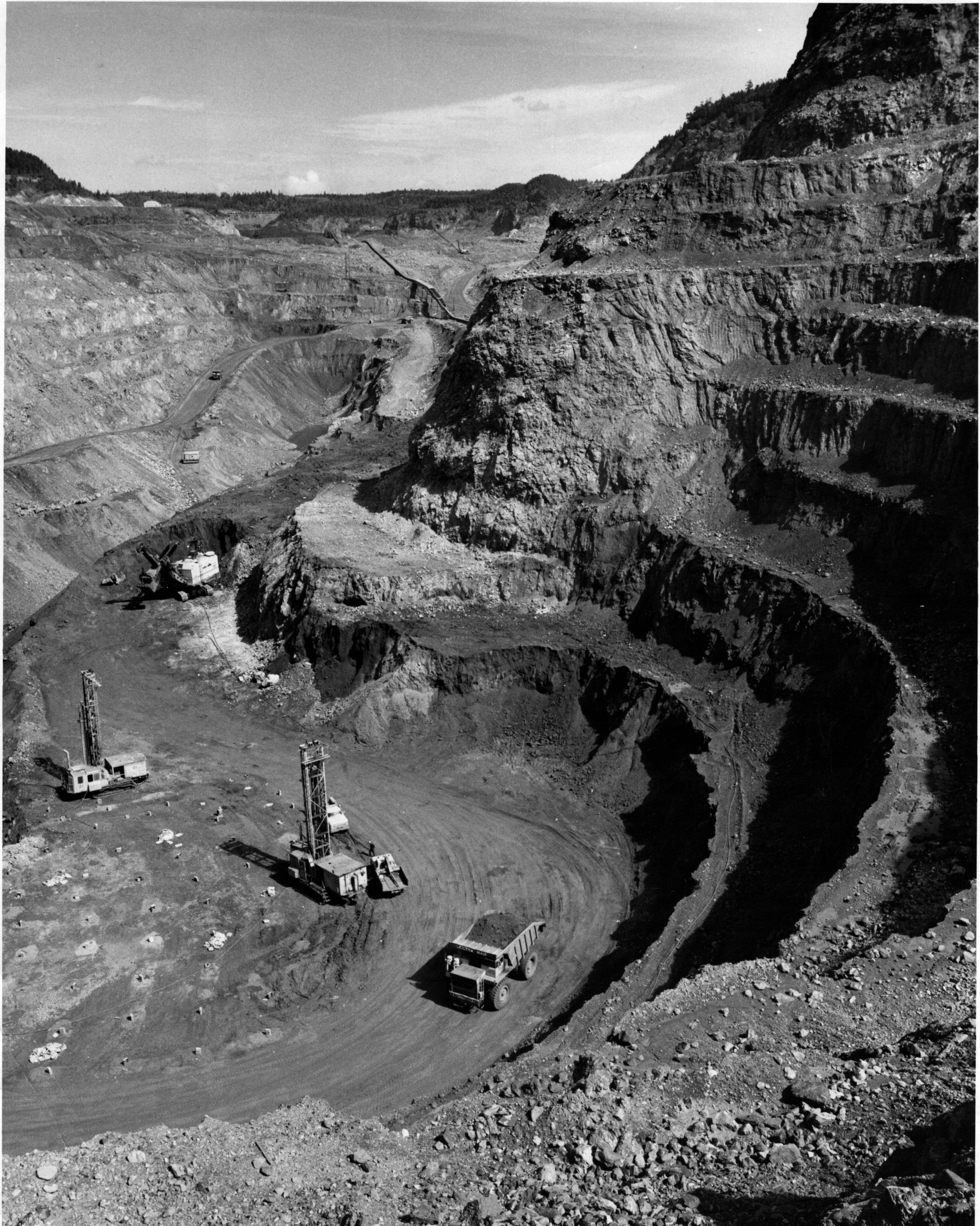
View of mining in the Roberts Open Pit Mine.

The final ore zone to be mined by Steep Rock Iron Mines was the "G" ore zone-renamed the Roberts Mine after Hugh Roberts, geologist of Steep Rock Iron Mines- which was situated in the middle of the western portion of the Steep Rock Range, midway between the Hogarth and Errington orebodies. The dredging of the "G" ore zone started in 1954 after the two dredges "Steep Rock" and "Marmion" were moved. The dredging continued until 1962. The mine was renamed Roberts Mine in 1961. The first load of iron ore was shipped from the mine in 1964. During this time, Steep Rock Iron Mines entered into the modern mining equipment and methods. The first 100-ton electric wheel haulage trucks were used at Steep Rock along with large 10- and 11- cubic-yard shovels. In addition to the equipment, many of the advances in slope stability and open pit design that were widely used in Canadian mining were developed at Steep Rock. The Roberts Mine was in operation until 1972, when the economic limit of the ore reserves was reached. When the mine closed, it was one of the deepest open pit mines in Canada at the time, with a vertical depth of 1100 feet. More than 18,000,000 tons of ore were mined during the life of this mine.

== Caland Ore Company Limited ==
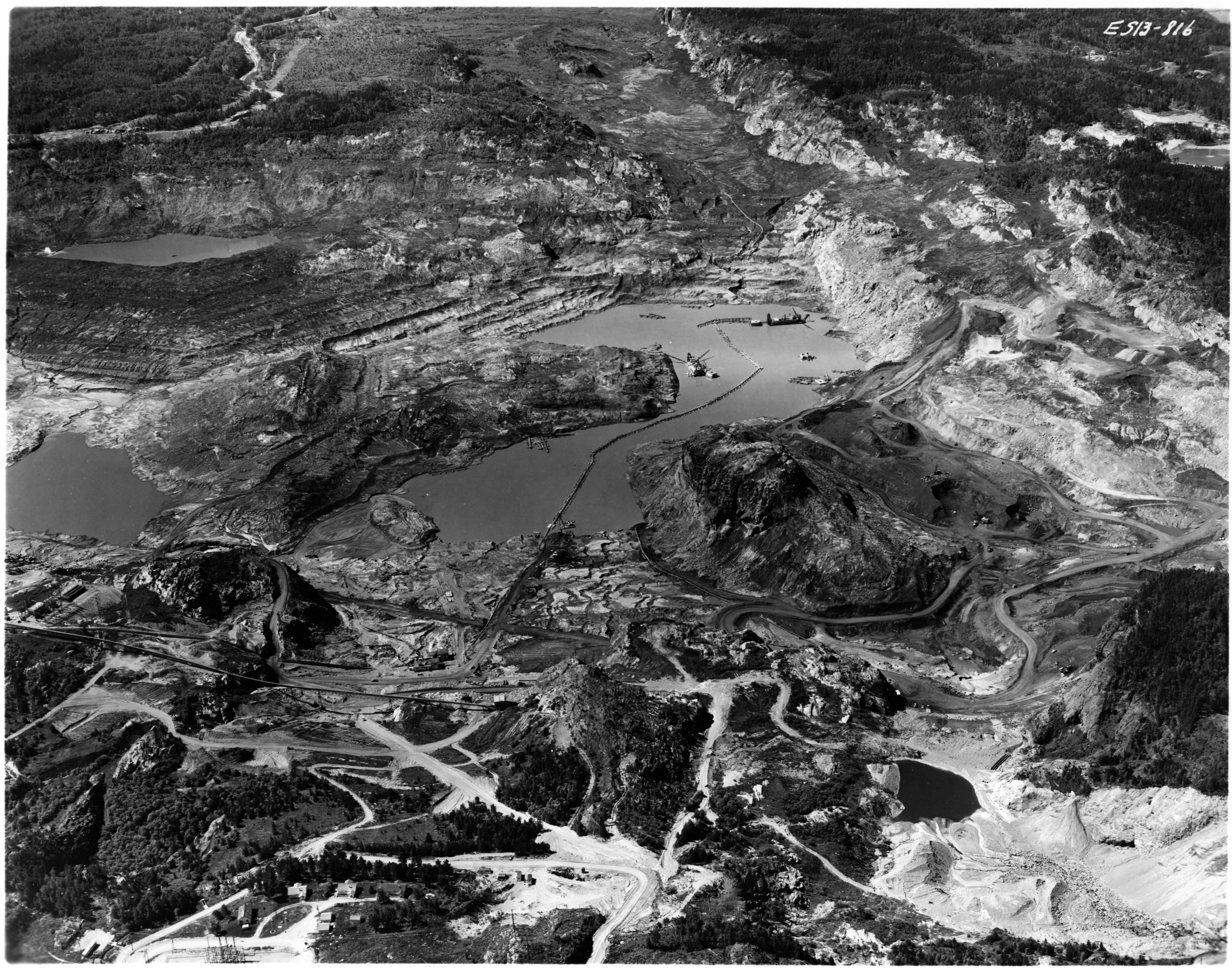
Aerial of Caland Open Pit Mine

The Steep Rock directors decided that the east arm of Steep Rock Lake would be made available to other operators on a royalty basis. Inland Steel Company, a large American steel producer located in Chicago, became interested in the Steep Rock deposits. The ore body that was opened to being leased was the "C" ore body. Inland Steel first approached Steep Rock in January 1949 when two representatives went to Steep Rock to see the mining operations. Later both parties entered into negotiations for exploring the "C" ore body. Negotiations continued until December 8, 1949, when a lease was agreed upon. The terms of the lease included Royalties of 95 cents per ton, and the minimum tonnage was set at 3% of the proven reserves. The announcement was made January 12, 1950. Inland began an exploratory drilling program at the "C" ore body and in June 1951, it was apparent that there was no more than 27 million ton available. Inland went back to re-negotiate with Steep Rock about the terms of the lease. In October 1952, a new agreement was made. Inland created a wholly owned subsidiary to mine the ore body. The company was named Caland Ore Company Limited. Between the period of 1955–57, dams were constructed on Marmion Lake, the southeast arm of Steep Rock Lake and other locations around the area. Construction Aggregates Corporation was hired on to help with the dredging project at the "C" ore body. Two dredges were commissioned to work in the "C" ore body. The dredge "Clarence B. Randall"-named after the chairman of the Board of Inland Steel- was launched on July 15, 1954. The other dredge "Joseph L. Block"- named after the President of Inland Steel- was launched on September 1, 1954. The two dredges were the largest at the time with the hull measuring 176 feet long by 50 feet wide with a depth of 14 feet. The dredging project was completed in 1960. A total of 160 million cubic yards of overburden (silt, water, rocks, etc.) were removed from the "C" and "D" ore zones. During Caland's mining operations, a pelletizing plant was constructed on site in 1965 at a cost of $17.5 million. Caland attempted an underground mine in 1957, however, water conditions, soft rock conditions and weak iron ore markets at the time made underground mining an unfavorable situation. In 1977, Caland moved into termination planning and developed a shutdown strategy based on involvement and participation. In November 1978, pit termination activities began. In 1979, the Pellet plant termination activities began along with the closure of the open pit. By April 1980 the Pellet plant shut down completely. The termination of Steep Rock Iron Mines and the Caland Ore Company was due to the cost of iron ore dropping and a surplus of iron ore pellets in the Great Lakes region.

== Amount of Iron Ore Shipped From the Mines ==
- Errington Open Pit Mine: 9,165,000 Tons
- Hogarth Open Pit Mine: 25,606,184 Tons
- Errington Underground Mine: 3,706,844 Tons
- Roberts Open Pit Mine: 18,000,000 Tons
- Caland Open Pit Mine: 34,634,818 Tons

== Presidents of Steep Rock Iron Mines Limited ==
- Joseph Errington: 1939-1942
- Major-General Donald Hogarth: 1942-1950
- Morson Scarth (Pop) Fotheringham: 1950-1967
- Neil Edmonstone: 1967-1970
- Ray Jones: 1970-1976
- Larry Lamb: 1976-1984

== Canadian Charleson Iron Mine Limited ==
The Canadian Charleson Limited property consisted of 19 claims covering an area of 1,450 acres. The claims were secured in 1952 by Charleson Mining Company from the owners, J.A. Mathieu Ltd., C.E. Pattison, and Rawn Iron Mines Limited. By December 1960, Canadian Charleson Limited became a wholly owned subsidiary of Oglebay Norton Company.

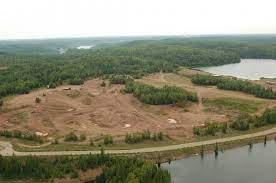
Aerial of Charleson Recreation Area

Gravel deposits as a source of iron ore was recognized after Steep Rock Iron Mines Limited opened up some pits for sand and gravel. The gravel on the property averaged approximately seventy feet thick and contained an estimated reserve of 50 million cubic yards of ore-baring gravel. In 1955, the company built a $2 million concentrator near what is now the Atikokan Municipal Airport. The concentrator contained a washing station and a screening station and was operated seasonally. The mining operation itself looked more like road construction than mining and used a Euclid Scrapers, which then transported it to the hopper to be dumped. After going through the concentrator the final result was a high grade product of 58% iron.

During the seven years of operation the total amount of iron ore shipped from Canadian Charleson Limited was 672,895 tons. The mine shut down in 1965 due to poor economic climate, low demand for lump ore due to the preference for iron ore pellets and high costs.

After the mine closed down, the area became a main source of gravel and fill for the town of Atikokan. The Atikokan Airport was built on the flats in 1975. The area that the pits were located was renamed Charleson Recreation Area and is used for dirt bikes, motocross, Sports Days, mud flings, snow machines, horse back riding, hiking and mountain biking.

== Mesoarchaean Stromatolite Reefs of Steep Rock Lake ==
Cliffs along the northern shoreline of Steep Rock Lake expose 2.8 Ga (Mesoarchean) stromatolite reefs. They consist largely of giant domal stromatolites that are part of the 500 m (1,600 ft) thick Mosher Carbonate. The limestones and dolomites of the Mosher Carbonate comprise one of the oldest known carbonate platforms and passive margins in the world. The level of preservation of the giant domal stromatolites and associated carbonate platform makes these cliffs a very rare, if not unique, locality to study Mesoarchean paleoenvironments and chemostratigraphy.

== See also ==
- Cyrus Eaton
- Atikokan Centennial Museum contains artifacts, archives and an exhibit of the mining history of Steep Rock Lake.
