= Lac des Mille Lacs 22A2 =

- Indian reserve
- Lac des Mille Lacs Indian Reserve No. 22A2
- Location within Ontario
- Coordinates: 49°01′23″N 90°53′32″W
- Country: Canada
- Province: Ontario
- District: Thunder Bay
- First Nation: Lac des Mille Lacs

Area
  - Land: 31.28 km^{2} (12.08 sq mi)

Population (2011)
  - Total: 0
  - Density: 0/km^{2} (0/sq mi)
- Website: lacdesmillelacsfirstnation.ca

Lac des Mille Lacs 22A2 (formerly Seine River 22A2) is a First Nations reserve in northwestern Ontario, Canada. It is one of the reserves of the Lac des Mille Lacs First Nation.
