= Beaver River (Thunder Bay District) =

- Location of the mouth of the Beaver River in Ontario

Location
- Country: Canada
- Province: Ontario
- Region: Central Ontario
- District: Thunder Bay

Physical characteristics
- Source: Unnamed muskeg
  - coordinates: 49°08′46″N 90°41′09″W
  - elevation: 478 m (1,568 ft)
- Mouth: Firesteel River
  - coordinates: 49°03′02″N 90°46′48″W
  - elevation: 450 m (1,480 ft)

Basin features
- River system: Hudson Bay drainage basin

The Beaver River is a river in the west of Thunder Bay District in Northwestern Ontario, Canada. It is part of the Hudson Bay drainage basin, and is a right tributary of the Firesteel River.

== Course ==
The river begins at an unnamed muskeg and travels south, passes under the Canadian Pacific Railway transcontinental main line and Ontario Highway 17, then heads southwest, and reaches its mouth at the Firesteel River about 23 kilometres (14 mi) west of the community of Upsala.

== Sources ==
- Map 13 (PDF) (Map). 1 : 1,600,000. Official road map of Ontario. Ministry of Transportation of Ontario. 2012-01-01.
- Restructured municipalities - Ontario map #1 (Map). Restructuring Maps of Ontario. Ontario Ministry of Municipal Affairs and Housing. 2006. Archived from the original on 2012-05-05.
