= Seine River (Ontario) =

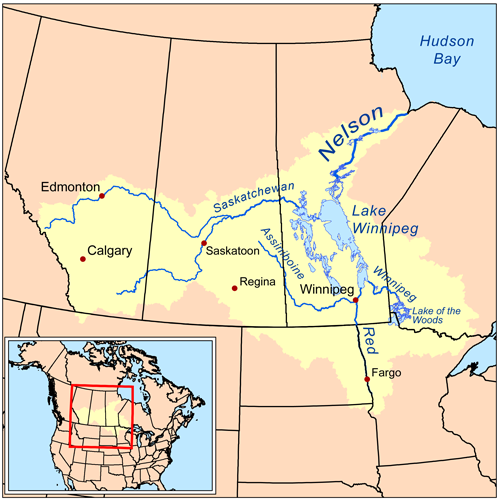

- Location of the mouth of the Seine River in Ontario
- Etymology: Named after the Seine River in France

Location
- Country: Canada
- Province: Ontario
- Region: Northwestern Ontario
- Districts: Kenora; Rainy River; Thunder Bay

Physical characteristics
- Source: Lac des Mille Lacs
  - location: Thunder Bay District
  - coordinates: 48°58′46″N 90°43′49″W
  - elevation: 457 m (1,499 ft)
- Mouth: Rainy Lake
  - location: Rainy River District
  - coordinates: 48°39′56″N 92°49′19″W
  - elevation: 338 m (1,109 ft)
- Length: 240 km (150 mi)

Basin features
- River system: Hudson Bay drainage basin
- Tributaries
  - left: Atikokan River, Mercutio River
  - right: Eye River, Firesteel River

The Seine River is a river in Kenora, Rainy River and Thunder Bay Districts in northwestern Ontario, Canada. It flows 240 kilometres (149 mi) from Lac des Mille Lacs to Rainy Lake.

The river was an important route in the days of the fur trade. Gold was discovered along the river near the end of the 19th century and several mining operations established in the area. In 1943, a section of the river was diverted near Steep Rock Lake to gain access to a large iron ore deposit under the lake. That mine has since been closed. The river is used for recreational canoeing and kayaking.

== Course ==
=== Upper reaches ===
The river flows west out of the northwest arm of Lac des Mille Lacs in Thunder Bay District over the Lac des Mille Lacs Dam, owned by the Ontario Ministry of Natural Resources (OMNR) and operated by the Valerie Falls Limited Partnership (Brookfield Renewable Power) (See Lac des Mille Lacs Dam). It flows through Mosher lake, takes in the left tributary Firesteel River and briefly flows through the southeast corner of Kenora District. The river turns southwest into Rainy River District, heads over the Long Rapids and Camp Six Rapids, takes in the left tributary Mercutio River, tumbles over the Islands Falls, reaches Bradshaw Lake and flows into the Marmion Lake and reservoir, where it takes in four right tributaries.

According to Barnes, the Upper Seine River was a "prime gold area." Key mines included the Harold Lake Mine (1894-1896), the Hammond Reef Mine (1894-1922), and the Sawbill Mine (1897-1899).

=== Lower reaches ===
Below Steeprock Lake, the river takes in the major left tributary Atikokan River and the minor left tributary Caribus Creek, then takes in the outflow from the Seine River Diversion on the right. It flows west over the Boyce Rapids, takes in the right tributary Eye River, passes through the Chubb Narrows and Banning Narrows, and reaches Calm Lake. The lake is controlled at the west end by the Calm Lake Dam and generating station (10 MW), built in 1926 and operated today by Abitibi-Consolidated Hydro. The river heads out of the lake southwest over the Manitou Rapids into Fin Bay on Laseine Lake. This lake is controlled at the west end by the Sturgeon Falls Dam and generating station (8 MW), also built in 1926 and also operated today by Abitibi-Consolidated Hydro.

The river heads west, is crossed by Ontario Highway 11, passes the community of Seine River Village (post office established in 1895 on the right bank, and reaches its mouth at Seine Bay on Rainy Lake.

Gold was discovered in the area by J.S. Campbell in 1893, which resulted in the Golden Crescent Mine. Other notable mines included the Foley Mine (1897-1898), the Gold Star Mine, and the Olive Mine (1897-1909). However, most of the mines in the area closed down with the collapse of the gold rush from 1903 to 1904.

== Tributaries ==
- Albertson Creek (right)
- McLeod Creek (right)
- Suckers Creek (left)
- Swamp Creek (left)
- Laseine Lake
  - Price Creek (left)
  - Mills Creek (left)
- Calm Lake
  - Little Joe Creek (right)
  - Niven Creek (right)
- McCaulay Creek (left)
- Arnold Creek (right)
- Jackfish Creek (left)
- Eye River (right)
- Caribus Creek (left)
- Atikokan River (left)
- Hardtack Creek (right)
- Marmion Lake
  - Sawbill Creek (right)
  - Lumby Creek (right)
  - Light Creek (right)
  - Caribou River (right)
- Mercutio River (left)
- Firesteel River (right)

== See also ==
- List of rivers of Ontario

== Sources ==
- "Seine River". Geographical Names Data Base. Natural Resources Canada.
- "Topographic Map sheets 52B12, 52B13, 52B14, 52B15, 52C9, 52C10, 52C16, 52G2, 52G3". Atlas of Canada. Natural Resources Canada. 2010-02-04.
