= Lac des Mille Lacs =

- Location of Lac des Mille Lacs in Ontario.
- Location: Thunder Bay, Ontario, Canada
- Coordinates: 48°50′57″N 90°30′38″W
- Type: Lake
- Primary inflows: Savanne River
- Catchment area: 1,774.55 km^{2} (685.16 sq mi)
- Max. length: 30 km (19 mi)
- Max. width: 20 km (12 mi)
- Surface area: 245.1 km^{2} (94.6 sq mi)
- Surface elevation: 457 m (1,499 ft)

Lac des Mille Lacs is a lake in the western part of Thunder Bay District in northwestern Ontario, Canada. It is in the Nelson River drainage basin and is the source of the Seine River. The lake lies between Ontario Highway 17 on the north and Ontario Highway 11 on the south about 100 kilometres (62 mi) west of the city of Thunder Bay.

Lac des Mille Lacs has an area of 245.1 square kilometres (94.6 sq mi) and a drainage basin of 1,774.55 square kilometres (685.16 sq mi). The named inflows are the Savanne River and McKay Creek at Sawmill Bay at the northeast, Joe's Creek at Baril Bay at the southwest, and Inwood Creek at the north. The only outflow, at the northwest tip of the lake, is the Seine River, which flows to Rainy Lake and eventually via the Nelson River to Hudson Bay. The lake has numerous arms, named bays and named islands.

== Roads ==
The lake is served by Lac des Mille Lacs Road, which connects the lake to Highway 17 near Upsala.

== Lac des Mille Lacs Dam ==
The outflow to the Seine River is controlled by the Lac des Mille Lacs Dam, owned by the Ontario Ministry of Natural Resources (OMNR) and operated by the Valerie Falls Limited Partnership (Brookfield Renewable Power). The first dam at the site was built of stone by Simon James Dawson of the Department of Public Works Canada in 1873 to improve water flow for navigation to the vicinity of the Red River of the North far downstream. This dam was replaced in 1926 by a timber dam to regulate water flow used for hydroelectric power production downstream on the Seine River and Rainy River. The current concrete structure was built in 1952 with seven sluices, each with eight logs. With all logs, the maximum sill height is 457 metres (1,499 ft), and without any the minimum height is 454.6 metres (1,491 ft 6 in).

The dam project is one of several in the region which has been cited by the Lac des Mille Lacs First Nation as having displaced them from their traditional territories, including the Lac des Mille Lacs 22A1 reserve on the shore of the lake, due to flooding. The First Nation, which is currently dispersed throughout Northwestern Ontario rather than living on its traditional lands, has a land claim pending negotiation with the federal and provincial governments.

== Tributaries ==
clockwise from the Seine River outflow

- Inwood Creek
- McKay Creek
- Savanne River
- Joe's Creek
