= Marmion Lake =

Lake in Ontario, Canada

- Location within Ontario
- Location: Ontario
- Coordinates: 48.873°N 91.530°W
- Basin countries: Canada

Marmion Lake is a lake in Rainy River District, Ontario, Canada.

== See also ==
- List of lakes in Ontario
