= Firesteel River (Ontario) =

- Location of the mouth of the Firesteel River in Ontario

Location
- Country: Canada
- Province: Ontario
- District: Thunder Bay

Physical characteristics
- Source: Trap Lake
  - coordinates: 49°12′42″N 90°26′58″W
  - elevation: 495 m (1,624 ft)
- Mouth: Seine River
  - coordinates: 49°01′47″N 90°56′45″W
  - elevation: 437 m (1,434 ft)
- Length: 55 km (34 mi)

Basin features
- River system: Hudson Bay drainage basin
- Tributaries
  - left: Hay River (Canada), East Firesteel River
  - right: Trewartha Creek, Beaver River, North Firesteel River

The Firesteel River is a river in Thunder Bay District, northwestern Ontario, Canada in the Hudson Bay drainage basin. It flows from Trap Lake, 3 kilometres (1.9 mi) east of the Canadian National Railway location of George and 19 kilometres (12 mi) north of the community of Upsala, southwest under the Canadian National Railway, the Canadian Pacific Railway mainline and Ontario Highway 17 to its mouth at the Seine River, 28 kilometres (17 mi) west of Upsala.

== Tributaries ==
- Trewartha Creek (right)
- Beaver River (right)
- Hay River (left)
- East Firesteel River (left)
- North Firesteel River (right)

== See also ==
- List of rivers of Ontario

== Sources ==
- "Firesteel River". Geographical Names Data Base. Natural Resources Canada.
- "Topographic Map sheets 52G1, 52G2". Atlas of Canada. Natural Resources Canada. 2010-02-04. Archived from the original on 2010-08-03.
