= List of secondary highways in Kenora District =

List of Ontario secondary highways

This is a list of secondary highways in Kenora District, most of which provide access to isolated and sparsely populated areas in the Kenora District of northwestern Ontario.

== Highway 525 ==
Highway 525

Route information
- Maintained by Ministry of Transportation of Ontario
- Length: 35.4 km (22.0 mi)
- Existed: 1956–1972 (in Gravenhurst); 1982–present

Major junctions
- South end: Highway 596 near Minaki
- North end: Islington Indian Reserve entrance

Location
- Country: Canada
- Province: Ontario
- Counties: Kenora District
- Major cities: Whitedog

Highway system
- Ontario provincial highways; Current; Former; 400-series
← Highway 524	→ Highway 526

Secondary Highway 525, commonly referred to as Highway 525, is a provincially maintained secondary highway in the Canadian province of Ontario. It is a remote secondary highway that links Highway 596 to the Wabaseemoong First Nations reserve. It is the second-westernmost secondary highway in the province, Highway 673 being the first. The route was commissioned by 1982 along what was formerly Highway 596; a former use of the route number existed between 1956 and 1973 in Gravenhurst.

== Highway 594 ==
Highway 594

Route information
- Maintained by Ministry of Transportation of Ontario
- Length: 37.4 km (23.2 mi)
- Existed: 1956–present

Major junctions
- West end: Highway 17 near Eagle River
- East end: Highway 17 in Dryden

Location
- Country: Canada
- Province: Ontario
- Districts: Kenora District
- Towns: Dryden, Eagle River

Highway system
- Ontario provincial highways; Current; Former; 400-series
← Highway 593	→ Highway 595

Secondary Highway 594, commonly referred to as Highway 594, is a provincially maintained secondary highway in the Canadian province of Ontario. Located in Kenora District, the route branches off Highway 17, the Trans-Canada Highway, between Eagle River and downtown Dryden, a distance of 37.4 km (23.2 mi). The portion through Dryden, east of Gordon Road, is maintained under a Connecting Link agreement. Highway 594 also serves to connect the northern end of Highway 502 with Highway 17.

== Highway 596 ==
Highway 596

Route information
- Maintained by the Ministry of Transportation of Ontario
- Existed: 1956–present

Major junctions
- South end: Highway 17A (Kenora Bypass) in Kenora
- Highway 641; Highway 525 – Whitedog
- North end: Minaki

Location
- Country: Canada
- Province: Ontario

Highway system
- Ontario provincial highways; Current; Former; 400-series
← Highway 595	→ Highway 597

Secondary Highway 596, commonly referred to as Highway 596, is a provincially maintained secondary highway in the Canadian province of Ontario. It connects the city of Kenora and the Trans-Canada Highway to Minaki, with a length of 48 kilometres. The highway was assigned in 1956. The southern part of the highway used a former road from Kenora to Trout Lake. The part from Pistol Lake to Minaki was originally part of a supply route for the construction of the White Dog Falls Station hydroelectric dam near the White Dog Reserve. New road was built linking these two older segments. The highway was substantially rebuilt and upgraded around 1980 as part of the Ontario Government's renovation of Minaki Lodge (since closed).

=== Termini and Intersections ===
- Northern terminus: The hamlet of Minaki, Ontario, shortly before a crossing with the Canadian National Railway's transcontinental line. West of Minaki, the highway crosses this railway line twice.
- Southern terminus: Highway 17 in Kenora, Ontario.
- Intersections
  - Kenora, ON
    - King's Highway 17, Trans-Canada Highway, Southern Terminus in Kenora
    - King's Highway 17A, Kenora Bypass
  - Kenora District
    - Provincial Secondary Highway 641
    - Trail, to Wade, Ontario
    - Provincial Secondary Highway 525, to White Dog Reserve
    - Undefined Rd 24, Northern terminus at Minaki, Ontario

== Highway 601 ==
Highway 601

Route information
- Maintained by Ministry of Transportation of Ontario
- Length: 25.0 km (15.5 mi)
- Existed: May 9, 1956–present

Major junctions
- West end: Dryden north limits
- East end: Highway 17 / TCH

Location
- Country: Canada
- Province: Ontario
- Districts: Kenora District

Highway system
- Ontario provincial highways; Current; Former; 400-series
← Highway 600	→ Highway 602

Secondary Highway 601, commonly referred to as Highway 601, is a secondary highway in the Canadian province of Ontario, in Kenora District. The route loops north of Dryden, providing access to Dryden Regional Airport. The western terminus is at the Dryden city limits at the intersection of Leach Road, Theil Road and Colonization Avenue, from which it proceeds north along the latter. It loops around Beaver Lake and Zealand Lake, turns south, and passes the airport. The western terminus is at Highway 17 (the Trans-Canada Highway) east of Dryden. The route is 25.0 kilometres (15.5 mi) in length. Highway 601 was assumed on May 9, 1956.

== Highway 603 ==
Highway 603

Route information
- Maintained by Ministry of Transportation of Ontario
- Length: 4.5 km (2.8 mi)
- Existed: May 9, 1956–present

Major junctions
- South end: Highway 17 / TCH at Borups Corners
- North end: CPR flag stop at Dyment

Location
- Country: Canada
- Province: Ontario
- Districts: Kenora District
- Towns: Borups Corners, Dyment

Highway system
- Ontario provincial highways; Current; Former; 400-series
← Highway 602	→ Highway 605

Secondary Highway 603, commonly referred to as Highway 603, is a short secondary highway in the Canadian province of Ontario, in Kenora District. Located entirely within geographic Melgund Township in Kenora District, the highway extends for 4.5 kilometres (2.8 mi) from a junction with Highway 17 at Borups Corners northerly to the community of Dyment, ending at a flag stop on the Canadian Pacific Railway transcontinental mainline.

== Highway 604 ==
Highway 604

Route information
- Maintained by Ministry of Transportation of Ontario
- Length: 12.6 km (7.8 mi)

Major junctions
- From: Highway 17 / TCH
- To: Highway 671

Location
- Country: Canada
- Province: Ontario
- Districts: Kenora District
- Major cities: Kenora

Highway system
- Ontario provincial highways; Current; Former; 400-series

Secondary Highway 604, commonly referred to as Highway 604, was a secondary highway in the Canadian province of Ontario, in Kenora District. Its total length was approximately 12.6 kilometres (7.8 mi). Its western terminus was Highway 17 in Kenora, and its eastern terminus was Highway 671, 1.9 kilometres (1.2 mi) past Kenora Airport. The highway was transferred to the town of Jaffray Melick on April 1, 1997, and the Connecting Link through Kenora removed.

== Highway 605 ==
Highway 605

Route information
- Maintained by Ministry of Transportation of Ontario
- Length: 12.4 km (7.7 mi)
- Existed: May 9, 1956–present

Major junctions
- South end: Highway 17 / TCH at Oxdrift
- North end: Road fork near Eton-Rugby

Location
- Country: Canada
- Province: Ontario
- Districts: Kenora District

Highway system
- Ontario provincial highways; Current; Former; 400-series
← Highway 603	→ Highway 607

Secondary Highway 605, commonly referred to as Highway 605, is a secondary highway in the Canadian province of Ontario, in Kenora District. The route begins at Highway 17 (the Trans-Canada Highway) at the hamlet of Oxdrift, west of Dryden. It travels north 12.4 kilometres (7.7 mi) and ends at a fork in the road near Rugby Lake. Highway 605 was assumed on May 9, 1956, and provides service to the dispersed rural community of Eton-Rugby.

== Highway 609 ==
Highway 609

Route information
- Maintained by Ministry of Transportation of Ontario
- Length: 15.5 km (9.6 mi)

Major junctions
- East end: Highway 105 at Red Lake Road
- North end: Dead end at Clay Lake

Location
- Country: Canada
- Province: Ontario
- Towns: Red Lake Road, Quibell

Highway system
- Ontario provincial highways; Current; Former; 400-series

Secondary Highway 609, commonly referred to as Highway 609, is a 15.5-kilometre (9.6 mi) secondary highway in Kenora District in Northwestern Ontario, Canada. The highway runs west from a junction with Ontario Highway 105 at the community of Red Lake Road to the community of Quibell, passing over the Wabigoon River at Quibell Dam, then heads north over the Canadian National Railway transcontinental main line onward to its terminus at Clay Lake. The road is paved from Highway 105 to Quibell, then gravel to its terminus at Clay Lake, and had an AADT traffic count in 2007 of 100 for its entire length.

== Highway 618 ==
Highway 618

Route information
- Maintained by Ministry of Transportation of Ontario
- Length: 11.7 km (7.3 mi)
- Existed: 1956–present

Major junctions
- West end: Olsen Mine Road in Starratt-Olsen
- East end: Highway 105 – Ear Falls, Vermilion Bay

Location
- Country: Canada
- Province: Ontario
- Counties: Kenora District
- Towns: Red Lake

Highway system
- Ontario provincial highways; Current; Former; 400-series
← Highway 617	→ Highway 619

Secondary Highway 618, commonly referred to as Highway 618, is a provincially maintained secondary highway in the Canadian province of Ontario. It connects Olsen Mine and Madsen with the northern terminus of Highway 105 in the town of Red Lake. The 11.7-kilometre (7.3 mi) route was established in 1956, and has remained the same since then. It passes through a remote forested area, and encounters no communities of any significance outside of Red Lake.

== Highway 641 ==
Highway 641

Route information
- Maintained by Ministry of Transportation of Ontario
- Length: 13.4 km (8.3 mi)
- Existed: 1963–present

Major junctions
- South end: Highway 17 near Keewatin
- North end: Highway 596 near Laclu

Location
- Country: Canada
- Province: Ontario
- Districts: Kenora District
- Towns: Laclu

Highway system
- Ontario provincial highways; Current; Former; 400-series

Secondary Highway 641, commonly referred to as Highway 641, is a secondary highway in Kenora District, Ontario, Canada. Its total length is approximately 13.4 kilometres (8.3 mi). Its northern terminus at Ontario Highway 596, and its southern terminus is at Highway 17 in Kenora, just east of the junction of Highway 17 with the western end of the Kenora Bypass (Ontario Highway 17A). The highway passes under the Kenora Bypass and the Canadian Pacific Railway transcontinental main line, and travels through the settlement of Laclu. The highway had an AADT traffic count of 460 in 2016.

== Highway 642 ==
Highway 642

Route information
- Maintained by Ministry of Transportation of Ontario
- Length: 73.0 km (45.4 mi)

Major junctions
- West end: Highway 72 / Highway 516 (Ed Ariano Bypass) in Sioux Lookout
- East end: Highway 599 in Silver Dollar

Location
- Country: Canada
- Province: Ontario
- Counties: Kenora District
- Towns: Sioux Lookout, Umfreville, Silver Dollar

Highway system
- Ontario provincial highways; Current; Former; 400-series

Secondary Highway 642, commonly referred to as Highway 642, is a secondary highway in the Canadian province of Ontario. Its total length is approximately 73.0 kilometres (45.4 mi). The western terminus is at the Ed Ariano Bypass on the eastern edge of Sioux Lookout; Highway 72 and Highway 516 share a common terminus at this intersection. The eastern terminus is at Highway 599 in Silver Dollar. The highway crosses the Marchington River and the Canadian National Railway transcontinental main line at the unincorporated place of Superior Junction.

== Highway 646 ==
Highway 646

Route information
- Maintained by Ministry of Transportation of Ontario

Major junctions
- West end: Pickle Crow
- East end: Pickle Lake Airport

Location
- Country: Canada
- Province: Ontario
- Districts: Kenora District
- Major cities: Pickle Lake

Highway system
- Ontario provincial highways; Current; Former; 400-series
← Highway 645	→ Highway 647

Secondary Highway 646, commonly referred to as Highway 646, was a secondary highway in the Canadian province of Ontario. It was the second-most northerly provincial highway in the entire network, surpassed only by Highway 599. It is no longer a secondary highway, and appears as Pickle Lake Road on road signs. The road travels through Pickle Lake, where it intersects Highway 599, and links Pickle Lake with the community of Pickle Crow to the east and the Pickle Lake Airport to the west.

== Highway 647 ==
Highway 647

Route information
- Maintained by the Ministry of Transportation of Ontario
- Length: 8.2 km (5.1 mi)
- Existed: December 30, 1963–present

Major junctions
- Southeast end: Highway 17 / TCH in Vermilion Bay
- Northwest end: McIntosh Road at Blue Lake Provincial Park

Location
- Country: Canada
- Province: Ontario
- Districts: Kenora District

Highway system
- Ontario provincial highways; Current; Former; 400-series
← Highway 645	→ Highway 650
Former provincial highways
← Highway 646	Highway 648 →

Secondary Highway 647, commonly referred to as Highway 647, is a secondary highway in the Canadian province of Ontario. Its southeastern terminus is at Highway 17 at the west edge of the community of Vermilion Bay, and its northwestern terminus is at McIntosh Road at Blue Lake Provincial Park, a distance of 8.2 kilometres (5.1 mi) Beyond this point, the road continues as an unposted local road to the community of McIntosh and further to the Forest Lake Dam, providing access to cottages and resorts on the Indian Lake Chain.

Highway 647 was assumed by the Department of Highways, predecessor to the modern Ministry of Transportation, on December 30, 1963.

== Highway 657 ==
Highway 657

Route information
- Maintained by the Ministry of Transportation of Ontario
- Length: 6.0 km (3.7 mi)
- Existed: November 17, 1966–present

Major junctions
- West end: Highway 105 in Ear Falls
- East end: Goldpines

Location
- Country: Canada
- Province: Ontario
- Districts: Kenora District

Highway system
- Ontario provincial highways; Current; Former; 400-series
← Highway 656	→ Highway 658

Secondary Highway 657, commonly referred to as Highway 657, is a provincially maintained highway in the Canadian province of Ontario, in Kenora District. The highway extends 6.0 kilometres (3.7 mi) from Highway 105 in the town of Ear Falls to the former Hudson's Bay Company fur trading outpost at Goldpines, now home to several fishing and camping lodges.

The existing road to Goldpines was assumed as a provincial route by the Department of Highways, predecessor to the modern Ministry of Transportation, on November 17, 1966.

== Highway 658 ==
Highway 658

Route information
- Maintained by the Ministry of Transportation of Ontario
- Length: 25.3 km (15.7 mi)
- History: Highway 128 (1956–1975); Highway 666 (1975–1985)

Major junctions
- South end: Highway 17A (Kenora Bypass) in Kenora
- North end: CNR station in Redditt

Location
- Country: Canada
- Province: Ontario
- Counties: Kenora District

Highway system
- Ontario provincial highways; Current; Former; 400-series
← Highway 657	→ Highway 661
Former provincial highways
Highway 659 →

Secondary Highway 658, commonly referred to as Highway 658, is a provincially maintained secondary highway in the Canadian province of Ontario, in Kenora District. The highway extends 25.3 kilometres (15.7 mi) between the city of Kenora and the community of Redditt. For a decade, Highway 658 was numbered as Highway 666, leading to numerous sign thefts and a petition by members of a church on the route. This petition eventually led to the route being renumbered in late 1985.

== Highway 664 ==
Highway 664

Route information
- Maintained by the Ministry of Transportation of Ontario
- Length: 16.9 km (10.5 mi)
- History: Established 1934 (as part of Highway 72); Redesignated 1954 (as Highway 116); 1975 (as Highway 664)

Major junctions
- West end: CNR crossing in Hudson
- East end: Highway 72 near Sioux Lookout

Location
- Country: Canada
- Province: Ontario
- Districts: Kenora

Highway system
- Ontario provincial highways; Current; Former; 400-series
← Highway 663	→ Highway 665

Secondary Highway 664, commonly referred to as Highway 664, is a secondary highway in the Canadian province of Ontario. Located in Kenora District, the highway links the community of Hudson to Highway 72 near Sioux Lookout. In late July 2012, it was announced that the road would be renamed The Leo Bernier Memorial Highway, after the former MPP for Kenora and Minister of Northern Affairs.

=== History ===
The highway began as a part of Highway 72 in 1934. In 1954, the road was renumbered as Highway 116, but may have been briefly designated as "Highway 72A" before that. By 1975, the Ministry of Transportation of Ontario had decided to demote three very lightly travelled Kings Highways in Northwestern Ontario to secondary highway status. Those roadways were Highway 116 (which became Highway 664), Highway 119 (which became Highway 665), and Highway 128 (which became the infamous Highway 666, and was consequently renumbered as Highway 658 in 1985.)

The road today is a typical secondary highway: lightly travelled, connecting a town to a main Kings Highway (Highway 72), and has slightly narrower and coarser pavement than Kings Highways.

=== Communities ===
- Hudson
- Sam Lake

== Highway 665 ==
Highway 665

Route information
- Maintained by Ministry of Transportation of Ontario
- Length: 21.1 km (13.1 mi)
- Existed: 1956 (as Highway 119); 1975 (as Highway 665)–present

Major junctions
- South end: Highway 17 near Dryden
- North end: Richan

Location
- Country: Canada
- Province: Ontario
- Counties: Kenora District

Highway system
- Ontario provincial highways; Current; Former; 400-series
← Highway 664	→ Highway 667
Former provincial highways
Highway 666 →

Secondary Highway 665, commonly referred to as Highway 665, is a secondary highway in the Canadian province of Ontario. Located in Kenora District, the highway links the community of Richan to Highway 17 near Dryden.

The road was formerly a King's highway, with the designation of Highway 119, but was demoted to secondary highway status in 1975 along with two other routes in the Kenora District.

== Highway 671 ==
Highway 671
- Jones Road

Route information
- Maintained by Ministry of Transportation of Ontario
- Length: 68.7 km (42.7 mi)
- Existed: 1988–present

Major junctions
- North end: Grassy Narrows
- South end: Kenora, Ontario

Location
- Country: Canada
- Province: Ontario
- Counties: Kenora District

Highway system
- Ontario provincial highways; Current; Former; 400-series

Secondary Highway 671 is a highway 68.7 km (42.7 miles) in length. It stretches from the intersection with Jones Road to one of the East Indian Reserves near Grassy Narrows south to Kenora, Ontario terminating at Ontario Highway 17A (Kenora Bypass).

== Highway 673 ==
Highway 673

Route information
- Maintained by Ministry of Transportation of Ontario
- Length: 8.1 km (5.0 mi)
- Existed: 1993–present

Major junctions
- North end: Highway 17 west of Kenora
- South end: Shoal Lake

Location
- Country: Canada
- Province: Ontario
- Counties: Kenora District

Highway system
- Ontario provincial highways; Current; Former; 400-series

Secondary Highway 673, commonly referred to as Highway 673, is one of the newest secondary highways in Ontario, and one of the newest of any provincially designated highway, having been constructed in 1993. The road is also Ontario's most westerly highway aside from Highway 17, which continues into nearby Manitoba. it is also one of the shortest secondary highways in the system.

The road starts at Highway 17, and provides access to the three Indian reserves on Shoal Lake (Shoal Lake #39, Shoal Lake #40, and Kejick First Nation).
