= Ontario Highway 72 =

Ontario provincial highway

Highway 72

Route information
- Maintained by the Ministry of Transportation of Ontario
- Length: 68.5 km (42.6 mi)
- Existed: October 6, 1937–present

Major junctions
- South end: Highway 17 in Dinorwic
- Highway 664 – Hudson
- North end: Highway 642 in Sioux Lookout

Location
- Country: Canada
- Province: Ontario

Highway system
- Ontario provincial highways; Current; Former; 400-series
← Highway 71	→ Highway 77
Former provincial highways
Highway 73 →

King's Highway 72, commonly referred to as Highway 72, is a provincially maintained highway in the northern half of the Canadian province of Ontario. The highway connects Highway 17 in Dinorwic with the town of Sioux Lookout, where there are connections with Highway 516 towards Savant Lake and Highway 642 towards Silver Dollar.

Highway 72 was built as a trunk route by 1920, and became a provincial highway in 1937. It has remained largely unchanged since then, aside from the reconstruction and realignment of the Frog Rapids bridge, and the renumbering of the fork towards Hudson as Highway 664. The length of the highway is 68.5 km (42.6 mi), the entirety of which is situated in Kenora District. There are no significant settlements between its endpoints.

== Route description ==
Highway 72 is a 68.5 km (42.6 mi) route which serves to connect Sioux Lookout with the Trans-Canada Highway. The route begins at Highway 17, on the western edge of Dinorwic. From there it follows an old routing of Highway 17 along the northern edge of the village, but eventually turns to the north into the wilderness. Between this point and south of the Frog Rapids Narrows, where Highway 664 intersects the route, the highways passes through a remote forested region dotted with lakes and muskeg; there is almost no human habitation. After crossing the Frog Rapids Narrows, the highway enters Sioux Lookout. It zig-zags through the town, crossing the old Grand Trunk Railroad, now a Canadian National Railway line, next to a large rail depot. It exits Sioux Lookout, ending at an intersection with the Ed Ariano Bypass, Highway 516 and Highway 642 just east of the town.

== History ==
The Frog Rapids Narrows Bridge shortly after completion in 1938

Sioux Lookout and Hudson were both originally accessible only by rail and water when they were established as stops on the Grand Trunk Railway shortly after 1900; roads would not reach the remote area until 1920. The road connecting Sioux Lookout and Hudson with the Ignace–Dryden Road was initially under the upkeep of the Department of Northern Development. On April 1, 1937, that department was merged into the Department of Highways (DHO), after which the provincial highway network was expanded into northern Ontario.

Shortly after the merger, the DHO began to assume highways throughout northern Ontario. On October 6, 1937, Highway 72 was established, connecting Highway 17 with both Sioux Lookout and Hudson. On the 1938–39 Official Ontario Road Map, the distance from Dinorwic to Sioux Lookout is listed as 48.0 miles (77.2 km), and from Dinorwic to Hudson as 53.0 miles (85.3 km). This routing remained in place until at least 1953. By 1954, however, the branch leading to Hudson was renumbered as Highway 116. Highway 72 has, aside from minor realignments, remained unchanged since then.

== Major intersections ==
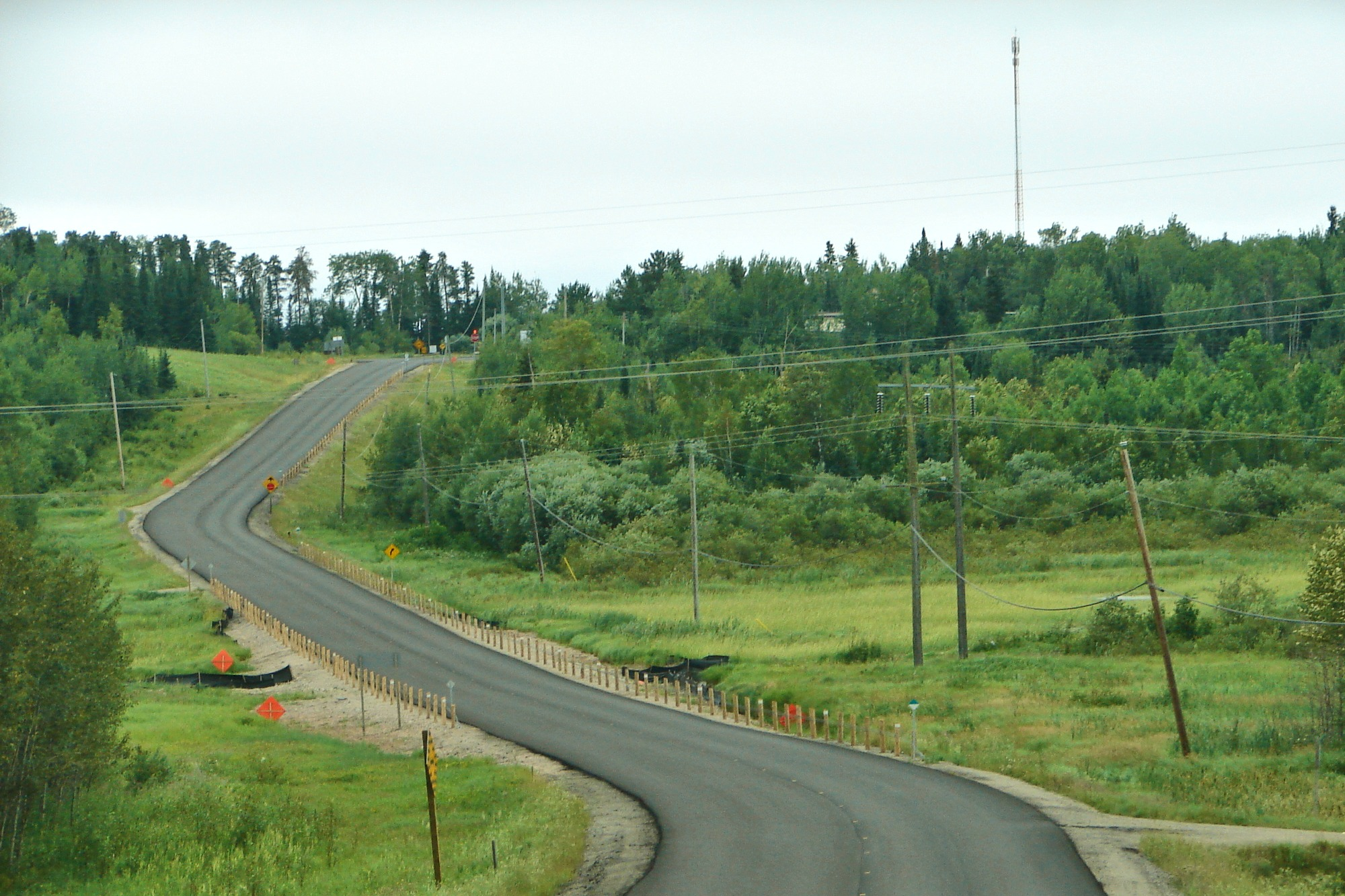
Hwy 72 near Dinorwic

The following table lists the major junctions along Highway 72, as noted by the Ministry of Transportation of Ontario. The entire route is located in Kenora District.

Location	km	mi	Destinations	Notes
Dinorwic	0.0	0.0	Highway 17 / TCH – Kenora, Thunder Bay	Highway 72 southern terminus
Sioux Lookout	60.5	37.6	Highway 664 west – Hudson, Lac Seul First Nation	
Sioux Lookout	63.1	39.2	Crosses Frog Rapids Narrows	
Sioux Lookout	67.2	41.8	Ed Ariano Bypass / 1st Avenue	Highway 72 follows Ed Ariano Bypass
Sioux Lookout	68.5	42.6	Highway 642 east – Silver Dollar; Alcona Drive Highway 516 north – Pickle Lake	Highway 72 northern terminus
1.000 mi = 1.609 km; 1.000 km = 0.621 mi
