= Ontario Highway 17A =

Ontario provincial highway

Highway 17A
- Kenora By-Pass

Route information
- Auxiliary route of Highway 17
- Maintained by the Ministry of Transportation of Ontario
- Length: 33.3 km (20.7 mi)
- Existed: November 16, 1990–present

Major junctions
- Beltway around Kenora
- West end: Highway 17 west near Keewatin
- Highway 596 near Keewatin; Highway 658 near Jaffray–Melick; Highway 671
- East end: Highway 17 east near Kenora

Location
- Country: Canada
- Province: Ontario
- Counties: Kenora District
- Major cities: Kenora, Kenora Airport

Highway system
- Ontario provincial highways; Current; Former; 400-series
| ← Highway 17 | → Highway 17B |

King's Highway 17A, commonly referred to as Highway 17A or as the Kenora By-Pass, is an alternate route of Highway 17 around the city of Kenora, in the Canadian province of Ontario. It was built along a former Canadian Pacific Railway right-of-way, and has two westbound passing lanes in separate parts, and one eastbound passing lane.

== Route description ==
Although it is not an official part of the Trans-Canada Highway, Highway 17A is designated as the through route when travelling into Kenora on the Trans-Canada. The road also provides access to Kenora Airport, but otherwise avoids the built-up areas of the city. The highway passes through a heavily forested area dominated by large granite rock outcroppings, geography typical of the Canadian Shield. On an average day approximately 3,200–5,200 vehicles travel along the road, varying by season.

== History ==
Construction of Highway 17A began in 1981 in response to traffic congestion within the city of Kenora, which created a severe bottleneck for cross-national traffic. The bypass opened in stages as it was constructed from west to east. The first 8.4 kilometres (5.2 mi), from Highway 17 to Highway 596 opened in September 1983. Following this, contracts were tendered for construction of the Winnipeg River bridge. The section between Highway 596 and Highway 658 opened several years later in the autumn of 1988. The final section, linking Highway 658 with Highway 17, was opened on November 16, 1990, at which point the Kenora Bypass was designated Highway 17A.

== Major intersections ==
The following table lists the major junctions along Highway 17A, as noted by the Ministry of Transportation of Ontario. The entire route is located in Kenora District.

| Location | km | mi | Destinations | Notes |
|---|---|---|---|---|
| Unorganized Kenora | 0.0 | 0.0 | Highway 17 / TCH – Kenora, Winnipeg | Through traffic follows Highway 17 west |
| Unorganized Kenora | 7.0 | 4.3 | Highway 596 north – Minaki; Darlington Drive | |
| Kenora | 12.5 | 7.8 | Winnipeg River Bridge | |
| Kenora | 14.8 | 9.2 | Highway 658 north (Redditt Road) – Redditt | |
| Kenora | 21.0 | 13.0 | East Melick Road | Formerly Highway 659 north |
| Kenora | 25.3 | 15.7 | Highway 671 north (Jones Road) – Jones | |
| Unorganized Kenora | 33.3 | 20.7 | Highway 17 / TCH – Kenora, Thunder Bay | Through traffic follows Highway 17 east |
1.000 mi = 1.609 km; 1.000 km = 0.621 mi
