= Fowler, Ontario =

Fowler
- Location of Fowler in Ontario
- Coordinates: 50°14′16″N 90°58′16″W
- Country: Canada
- Province: Ontario
- Region: Northwestern Ontario
- District: Kenora
- Part: Kenora, Unorganized
- Elevation: 417 m (1,368 ft)
- Time zone: UTC-6 (Central Time Zone)
  - Summer (DST): UTC-5 (Central Time Zone)
- Postal code FSA: P0T
- Area code: 807

Fowler is a railway point and unincorporated place in Unorganized Kenora District in northwestern Ontario, Canada, just west of the border with Thunder Bay District.

It lies on the Canadian National Railway transcontinental main line, between Ycliff to the west and Savant Lake (on Ontario Highway 599) to the east, has a passing track, and is passed but not served by Via Rail transcontinental Canadian trains.
