= Ontario Highway 516 =

Ontario provincial highway

Highway 516

Route information
- Maintained by the Ministry of Transportation of Ontario
- Length: 103.6 km (64.4 mi)
- History: May 9, 1956–1972 (Muskoka District); 1983–present (Sioux Lookout)

Major junctions
- West end: Highway 72 / Highway 642 in Sioux Lookout
- East end: Highway 599 – Savant Lake

Location
- Country: Canada
- Province: Ontario

Highway system
- Ontario provincial highways; Current; Former; 400-series
← Highway 513	→ Highway 518

Secondary Highway 516, commonly referred to as Highway 516, is a provincially maintained secondary highway in the Canadian province of Ontario. The highway is 103.6-kilometre (64.4 mi) in length, connecting Highway 72 and Highway 642 near Sioux Lookout with Highway 599 north of Savant Lake.

Highway 516 was first assumed by the Department of Highway (DHO), predecessor to the modern Ministry of Transportation of Ontario, in 1956. However, the original route was in Muskoka, between the village of Windermere and Highway 11 east of Utterson. This route was mostly transferred to the newly formed District Municipality of Muskoka in 1972, although a portion near Utterson now forms part of Highway 141. The present-day route of Highway 516 was established circa 1983 and has remained unchanged since.

== Route description ==
Highway 516 is a remote highway with no communities along its 103.6 km (64.4 mi) route. It serves as a link between Sioux Lookout and Highway 599. The route begins east of Sioux Lookout at an intersection with Highway 72 and Highway 642 at the north end of the Ed Ariano Bypass. North of the intersection, the highway passes east of Sioux Lookout Airport. It then enters a vast forest where it veers around numerous lakes and divides muskeg. The highway serves as an access route to logging and industrial roads which travel deeper into the forest. It crosses the Marchington River approximately 40 km (25 mi) from Sioux Lookout. It ends over 100 km (60 mi) east of Sioux Lookout at Highway 599, approximately 10 km (6 mi) north of Savant Lake and approximately 20 km (12 mi) east of the boundary between Kenora District and Thunder Bay District.

On an average day in 2016, approximately 1,800 vehicles used the highway near Sioux Lookout, while approximately 200 vehicles used it near Highway 599. These represent the heaviest and lightest travelled portions of the route, respectively.

== History ==
Two separate iterations of Highway 516 have existed in Ontario over the years. The first existed between 1956 and 1972 in Muskoka. The current Highway 516 in northwestern Ontario was designated in 1983.

=== Muskoka ===
The original iteration of Highway 516 was designated alongside many other secondary highways by the DHO on May 9, 1956. The highway began in Windermere and travelled east along the southern shore of Three Mile Lake, passing through the village of Ufford along the way. The route briefly turned north concurrent with Highway 532 near Raymond before resuming eastward. It passed through the village of Utterson before ending at Highway 11 (now Greer Road) between Utterson and Port Sydney. The highway was extended east to Port Sydney in 1960, bringing it to its peak length of 26.5 km (16.5 mi). Following the formation of the District Municipality of Muskoka on January 1, 1971, most of the secondary highways within the new district were transferred to it and redesignated as part of its district road system. Highway 516 west of Highway 532 became part of Muskoka District Road 4. Highway 532 was rerouted along the portion of Highway 516 east to Highway 11 and would become Highway 141. The remaining segment east of Highway 11 became Muskoka District Road 10. By 1973, Highway 516 had been decommissioned entirely.

=== Northwestern Ontario ===
During the mid-1970s, a new road was constructed between Sioux Lookout and Highway 599 north of Savant Lake to provide access to the pulpwood and iron ore resources in the area. It was given the unsigned designation of Highway 708, but was better known as the Marchington Lake Road. Although it was completed in 1977, it was not assumed as a provincial highway until 1982 or 1983. Highway 516 first appeared in 1982–83 official Ontario road map as an unpaved route. It is shown as a paved highway on the 1984 official road map. Highway 516 has remain unchanged since then.

== Major intersections ==
The following table lists the major junctions along Highway 516, as noted by the Ministry of Transportation of Ontario.

Division	Location	km	mi	Destinations	Notes
Kenora	Sioux Lookout	0.0	0.0	Highway 642 – Sioux Lookout, Silver Dollar	
Kenora	Sioux Lookout	2.0	1.2	Airport Road	
Kenora	Unorganized Kenora District	30.1	18.7	Vermilion Bay Road	
Kenora	Unorganized Kenora District	41.2	25.6	Marchington River Bridge	
Thunder Bay	Unorganized Thunder Bay District	62.1	38.6	Stanzhikimi Lake Road	
Thunder Bay	Unorganized Thunder Bay District	88.2	54.8	Bowl Lake Road	
Thunder Bay	Unorganized Thunder Bay District	103.6	64.4	Highway 599 – Central Patricia, Ignace	
1.000 mi = 1.609 km; 1.000 km = 0.621 mi
