= McIntosh, Kenora District, Ontario =

McIntosh
- Location of McIntosh in Ontario
- Coordinates: 49°58′46″N 93°36′39″W
- Country: Canada
- Province: Ontario
- Region: Northwestern Ontario
- District: Kenora
- Part: Kenora, Unorganized
- Elevation: 380 m (1,250 ft)
- Time zone: UTC-6 (Central Time Zone)
  - Summer (DST): UTC-5 (Central Time Zone)
- Postal code FSA: P0X
- Area code: 807

McIntosh is an unincorporated place on Canyon Lake on the Canyon River in Unorganized Kenora District in northwestern Ontario, Canada. It lies on the Canadian National Railway transcontinental main line, between Canyon to the west and Quibell to the east, and is passed but not served by Via Rail transcontinental Canadian trains. The community can be accessed by road using the continuation of Ontario Highway 647 that arrives from the southeast from the community of Vermilion Bay, on Ontario Highway 17, via Blue Lake Provincial Park.

== McIntosh Indian Residential School ==
The community was once home to McIntosh Indian Residential School, a residential school opened by the Catholic Church in 1924. The school was located between Forest Lake and Canyon Lake. The main school building was burned down by a fire in 1969 and only the chapel remains. A memorial sits near the site of the former school as a reminder of the forced assimilation and abuse to generations of Indigenous children.
