= Sunstrum, Ontario =

Sunstrum
- Location of Sunstrum in Ontario
- Coordinates: 50°02′41″N 92°33′38″W
- Country: Canada
- Province: Ontario
- Region: Northwestern Ontario
- District: Kenora
- Part: Kenora, Unorganized
- Elevation: 402 m (1,319 ft)
- Time zone: UTC-6 (Central Time Zone)
  - Summer (DST): UTC-5 (Central Time Zone)
- Postal code FSA: P0V
- Area code: 807

Sunstrum is an unincorporated place and railway point in Unorganized Kenora District in northwestern Ontario, Canada.

It is on the Canadian National Railway transcontinental main line, between Millidge to the west and Taggart to the east, and is passed but not served by Via Rail transcontinental Canadian trains.
