= Ontario Highway 525 =

Ontario provincial highway

Highway 525

Route information
- Maintained by Ministry of Transportation of Ontario
- Length: 35.4 km (22.0 mi)
- Existed: 1956–1972 (in Gravenhurst); 1982–present

Major junctions
- South end: Highway 596 near Minaki
- North end: Islington Indian Reserve entrance

Location
- Country: Canada
- Province: Ontario
- Divisions: Kenora District
- Major cities: Whitedog

Highway system
- Ontario provincial highways; Current; Former; 400-series
← Highway 524	→ Highway 526

Secondary Highway 525, commonly referred to as Highway 525, is a provincially maintained secondary highway in the Canadian province of Ontario. It is a short, remote secondary highway that links Highway 596 to the Wabaseemoong First Nations reserve. It is the second-westernmost secondary highway in the province, Highway 673 being the first. The route was commissioned by 1982 along what was formerly Highway 596; a former use of the route number existed between 1956 and 1973 in Gravenhurst.

== Route description ==
Highway 525 is a very remote highway in northwestern Ontario. There are no settlements along its 35.4-kilometre (22.0 mi) length, and the closest human habitation is Minaki near its southern terminus and Whitedog near its northern terminus. The route begins west of Minaki, branching off from Highway 596, which travels south to Kenora. It travels north along a wide strip of land bounded by Sand Lake to the east, and by Swan Lake and Tetu Lake to the west, all part of the Winnipeg River watershed. Zig-zagging in a generally northward direction, the highway passes through thick boreal forest. At approximately its midpoint, the route meets the Cygnet Lake road, which provides access to a remote camp. The highway continues north, curving west immediately before ending at the entrance to the Wabaseemoong (Islington) reserve. The road continues into the reserve to provide access to Caribou Falls and Whitedog.

== History ==
The current Highway 525 is not the original usage of the number. In 1956, the number was one of several dozen Secondary Highways designated by the Department of Highways to improve connections between King's Highways. The highway followed the route of present-day Muskoka District Road 18 north from Highway 11 to the Muskoka Centre. It was decommissioned between early 1972 and late 1973, shortly after the establishment of the District Municipality of Muskoka.

The current Highway 525 was designated by 1982. Prior to that, the road it followed was an extension of Highway 596 that was designated in the mid-1970s. The route was gravel surfaced when it was assumed, but has since been paved.

== Major intersections ==
The following table lists the major junctions along Highway 525, as noted by the Ministry of Transportation of Ontario. The entire route is located in Kenora District.

Location	km	mi	Destinations	Notes
Unorganized Kenora District	0.0	0.0	Highway 596 – Kenora, Minaki	
Unorganized Kenora District	35.4	22.0	Islington Indian Reserve entrance	Road continues towards Whitedog and Caribou Falls
1.000 mi = 1.609 km; 1.000 km = 0.621 mi
