= Webster, Ontario =

Webster
- Location of Webster in Ontario
- Coordinates: 50°05′47″N 92°21′06″W
- Country: Canada
- Province: Ontario
- Region: Northwestern Ontario
- District: Kenora
- Part: Kenora, Unorganized
- Elevation: 381 m (1,250 ft)
- Time zone: UTC-6 (Central Time Zone)
  - Summer (DST): UTC-5 (Central Time Zone)
- Postal code FSA: P0V
- Area code: 807

Webster is an unincorporated place and important railway point in Unorganized Kenora District in northwestern Ontario, Canada. It is located on Webster Bay on Lost Lake on the English River, part of the Nelson River drainage basin.

It is on the Canadian National Railway transcontinental main line, between Taggart to the west and Hudson to the east, and is passed but not served by Via Rail transcontinental Canadian trains.
