= Millidge, Ontario =

Millidge
- Location of Millidge in Ontario
- Coordinates: 50°00′12″N 92°41′56″W
- Country: Canada
- Province: Ontario
- Region: Northwestern Ontario
- District: Kenora
- Part: Kenora, Unorganized
- Elevation: 404 m (1,325 ft)
- Time zone: UTC-6 (Central Time Zone)
  - Summer (DST): UTC-5 (Central Time Zone)
- Postal code FSA: P0V
- Area code: 807

Millidge is an unincorporated place and railway point in Unorganized Kenora District in northwestern Ontario, Canada.

It is on the Canadian National Railway transcontinental main line, between Richan to the west and Sunstrum to the east, has a passing track, and is passed but not served by Via Rail transcontinental Canadian trains.
