= Ontario Highway 658 =

Ontario provincial highway

Highway 658

Route information
- Maintained by the Ministry of Transportation of Ontario
- Length: 25.3 km (15.7 mi)
- History: Highway 128 (1956–1975); Highway 666 (1975–1985)

Major junctions
- South end: Highway 17 – Kenora
- North end: CNR Station in Redditt

Location
- Country: Canada
- Province: Ontario
- Districts: Kenora District

Highway system
- Ontario provincial highways; Current; Former; 400-series
← Highway 657	→ Highway 661
Former provincial highways
Highway 659 →

Secondary Highway 658, commonly referred to as Highway 658, is a provincially maintained highway in the Canadian province of Ontario, located in Kenora District. The highway extends 25.3 kilometres (15.7 mi) between the city of Kenora and the community of Redditt. For a decade, Highway 658 was numbered as Highway 666, leading to numerous sign thefts and a petition by members of a church on the route. This petition eventually led to the route being renumbered in late 1985.

== Route description ==
Highway 658 is a 25.3 kilometres (15.7 mi) highway located within Kenora District northwest of the city of Kenora. It travels through communities lying north of Highway 17A, the Trans-Canada Highway. It is mostly rural, being surrounded by ranches and equipment sheds as well as the boreal forest and rock outcroppings of the Canadian Shield. In the town of Redditt, the highway ends at a train station served by Via Rail.

== History ==
Highway 658
- Location: Sudbury District
- Length: 19.3 km (12.0 mi)
- Existed: 1966–1973
- History: Present-day Municipal Road 4

Highway 658 was originally designated on July 21, 1966, travelling north from Highway 17, west of Whitefish. The route was 19.3 kilometres (12.0 mi) long, passing west through Worthington and turning north to near Fairbank Provincial Park. This route and most other secondary highways in the area were transferred to the Regional Municipality of Sudbury when it was established on January 1, 1973, and is now known as Greater Sudbury Municipal Road 4.

The current iteration of Highway 658 was originally designated as Highway 128, a route which came into existence on January 18, 1956. In 1975, the route was one of several King's Highways redesignated as Secondary Highways; it was given the number 666. Local residents and two churches located along the route began to petition the MTO in 1982, requesting the number be changed due to concerns with its connotation as the "number of the beast". The route number was officially changed to 658 on November 1, 1985, though signs indicating "Formerly Highway 666" were attached to reassurance markers along the highway.

== Major intersections ==
The following table lists the major junctions along Highway 658, as noted by the Ministry of Transportation of Ontario. The entire route is located in Kenora District.

Location	km	mi	Destinations	Notes
Kenora	−3.7	−2.3	Highway 17 / TCH – Kenora	Beginning of former Connecting Link agreement
Kenora	0.0	0.0	Highway 17A – Thunder Bay, Winnipeg	End of former connecting link agreement
Kenora	4.1	2.5	Peterson Road	
Kenora	12.3	7.6	Highway 659 (Coker Road)	
Redditt	25.3	15.7	Redditt Canadian National Railway station	
1.000 mi = 1.609 km; 1.000 km = 0.621 mi
