= Laclu, Ontario =

Laclu
- Location of Laclu in Ontario
- Coordinates: 49°46′27″N 94°43′18″W
- Country: Canada
- Province: Ontario
- Region: Northwestern Ontario
- District: Kenora
- Part: Kenora, Unorganized
- Elevation: 334 m (1,096 ft)
- Time zone: UTC-6 (Central Time Zone)
  - Summer (DST): UTC-5 (Central Time Zone)
- Postal code FSA: P0X
- Area code: 807

Laclu is the name of two adjacent places, one an unincorporated area and locality and the other an unincorporated area and railway point, in Unorganized Kenora District in northwestern Ontario, Canada. Both are just west of the city of Kenora on Lake Lulu, into which flows Laclu Creek; the locality is on the north side and the railway point is on the southeast side. Ontario Highway 641 passes through the locality. The railway point lies on the Canadian Pacific Railway transcontinental main line, between Busteed to the west and Keewatin (part of the city of Kenora) to the east, and has a passing track.
