= Ontario Highway 599 =

Ontario provincial highway

Highway 599

Route information
- Maintained by Ministry of Transportation of Ontario
- Length: 291.0 km (180.8 mi)
- Existed: 1956–present

Major junctions
- South end: Highway 17 in Ignace
- Highway 642 in Silver Dollar; Highway 516 near Savant Lake
- North end: NORT Road in Central Patricia

Location
- Country: Canada
- Province: Ontario
- Districts: Kenora; Thunder Bay
- Towns: Ignace, Silver Dollar, Savant Lake, New Osnaburgh, Pickle Lake

Highway system
- Ontario provincial highways; Current; Former; 400-series
← Highway 597	→ Highway 600

Secondary Highway 599, commonly referred to as Highway 599, is a provincially maintained secondary highway in the Canadian province of Ontario. The 291.0 km (180.8 mi) route connects Highway 17 near Ignace with the remote northern community of Pickle Lake; its terminus at Pickle Lake marks the northernmost point on the provincial highway system. Highway 599 was first assigned in 1956 between Savant Lake and Pickle Lake, although it did not connect with the rest of the provincial highway system at the time. Construction to link it with Highway 17 in Ignace took place between 1958 and 1966. The northern end of Highway 599 is one of two possible starting points for a road to the Ring of Fire mineral deposits, the other being Highway 584 in Nakina.

== Route description ==
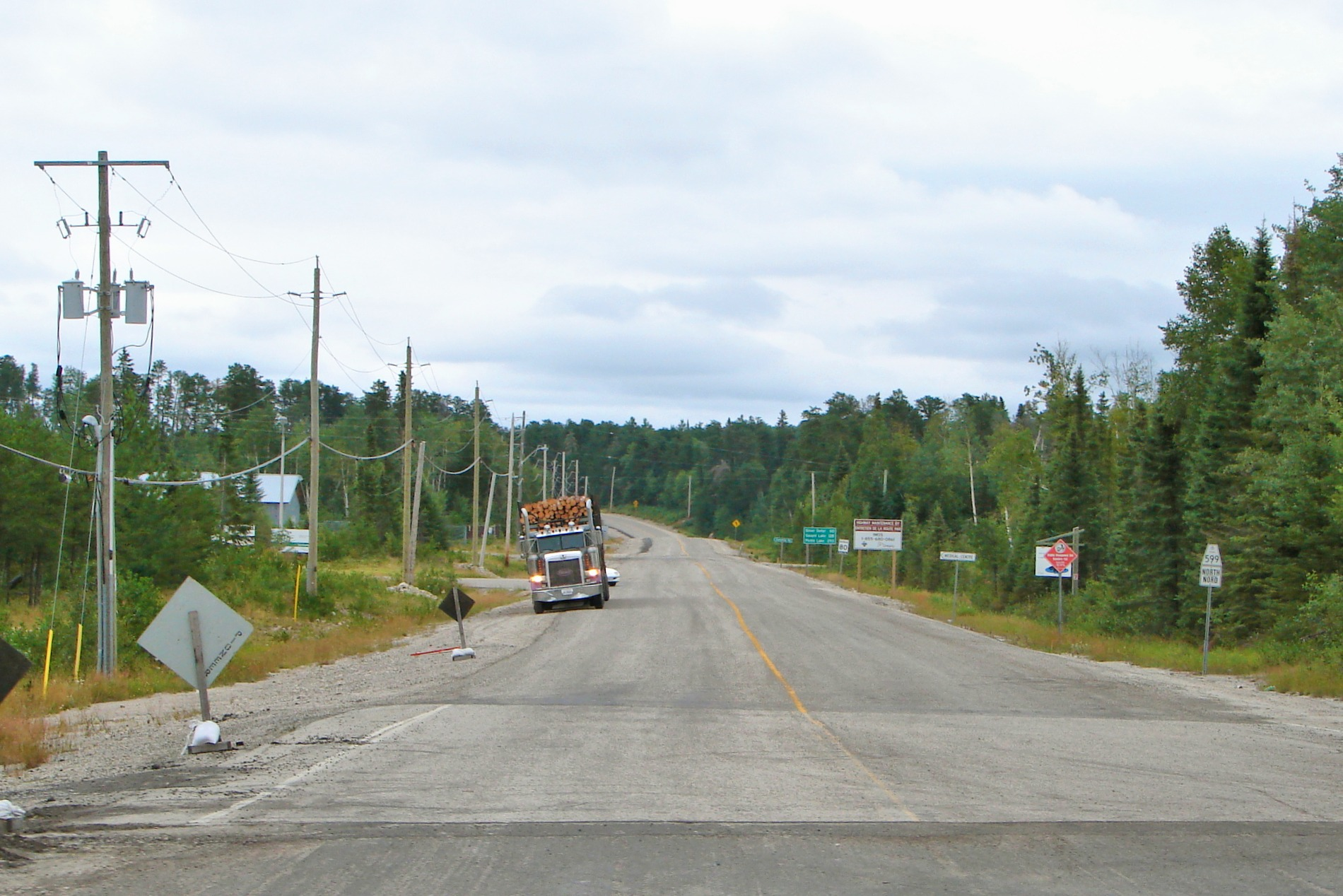
The start of Highway 599 at Ignace

Highway 599 is a long and isolated road in Northwestern Ontario that travels generally southwest–northeast through the dense forests, lakes and hills of Thunder Bay and Kenora District. It begins at the Trans-Canada Highway (Highway 17) near Ignace and ends in Musselwhite Mine, 291.0 km (180.8 mi) to the north. It is the longest secondary highway in Ontario, as well as the northernmost all-season road in Ontario. There are almost no services along Highway 599, including fuel and lodging, outside of Ignace and Pickle Lake. The route is a two-laned paved highway throughout its length.

Beginning at Highway 17 in Ignace, Highway 599 proceeds northeast along the eastern edge of the town. It turns north and crosses the Canadian Pacific Railway. The route turns east and curves around Sandbar Lake, providing access to Sandbar Lake Provincial Park as it curves northeast into the wilderness. Highway 599 meanders around numerous lakes and through uninhabited forests, not encountering any habitation for nearly 50 km (31 mi). It then enters the small community of Silver Dollar, where Highway 642 branches west to Sioux Lookout. Services are available in Silver Dollar at the Silver Dollar Inn.

North of Silver Dollar, Highway 599 re-enters the wilderness for 67 km (42 mi), although several outfitters are located along the otherwise barren stretch. It travels around Savant Lake, crossing the Canadian National Railway transcontinental mainline at the Savant Lake VIA station and later providing access to the small community of O'Briens Landing, Ontario. Approximately 9 km (6 mi) north of Savant Lake, it encounters Highway 516, which branches west towards Sioux Lookout.

Highway 599 provides access to the Ojibway Nation of Saugeen approximately 14 km (8.7 mi) north of Highway 516. It continues through forest, skirting the eastern edge of St Raphael Provincial Park before wrapping around the eastern shores of Lake St. Joseph. The route provides access to the Mishkeegogamang First Nation and the community of New Osnaburgh on the lake, before continuing into forest for the final leg of its journey to Pickle Lake. It ends at Cohen Avenue in Central Patricia, where it continues as the Northern Ontario Resource Trail (NORT Road), which used to be a part of Highway 599, and then Highway 808. The Resource Trail is paved for the first 3 kilometres (1.9 mi) of its length, and is gravel for the remainder. It links up with winter roads that travel to isolated communities even farther north, terminating at the northern shore of Windigo Lake.

== History ==
Highway 599 was initially constructed by the Department of Mines and Forestry in the early 1950s, opening from Savant Lake to Pickle Lake in 1955. In early 1956, that road was assumed by the Department of Highways and incorporated as part of the new secondary highway network, with the designation of Highway 599. Unlike most other secondary highways, it was not possible to access the new highway by car from the rest of the province.

In 1958, construction began to connect the route with Highway 17 near Ignace, working south from Savant Lake. By 1963, Highway 599 was opened to the community of Valora, where it connected with the Ignace–Valora Road. On February 15, the province signed an "industrial road agreement", which opened the Ignace–Valora Road to the general public, connecting Highway 599 with the rest of the province. Despite this, work continued on a paved road to bypass the winding industrial road. In 1963 construction began from the Highway 17 end. The road was completed in the middle by 1966.

In 2017, the provincial government of Ontario pledged support for the construction of a road that would extend Highway 599 to connect Nibinamik, Webequie and the Northern Ontario Ring of Fire to the provincial road network.

== Major intersections ==
The following table lists the major junctions along Highway 599, as noted by the Ministry of Transportation of Ontario.

Division	Location	km	mi	Destinations	Notes
Kenora	Ignace	0.0	0.0	Highway 17 / TCH – Kenora, Thunder Bay	Trans-Canada Highway
Kenora	Silver Dollar	59.6	37.0	Highway 642 – Sioux Lookout	
Thunder Bay	Savant Lake	126.6	78.7	Savant Lake station (VIA Rail)	Canadian National (CN) railway crossing
Thunder Bay	Unorganized Thunder Bay District	135.5	84.2	Highway 516 – Sioux Lookout	
Thunder Bay	Unorganized Thunder Bay District	222.4	138.2	Austin's Road (west); Pashokokogan Lake Road (east)	
Kenora	Unorganized Kenora District	255.4	158.7	Rat River Bridge	
Kenora	Pickle Lake	290.4	180.4	Pickle Lake Road	
Kenora	Central Patricia	291.0	180.8		Highway 599 ends; road continues as NORT Road to north side of Windigo Lake as the most northerly all-season road accessible by car in Ontario
1.000 mi = 1.609 km; 1.000 km = 0.621 mi
