= Melgund =

Melgund may refer to:

- Melgund Castle, in Angus, Scotland
- Melgund, Ontario, a local service board and geographic township in Kenora District, Ontario, Canada
