= Ycliff, Ontario =

Ycliff
- Location of Ycliff in Ontario
- Coordinates: 50°11′12″N 91°08′31″W
- Country: Canada
- Province: Ontario
- Region: Northwestern Ontario
- District: Kenora
- Part: Kenora, Unorganized
- Elevation: 402 m (1,319 ft)
- Time zone: UTC-6 (Central Time Zone)
  - Summer (DST): UTC-5 (Central Time Zone)
- Postal code FSA: P0T
- Area code: 807

Ycliff is a railway point and unincorporated place in Unorganized Kenora District in northwestern Ontario, Canada.

It lies on the Canadian National Railway transcontinental main line, between Robinson to the west and Fowler to the east, has a passing track, and is passed but not served by Via Rail transcontinental Canadian trains.
