= Quibell, Ontario =

Quibell
- Location of Quibell in Ontario
- Coordinates: 49°57′32″N 93°25′30″W
- Country: Canada
- Province: Ontario
- Region: Northwestern Ontario
- District: Kenora
- Part: Kenora, Unorganized
- Elevation: 349 m (1,145 ft)
- Time zone: UTC-6 (Central Time Zone)
  - Summer (DST): UTC-5 (Central Time Zone)
- Postal code FSA: P0X
- Area code: 807

Quibell is an unincorporated place and railway point in Unorganized Kenora District in northwestern Ontario, Canada. It is named after William A. Quibell (1857-1917), a Police Commissioner in Durham County, Ontario. The Quibell Dam on the Wabigoon River lies 1.7 kilometres (1.1 mi) to the east.

Quibell is on Ontario Highway 609, which arrives from the community of Red Lake Road on Ontario Highway 105 at the east and heads north to Clay Lake. It is also on the Canadian National Railway transcontinental main line, between McIntosh to the west and Red Lake Road to the east, has a passing track, and is passed but not served by Via Rail transcontinental Canadian trains.
