= Dinorwic, Ontario =

Dinorwic
- Unincorporated community
- Location of Dinorwic
- Coordinates: 49°42′N 92°30′W
- Country: Canada
- Province: Ontario
- District: Kenora
- Census area: Unorg. Kenora
- Time zone: UTC−06:00 (CST)
  - Summer (DST): UTC−05:00 (CDT)
- Postal code: P0V 1P0
- Area code: 807

Dinorwic is an unincorporated settlement in northwestern Ontario, Canada. It is situated at the northern head of the lake with the same name, along the Canadian Pacific Railway and Highway 17 (the Trans-Canada Highway) at the junction of Highway 72.

The nearest major community is Dryden, where hospital service is provided.

Dinorwic is named after Dinorwic Quarry, a slate quarry in Wales, UK.

== History ==
Dinorwic was founded when the Canadian Pacific Railway (CPR) was built through the area, and was originally known as Wabigon or Wabigoon.

Circa 1881 or 1882, the Hudson's Bay Company (HBC) established a fur-trade post along the CPR at the mouth of the Wabigoon River. Around the same time, the Eagle Lake Post was relocated nearby. But since the Wabigon Post was situated along the railway, it became more prominent, and until 1884, the clerk at Wabigon was in charge of both posts.

Around 1896, the name Wabigoon was transferred to a new community growing on Wabigoon Lake, and the place was renamed to Dinorwic, possibly named after the hometown of a local Welshman.

Between 1899 and 1901, the HBC post was relocated one mile west next to a CPR station. It didn't operate between 1933 and 1935, and the Dinorwic post closed permanently on December 31, 1965.
