= Taggart, Ontario =

Taggart
- Location of Taggart in Ontario
- Coordinates: 50°05′09″N 92°29′44″W
- Country: Canada
- Province: Ontario
- Region: Northwestern Ontario
- District: Kenora
- Part: Kenora, Unorganized
- Elevation: 401 m (1,316 ft)
- Time zone: UTC-6 (Central Time Zone)
  - Summer (DST): UTC-5 (Central Time Zone)
- Postal code FSA: P0V
- Area code: 807

Taggart is an unincorporated place and railway point in Unorganized Kenora District in northwestern Ontario, Canada.

It is on the Canadian National Railway transcontinental main line, between Sunstrum to the west and Webster to the east, and is passed but not served by Via Rail transcontinental Canadian trains.
