= Blue Lake Provincial Park =

Provincial park in Ontario, Canada

- IUCN category II (national park)
- Location within Ontario
- Interactive map of Blue Lake Provincial Park
- Location: Kenora District, Ontario, Canada
- Nearest town: Machin, Ontario
- Coordinates: 49°53′36″N 93°32′29″W
- Area: 2,314 ha (8.93 sq mi)
- Elevation: 382 m (1,253 ft)
- Established: 1960
- Named for: Blue Lake
- Visitors: 48,919 (in 2022)
- Governing body: Ontario Parks
- Website: https://www.ontarioparks.ca/park/bluelake

Blue Lake Provincial Park is a park in Kenora District, Ontario, Canada, located 10 kilometres (6 mi) northwest of the community of Vermilion Bay. It can be accessed via Ontario Highway 647.
