= Hudson, Kenora District =

Hudson Rolling Portage
- unincorporated place
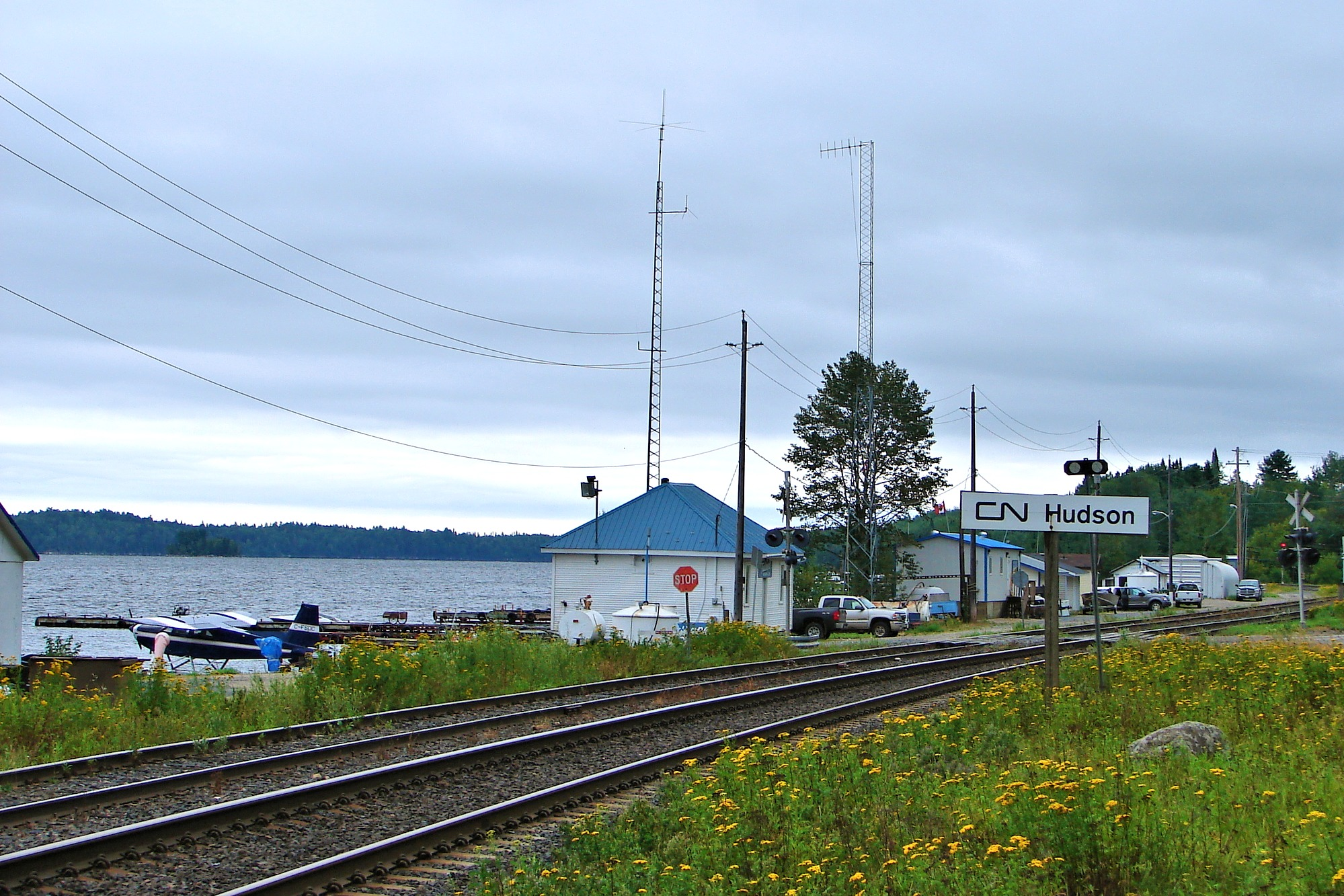

- Location of Hudson in Ontario
- Coordinates: 50°05′28″N 92°10′08″W
- Country: Canada
- Province: Ontario
- Region: Northwestern Ontario
- District: Kenora
- Municipality: Sioux Lookout
- Elevation: 372 m (1,220 ft)
- Time zone: UTC-6 (Central Time Zone)
  - Summer (DST): UTC-5 (Central Time Zone)
- Postal code FSA: P0V
- Area code: 807

Hudson is an unincorporated place and community in the municipality of Sioux Lookout, Kenora District in Northwestern Ontario, Canada. It is located on Lost Lake on the English River in the Nelson River drainage basin.

== History ==
The National Transcontinental Railway was built through the area in the 1900s and the railway station at Hudson opened in 1910. It was originally called Rolling Portage (referring to freight that was portaged across Hudson from Lost Lake to Vermilion Lake) and the first post office was established there in 1919.

In 1911 or 1912, the Hudson's Bay Company (HBC) opened a fur-trade outpost and store in Hudson, which became a full post in 1915. The store became part of the HBC Northern Stores Department in 1959, and was replaced by a new building in 1964. In 1987, HBC divested the Northern Stores Department to The North West Company.

Before roads were built to Red Lake, Hudson was a transportation hub for transshipment, first between trains and boat traffic going north, and later for air cargo as well. By 1929/1930, Hudson had the second busiest cargo airport in North America (after Chicago). Once the roads reached Red Lake by 1948, Hudson began to decline and forestry became the main economic activity.

== Demographics ==
In the 2021 Census of Population conducted by Statistics Canada, Hudson had a population of 266 living in 114 of its 124 total private dwellings, a change of −1.5% from its 2016 population of 270. With a land area of 17.11 km^{2} (6.61 sq mi), it had a population density of 15.5/km^{2} (40.3/sq mi) in 2021.

== Transportation ==
Hudson is on the Canadian National Railway transcontinental main line, between Webster to the west and Pelican to the east, and is passed but not served by Via Rail transcontinental Canadian trains.

It is also the western terminus of Ontario Highway 664, which connects to Ontario Highway 72 southwest of the town centre of Sioux Lookout.

== Media ==
=== Radio ===
Hudson is the location of two radio station repeaters: CBLS-FM (Sioux Lookout), a repeater of CBQT-FM, CBC Radio One in Thunder Bay, and CKDR-3, a repeater of CKDR-FM in Dryden.
