= Red Lake Road, Ontario =

Red Lake Road
- Etymology: road to town of Red Lake
- Location of Red Lake Road in Ontario
- Coordinates: 49°58′25″N 93°21′29″W
- Country: Canada
- Province: Ontario
- Region: Northwestern Ontario
- District: Kenora
- Part: Kenora, Unorganized
- Elevation: 360 m (1,180 ft)
- Time zone: UTC-6 (Central Time Zone)
  - Summer (DST): UTC-5 (Central Time Zone)
- Postal code FSA: P0V
- Area code: 807

Red Lake Road is an unincorporated place and community in Unorganized Kenora District in northwestern Ontario, Canada. It is named for the road, today's Ontario Highway 105, that runs from the community of Vermilion Bay in the south to the town of Red Lake in the north. Red Lake Road is at the junction of Highway 105 with the eastern terminus of Ontario Highway 609, which runs west to the community of Quibell and onward to its northern terminus at Clay Lake.

Red Lake Road railway station is in the community. The station is on the Canadian National Railway transcontinental main line, between Quibell to the west and Lash to the east, has a passing track, and is served by Via Rail transcontinental Canadian trains.
