= Umfreville, Ontario =

Settlement in Ontario, Canada

Coordinates: 49.866°N 91.465°W

Location of Umfreville in Ontario

Umfreville is a community in the Kenora District of Ontario, located along Highway 642 southeast of Sioux Lookout.
