= Savant Lake =

- Location of Savant Lake in Ontario
- Coordinates: 50°14′19″N 90°42′31″W
- Country: Canada
- Province: Ontario
- Region: Northwestern Ontario
- District: Thunder Bay

Government
  - Type: local services board
  - MP: Bob Nault (Kenora, LPC)
  - MPP: Greg Rickford (Kenora—Rainy River, PC)
- Elevation: 430 m (1,410 ft)
- Time zone: UTC-6 (CST)
  - Summer (DST): UTC-5 (CDT)
- Postal Code: P0V 2S0
- Area code: 807

Savant Lake is an unincorporated place and community in Unorganized Thunder Bay District in northwestern Ontario, Canada.

== History ==
The town was founded when the National Transcontinental Railway was built in the early 1900s. It was originally named Bucke, after a civil engineer in charge of building the railroad. In 1928, after it was found that there already was another town of the same name in Ontario (Bucke Township, now amalgamated in Temiskaming Shores), it was renamed after the name of the lake north of the town, Lake Savant.

In 1901, gold was discovered on Lake Savant. Therefore, in 1905, the Saint Anthony Goldmine located south of the town opened. It serviced the town until it was closed in 1941.

In 1913, CN Savant Lake railroad station was built. Until 1959, the main form of transportation was dog teams until Highway 599 was completed.

In 1918, the Hudson's Bay Company opened a fur-trade post along the railway at Bucke in order to forestall competition. From 1935 on, the post operated a fur-trade outpost at the St. Anthony Mine. The Bucke Post closed in 1938 and the post at St. Anthony Mine operated briefly as a full post, until operations were moved to Dinorwic and it too closed that same year.

In 1973, Hydro (electricity) was brought in.

== Transportation ==
Savant Lake is on Highway 599, roughly halfway between Ignace and Pickle Lake. The community is also connected to Sioux Lookout via Highway 516, and is the proposed northern terminus of an extension of Highway 811, if the extension is ever built.

Savant Lake is on the Canadian National Railway transcontinental main line, between Fowler to the west and the Staunton railway flag stop to the east. Savant Lake railway station is on the line and is served by Via Rail transcontinental Canadian trains.

Savant Lake (Sturgeon Lake) Water Aerodrome is located 3.5 nautical miles (6.5 km) southeast of the community.

== Local media ==
=== Television ===
- CBWDT-03 (channel 8) (CBC)
- CICA-63 (channel 10) (TVO)

== See also ==
- Northern District School Area Board
- Ojibway Nation of Saugeen
