= Greater Oxdrift =

Local services board in Kenora, Ontario, Canada

Coordinates: 49°50′00″N 93°00′00″W

Greater Oxdrift is a local services board in Kenora District in northwestern Ontario, Canada. It provides services to the geographic townships of Aubrey, Britton, Brownbridge, Eton, Rugby, Van Horne, Wainwright, and Zealand and was created in 2009.

Its service area is immediately adjacent to the incorporated municipalities of Machin and Dryden, and includes the named dispersed rural communities of Oxdrift and Eton-Rugby.

Oxdrift is the administrative headquarters of the Eagle Lake First Nations band government.
