= Wabigoon, Ontario =

Unincorporated community in Ontario, Canada

Coordinates: 49.717°N 92.600°W

Wabigoon is an unincorporated community in the Canadian province of Ontario, located in the Kenora District.

The community is located on Highway 17, approximately 20 kilometres east of Dryden and seven kilometres west of Dinorwic.

A designated place served by a local services board, Wabigoon had a population of 417 in the Canada 2006 Census.

== Demographics ==
In the 2021 Census of Population conducted by Statistics Canada, Wabigoon had a population of 419 living in 174 of its 195 total private dwellings, a change of 12.3% from its 2016 population of 373. With a land area of 50.53 km^{2} (19.51 sq mi), it had a population density of 8.3/km^{2} (21.5/sq mi) in 2021.
