= Melgund, Ontario =

Melgund
- Geographic township
- Location in Ontario
- Coordinates: 49°35′09″N 92°20′47″W
- Country: Canada
- Province: Ontario
- District: Kenora
- Part: Unorganized

Government
  - MP: Eric Melillo
  - MPP: Greg Rickford
- Elevation: 373 m (1,224 ft)
- Time zone: UTC-6 (Central Time Zone)
  - Summer (DST): UTC-5 (Central Time Zone)
- Postal code FSA: P0V
- Area code: 807
- Website: melgundtownship.ca

Melgund is a geographic township and local services board in the Unorganized Part of Kenora District in northwestern Ontario, Canada. It has two unincorporated communities, Dyment and Borups Corners, and is counted as part of Kenora, Unorganized, Northern Ontario in Statistics Canada census data.

Ontario Highway 603 travels for its entire length between Dyment and Borups Corners.

== Dyment ==
Dyment is the larger of Melgund Township’s two unincorporated communities and serves as the township’s main residential and community centre. It is home to the Dyment Recreation Hall, the Dyment Museum, and several local facilities that host seasonal gatherings, heritage displays, and community arts programs. The area developed along the former railway line and continues to function as a local hub for events, services, and outdoor recreation on nearby Melgund Lake.

== Borups Corners ==
Borups Corners is a small rural settlement located at the southern end of Melgund Township along Ontario Highway 603. The community is surrounded by mixed boreal forest and agricultural land and is known for its quiet setting and proximity to trails, lakes, and conservation areas. Local residents participate in township-wide arts and land-based activities, maintaining traditions that reflect the rural character and northern environment of the Kenora District.

== Arts, Culture, and Recreation ==
Melgund Township supports a variety of community-based arts, heritage, and recreation programs centred in its two unincorporated communities, Dyment and Borups Corners.

The Dyment Recreation Hall serves as a multipurpose venue for seasonal festivals, local art showcases, and youth-led cultural events. Nearby, the Dyment Museum preserves and exhibits regional history, including displays on early settlement, rail heritage, and the social history of Northwestern Ontario.

In Borups Corners, community members engage in land-based and outdoor arts activities that reflect the township’s northern landscape and traditions. These include photography, nature-based workshops, and small community gatherings celebrating rural arts and crafts.

Outdoor recreation is an important part of community life throughout Melgund. The Melgund Lake Conservation Reserve, located near Dyment, offers canoeing, fishing, and hiking opportunities, along with seasonal activities such as ice fishing at the Dyment Ice Shack. Together, these facilities and programs reflect the township’s commitment to sustainable tourism, arts engagement, and the preservation of the boreal environment.
