= Kenora Airport =

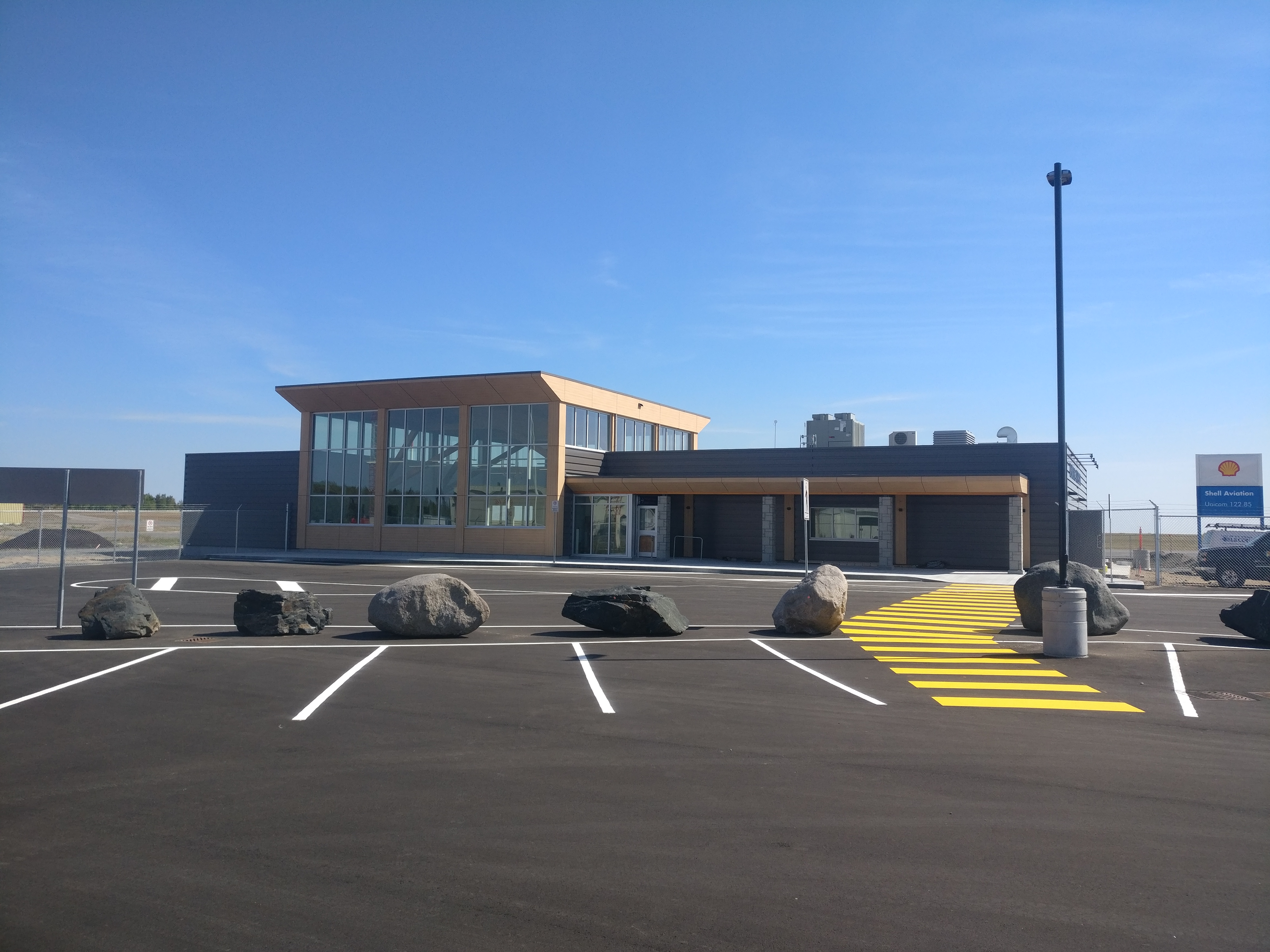
- McDougald International Terminal

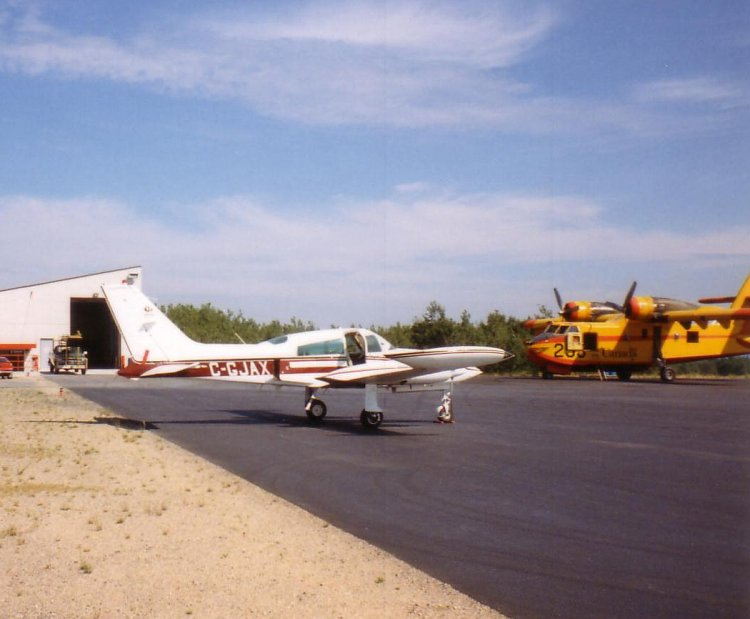
- Ministry of Natural Resources CL-125 and Cessna 310 at Kenora
- IATA: YQK; ICAO: CYQK; WMO: 71850

Summary
- Airport type: Public
- Operator: Kenora Airport Authority Inc.
- Location: Kenora, Ontario
- Time zone: CST (UTC−06:00)
  - Summer (DST): CDT (UTC−05:00)
- Elevation AMSL: 1,344 ft / 410 m
- Coordinates: 49°47′18″N 094°21′47″W
- Website: Kenora Airport

Map
- Location in Ontario CYQK (Canada)

Runways
Direction	Length		Surface
Direction	ft	m	Surface
08/26	5,800	1,768	Asphalt

Statistics (2010)
- Aircraft movements: 13,957
- Sources: Canada Flight Supplement; Environment Canada; Movements from Statistics Canada

Kenora Airport (IATA: YQK, ICAO: CYQK) is located 5 nautical miles (9.3 km; 5.8 mi) east northeast of Kenora, Ontario, Canada. The airport is classified as an airport of entry by Nav Canada and is staffed by the Canada Border Services Agency (CBSA) on a call-out basis from the Fort Frances-International Falls International Bridge. CBSA officers at this airport can handle general aviation aircraft with no more than 15 passengers. The airport has one asphalt runway that is 5,800 by 150 ft (1,768 by 46 m). The airport is under Aircraft Group Number (AGN) classification of IV.

The airport was one of three finalists for the WestJet Innovation & Excellence Award for the Canadian Tourism Awards 2018, along with Vancouver International Airport and Quebec City Airport.

== Airlines and destinations ==
Airlines	Destinations
North Star Air	Thunder Bay

Bearskin Airlines had served Kenora Airport until May 11, 2024.

== See also ==
- Kenora Water Aerodrome
