= Silver Dollar, Ontario =

Community in Ontario, Canada

Coordinates: 49.801°N 91.179°W

Location of Silver Dollar in Ontario

Silver Dollar is a community in the Kenora District of Ontario, located at the junction of Highway 599 and Highway 642.

== Economy ==
Silver Dollar Inn and Campground is a camping and outfitter store supplying hunters and anglers visiting nearby lakes. The Inn host a campground for trailers and recreational vehicles. The inn's Can-Op is the first service station available for motorist before heading north on Highway 599.

== Services ==
Salt barn on Highway 642 just off Highway 599 services both roadways in winter months.
