= Machin, Ontario =

Machin
- Township (single-tier)
- Township of Machin
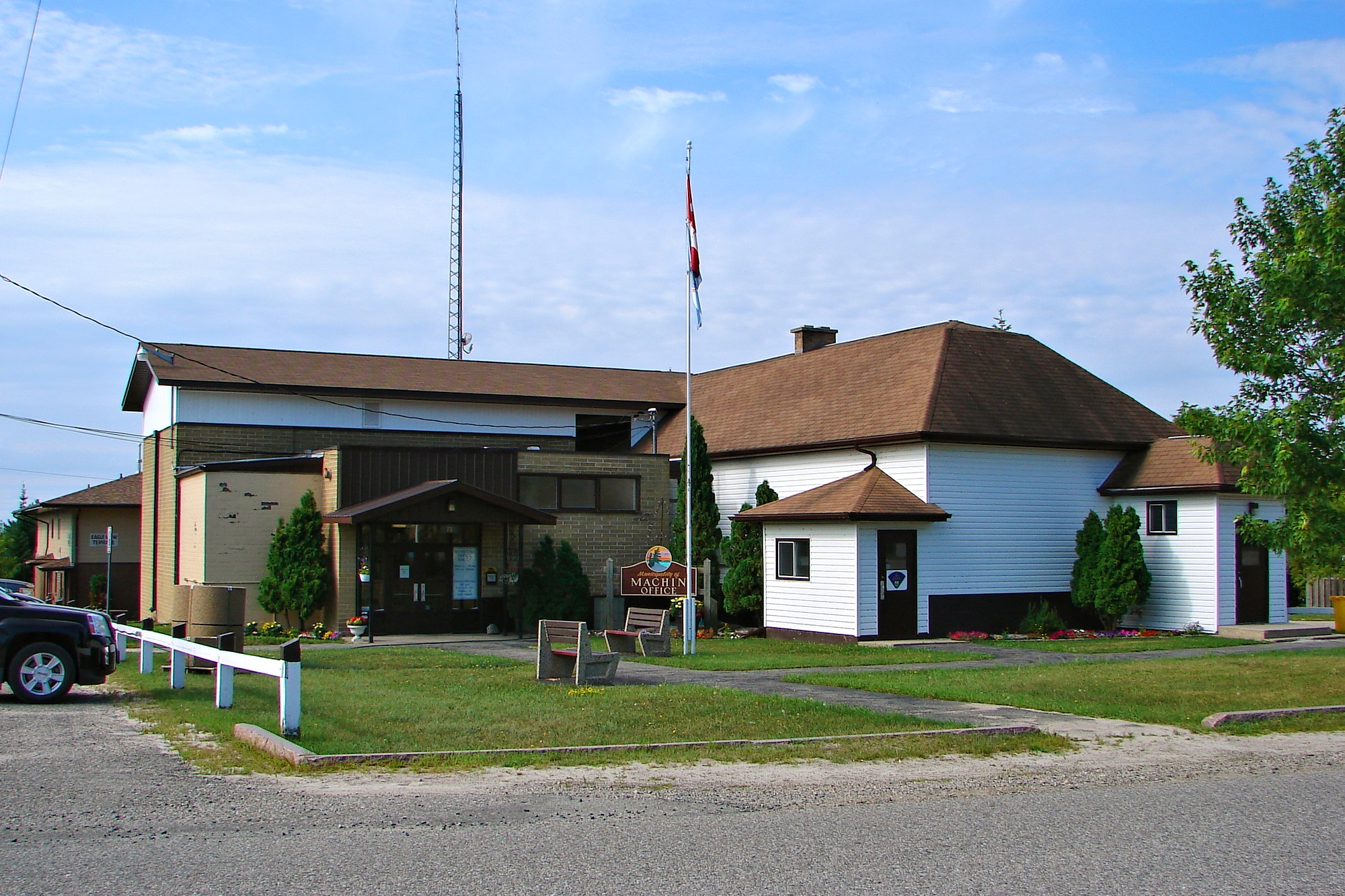
- Township office in Vermilion Bay

- Location within Ontario
- Coordinates: 49°47′N 93°10′W
- Country: Canada
- Province: Ontario
- District: Kenora
- Incorporated: 1909

Government
  - Mayor: Gordon Griffiths
  - Federal riding: Kenora—Kiiwetinoong
  - Prov. riding: Kenora—Rainy River

Area
  - Land: 290.14 km^{2} (112.02 sq mi)

Population (2021)
  - Total: 1,012
  - Density: 3.5/km^{2} (9.1/sq mi)
- Time zone: UTC-6 (CST)
  - Summer (DST): UTC-5 (CDT)
- Postal Code FSA: P0V
- Area code: 807
- Website: www.visitmachin.com

Machin is a township in the Canadian province of Ontario, located in the Kenora District west of Dryden.

The township, named after Harold A.C. Machin, consists of 2 non-contiguous areas on the north shore of Eagle Lake. The junction of Highway 17 and Highway 105 is located in Machin, just east of Vermilion Bay.

== Communities ==
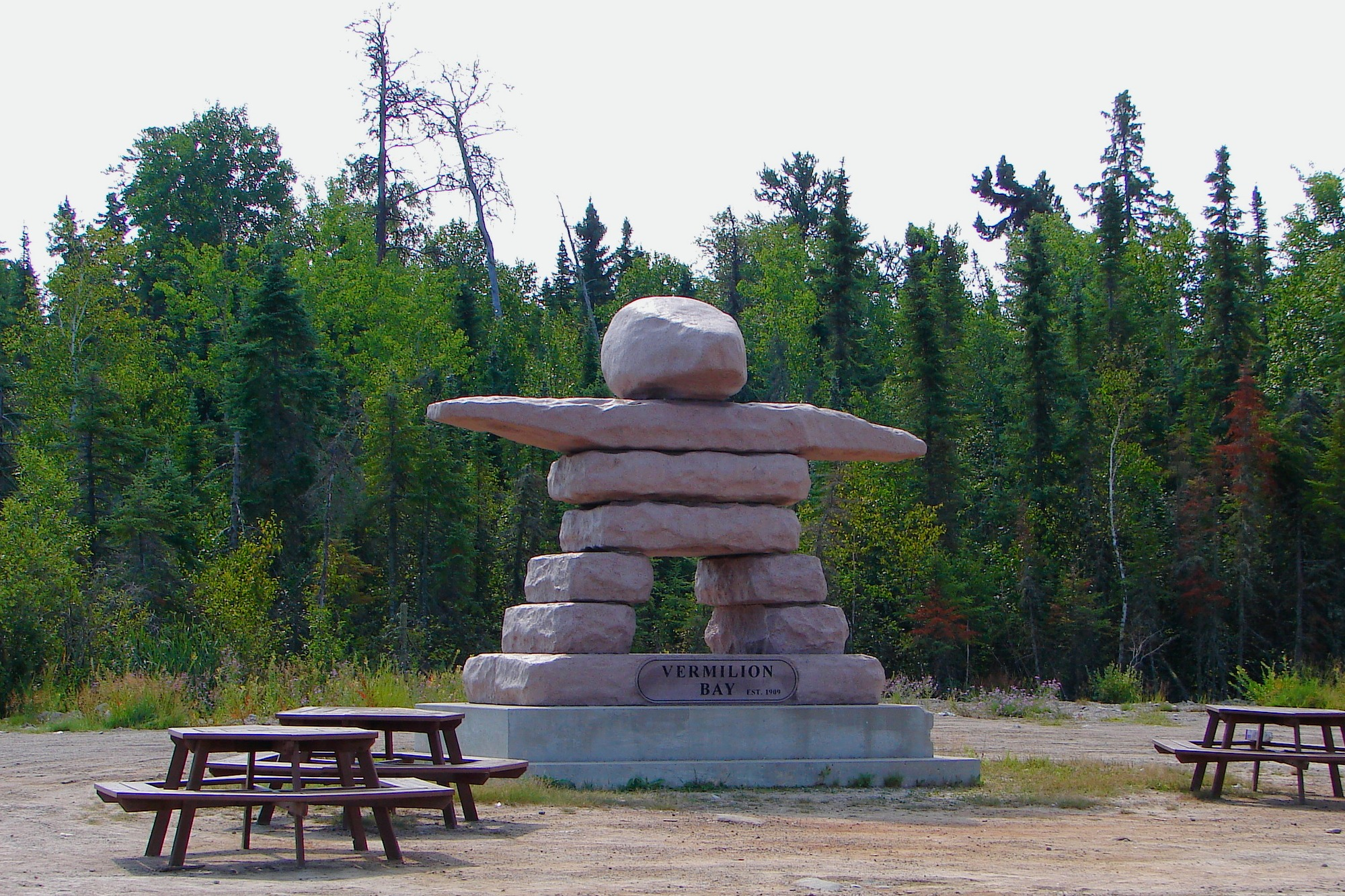
Vermilion Bay, Ontario

The main communities in Machin township are Eagle River (49°47′31″N 93°11′41″W), Minnitaki (49°48′46″N 93°5′41″W), and Vermilion Bay (49°51′23″N 93°22′55″W).

=== Eagle River ===
The community of Eagle River has its origin as a Hudson's Bay Company fur-trading post on Eagle Lake, founded in 1869. It operated seasonally in the winter until 1882, when the post was moved to Wabigoon Lake. By that time, the Canadian Pacific Railway was built through the area and the settlement grew where the railroad crosses the namesake Eagle River. In the 1890s, Eagle River was an important coal and water supply station for the railroad, while shipping out wood and fur.

Trade at Eagle River ceased in 1903. In 1928, a hydro-electric power station was built on the river (and another one in 1937). Around 1935/1936, the first fishing and hunting lodge was built on Eagle Lake. The community lost later its importance as a railroad hub, and in 1968 and 1969, railway docks were removed and its train station was demolished in 1973.

=== Minnitaki ===
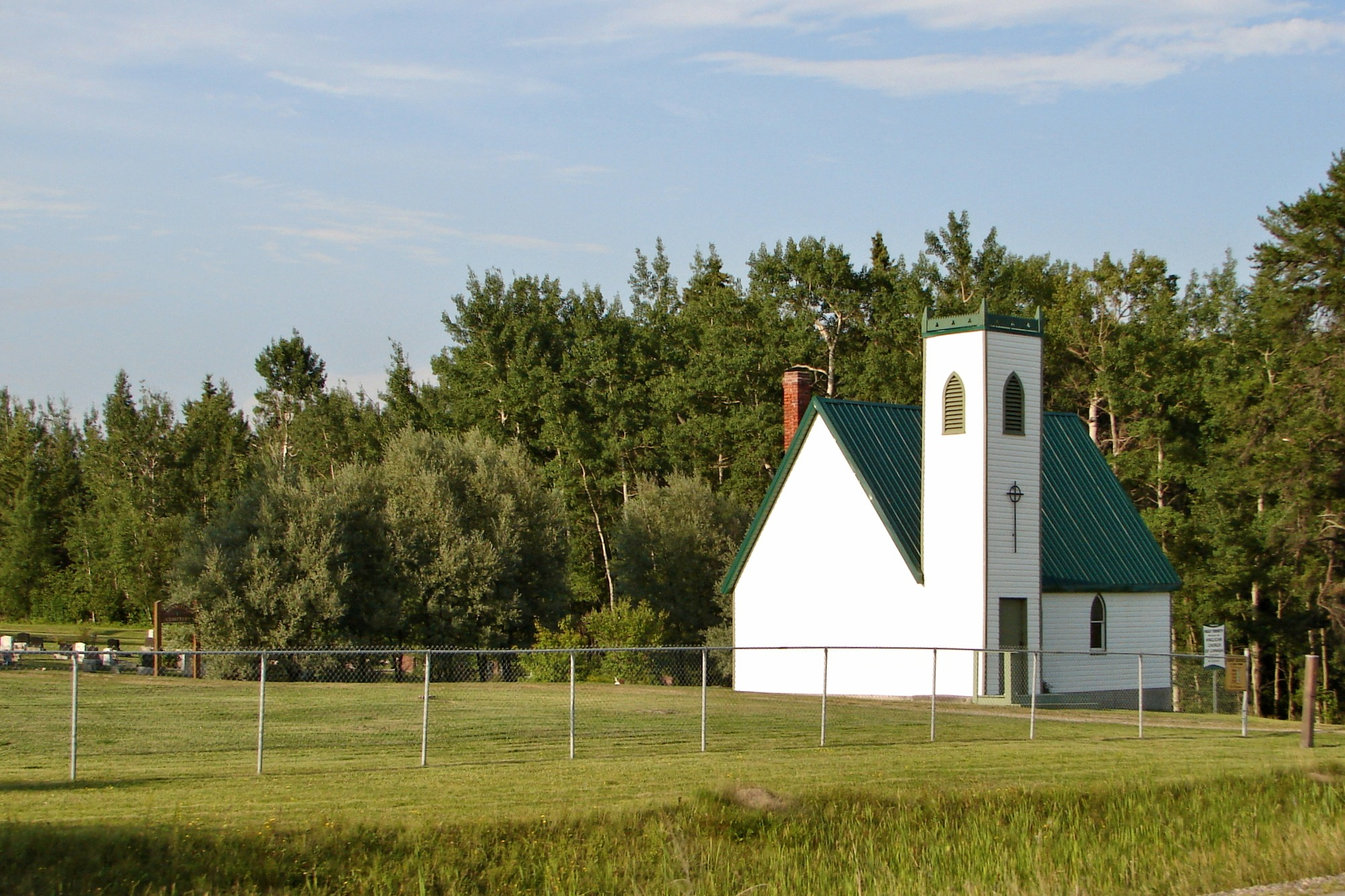
Minnitaki, Ontario

Minnitaki started as a railway point along the Canadian Pacific Railway, which was built in the early 1880s. Its indigenous name means "muddy waters" or "shaded waters", either referring to the murky waters of Beaver Creek that flows through the place or to the shadow cast on water by passing clouds.

In 1896, the geographic townships of Eton, Sanford, and Aubrey were surveyed, after which the first homesteaders founded the settlement.

== Demographics ==
In the 2021 Census of Population conducted by Statistics Canada, Machin had a population of 1,012 living in 457 of its 632 total private dwellings, a change of 4.2% from its 2016 population of 971. With a land area of 290.14 km^{2} (112.02 sq mi), it had a population density of 3.5/km^{2} (9.0/sq mi) in 2021.

Canada census – Machin community profile

	2021	2016	2011
Population	1,012 (+4.2% from 2016)	971 (+3.9% from 2011)	935 (-4.4% from 2006)
Land area	290.14 km^{2} (112.02 sq mi)	291.81 km^{2} (112.67 sq mi)	289.84 km^{2} (111.91 sq mi)
Population density	3.5/km^{2} (9.1/sq mi)	3.3/km^{2} (8.5/sq mi)	3.2/km^{2} (8.3/sq mi)
Median age	53.6 (M: 53.6, F: 52.8)	50.6 (M: 50.1, F: 50.9)	47.0 (M: 48.5, F: 46.0)
Private dwellings	632 (total) 457 (occupied)	597 (total)	560 (total)
Median household income	$77,500	$70,464

References: 2021 2016 2011

Historical census populations – Machin, Ontario

Year	Pop.	±%
1921	517	—
1931	694	+34.2%
1941	896	+29.1%
1951	928	+3.6%
1956	972	+4.7%
1961	1,119	+15.1%

Year	Pop.	±%
1966	1,106	−1.2%
1971	1,106	+0.0%
1976	1,189	+7.5%
1981	1,137	−4.4%
1986	1,152	+1.3%
1991	1,127	−2.2%

Year	Pop.	±%
1996	1,117	−0.9%
2001	1,143	+2.3%
2006	978	−14.4%
2011	935	−4.4%
2016	971	+3.9%
2021	1,012	+4.2%

Population counts are not adjusted for boundary changes.
Source: Statistics Canada

== See also ==
- List of townships in Ontario
