= Trans-Canada Highway =

Transcontinental highway system in Canada

Trans-Canada Highway
- Route Transcanadienne
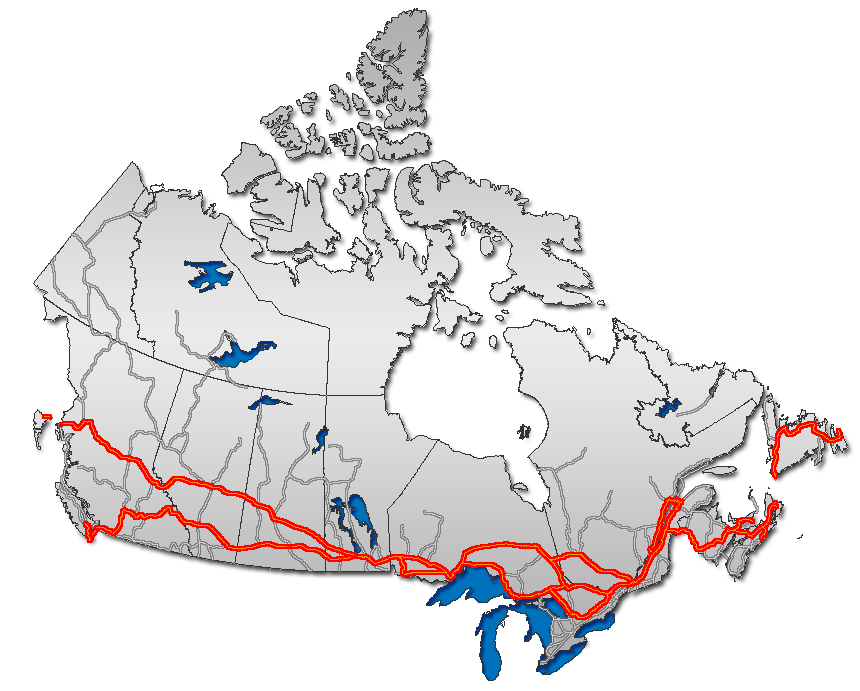
- A map showing the Trans-Canada Highway and forks

Route information
- Length: 7,476 km (4,645 mi) Main route
- Existed: July 30, 1962–present

Location
- Country: Canada
- Provinces: British Columbia, Alberta, Saskatchewan, Manitoba, Ontario, Quebec, New Brunswick, Nova Scotia, Newfoundland and Labrador

Highway system
- Trans-Canada Highway; National Highway System

The Trans-Canada Highway (French: Route Transcanadienne) is a transcontinental highway system within the country of Canada. The system traverses all ten provinces of Canada, and the main route travels 7,821 kilometres (4,860 mi) between Victoria, British Columbia, and St. John's, Newfoundland and Labrador, making it one of the longest routes of its type in the world.

Construction of the main route started in 1950 due to the signing of the Trans-Canada Highway Act. This act allowed federal and provincial governments to begin building sections of the highway. The highway was opened by Prime Minister John Diefenbaker in 1962; however, construction of the route was not completed until 1971. Since the opening of the main route, numerous other routes have been designated to the system, which connect to the main route at numerous points. The largest of these routes is the Yellowhead Highway from Haida Gwaii, British Columbia, to Portage La Prairie, Manitoba, which runs north of the main route. The entire system, including all routes, totals a distance of approximately 12,800 kilometres (8,000 mi).

The routes within the Trans-Canada Highway system are built to varying design standards. Although some portions are divided highways or freeways, the majority of the highway sections are two-lane, undivided highways, as the system was originally designed as such. The longest divided highway segment in the system runs approximately 1,500 kilometres (930 mi) from the Rocky Mountains to the Manitoba–Ontario provincial border. Although the network does not enter any of Canada's three northern territories or run to the United States border, it does form part of the country's National Highway System (NHS), whose other routes provide connections to the Northwest Territories, Yukon, and the border.

== Jurisdiction and designation ==
Examples of marker variations between provinces: British Columbia, Quebec, and Newfoundland and Labrador

Canada's National Highway System is not under federal jurisdiction or coordination, as highway construction and maintenance are entirely under the jurisdiction of the individual provinces, which also handle route numbering on the Trans-Canada Highway. The Western provinces have voluntarily coordinated their highway numbers so that the main Trans-Canada route is designated Highway 1 and the Yellowhead route is designated Highway 16 throughout. Prince Edward Island and Newfoundland and Labrador also designate Highway 1 as their section of the TCH, while New Brunswick uses Highway 2 (a separate important highway—albeit non-TCH—is Highway 1 in that province). East of Manitoba, the highway numbers change at each provincial boundary, or within a province (especially in Ontario and Quebec) as the TCH piggybacks along separate provincial highways (which often continue as non-TCH routes outside the designated sections) en route. In addition, Ontario and Quebec use standard provincial highway shields to number the highway within their boundaries, but post numberless Trans-Canada Highway shields alongside them to identify it. As the Trans-Canada route was composed of sections from pre-existing provincial highways, it is unlikely that the Trans-Canada Highway will ever have a uniform designation across the whole country.

== Main route ==
=== Western Canada ===
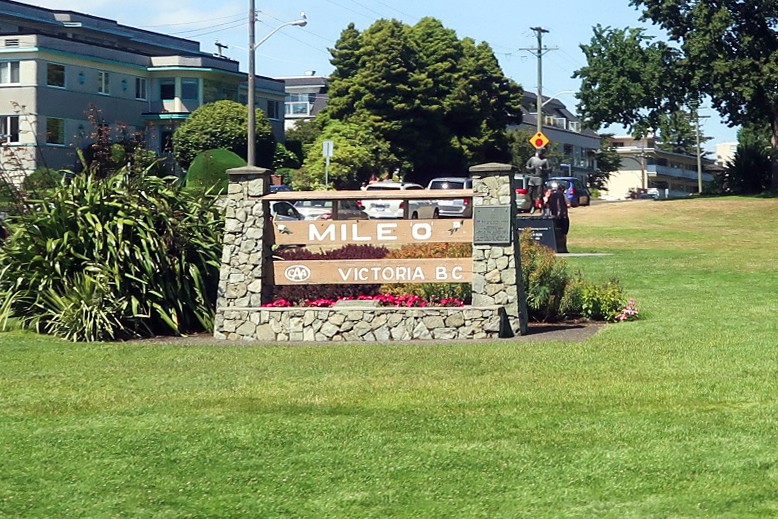
The Mile Zero monument signifying the end of the main route in Victoria, British Columbia

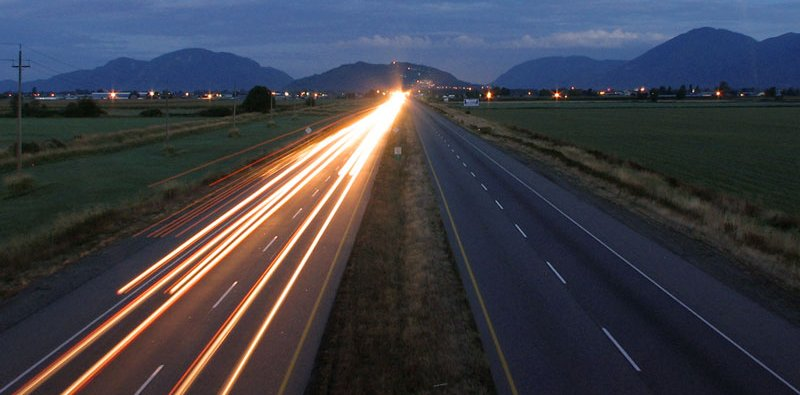
Highway 1 westbound near Vancouver

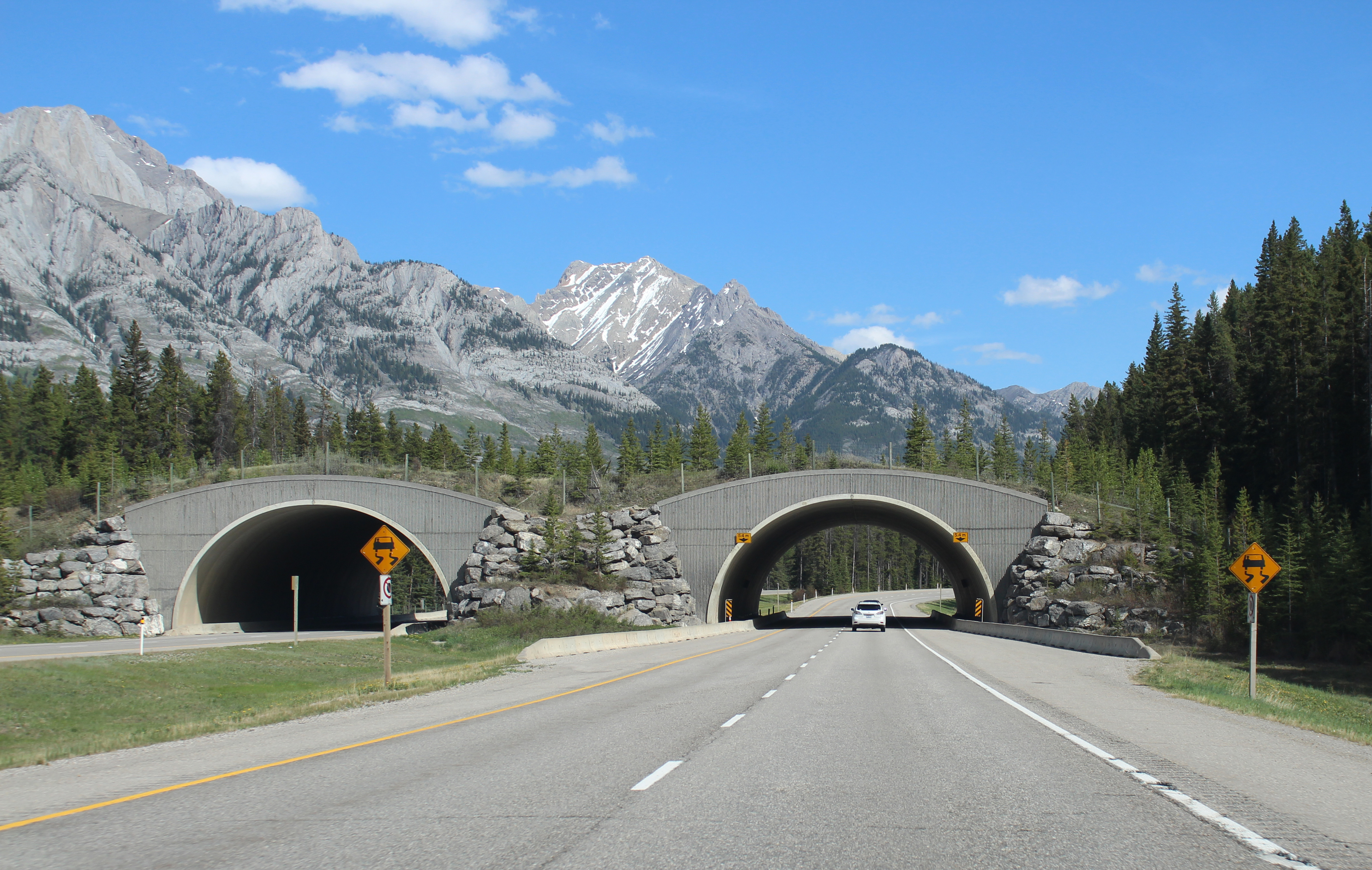
Highway 1 with wildlife overpass, eastbound through Banff National Park in Alberta

The main Trans-Canada Highway is uniformly designated as Highway 1 across British Columbia, Alberta, Saskatchewan, and Manitoba. The main route begins in Victoria near the "Mile 0" plaque. The highway starts by passing northward along the east coast of Vancouver Island to Nanaimo. After passing through downtown Nanaimo, the highway crosses the Strait of Georgia to Horseshoe Bay via BC Ferries. From there, it passes through the Vancouver area, before continuing eastward up the Fraser Valley to Hope. There, the route turns north to head through Fraser Canyon and Thompson Canyon toward Cache Creek. Approaching Kamloops, Highway 1 becomes concurrent with British Columbia Highways 5 and 97, before passing through the city itself. From Kamloops, the highway continues east and crosses two high passes along its route: Rogers Pass in Glacier National Park, and Kicking Horse Pass in Yoho National Park. At Kicking Horse Pass, the highest point on the whole Trans-Canada Highway system is reached, at 1,627 metres (5,338 ft). The high pass marks the boundary between British Columbia and Alberta (and also between Yoho and Banff National Parks), as well as the Continental Divide of the Americas.

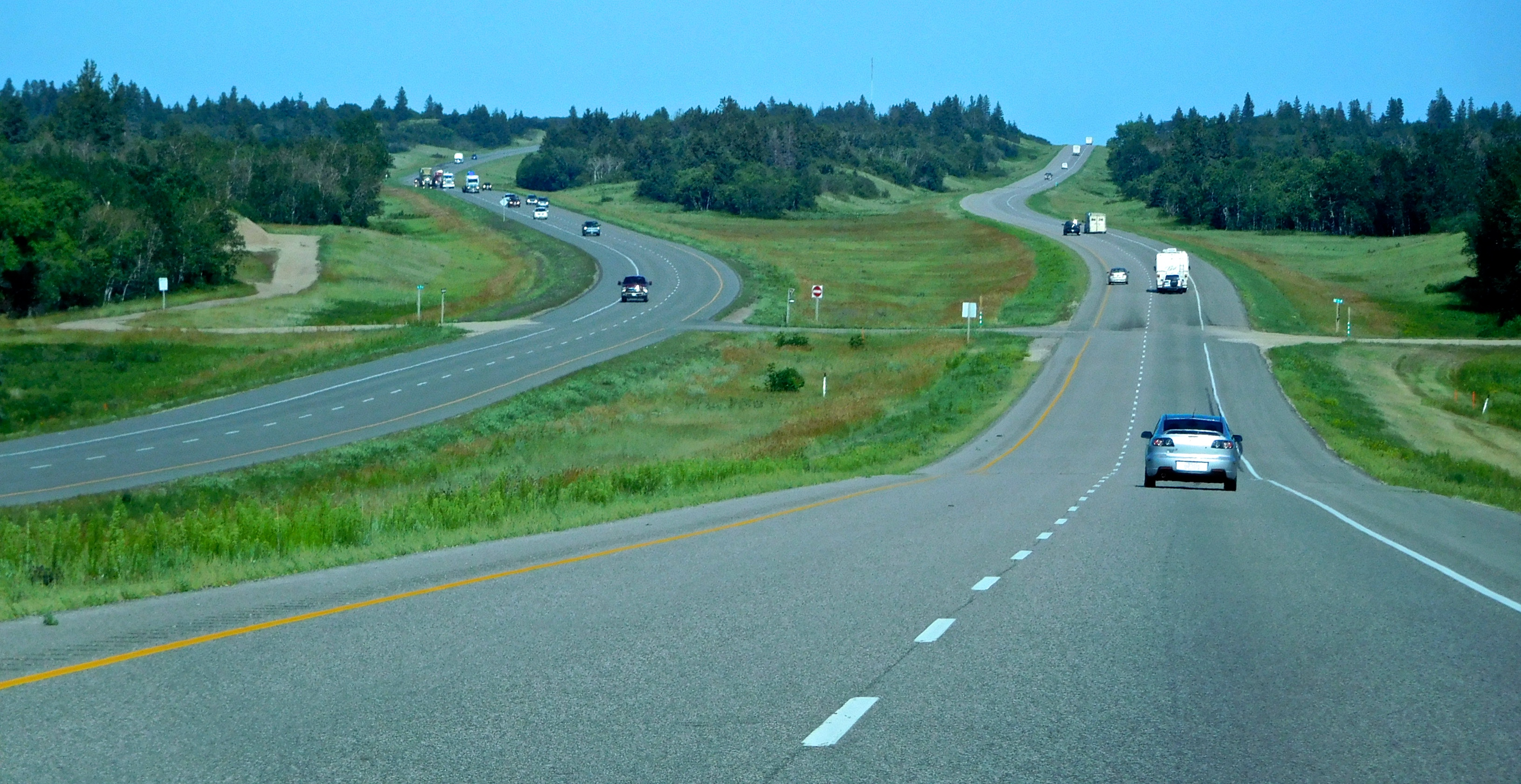
Highway 1 eastbound in Manitoba near Carberry

The highway continues through Alberta to Lake Louise, Banff, and Canmore. This section of the highway passes through Banff National Park. After leaving the mountains, it passes through Alberta's largest city, Calgary. The route continues to Medicine Hat, after which the Trans-Canada crosses into Saskatchewan. The highway continues east to Saskatchewan's capital, Regina, and skirts around the city on the Regina Bypass. Beyond Regina, it continues east across the border with Manitoba, to the cities of Brandon and Portage la Prairie, and Winnipeg. The southern portion of Winnipeg's Perimeter Highway (Highway 100) is part of the Trans-Canada Highway, and bypasses the city with a mix of traffic lights and interchanges, while Highway 1 continues through central Winnipeg. The "Highway 1" designation ends at the Manitoba–Ontario border, while the route continues east.

=== Ontario and Quebec ===
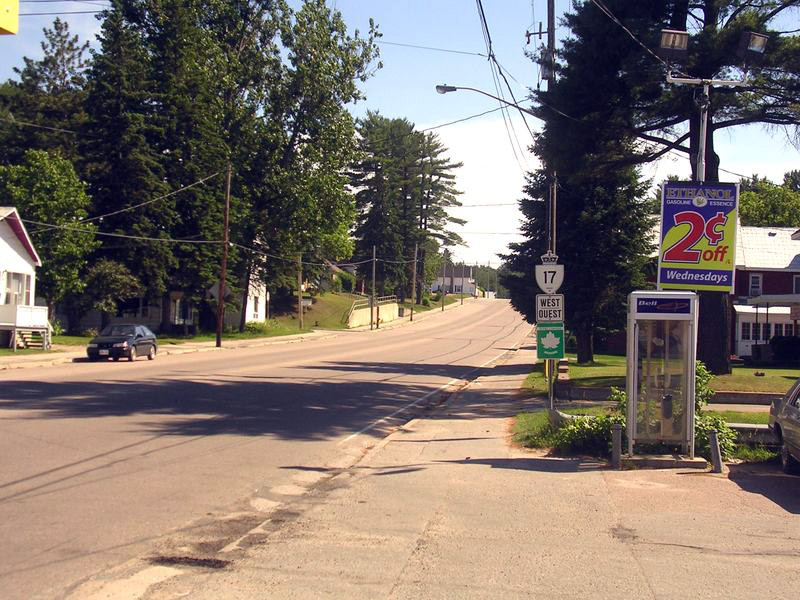
Highway 17 in Mattawa, Ontario.

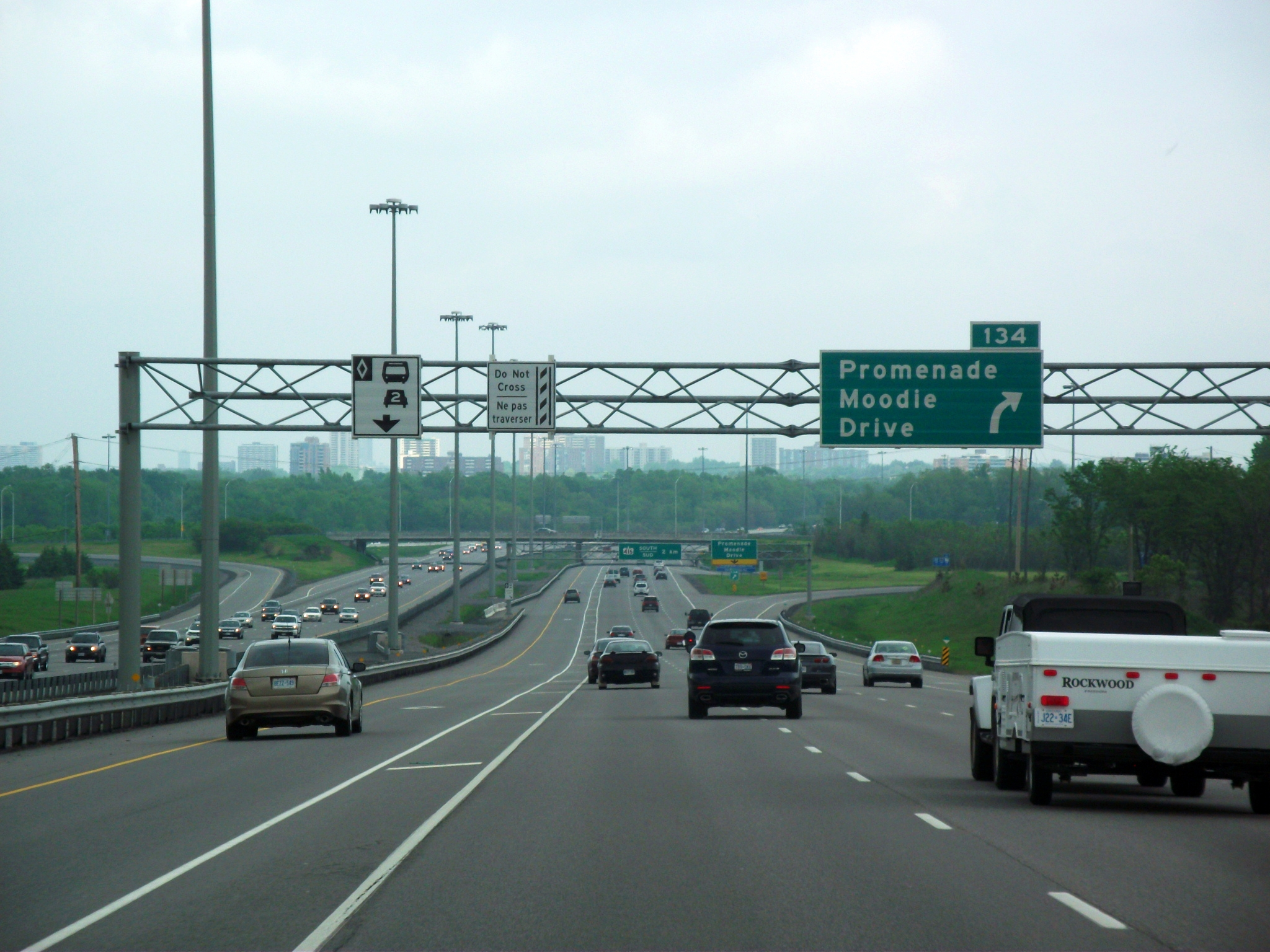
Trans-Canada Highway through Ottawa on Ontario Highway 417

East of Winnipeg, the highway continues to Ontario and the numeric designation of the highway changes to 17. It continues through Northern and Eastern Ontario, passing through Kenora. In Kenora, the Trans-Canada designation includes both the main route through the city's urban core and the Highway 17A bypass route to the north. The route continues east to Dryden; this section of highway passes through the Canadian Shield, a rugged, forested area with thousands of lakes.

Highway 11/Highway 17 proceeds southeast to Thunder Bay, then northeast to Nipigon. Highway 17 proceeds east from Nipigon along the northern and eastern coast of Lake Superior. At Sault Ste. Marie, the main route turns eastward to Sudbury.

The mainline route then continues east from Sudbury to North Bay. The northern route rejoins the mainline here, which continues to Arnprior, where it widens to a freeway and becomes Highway 417. The freeway continues to Ottawa, passing through the city on Highway 417.

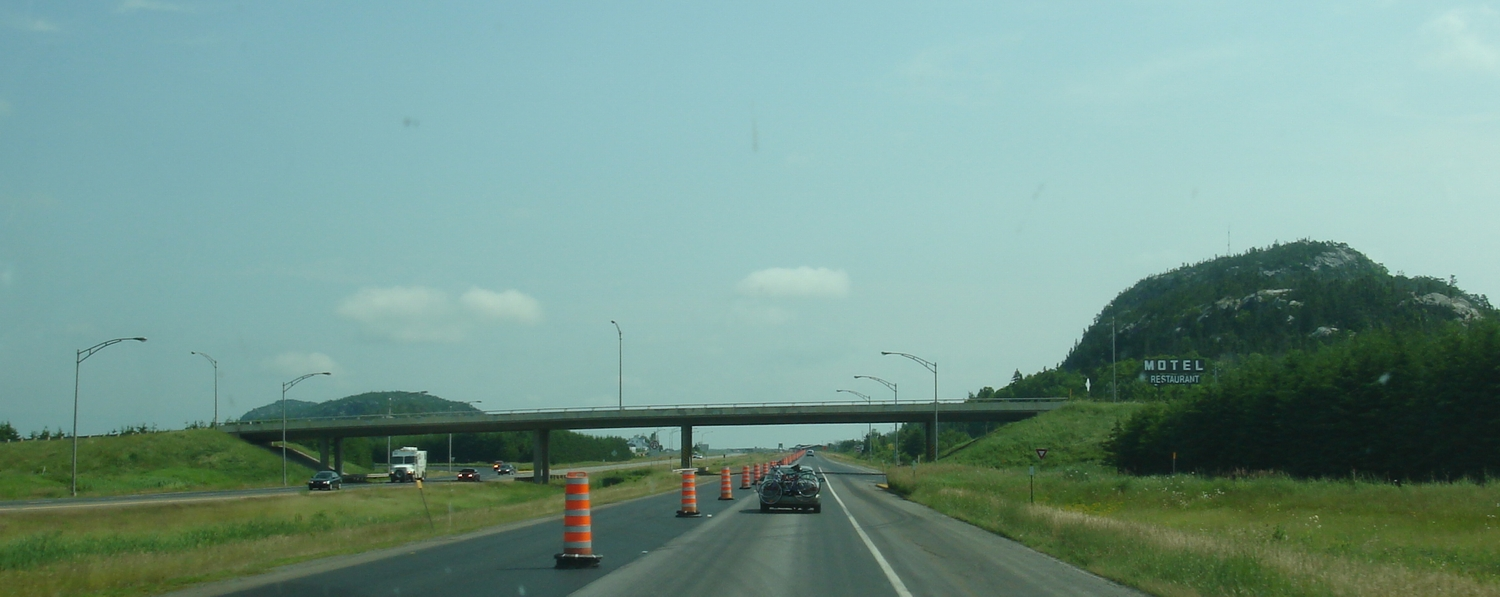
Quebec Autoroute 20 eastbound

From Ottawa, the highway continues as Autoroute 40 in Quebec. The route then follows Autoroute 25 southbound, crossing the St. Lawrence River through the Louis-Hippolyte Lafontaine Bridge–Tunnel, and proceeds northeast on Autoroute 20 to Lévis near Quebec City. East of Lévis, the Trans-Canada Highway continues on Autoroute 20 towards a junction near Rivière-du-Loup. At that junction, the highway turns southeast and changes designation to Autoroute 85, then continues on to the border with New Brunswick.

=== Atlantic provinces ===
The Trans-Canada Highway crosses into New Brunswick and becomes Route 2 just northwest of Edmundston. From Edmundston, the highway (again signed exclusively with the TCH shield) follows the Saint John River Valley, running south to Woodstock (parallelling the Canada–United States border) and then east for another 102 kilometres (63 mi) to pass through Fredericton and continues to Moncton. From Moncton, the highway continues to a junction at Aulac close to the New Brunswick–Nova Scotia border (near Sackville). Here, the Trans-Canada Highway again splits into two routes, with the main route continuing to the nearby border with Nova Scotia as Route 2, and a 70-kilometre (43 mi) route designated as Route 16, which runs east to the Confederation Bridge at Cape Jourimain.

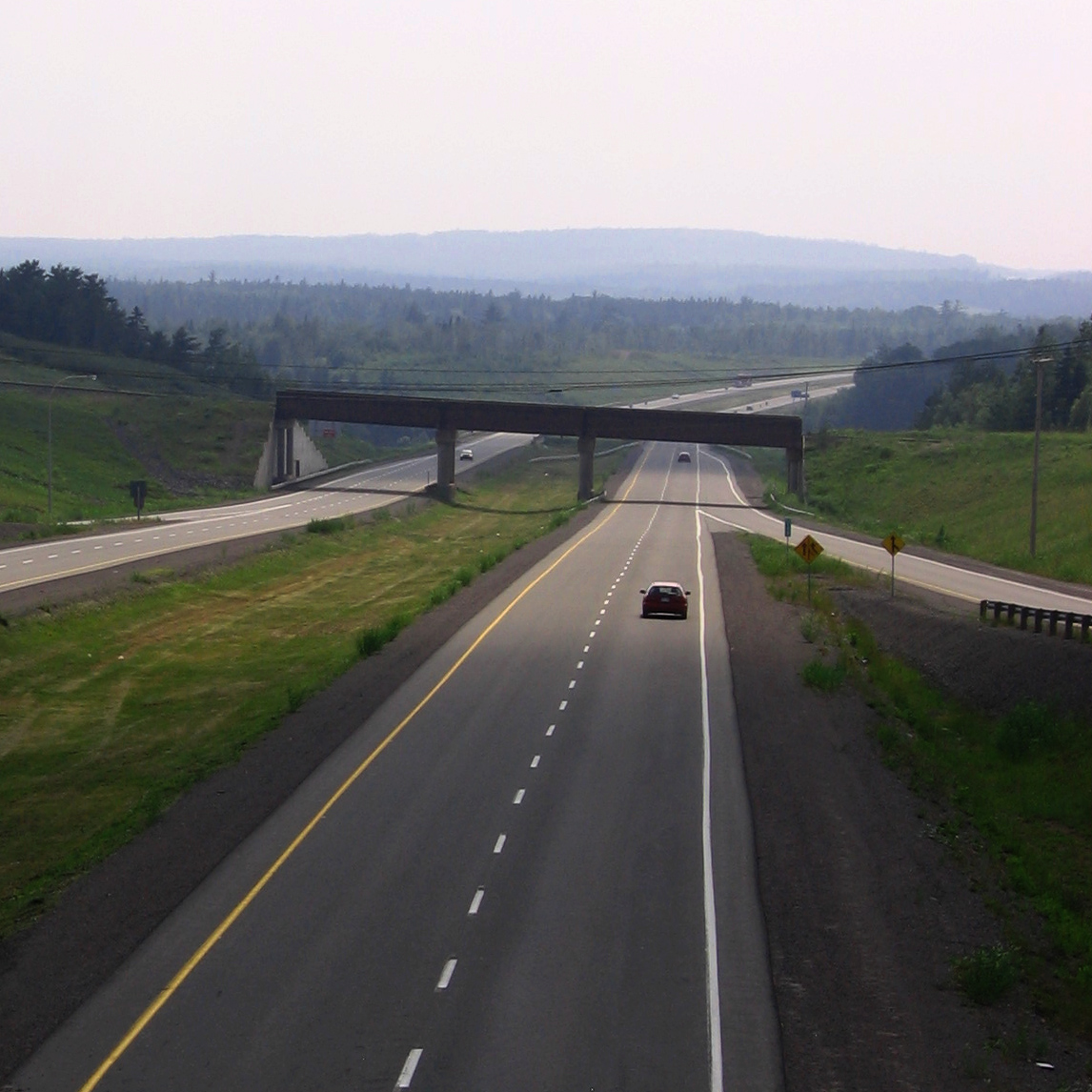
Highway 104 in Nova Scotia near Westville

From New Brunswick, the main Trans-Canada Highway route continues east into Nova Scotia as Nova Scotia Highway 104, passing the town of Amherst. Southeast of Amherst (near Thomson Station), the highway traverses the Cobequid Pass towards Truro, where it links with Highway 102 to Halifax. Beyond Truro, the highway continues east to New Glasgow, where it meets Highway 106; it then continues to the Canso Causeway, which crosses the Strait of Canso onto Cape Breton Island near Port Hawkesbury. From the Canso Causeway, the highway continues east, now designated as Highway 105 on Cape Breton Island, until reaching the Marine Atlantic ferry terminal at North Sydney.

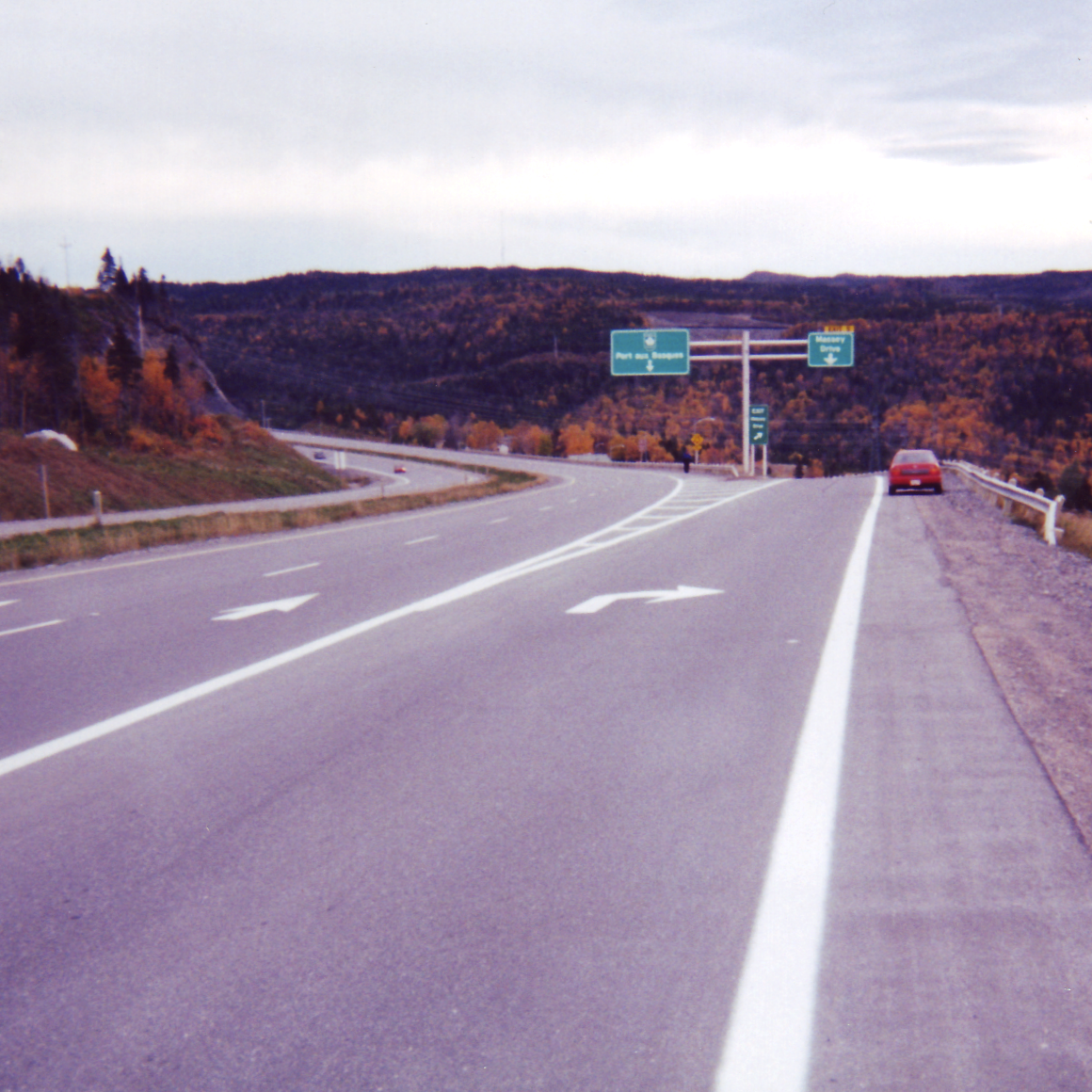
Route 1 in Newfoundland and Labrador near Corner Brook.

From North Sydney, a ferry route continues the highway to Newfoundland, arriving at Channel-Port aux Basques, whereby the Trans-Canada Highway assumes the designation of Highway 1. The highway runs northeast for 219 kilometres (136 mi) through Corner Brook, and travels east for another 352 kilometres (219 mi) through Gander. It then travels another 334 kilometres (208 mi) southeast, and then 52 kilometres (32 mi) northeast. Finally, the Trans-Canada Highway ends at St. John's. From Channel-Port aux Basques to its eastern terminus in the provincial capital city, the highway travels 905 kilometres (562 mi) in total, across the island. The eastern terminus of the highway is at an intersection with Outer Bay Road/White Hills Road and Logy Bay Road. The majority of the Trans-Canada Highway in Newfoundland is undivided, though sections in Corner Brook, Grand Falls-Windsor, Glovertown, and a 75-kilometre (47 mi) section from Whitbourne to St. John's are divided.

== Other routes ==
=== Highway 16 (Yellowhead Highway) ===
The Yellowhead Highway (YH) is a 2,859-kilometre (1,777 mi) highway in Western Canada, running from Masset, British Columbia, on Graham Island (in Haida Gwaii), east to where it intersects the main Trans-Canada Highway (PTH-1) just west of Portage la Prairie, Manitoba, near Winnipeg. It is designated as Highway 16 in all four provinces that it passes through (British Columbia, Alberta, Saskatchewan, and Manitoba). It follows a more northerly east–west route across Western Canada than the main TCH and passes through fewer cities. Other major municipalities on the route include Prince Rupert, Prince George, Edmonton, Lloydminster, Saskatoon, and Yorkton.

=== Northern Ontario and Quebec routes ===
The section of Highway 17 and Highway 11 between Kenora and North Bay, Ontario, is considered part of the Trans-Canada Highway. This highway first runs south of the main route between Kenora and Thunder Bay, passing through the town of Fort Frances on the U.S. border. Then, after running concurrently with the main Trans-Canada Highway route, Highway 11 splits off to the north at Nipigon, running through a vast and sparsely populated area of northern Ontario. A much shorter section of Highway 66 connects another northern Trans-Canada Highway route to Quebec Highway 117, which itself continues the TCH route to Montreal after connecting with Autoroute 15. The main Highway 11 continues south until it intersects the main Trans-Canada Highway route (Highway 17) in North Bay.

=== Central Ontario / Georgian Bay route ===
The southern Ontario Trans-Canada Highway route is even more abstract than the northern ones, as it uses four different provincial highways, and is largely non-functional as a major long distance corridor due to its roundabout route and the complete avoidance of the Toronto area. It is a 671-kilometre-long (417 mi) alternate route to Highway 17 (the mainline TCH) between Sudbury and Ottawa. It passes through several major communities, including Orillia and Peterborough. Because it passes closer to major population centres, this section of the TCH sees higher traffic volumes. It is made up of various sections of freeways, expressways, and two-lane routes.

=== Prince Edward Island route ===
Another spur route of the Trans-Canada Highway splits off the mainline in eastern New Brunswick. This route connects to Prince Edward Island across the 13-kilometre (8.1 mi) Confederation Bridge, crosses the central part of Prince Edward Island, including through the provincial capital of Charlottetown, before crossing back to the mainland on a ferry. This length of the route is 234 kilometres (145 mi), and consists of New Brunswick Highway 16, Prince Edward Island Highway 1, and Nova Scotia Highway 106. This leg of the Trans-Canada Highway sees moderately high traffic volumes and is an important tourist route. The Confederation Bridge is often viewed as an attraction in itself. Although the highway is mostly a two-lane route, portions of the route are built as two-lane expressways.

=== Bypasses ===
Two short bypasses are also considered part of the Trans-Canada Highway system. These include the 42-kilometre (26 mi) Perimeter Highway 100 bypass around Winnipeg, which provides an expressway standard alternative to the crowded Highway 1 in the city centre, and the 34-kilometre (21 mi) two-lane Kenora Bypass (Highway 17A), which is a two-lane route that bypasses the entire town to the north.

== History ==
=== Predecessor routes ===
Early on, much of the route of the Trans-Canada Highway was first explored in order to construct the Canadian Pacific Railway in the late 19th century, a route which much of the mainline TCH route later ended up following.

The Trans-Canada Highway was not the first road across Canada. In British Columbia, the highway was predated by the Crowsnest Highway, the Big Bend Highway, and the Cariboo Highway, all of which were constructed during the Great Depression era. Many of the earlier highways in British Columbia were largely gravel and had many frequent inland ferry crossings at wide rivers and lakes. In Alberta, the section between Calgary and Banff was predated by the Morley Trail (now Highway 1A), which was driveable starting in the 1910s and paved in the 1930s. The first route over the Central Canadian Rockies to connect Calgary to British Columbia was the Banff–Windermere Parkway, which was opened in 1922 and is now numbered as Highway 93. Sections of road across the Prairies have also existed since the 1920s. A gravel road connection across northern Ontario (Highway 17) was constructed starting in 1931. While this section was largely open by the late 1930s, it was not fully completed until 1951 (in large part due to World War II interrupting construction). However, despite the gap, vehicles could still cross the country by getting ferried around the relatively short section of incomplete highway by either rail or water, and Highway 11 was completed to Hearst from the east by 1937 and Nipigon by 1943.

=== Opening ===
The system was approved by the Trans-Canada Highway Act of 1949, with construction commencing in 1950. The highway officially opened in 1962, with the completion of the Rogers Pass section of highway between Golden and Revelstoke. This section of highway bypassed the original Big Bend Highway, the last remaining section of gravel highway on the route. Upon its original completion, the Trans-Canada Highway was the longest uninterrupted highway in the world. Construction on other legs continued until 1971, when the last gap on Highway 16 was completed in the Upper Fraser Valley east of Prince George, at which point the highway network was considered complete.

=== Since completion (1960–2000) ===
When the Trans-Canada Highway first opened, it was almost exclusively a two-lane route for its whole length across the country. While at the time it was considered a major improvement to the gravel roads and ferries it replaced, it was soon believed to be insufficient to handle the growing traffic volumes. In response, several provinces began to construct realignments, freeway widenings, and twin sections of highway in response to traffic flow and safety concerns.

In British Columbia, the Upper Levels Freeway alignment was opened in 1960 through Metro Vancouver with the completion of the Second Narrows Crossing, which allowed the TCH to bypass downtown Vancouver's streets and the narrow Lions Gate Bridge. The four-lane Upper Levels Freeway was constructed to a relatively low standard, with narrow lanes, low overpasses, and no proper merge ramps. It remains in this state in the present day. Between 1962 and 1964, Highway 1 was rerouted onto a new four-lane freeway bypass between Vancouver and Chilliwack. This section of highway was originally part of British Columbia's own 400 series of highways, until the designation was replaced by Highway 1. A freeway alignment on the Trans-Canada Highway between Chilliwack and Hope opened in 1986. The opening of the Cassiar Tunnel in 1990 bypassed the last sets of signal lights in Vancouver, rendering the whole alignment of the Trans-Canada Highway through the Lower Mainland a freeway. All bypassed sections of the highway were absorbed into various urban and rural road networks. The older freeways in the Lower Mainland were largely built as a parkway design, with wide, forested medians and low overpasses (a road configuration that was common across North America at the time). After the opening of the Coquihalla Highway in 1986, the Trans-Canada Highway through the Fraser Canyon received less traffic, because the freeway bypass shortened the drive between Hope and Kamloops by 90 minutes. However, the route was retained as part of the Trans-Canada Highway, and is considered a scenic route and a valuable part of the Fraser Country Circle Tour. The opening of the Coquihalla was also an economic disaster for many of the towns along the Fraser Canyon section of the Trans-Canada Highway, since most of the travel and tourism business along the route quickly dried up when most of the traffic took the new highway. The towns continue to be largely deprived of wealth, and some are close to being abandoned. On the other hand, Merritt, located midway up the new Coquihalla highway, ended up booming, and continues to grow as a tourism and travel centre. The Coquihalla project also realigned Highway 1 (TCH) to a new freeway bypass around Kamloops. Plans for a freeway to bypass or eliminate traffic congestion and road hazards along the heavily travelled route from Victoria to Nanaimo on Vancouver Island were cancelled during the recession that followed the 1987 stock market crash.

In Alberta, between 1964 and 1972, the Trans-Canada Highway was completely rerouted from its former two-lane alignment along the Bow River to a new, more direct, four-lane freeway between Banff and Calgary, resulting in the bypassing of several towns, such as Canmore and Cochrane. Prior to this change, one of the first traffic circles in Canada existed on Highway 1 at the "gateway" junction for Banff from at least as early as the 1950s until about 1980 when it was replaced by an interchange. In the rest of Banff National Park, much of the predecessor Highway 1 parkway was bypassed by a new two-lane route in the 1960s. This new route was subsequently twinned in phases beginning in about 1980. The original route between Banff and Lake Louise remains as the Bow Valley Parkway and Lake Louise Drive, while a section over Kicking Horse Pass was abandoned and is now only open to pedestrians and cyclists. Between 1973 and 1990, the highway was twinned from Calgary to the Saskatchewan Border. In 1970, plans were made for a six-to-eight-lane freeway to carry the Trans-Canada Highway though the heart of North Calgary, but the plan was soon dropped due to citizen outcry.

Between Ottawa and the Ontario–Quebec border, the Trans-Canada Highway designation was taken from the two-lane Highway 17 and applied to the existing Highway 417 freeway in 1997–98. On April 1, 1997, the Ministry of Transportation of Ontario (MTO) transferred the responsibility of maintenance and upkeep along 14.2 kilometres (8.8 mi) of Highway 17 east of "the split" with Highway 417 to Trim Road (Regional Road 57) to the Regional Municipality of Ottawa-Carleton, a process commonly referred to as downloading. The Regional Municipality then designated the road as Regional Road 174. Despite the protests of the region that the route served a provincial purpose, a second round of transfers saw Highway 17 within Ottawa downloaded entirely on January 1, 1998, adding an additional 12.8 kilometres (8.0 mi) to the length of Regional Road 174. The highway was also downloaded within the United Counties of Prescott and Russell, where it was redesignated as County Road 17. The result of these transfers was the truncation of Highway 17 at the western end of Highway 417. 1990 saw the opening of the two-lane Kenora Bypass, providing through traffic with a way to avoid the congested town.

Starting in the 1960s, Quebec began to build its Autoroute network. Many sections of Trans-Canada Highway were widened to freeway standards during that era of highway construction.

Starting in 1987, New Brunswick began to widen its section of TCH to four lanes. Work to make the route a full freeway began in the late 1990s and was completed in 2007.

The 13-kilometre (8.1 mi) Confederation Bridge connecting PEI to New Brunswick opened in 1997. Replacing the ferry that previously serviced that route, it was hailed as a major accomplishment.

=== Changes 2000–present ===
In 2000 and 2001, Transport Canada considered funding an infrastructure project to have the full Trans-Canada system converted to limited-access divided highways. Although construction funding was made available to some provinces for portions of the system, the federal government ultimately decided to not pursue a comprehensive limited-access highway conversion. Opposition to funding the limited-access widening was due to low traffic levels on parts of the Trans-Canada Highway.

Prior to the start of the Great Recession in 2008, the highway underwent some changes through the Rocky Mountains from Banff National Park to Golden, British Columbia. A major piece of this project was completed on August 30, 2007, with the new Park Bridge and Ten Mile Hill sections opening 16 kilometres (9.9 mi) of new four-lane highway. Other smaller four-lane widening projects on the Trans-Canada Highway in the interior of British Columbia were also built around the same time. As part of the Gateway Program, 37 kilometres (23 mi) of congested four-lane Highway 1 freeway in Metro Vancouver were widened to eight lanes starting in 2012. This project continues into the present, with the current goal of rebuilding the freeway to a minimum of six lanes from Langley to Abbotsford by 2025.

The twinning of the highway in Alberta's Banff National Park continued, with the final 8.5 kilometres (5.3 mi) of Highway 1 between Lake Louise and the British Columbia border opened to traffic on June 12, 2014, making the whole length of Alberta's main Trans-Canada Highway route a minimum four lanes. Stoney Trail began construction in 2005, and was usable as a bypass around Calgary when its northeastern section opened in 2010. Although not part of the Trans-Canada Highway system, Stoney Trail plays a critical role in providing through traffic on the Trans-Canada Highway with a way around the city.

During the 2000s, much of the Trans-Canada Highway through Saskatchewan and Manitoba was twinned. In 2019, the Regina Bypass opened, resulting in the Trans-Canada Highway being realigned around the city and bypassing a section of heavily signalized arterial road on Victoria Avenue.

The 2010s saw changes to other routes in the Trans-Canada Highway system as well. Ontario Highway 400 began to be extended towards Sudbury, replacing Highway 69 and resulting in a freeway alignment for part of the Southern Ontario Trans-Canada Highway Route. Work on this project is continuing, with almost 25 kilometres (16 mi) of freeway currently under construction.

In 2019 Edmonton began widening its urban section of Highway 16 to a six-lane freeway. Large amounts of Highway 16 in Alberta were twinned during the 2000s.

Despite these many widenings, over half of the mainline Trans-Canada Highway still remains in its original two-lane state, and only about 15% of the mainline's length is composed of freeway comparable to that of the US Interstate Highway System.

In 2012, a series of free public electric vehicle charging stations were installed along the main route of the highway by a private company, Sun Country Highway, permitting electric vehicle travel across the entire length, as demonstrated by the company's president, Kent Rathwell, in a publicity trip from St. John's to Victoria in a Tesla Roadster. As of 2012, this made the TCH the longest electric-vehicle-ready highway in the world.

In October 2026, Quebec completed work on Autoroute 85, bringing the last two-lane section of the mainline highway in Quebec up to four-lane freeway standards.

== Future ==
No national plan for widening the Trans-Canada Highway exists, and all planning is currently done by the individual provinces, as the Trans-Canada Highway and highways within National Highway System fall within provincial/territorial jurisdiction, with provincial/territorial governments responsible for planning, design, construction, operation, maintenance, and financing. However, the federal government may contribute funding to highway projects through its various funding programs. Currently, there are five large-scale highway projects on the Trans-Canada Highway Network.

In Ontario, the province has several significant highway expansion projects on the Trans-Canada Highway planned or under way:

- Between Parry Sound and Sudbury, construction to upgrade Highway 69 from a two-lane highway to a 400-series freeway has been underway for decades, with the most recently completed section of freeway officially opened in December 2021, leaving 68 kilometres (42 mi) to be completed.
- Between Arnprior and Renfrew, the province announced in 2019 the upgrading of an additional 22.5 kilometres (14.0 mi) of two-lane Highway 17 to a 400-series freeway. The announcement did not specify costs or timelines, but a new overpass at Calabogie Road opened in August 2023.
- Between Thunder Bay and Nipigon, construction to make Highway 11/17 a four-lane, divided highway (with at-grade intersections) started in the late 2000s, with completion expected by 2030. The most recent section through Dorion was opened in the summer of 2023, with other sections under design or construction.
- Between Kenora and the Manitoba border, construction to make Highway 17 a four-lane divided highway started in 2022, with a 6.5-kilometre (4.0 mi) section slated for completion by 2025 and the remaining sections still under design.

In Manitoba in May 2023, the province announced the launch of a conceptual design study for the twinning of the remaining 16-kilometre (9.9 mi) two-lane section of Highway 1 west of the Ontario border, plus the immediate construction of a 700-metre (2,300 ft) section to align with four-laning work in Ontario.

As of September 2021, British Columbia was planning on widening the 420-kilometre (260 mi) long section of TCH between Kamloops and Alberta to four lanes by 2050. The project goals do not include an eventual freeway conversion, and it is likely that the signalized sections of highway in Kamloops, Salmon Arm, Revelstoke, and Golden will remain. Around 16 kilometres (9.9 mi) of four-lane highway were under construction, with 6 kilometres (3.7 mi) of the highway more planned to start in 2022. Around a quarter of the length of highway between Kamloops and Alberta is now four lanes wide. At the current rate of construction, the project will likely not be completed until the 2070s. However, some of the most difficult sections have been completed, meaning that it may be easier to widen the remaining sections of highway to four lanes. Some of the highway in this section is under the jurisdiction of Parks Canada, specifically the sections through Mount Revelstoke, Glacier, and Yoho National Parks, which means that Parks Canada will have to implement its own four-lane program in order for the provincial government to accomplish its goal.

The City of Edmonton is changing its urban section of Highway 16 (TCH) to a six-lane freeway by replacing all signal lights with overpasses. The route is already largely a freeway, but seven signalized intersections remain. The project is expected to be finished by 2026.

As of September 2021, British Columbia was planning on widening 36 kilometres (22 mi) of Highway 1 in the Lower Mainland as part of its Fraser Valley Highway program. The four-lane freeway is over-congested, and many of the overpasses are in poor shape. The project intends to rebuild most of the interchanges and overpasses and widen the highway to six lanes. The first four kilometres (2.5 mi) of this project opened in 2020, with ten kilometres (6.2 mi) more expected to be complete in 2025.

Apart from the major programs, many smaller-scale projects exist on the highway in order to rehabilitate the aging infrastructure or make minor traffic changes.

Alberta had long term plans to convert both of its Trans-Canada Highway routes to a minimum four-lane freeway standard, but has not set a timeline for doing so.

== Bicycling ==
Most of the Trans-Canada Highway (except a few sections of exceptionally heavy motorized traffic) is a popular bike tour route.

== See also ==
- Canadian (train)
- List of Canadian highways by province
- Trans-Canada Trail
