= Unorganized Kenora District =

- Unorganized area
- Kenora, Unorganized
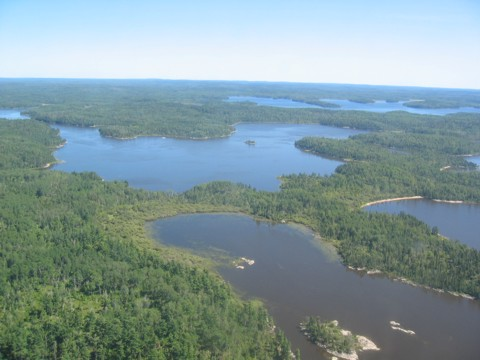
- Scenery near Minaki

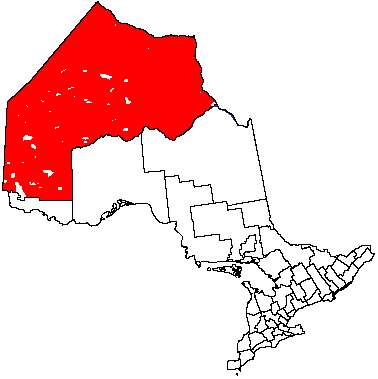
- Coordinates: 53°00′N 89°00′W
- Country: Canada
- Province: Ontario
- District: Kenora

Government
  - Fed. riding: Kapuskasing—Timmins—Mushkegowuk, Kenora—Kiiwetinoong, Thunder Bay—Superior North
  - Prov. riding: Kenora—Rainy River, Kiiwetinoong, Mushkegowuk—James Bay

Area
  - Land: 388,982.20 km^{2} (150,186.87 sq mi)

Population (2021)
  - Total: 7,475
  - Density: 0/km^{2} (0/sq mi)
- Time zones: UTC-5 (EST)
  - Summer (DST): UTC-4 (EDT)
- UTC-6 (CST)
  - Summer (DST): UTC-5 (CDT)
- Postal code FSA: P
- Area codes: 705, 807

Unorganized Kenora District is an unorganized area in northwestern Ontario, Canada, in Kenora District. Constituting 98.39 percent of the district's land area, yet only 10.93 percent of its population, it is essentially the remainder of the district's territory after all incorporated cities, municipalities, townships, Indian reserves, and Indian settlements have been excluded. It is by far the largest municipal-equivalent level census division in Ontario, covering over 35 percent of the entire provincial land area, yet only about 0.05 percent of the population of Ontario.

The unorganized area is gradually being reduced in size as adjacent municipalities annex portions of the unorganized area or new municipalities are formed. Balmertown, Barclay (now part of Dryden) and Ear Falls Improvement Districts were incorporated in 1950, 1963, and 1970 respectively, and in 1969, Sioux Lookout (formed in 1944 as an Improvement District) annexed portions of unorganized territory. Between the 2001 and 2021 censuses, its area shrank from 401,003.37 square kilometres (154,828.27 sq mi) to 388,982.2 square kilometres (150,186.9 sq mi),

== Local services boards ==
- Greater Oxdrift
- Melgund
- Minaki
- Red Lake Road
- Redditt
- Round Lake
- Wabigoon

== Demographics ==
Canada census – Kenora, Unorganized community profile

	2021	2016	2011
Population	7475 (+11.7% from 2016)	6737 (-4.2% from 2011)	7031 (-0.1% from 2006)
Land area	388,982.2 km^{2} (150,186.9 sq mi)	400,813.46 km^{2} (154,754.94 sq mi)	400,771.81 km^{2} (154,738.86 sq mi)
Population density	0.0/km^{2} (0/sq mi)	0.0/km^{2} (0/sq mi)	0.0/km^{2} (0/sq mi)
Median age	54.8 (M: 54.8, F: 54.8)	52.7 (M: 53.5, F: 51.6)
Private dwellings	7,310 (total) 3,272 (occupied)	6,630 (total) 2,824 (occupied)	7394 (total)
Median household income	$86,000	$78,196

References: 2021 2016 2011

Historical census populations – Kenora, Unorganized

Year	Pop.	±%
1976	11,126	—
1981	9,750	−12.4%
1986	9,258	−5.0%
1991	9,723	+5.0%
1996	10,269	+5.6%

Year	Pop.	±%
2001	7,631	−25.7%
2006	7,041	−7.7%
2011	7,031	−0.1%
2016	6,737	−4.2%
2021	7,475	+11.0%

Population counts are not adjusted for boundary changes.
Source: Statistics Canada

== See also ==
- List of townships in Ontario
- Sand Point Lake, Ontario
