= 2014 Sudbury District municipal elections =

Elections were held in the organized municipalities in the Sudbury District of Ontario on October 27, 2014, in conjunction with municipal elections across the province.

== Baldwin ==
Reeve Candidate	Vote	%
Vern Gorham	179	69.11
Archie Boivin (X)	80	30.89

== Chapleau ==
Mayoral Candidate	Vote	%
Michael J. Levesque	557	53.30
Ryan Bignucolo	439	42.01
Thomas Prue	49	4.69

== Espanola ==
Mayoral Candidate	Vote	%
Ron Piche	1,187	48.77
Jill Beer	1,015	41.70
Jeff Lapierre	232	9.53

== French River ==
Mayoral Candidate	Vote	%
Claude Bouffard (X)	1,301	54.39
Malcolm Lamothe	1,091	45.61

== Killarney ==
Mayoral Candidate	Vote	%
Ginny Rook	443	55.31
Geoff Cosh	358	44.69

== Markstay-Warren ==
Mayoral Candidate	Vote	%
Stephen Salonin	633	54.95
Sonja Flynn (X)	519	45.05

== Nairn and Hyman ==
Mayoral Candidate	Vote	%
Laurier P. Falldien (X)	150	73.53
Seppo Vataja	54	26.47

== Sables-Spanish Rivers ==
Mayoral Candidate	Vote	%
Leslie Gamble (X)	Acclaimed	

== St. Charles ==
Mayoral Candidate	Vote	%
Paul Schoppmann (X)	766	88.55
Hank Allen	60	6.94
Carol Austin	39	4.51
