= Wolseley River =

River in Canada

- Location of the mouth of the Wolseley River in Ontario

Location
- Country: Canada
- Province: Ontario
- Region: Northeastern Ontario
- Districts: Nipissing; Sudbury

Physical characteristics
- Source: Unnamed lake
  - location: Servos Township, Sudbury District
  - coordinates: 46°13′59″N 80°42′55″W
  - elevation: 219 m (719 ft)
- Mouth: French River
  - location: West Nipissing, Nipissing District
  - coordinates: 46°06′22″N 80°15′55″W
  - elevation: 189 m (620 ft)

Basin features
- River system: Lake Huron drainage basin
- Tributaries
  - right: Wolf River

The Wolseley River is a river in Sudbury District and Nipissing District in Northeastern Ontario, Canada. The river begins at an unnamed lake in geographic Servos Township in the Unorganized North Part of Sudbury District, passes through the municipality of French River, then flows about 4 kilometres (2 mi) through the municipality of West Nipissing in Nipissing District to Wolseley Bay on the French River adjacent to the community of Wolseley Bay (also part of the municipality of French River, Sudbury District).

== Tributaries ==
- Wolf River (right)

== See also ==
- List of rivers of Ontario

== Sources ==
- Map 8 (PDF) (Map). 1 : 700,000. Official road map of Ontario. Ministry of Transportation of Ontario. 2010-01-01.
- Restructured municipalities - Ontario map #4 (Map). Restructuring Maps of Ontario. Ontario Ministry of Municipal Affairs and Housing. 2006. Archived from the original on 2014-04-10.
