= List of secondary highways in Nipissing District =

List of Ontario secondary highways

This is a list of secondary highways in Nipissing District, many of which serve as logging roads or provide access to Algonquin Park and sparsely populated areas in the Nipissing District of northeastern Ontario.

== Highway 523 ==
Highway 523

Route information
- Maintained by the Ministry of Transportation of Ontario
- Length: 20.1 km (12.5 mi)

Major junctions
- South end: Nipissing–Hastings boundary
- North end: Highway 60 – Madawaska

Location
- Country: Canada
- Province: Ontario
- Districts: Nipissing

Highway system
- Ontario provincial highways; Current; Former; 400-series
| ← Highway 522B | → Highway 524 |

Secondary Highway 523, commonly referred to as Highway 523, is a provincially maintained highway in the Canadian province of Ontario. The highway is a 20.1-kilometre (12.5 mi) north–south route in Nipissing District which follows the historic Madawaska Colonization Road. The highway begins at the Nipissing-Hastings boundary, where it continues south to Highway 127. It ends at Highway 60 in the village of Madawaska.

== Highway 531 ==
Highway 531

Route information
- Maintained by Ministry of Transportation of Ontario
- Length: 3.5 km (2.2 mi)
- Existed: 1956–present

Major junctions
- South end: Maple Road in Bonfield
- North end: Highway 17 – Ottawa

Location
- Country: Canada
- Province: Ontario
- Divisions: Nipissing District
- Villages: Bonfield

Highway system
- Ontario provincial highways; Current; Former; 400-series
| ← Highway 529A | → Highway 532 |

Secondary Highway 531, commonly referred to as Highway 531, is a provincially maintained secondary highway in the Canadian province of Ontario. It connects Highway 17 east of North Bay with the community of Bonfield. The 3.5-kilometre (2.2 mi) route was established in 1956, and has remained the same since then. It passes through a forested area and has several private residences located along its length. Aside from Maple Road, its southern terminus, and Highway 17, its northern terminus, Highway 531 encounters no roads along its length.

== Highway 533 ==
Highway 533

Route information
- Maintained by Ministry of Transportation of Ontario
- Length: 53.4 km (33.2 mi)
- Existed: 1956–present

Major junctions
- South end: Highway 17 in Mattawa
- Highway 656
- North end: Highway 63 near Eldee

Location
- Country: Canada
- Province: Ontario
- Divisions: Nipissing District
- Towns: Mattawa

Highway system
- Ontario provincial highways; Current; Former; 400-series
| ← Highway 532 | → Highway 534 |

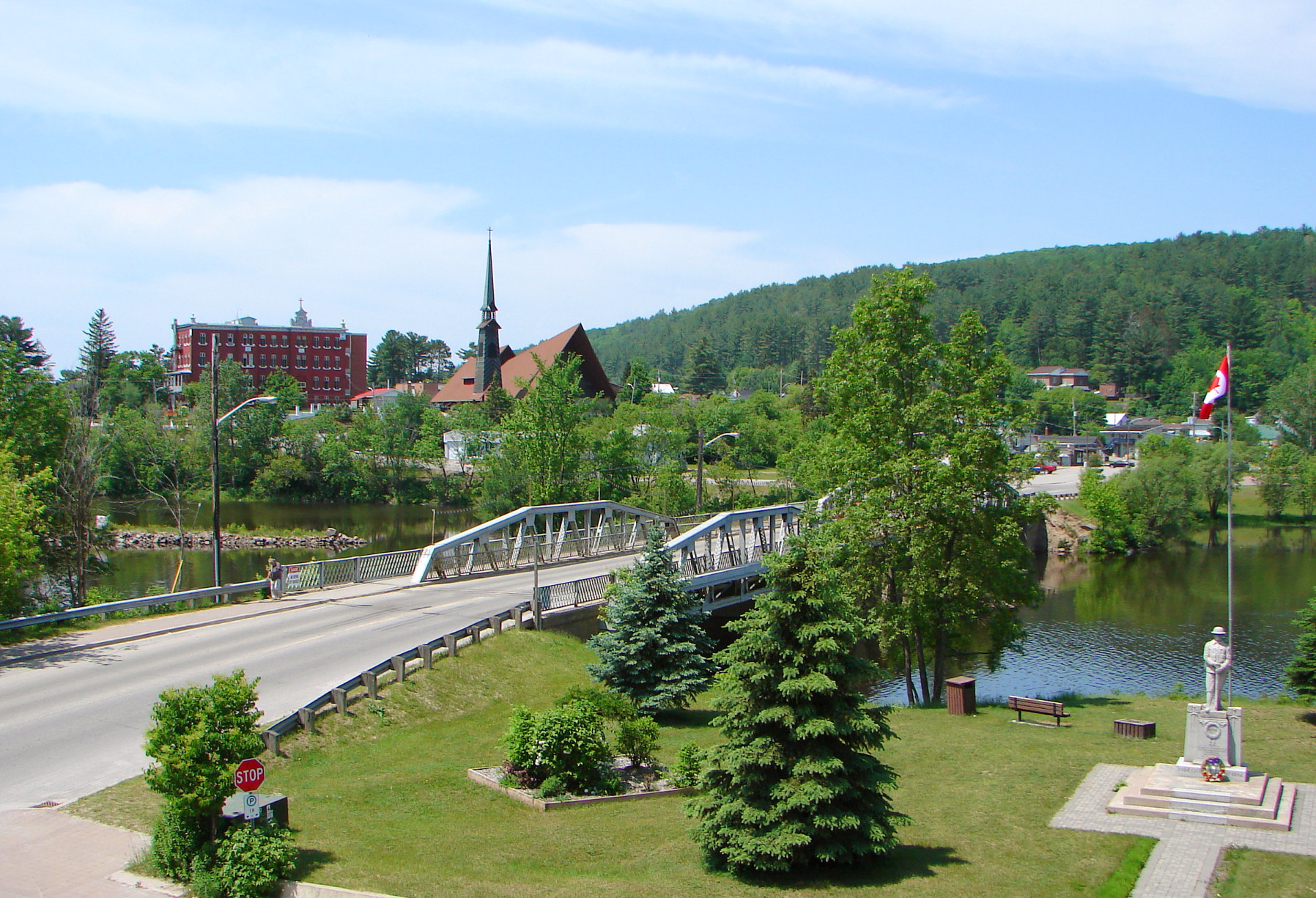
Highway 533 through Mattawa

Secondary Highway 533, commonly referred to as Highway 533, is a provincially maintained secondary highway in the Canadian province of Ontario. The route begins in the town of Mattawa, at Highway 17, and travels north to Highway 63.

== Highway 539 ==
Highway 539

Route information
- Maintained by the Ministry of Transportation of Ontario
- Length: 36.9 km (22.9 mi)

Major junctions
- Southwest end: Highway 17 in Warren
- Highway 539A in River Valley
- Northeast end: Highway 64 in Field

Location
- Country: Canada
- Province: Ontario
- Divisions: Sudbury District, Nipissing District
- Major cities: Markstay-Warren, West Nipissing

Highway system
- Ontario provincial highways; Current; Former; 400-series
| ← Highway 538 | → Highway 539A |

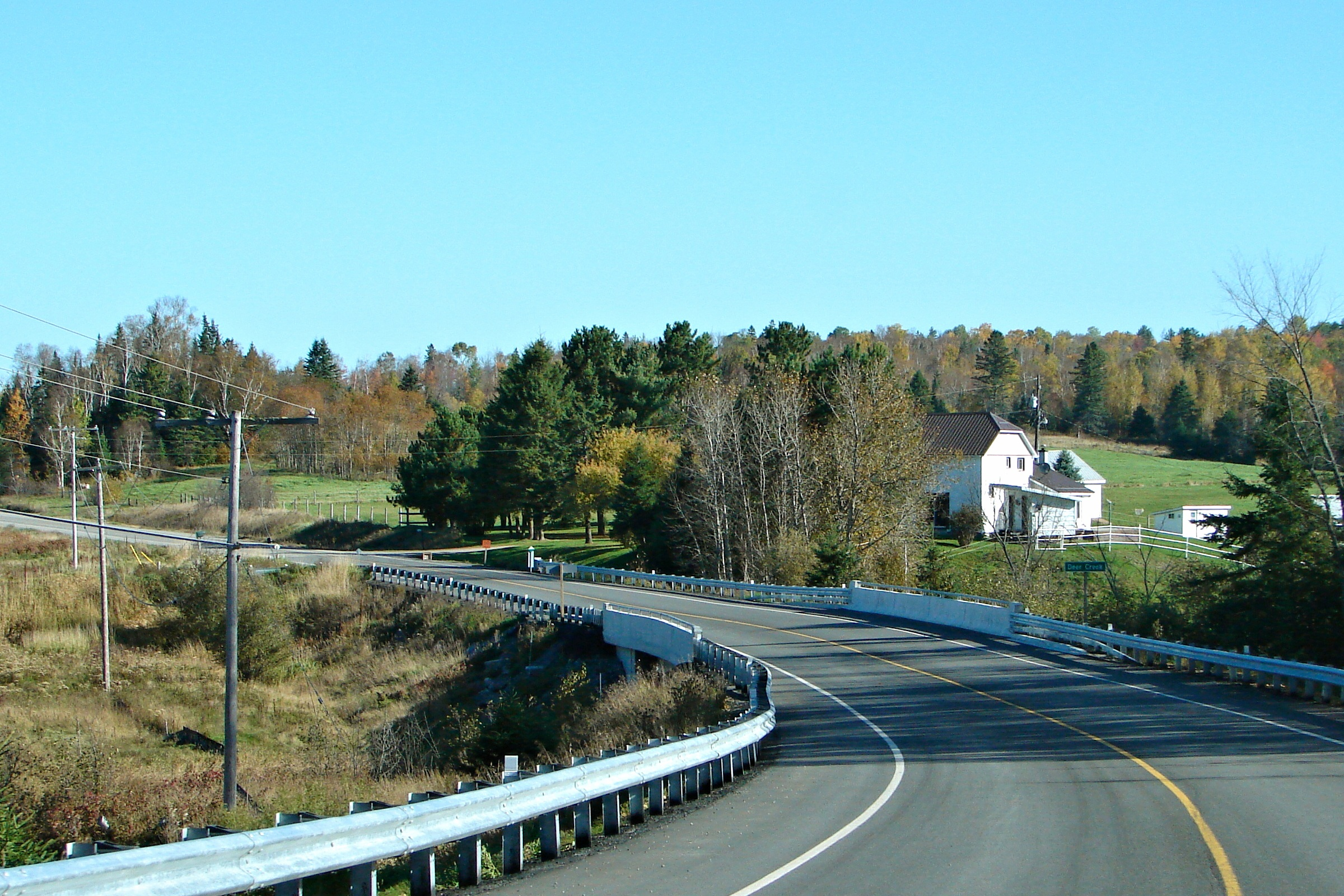
Highway 539 north of Warren

Secondary Highway 539, commonly referred to as Highway 539, is a secondary highway in the Canadian province of Ontario, located within the Sudbury and Nipissing Districts. Commencing at a junction with Highway 17 in the community of Warren, the highway extends northeasterly for 23.3 kilometres (14.5 mi) to the community of River Valley, and thence southeasterly for 13.6 kilometres (8.5 mi) to a junction with Highway 64 in Field.

A spur route, Highway 539A, extends northwesterly from Highway 539 at River Valley.

== Highway 539A ==
Highway 539A

Route information
- Maintained by the Ministry of Transportation of Ontario
- Length: 5.8 km (3.6 mi)
- Existed: 1958–present

Major junctions
- Southeast end: Highway 539 in River Valley
- Northwest end: Highway 805 at the Sudbury–Nipissing boundary

Location
- Country: Canada
- Province: Ontario
- Divisions: Nipissing District
- Towns: West Nipissing, River Valley

Highway system
- Ontario provincial highways; Current; Former; 400-series
| ← Highway 539 | → Highway 540 |

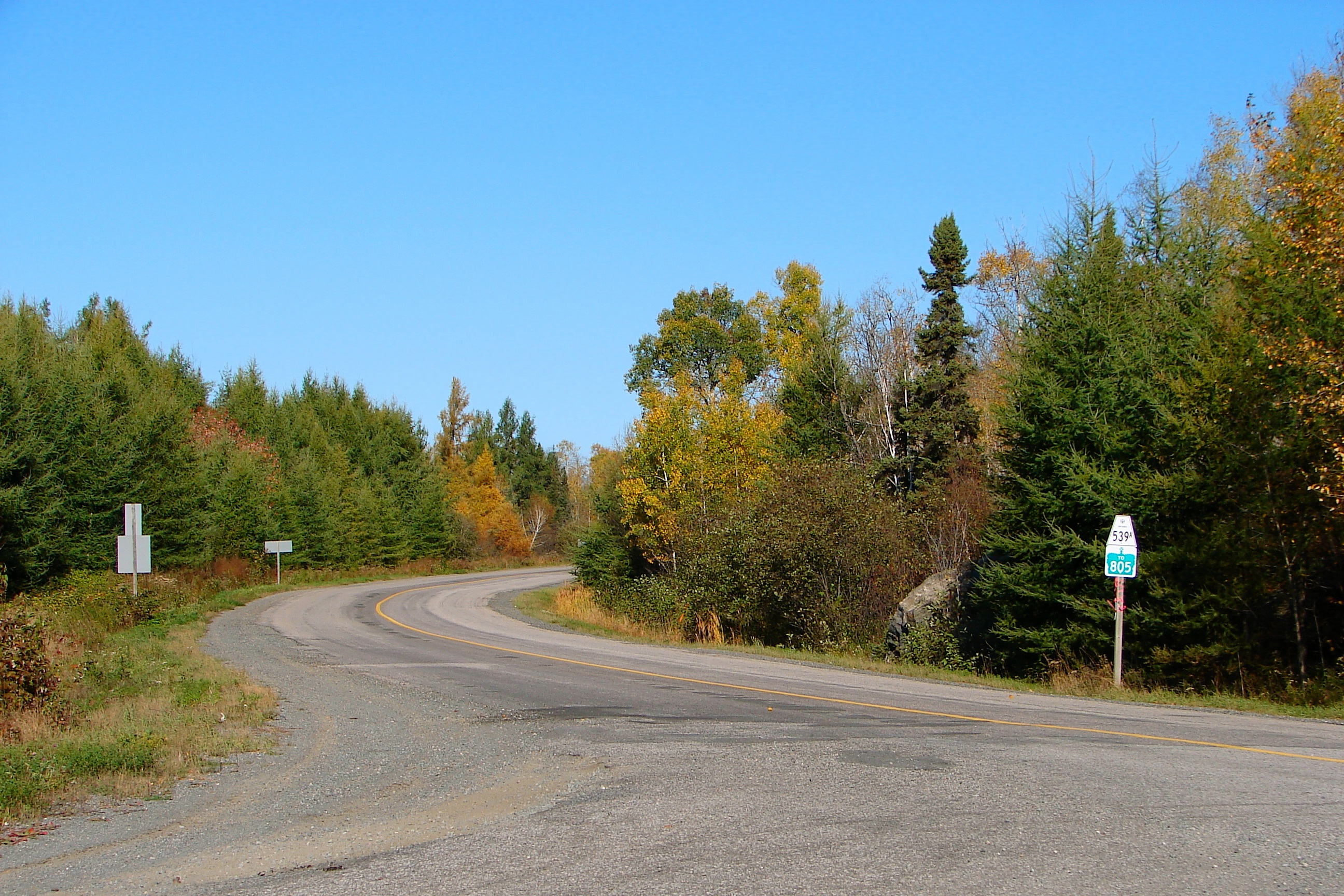
Highway 539A near River Valley

Secondary Highway 539A, commonly referred to as Highway 539A, is a provincially maintained secondary highway in the Canadian province of Ontario, located within Nipissing District. Commencing at a junction with Highway 539 in the community of River Valley, the highway extends northwesterly for 13.1 kilometres (8.1 mi) to a point near where the Sturgeon River crosses the boundary between Nipissing and Sudbury District. At this point, the roadway turns northward and continues as Highway 805.

== Highway 575 ==
Highway 575

Route information
- Maintained by the Ministry of Transportation of Ontario
- Length: 20.0 km (12.4 mi)

Major junctions
- Northeast end: Highway 17 in Verner
- Northwest end: Highway 64 in Field

Location
- Country: Canada
- Province: Ontario
- Divisions: Nipissing District
- Towns: West Nipissing, Verner, Field

Highway system
- Ontario provincial highways; Current; Former; 400-series
| ← Highway 574 | → Highway 577 |
Former provincial highways
| Highway 576 → |

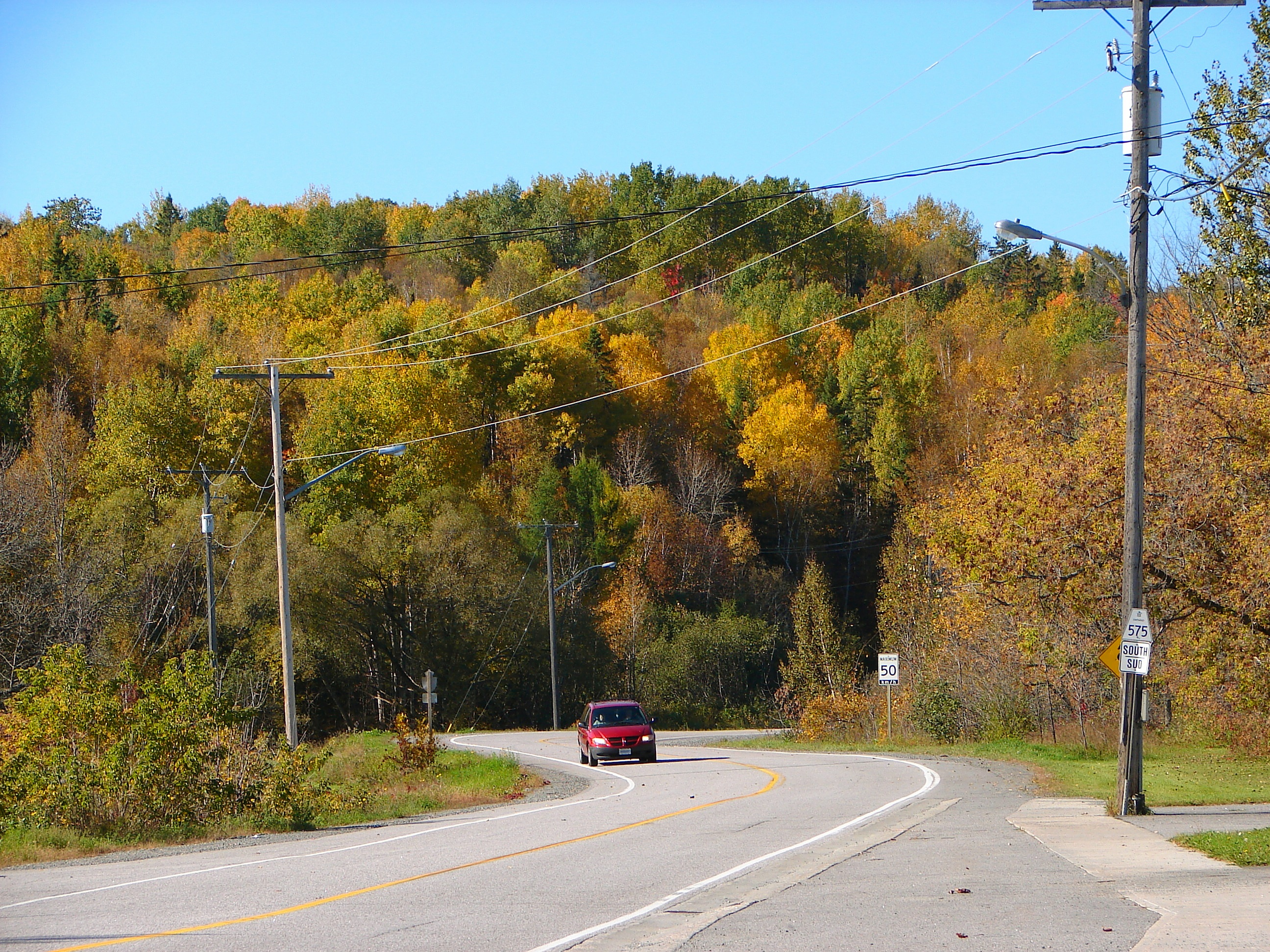
Highway 575 near Field

Secondary Highway 575, commonly referred to as Highway 575, is a secondary highway in the Canadian province of Ontario, located within Nipissing District. Commencing at Highway 17 in Verner, the highway travels to Highway 64 in the community of Field, a distance of 20.0 km (12.4 mi).

== Highway 630 ==
Highway 630

Route information
- Maintained by the Ministry of Transportation of Ontario
- Length: 27.7 km (17.2 mi)
- Existed: July 28, 1961–present

Major junctions
- South end: Algonquin Park Access Point #29 at Kiosk
- North end: Highway 17 / TCH near Eau Claire Station

Location
- Country: Canada
- Province: Ontario
- Divisions: Nipissing District

Highway system
- Ontario provincial highways; Current; Former; 400-series
| ← Highway 628 | → Highway 631 |

Secondary Highway 630, commonly referred to as Highway 630, is a secondary highway in the Canadian province of Ontario. It provides access to Algonquin Provincial Park from the north at Kioshkakwi Lake. It is 27.7 kilometres (17.2 mi) in length and links Highway 17 with the community of Kiosk. It was assumed as a provincial route on July 28, 1961, by which time it was paved north of Eau Claire.

== Highway 656 ==
Highway 656

Route information
- Maintained by the Ministry of Transportation of Ontario
- Length: 3.7 km (2.3 mi)
- Existed: April 8, 1965–present

Major junctions
- South end: Highway 533 near Mattawa
- North end: Otto Holden Generating Station

Location
- Country: Canada
- Province: Ontario
- Divisions: Nipissing District
- Towns: Mattawan Township

Highway system
- Ontario provincial highways; Current; Former; 400-series
| ← Highway 655 | → Highway 657 |

Secondary Highway 656, commonly referred to as Highway 656, is a secondary highway in the Canadian province of Ontario. It provides access to the Otto Holden Generating Station on the Ottawa River from a junction with Highway 533 located just north of Mattawa, a distance of 3.7 kilometres (2.3 mi). It was established on April 8, 1965.
