= Wolf River (Sudbury District) =

- Location of the mouth of the Wolf River in Ontario

Location
- Country: Canada
- Province: Ontario
- Region: Northeastern Ontario
- District: Sudbury District
- Municipality: French River

Physical characteristics
- Source: Unnamed lake
  - coordinates: 46°08′36″N 80°28′30″W
  - elevation: 217 m (712 ft)
- Mouth: Lac Viau on the Wolseley River
  - coordinates: 46°08′26″N 80°21′27″W
  - elevation: 187 m (614 ft)

Basin features
- River system: Great Lakes Basin

The Wolf River is a river in the municipality of French River, Sudbury District in Northeastern Ontario, Canada. It is in the Great Lakes Basin and is a right tributary of the Wolseley River.

== Course ==
The river begins at an unnamed lake in geographic Cosby Township and heads east, passes the communities of Noëlville and Chartrand Corner, then turns northwest and reaches Lac Viau on the Wolseley River. The Wolseley flows via the French River to Georgian Bay on Lake Huron.

== See also ==
- List of rivers of Ontario

== Sources ==
- Map 8 (PDF) (Map). 1 : 700,000. Official road map of Ontario. Ministry of Transportation of Ontario. 2010-01-01.
- Restructured municipalities - Ontario map #4 (Map). Restructuring Maps of Ontario. Ontario Ministry of Municipal Affairs and Housing. 2006. Archived from the original on 2014-04-10.
