= Ontario Highway 528A =

Ontario provincial highway

Highway 528A

Route information
- Maintained by Ministry of Transportation of Ontario
- Length: 5.1 km (3.2 mi)
- Existed: 1957–present

Major junctions
- West end: Highway 528 near Wolseley Bay
- East end: Dead end at French River

Location
- Country: Canada
- Province: Ontario
- Divisions: Sudbury District

Highway system
- Ontario provincial highways; Current; Former; 400-series
← Highway 528	→ Highway 529

Secondary Highway 528A, commonly referred to as Highway 528A, is a provincially maintained secondary highway in the Canadian province of Ontario. The 5.1-kilometre (3.2 mi) spur route links the community of Wolseley Bay in French River with several lodge resorts to the southeast. The route ends suddenly within viewing distance of the French River, where a driveway continues into a lodge.

== Route description ==
Highway 528A is a short route located on the northern edge of Parry Sound District in central Ontario, which provides access to several private recreational properties that front Wolseley Bay, a large body of water attached to Lake Nipissing to the northeast and forms the delta of the Wolseley River. The short 5.1-kilometre (3.2 mi) highway begins at Highway 528 approximately 1.5 kilometres (0.93 mi) west of the community of Wolseley Bay, and travels southeasterly. It passes through dense forest for the majority of its entire length, though grasslands appear briefly near the midpoint of the route. Though the route is located in the Canadian Shield, there are no rock outcroppings visible along its length. The highway ends at a cul-de-sac where a private driveway continues to a lodge.

== History ==
Highway 528A was first assumed by the Department of Highways in 1957, and was likely provincially maintained as a development road prior to that. Since then, the route has remained unchanged.

== Major intersections ==
The following table lists the major junctions along Highway 528A. The entirety of the route is located within Sudbury District.

Location	km	Destinations	Notes
French River	0.0	Highway 528 – Wolseley Bay	
French River	5.1		Dead end; private access to Pine Cove Lodge
1.000 mi = 1.609 km; 1.000 km = 0.621 mi
