= Ontario Highway 64 =

Ontario provincial highway

Highway 64

Route information
- Maintained by Ministry of Transportation of Ontario
- Length: 145.0 km (90.1 mi)
- Existed: August 25, 1937–present

Major junctions
- South end: Highway 69 at Rutter
- Highway 607 near Alban; Highway 528 near Noelville; Highway 535 in Noelville; Highway 17 between Verner and Sturgeon Falls (15 km (9 mi) concurrency); Highway 575 in Field; Highway 539 in Field
- North end: Highway 11 in Marten River

Location
- Country: Canada
- Province: Ontario

Highway system
- Ontario provincial highways; Current; Former; 400-series
← Highway 63	→ Highway 65

King's Highway 64, commonly referred to as Highway 64, is a provincially maintained highway in the Canadian province of Ontario, connecting Highway 69 north of the French River with Highway 11 at Marten River, via Highway 17 west of Sturgeon Falls. The route serves several communities along the north shore of the French River and west shore of Lake Nipissing as it travels from Highway 69 to Highway 17. North of Sturgeon Falls, the highway provides a shortcut between Highway 17 and Highway 11 northwest of North Bay.

Highway 64 was first assumed in 1937, the year that the Ontario Department of Highways (DHO) merged with the Department of Northern Development (DND) and began assigning route numbers in northern Ontario. It initially connected only Highway 17 and Highway 11, as Highway 69 was not completed through French River until after World War II. In 1956, the route was extended southwest to Rutter via Noëlville to meet Highway 69, establishing the route as it exists today.

== Route description ==
The southern terminus of Highway 64 is an interchange with Highway 69 in Sudbury District at Rutter. Formerly a grade-level intersection, this terminus was upgraded to a full interchange which officially opened in 2016, as part of the ongoing freeway conversion of Highway 69. West of the interchange, the roadway continues as Daoust Lake Road.

The highway travels east for approximately 26 kilometres (16 mi), where it intersects with Highway 528. At that intersection, Highway 528 continues east, while Highway 64 turns north for four kilometres to Noëlville, where it intersects with Highway 535. Highway 535 continues north, while Highway 64 heads east again for six kilometres to the community of Chartrand Corner.

Highway 64 continues, alternating in northward and eastward segments around the west arm of Lake Nipissing, crossing into Nipissing District just north of Mashkinonje Provincial Park, and eventually intersecting with Highway 17 at Verner. It then shares the routing of Highway 17 eastward for 15 kilometres (9 mi), to Sturgeon Falls, where it again heads northward for 57 kilometres to its northern terminus, intersecting Highway 11 at Marten River.

The Ministry of Transportation of Ontario routinely performs traffic analysis on provincial highways, generating an average vehicle count per day over the course of a year at various sections along the routes. In 2016, the busiest section of Highway 64 was between Highway 69 and Highway 607, carrying an average of 2,200 vehicles per day. Likewise, the least busy section is at the opposite end of the highway, between Highway 539 and Highway 11, carrying an average of 810 vehicles per day.

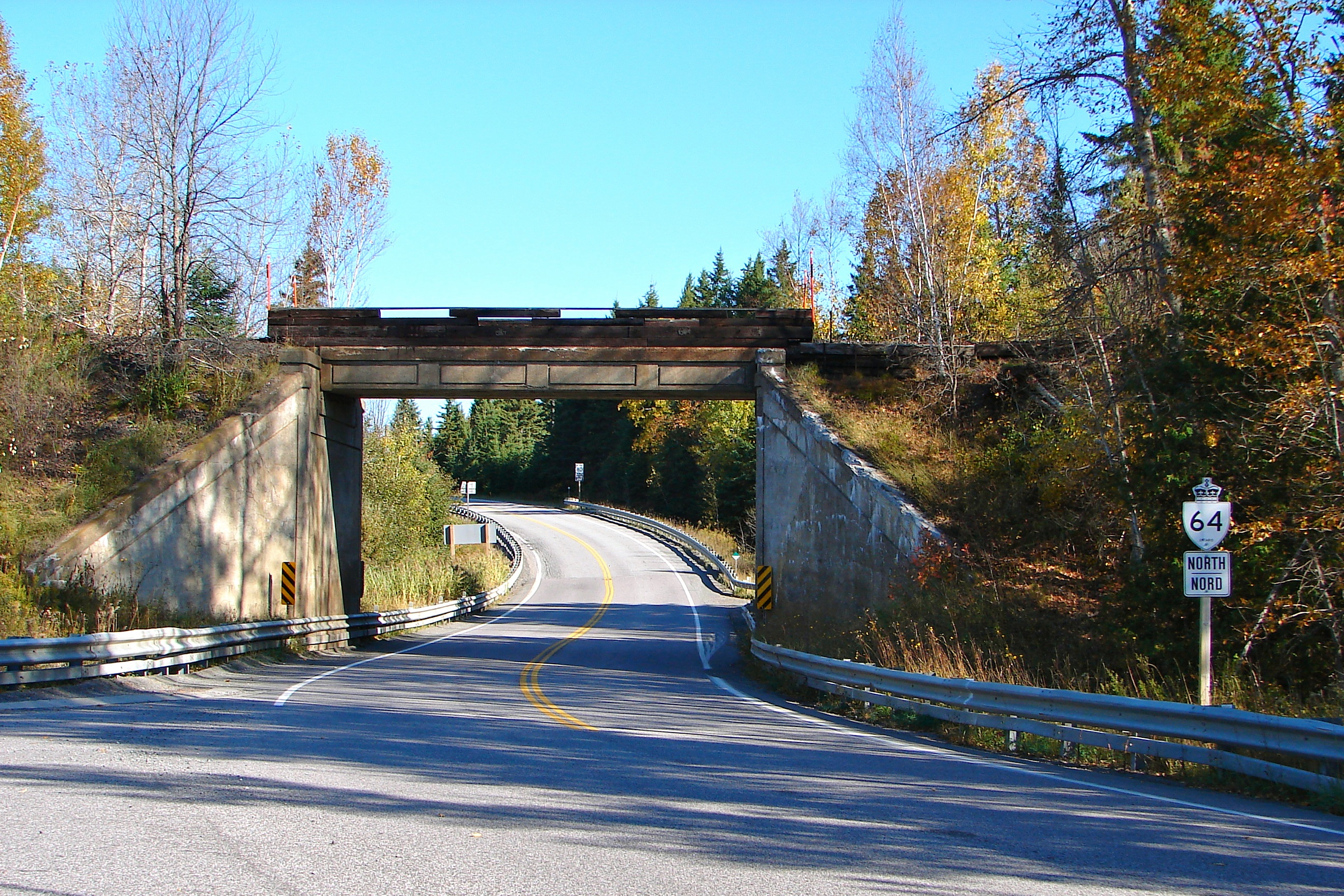
Highway 64 at Field

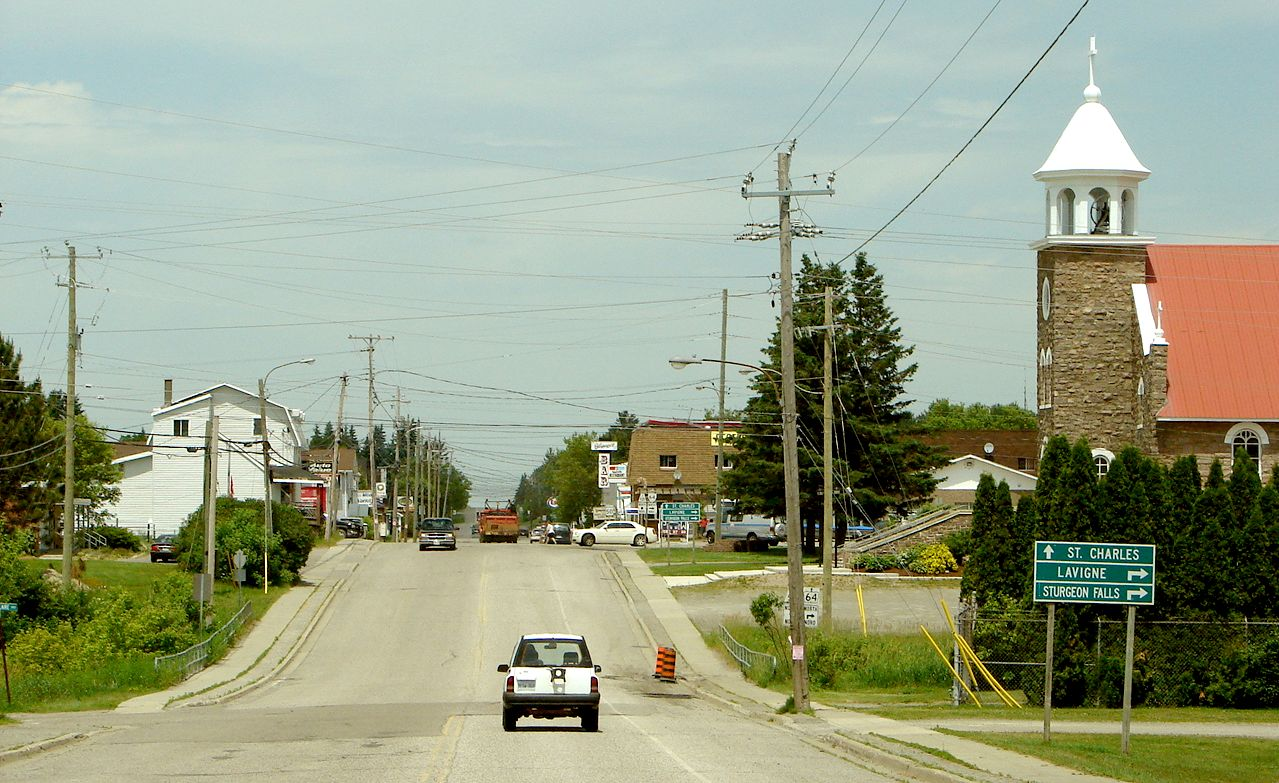
Highway 64 at Noëlville

== History ==
The Sturgeon Falls Road was first assumed by the DHO as Highway 64 on August 25, 1937, shortly after the merger with the DND. The route was 53.6 kilometres (33.3 mi) long when it was first established, connecting Highway 11 and Highway 17. As Highway 69 did not exist between Parry Sound and Sudbury until the 1950s, there was no need for a second highway connection through the French River area. However, on January 25, 1956 the highway was extended south through Nipissing District, followed on February 8, 1956 with an extension through Sudbury District to the now-completed Highway 69. This brought Highway 64 to its current length. Since then, aside from paving and minor realignments, Highway 64 has remained unchanged apart from the conversion of its junction with Highway 69 from a regular intersection to a freeway interchange. As part of the ongoing expansion of Highway 69 to a freeway, an interchange was constructed immediately south of the intersection between the two highways. It was completed on July 15, 2016, and opened to traffic shortly thereafter.

== Major intersections ==
The following table lists the major junctions along Highway 64, as noted by the Ministry of Transportation of Ontario.

Division	Location	km	mi	Destinations	Notes
Sudbury	French River	0.0	0.0	Highway 69 / TCH – Sudbury, Toronto	Interchange; future Highway 400
Sudbury	French River	5.1	3.2	Highway 607	
Sudbury	French River	18.3	11.4	Highway 528 – Wolseley Bay	
Sudbury	Noelville	21.5	13.4	Highway 535 – Hagar	
Sudbury	French River	43.5	27.0	Muskrat Creek Bridge; Sudbury – Nipissing boundary	
Nipissing
Nipissing	Verner	72.0	44.7	Highway 17 west / TCH – Sudbury	Beginning of Highway 17 concurrency
Nipissing	Sturgeon Falls	87.1	54.1	Highway 17 east / TCH – North Bay	End of Highway 17 concurrency; beginning of Sturgeon Falls Connecting Link agreement
Nipissing	Sturgeon Falls	89.5	55.6		Sturgeon Falls town limits; end of Connecting Link agreement
Nipissing	Field	109.8	68.2	Highway 575	
Nipissing	Field	110.4	68.6	Highway 539	
Nipissing	Marten River	145.0	90.1	Highway 11 / TCH – Cochrane, North Bay	
1.000 mi = 1.609 km; 1.000 km = 0.621 mi: Concurrency terminus
