= Brunswick House First Nation =

Indigenous community in Ontario, Canada

Coordinates: 47°49′59″N 83°19′52″W

Brunswick House First Nation is an Ojibway-Cree First Nations in the Canadian province of Ontario, located in the Sudbury District, 157 km (97.6 mi) northeast of Sault Ste Marie, Ontario. The First Nation have reserved for themselves the 9,054.2 hectares (22,373.4 acres) Mountbatten 76A Indian Reserve and the 259.8 hectares (642.0 acres) Duck Lake 76B Indian Reserve. As of June 2025, it had a registered population of 763 members, of which 121 live on-Reserve.

Brunswick House is policed by the Nishnawbe-Aski Police Service, an Aboriginal-based service.

== Background ==
Originally known as the New Brunswick House Band of Ojibway, the Ojibway people who during the fur trade era traded primarily at the New Brunswick House posts at Brunswick Lake and Missinaibi Lake became a signatory to Treaty 9. Originally, the Band had reserved for themselves the 17,280 acres (6,993.0 ha) New Brunswick House 76 Indian Reserve, but on June 1, 1925, the Ontario government established the Chapleau Game Preserve which surrounded (and did not explicitly exclude) the New Brunswick House reserve and was closed to all hunting and trapping. The Ontario government subsequently purchased reserve land from the federal government in 1928. In 1947, the federal government purchased a tract of land in Mountbatten Township from the Ontario government and established the Mountbatten 76A Indian Reserve. The Band moved to its present reserve at Duck Lake 76B Indian Reserve after 642 acres (259.8 ha) of the Mountbatten 76A were exchanged in 1973 for an equivalent area of land closer to Chapleau, Ontario.

== Governance ==
Brunswick House First Nation elects their leaders through the Act Electoral System, consisting of a Chief and six Councillors. The current Chief is Cheryl St. Denis, and the Councillors are Amberly Quakegesic, Melanie Quackegesic, Angela Saunders, Kevin Tangie, and Lorraine Tangie.

Brunswick House First Nation is affiliated with the Wabun Tribal Council, and is part of the Nishnawbe Aski Nation.
