= West Nipissing =

West Nipissing Nipissing-Ouest
- Municipality (single-tier)
- Municipality of West Nipissing; Municipalité de Nipissing-Ouest
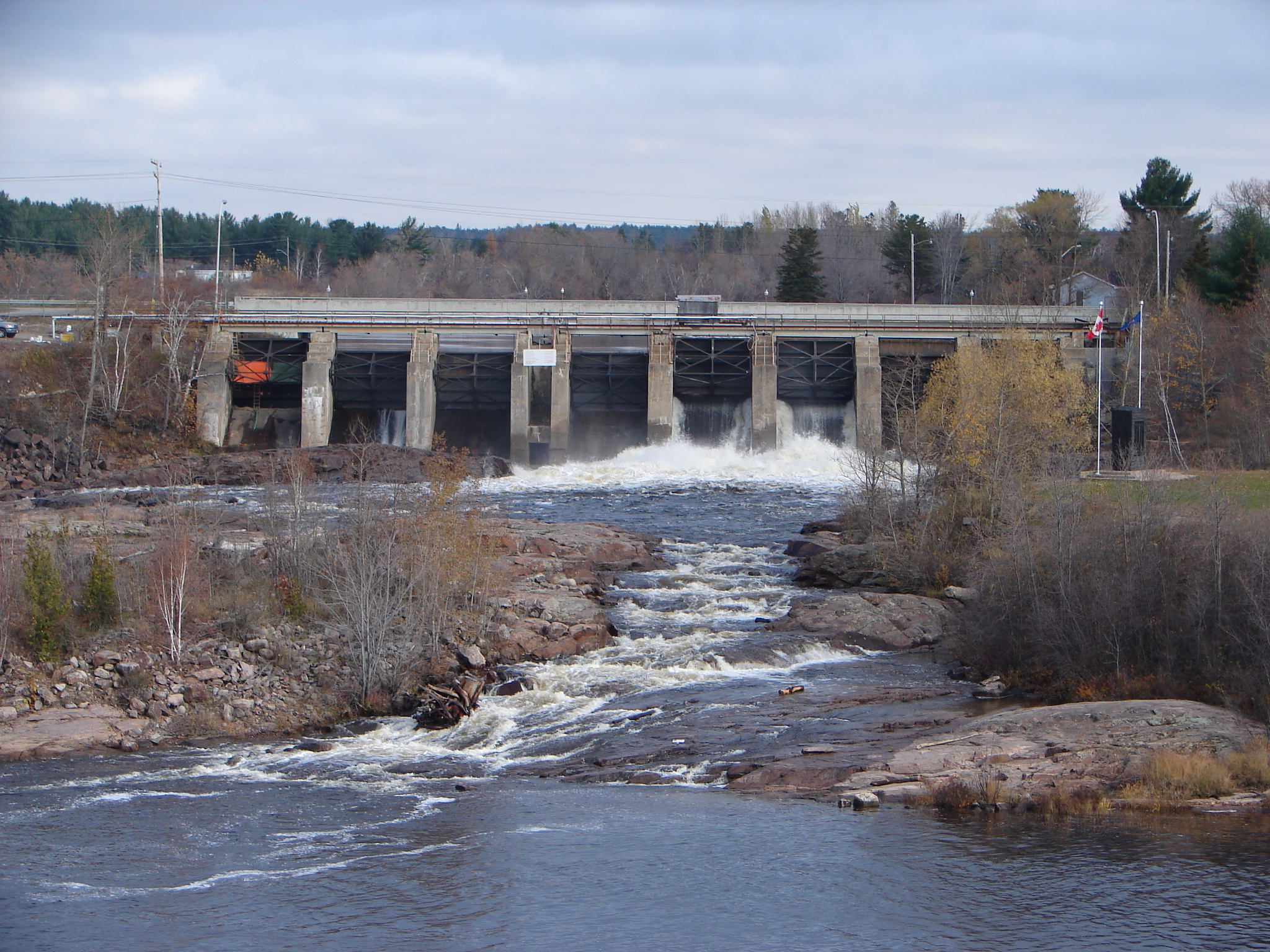
- Power dam on the Sturgeon River in Sturgeon Falls

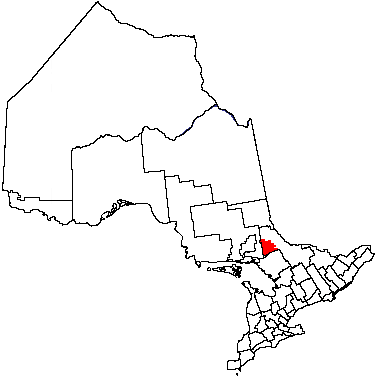
- Coordinates: 46°22′N 79°55′W
- Country: Canada
- Province: Ontario
- District: Nipissing
- Established: January 1, 1999

Government
  - Mayor: Kathleen Thorne Rochon
  - Governing Body: West Nipissing Town Council
  - MPs: Jim Belanger (Conservative)
  - MPPs: John Vanthof (NDP), Vic Fedeli (PC)

Area
  - Total: 1,956.27 km^{2} (755.32 sq mi)

Population (2021)
  - Total: 14,583
  - Density: 7.5/km^{2} (19/sq mi)
- Time zone: UTC−5 (EST)
  - Summer (DST): UTC−4 (EDT)
- Postal Code: P0H, P2B
- Area codes: 705, 249
- Website: www.westnipissing.ca

West Nipissing is a municipality in Northeastern Ontario, Canada, on Lake Nipissing in the Nipissing District. It was formed on January 1, 1999, with the amalgamation of seventeen and a half former towns, villages, townships and unorganized communities.

It is the most bilingual community in Ontario, with 73.4% of its population fluent in both English and French. And 96% of its population being french.

== Communities ==
The primary administrative and commercial centre of West Nipissing is the community of Sturgeon Falls, which is situated on the Sturgeon River, 5 kilometres (3.1 mi) north of Lake Nipissing and 35 kilometres (22 mi) west of North Bay on Highway 17, part of the Trans-Canada Highway. Roughly half the population of West Nipissing lives in Sturgeon Falls.

Field is located on Highway 64, approximately 20 kilometres (12 mi) north of Sturgeon Falls. In 1979, the Sturgeon River overflowed its banks, flooding the town's centre. Many houses were demolished and rebuilt on higher ground nearby. The Thistle Fire Tower is to be dismantled and re-erected here as a tourist attraction. Logging, farming and outdoor recreational activities are main village industries.

Verner is located on the Veuve River (Rivière Veuve), at the western junction of highways 17 and 64, approximately 16 kilometres (9.9 mi) west of Sturgeon Falls. The largely francophone community serves as an agricultural hub for the surrounding area and offers a consumers' cooperative and farm equipment dealers. The town was named for the wife of Canadian Pacific Railway superintendent Archer Baker, who oversaw the laying of track through the West Nipissing area in the 1880s.

Many of the francophone settlers immigrated to the area from Michigan in the late 19th century in order to preserve their language; they were concerned they would lose their language in the predominantly anglophone United States. Many of the families that settled in Lavigne and Verner came from the Lanaudière region of Quebec from villages such as St-Félix-de-Valois, St-Gabriel-de-Brandon and Ste-Élisabeth.

Smaller communities in the municipality include Cache Bay, Caderette, Crystal Falls, Desaulniers, Evansville, Harfred, Kirk, Lavigne, Notre-Dame-du-Lac, Domrémy and River Valley. It also includes part of the North Monetville area, which straddles the boundary between West Nipissing and French River. The Nipissing First Nation is also located nearby and is closely associated with West Nipissing.

Cache Bay, named after the nearby water feature on a "hidden bay" of Lake Nipissing, had a post office that was established in 1889.

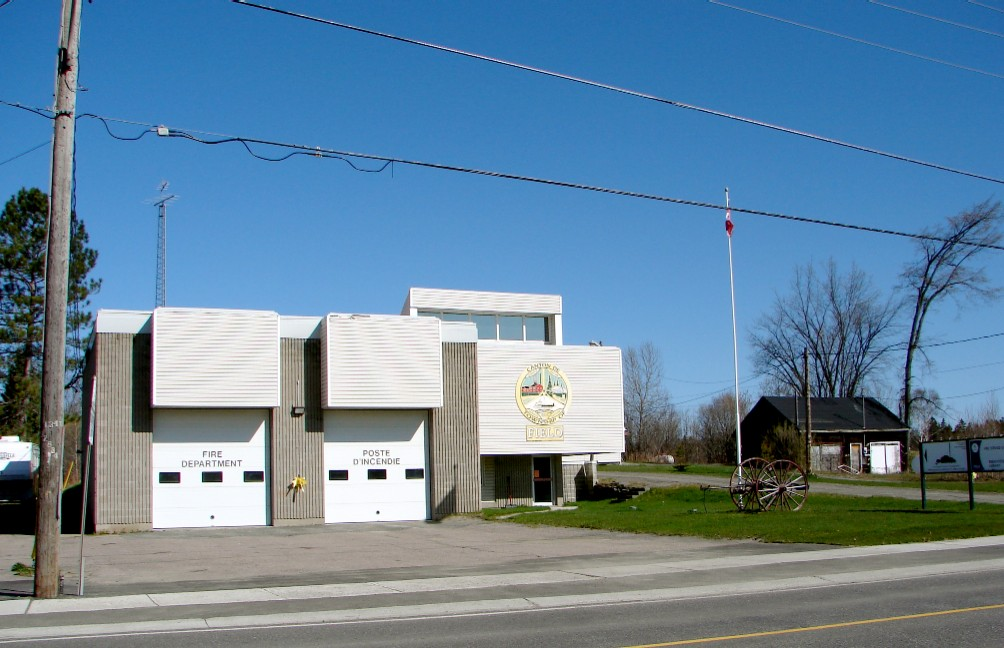
Field

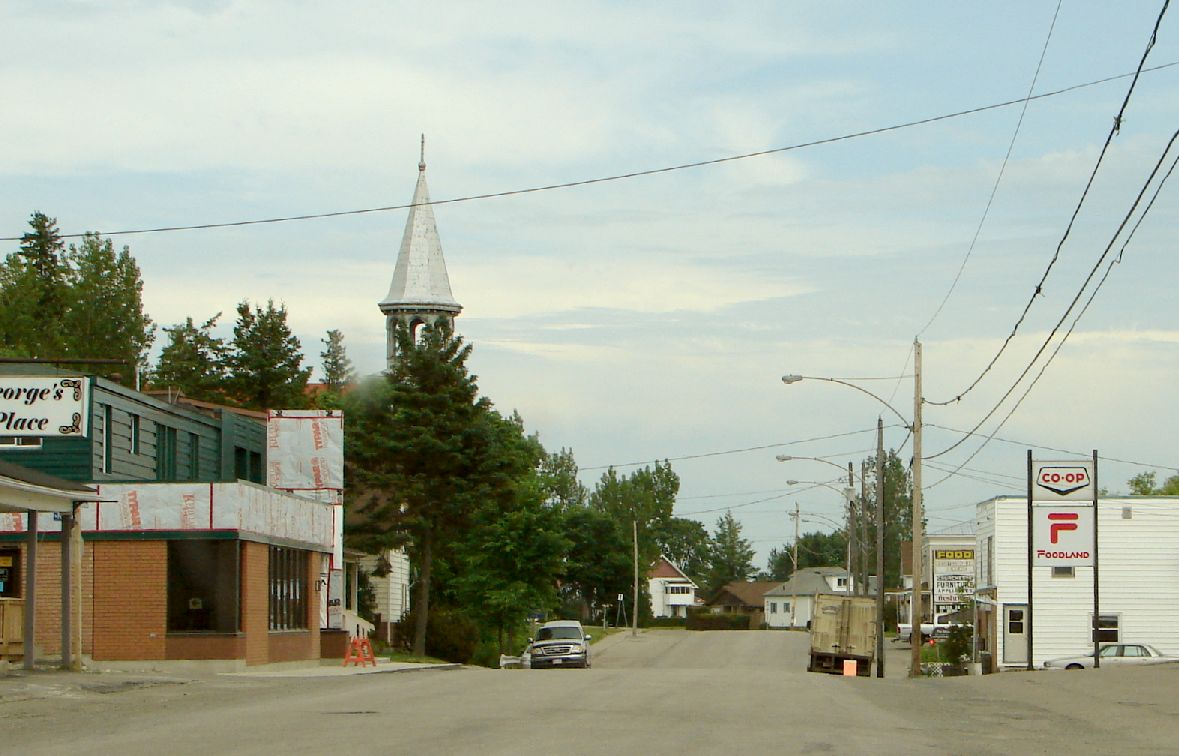
Verner

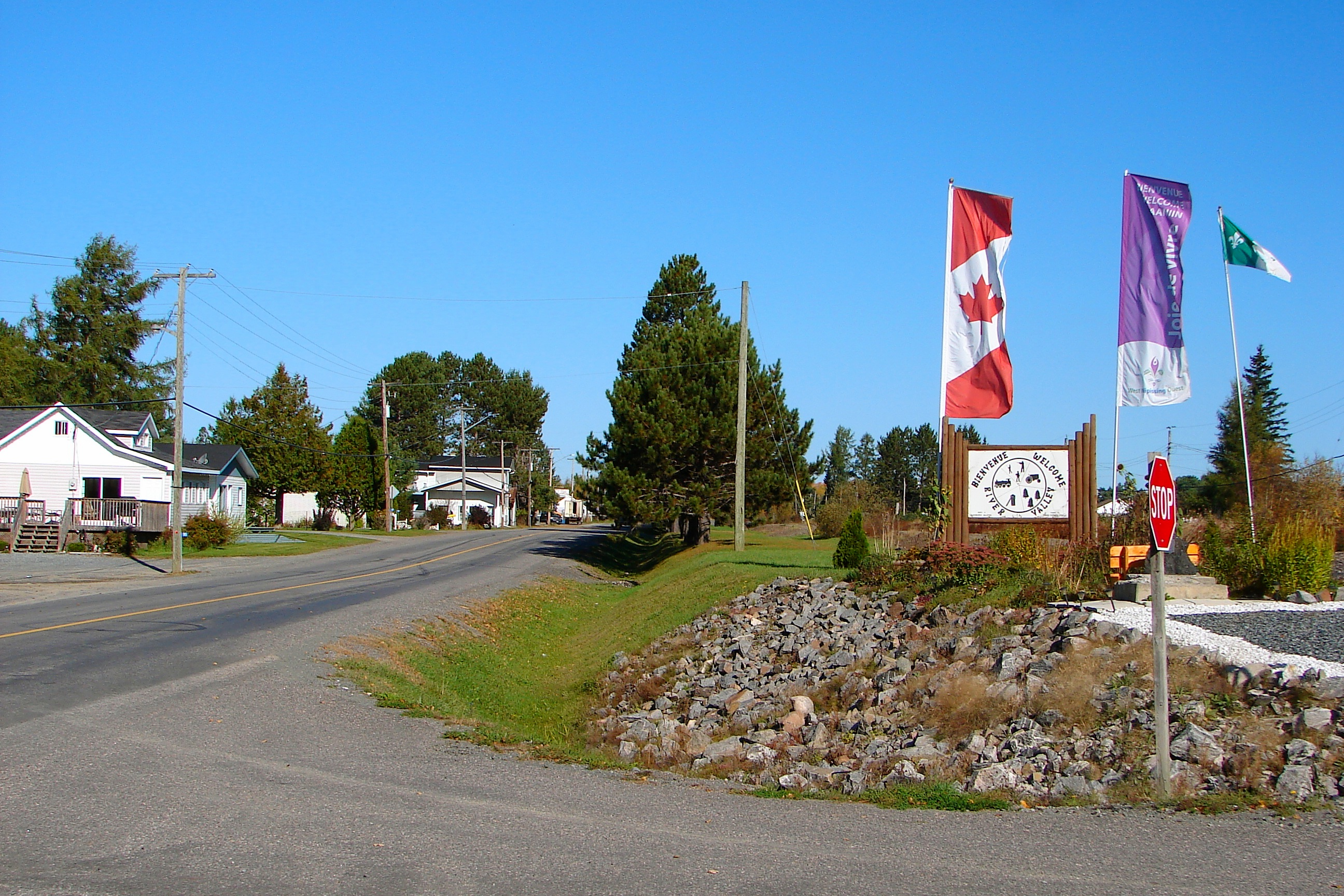
River Valley

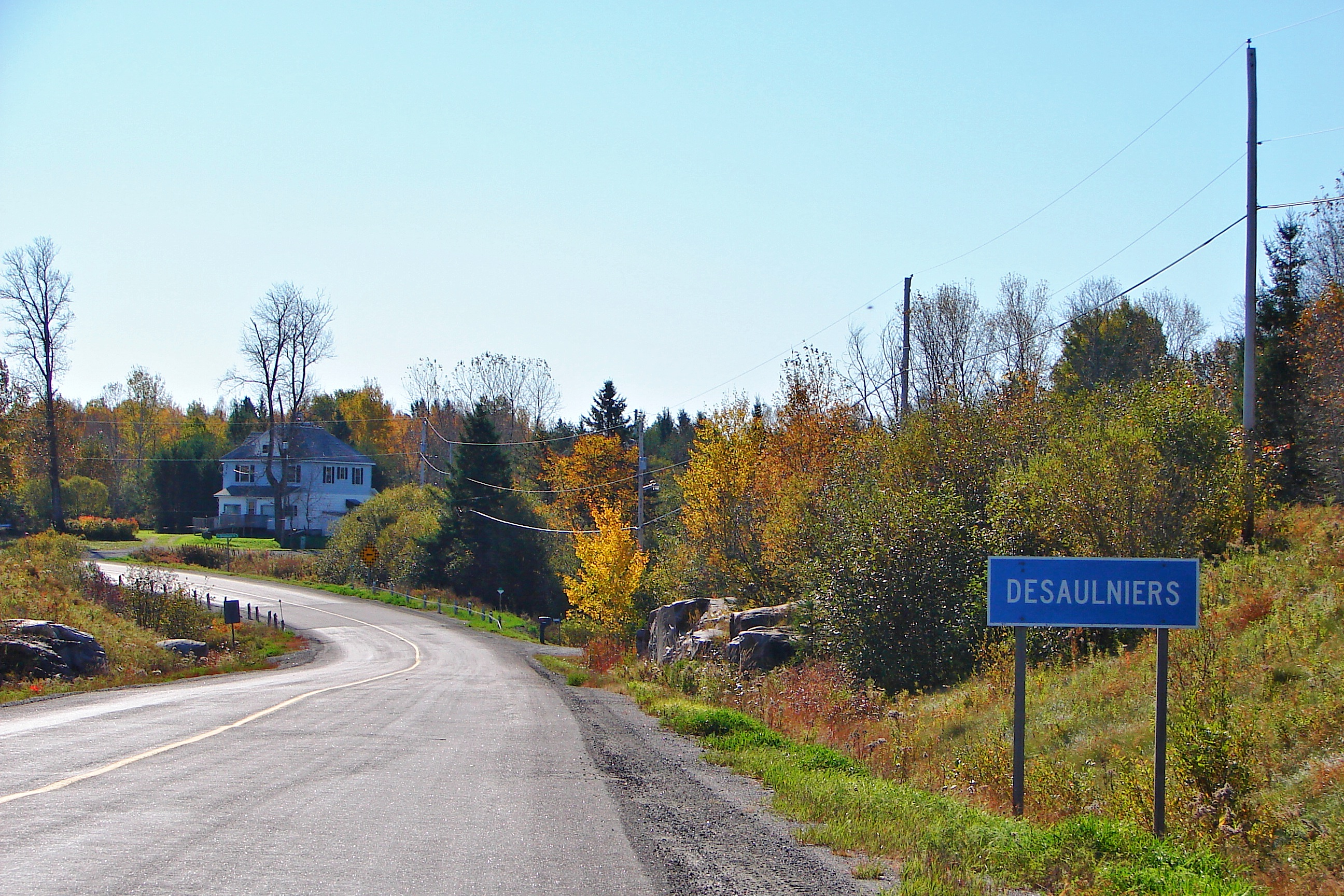
Desaulniers

== History ==
The original inhabitants of the area are the N'Biissing, an Anishinabek people, and many N'Biissing still inhabit the area today. A trading post was founded in the last quarter of the 18th century on an island on Lake Nipissing at the mouth of the La Vase River, called Fort La Ronde and was operated by Louis Denis de la Ronde (1675–1741). Fort La Ronde was moved numerous times to different islands on Lake Nipissing. It was later sold to North West Company. It was later bought by the Hudson's Bay Company around 1820 and was later relocated on the right bank of the river several hundred metres below the falls, at the mouth of Sturgeon River, trading with the N'Biissing for furs and other goods. James R. Holditch of Utterson, Ontario is generally credited as being the first permanent non-aboriginal settler in the area. He arrived in 1878 and built a cabin on the left bank, near the waterfalls. Nowadays, the Sturgeon River House Museum sits where the HBC trading post was. It was founded as a centennial project in 1967 by the Historical Restoration Committee of the Sturgeon Falls Secondary High School, the Township of Springer and the Town of Cache Bay, in cooperation and funded by the Government of Canada and the Government of Ontario. It was renovated and re-opened in 1999 and upgraded to include a permanent building capable of being open year-round and vastly improved its exhibits. It is now an agency of the Municipality of West Nipissing and supports the West Nipissing tax base.

The region began to grow in the 1880s, with the arrival of the Canadian Pacific Railway (CPR) and the efforts of Fr. Charles Alfred Marie Paradis, an Oblate missionary, to develop an agricultural settlement for Franco-Ontarians in the Verner area.

The development of Sturgeon Falls began in 1881 with the arrival of Canadian Pacific Railway construction crews. The area's first post office was opened in Sturgeon Falls in 1881. Lumbering and the establishment of pulp and paper industries accelerated the village's growth and attracted many French-Canadian settlers to the area.

The addition of sawmills and the rapid growth of the lumbering and pulp and paper industries stimulated the development of the village and attracted many French-Canadian settlers to the area. The town of Sturgeon Falls was incorporated on April 16, 1895. At the time, J. A. Lévis was elected the first mayor and the population was 850.

The Canadian Pacific Railway was joined by the Canadian Northern Railway in 1915, with its line between Capreol and North Bay. This line later became the Canadian National Railway Alderdale Subdivision, with station stops (from east to west) in Harfred, Crystal Falls, Ashburton, Field, Desaulniers, and River Valley, along with several industrial spurs to serve local industries. CN rail service declined in the mid-20th century and was eliminated altogether in 1996.

The community of Field suffered two significant natural disasters in the 1970s. On August 20, 1970, it was hit by a small tornado associated with the Sudbury tornado event. In the spring of 1979 the Sturgeon River overflowed its banks at Field, causing massive flooding in the town's centre. Half the town that was located in the flood plain was relocated to higher ground two kilometres south of the original town centre on Highway 64. This new location is known as New Field (Val-des-Arbres).

On January 1, 1999, the Town of Cache Bay, Town of Sturgeon Falls, Township of Caldwell, Township of Field, the Township of Springer, and the unorganized townships of Bertram, Latchford, Falconer, Loudon, MacPherson, Beaucage, Pedley, Kirkpatrick, Grant, Badgerow, Hugel, Fell, Bastedo, Gibbons, Crerar, McWilliams, Dana and part of Jane were amalgamated to form the new Municipality of West Nipissing.

== Demographics ==
In the 2021 Census of Population conducted by Statistics Canada, West Nipissing had a population of 14,583 living in 6,413 of its 7,252 total private dwellings, a change of 1.5% from its 2016 population of 14,364. With a land area of 1,956.27 km^{2} (755.32 sq mi), it had a population density of 7.5/km^{2} (19.3/sq mi) in 2021.

Canada census – West Nipissing / Nipissing Ouest community profile

| | 2021 | 2016 | 2011 |
| Population | 14,583 (1.5% from 2016) | 14,364 (1.5% from 2011) | 14,149 (5.5% from 2006) |
| Land area | 1,956.27 km^{2} (755.32 sq mi) | 1,993.68 km^{2} (769.76 sq mi) | 1,992.08 km^{2} (769.15 sq mi) |
| Population density | 7.5/km^{2} (19/sq mi) | 7.2/km^{2} (19/sq mi) | 7.1/km^{2} (18/sq mi) |
| Median age | 51.2 (M: 50.4, F: 51.6) | 45.5 (M: 45.0, F: 46.0) | 47.1 (M: 46.7, F: 47.5) |
| Private dwellings | 7,252 (total) 6,413 (occupied) | 7,013 (total) | 7,156 (total) |
| Median household income | $69,500 | $55,390 |

References: 2021 2016 2011

Historical census populations – West Nipissing / Nipissing Ouest
| Year | Pop. | ±% |
|---|---|---|
| 2001 | 13,114 | — |
| 2006 | 13,410 | +2.3% |
| 2011 | 14,149 | +5.5% |
| 2016 | 14,364 | +1.5% |
| 2021 | 14,583 | +1.5% |
Source: Statistics Canada

Mother tongue (2021):

- English as first language: 38.0%
- French as first language: 56.2%
- English and French as first language: 3.8%
- Other as first language: 1.7%

== Transportation ==
Ontario Northland motor coach service makes scheduled stops in Sturgeon Falls and Verner.

== Media and education ==
The region is served primarily by broadcast stations from North Bay and Sudbury. Two commercial radio stations, CFSF-FM and CHYQ-FM, broadcast from Sturgeon Falls.

The area has a bilingual weekly newspaper, Tribune: West Nipissing This Week / La Voix du Nipissing Ouest, which was previously called The Sturgeon Falls Tribune. It is also served by the daily North Bay Nugget.

Students attend either Northern Secondary School (École secondaire publique Northern) or École secondaire catholique Franco-Cité.

== Notable people ==
- Richard Deschatelets, Wrestler in the 1976 summer olympics
- Harry Bain, former paediatrician-in-chief of the Hospital for Sick Children and the University of Toronto's department chairman of paediatrics
- Jean Éthier-Blais, writer and literary critic at Le Devoir
- Jean-Jacques Blais, former cabinet member in the Canadian government
- Louise Charron, first Franco-Ontarian justice of the Supreme Court of Canada
- Mitch Gagnon, UFC fighter
- France Gareau, 1984 Olympics athlete who won a silver medal in the 4x100 metres sprints
- Osias Godin, former MP
- Ed Harrington, ex-CFL player
- Carl Legault, former federal politician
- Zotique Mageau, former mayor and MPP and campaigner against Regulation 17
- Moe Mantha, Sr., former NHL player and politician
- Moe Mantha, Jr., former NHL player, raised in Sturgeon Falls
- André Paiement, singer and songwriter
- Rachel Paiement, singer and songwriter
- Jack Roxburgh, politician and president of the Canadian Amateur Hockey Association
- Benoît Serré, former federal politician
- Gaetan Serré, former federal politician
- Marc Serré, current federal politician

== See also ==
- List of francophone communities in Ontario
