= Ontario Highway 535 =

Ontario provincial highway

Highway 535

Route information
- Maintained by Ministry of Transportation of Ontario
- Length: 48.7 km (30.3 mi)
- Existed: 1956–present

Major junctions
- South end: Highway 64 in Noelville
- Highway 17 – Hagar
- North end: Sauve Road / Labelle Road at Riviere Veuve

Location
- Country: Canada
- Province: Ontario
- Districts: Sudbury
- Towns: Markstay-Warren, St. Charles, French River

Highway system
- Ontario provincial highways; Current; Former; 400-series
← Highway 534	→ Highway 537
Former provincial highways
Highway 536 →

Secondary Highway 535, commonly referred to as Highway 535, is a provincially maintained secondary highway in the Canadian province of Ontario. Passing through the municipalities of Markstay-Warren, St. Charles and French River, the highway extends 48.7 kilometres (30.3 mi), generally south to north, from a junction with Highway 64 in Noelville to Riviere Veuve, intersecting Highway 17 in the village of Hagar along the way.

== Route description ==
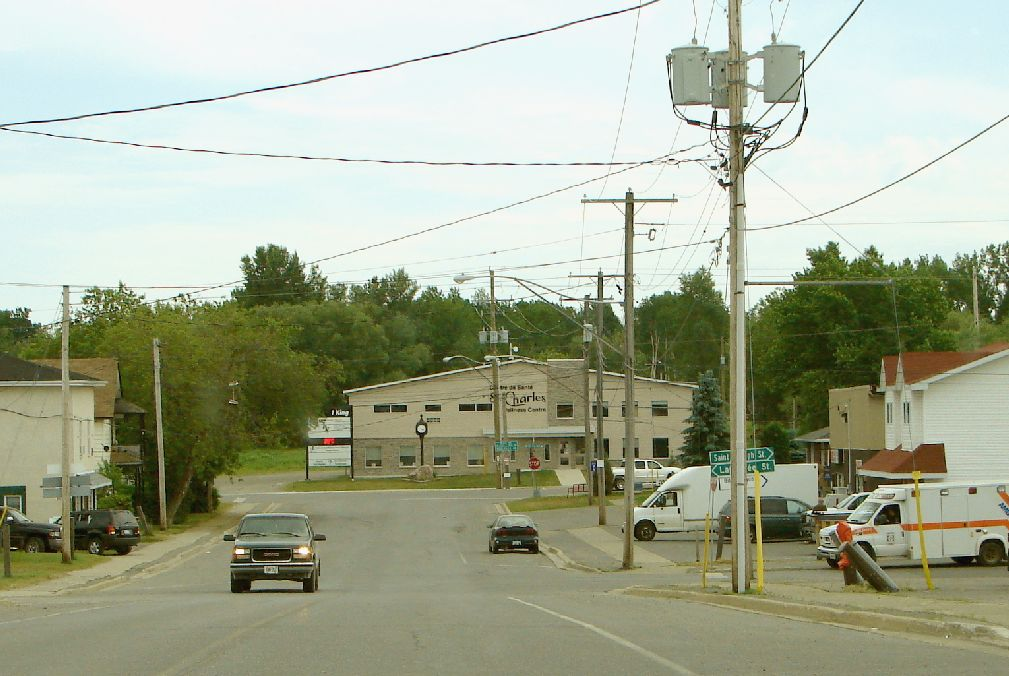
Highway 535 facing south in St. Charles

Highway 535 is a generally straight route oriented in a north–south direction through parts of the Canadian Shield. The two lane highway begins at a junction with Highway 64 in the town of Noëlville, where it is known as David Street North. It proceeds directly north in a straight line for almost 10 kilometres (6.2 mi), crossing the Wolseley River en route. The highway eventually diverges from its straight course prior to crossing the French River at West Arm. It zigzags its way north through rough terrain for several kilometres, passing through several rock outcroppings.

Eventually, the route straightens once more, then curves east and enters St. Charles. Within the village, drivers must turn at a stop sign to remain on Highway 535. From here the highway once again resumes its straight north–south alignment for 6 kilometres (3.7 mi), diverging to cross the Nepewassi River, then entering the village of Hagar, where it intersects Highway 17, the Trans Canada Highway. Immediately north of Highway 17, the route crosses the Veuve River and then a rail line. It curves through the boreal forest for over 10 kilometres (6.2 mi) to Rivière-Veuve, where the highway designation ends at an intersection with Sauve Road to the west and Labelle Road to the east. The roadway continues north as Boundary Road into the wilderness.

== History ==
The current route of Highway 535 was first assumed by the Department of Highways in early 1956, along with several dozen other secondary highways. It was likely maintained as a development road prior to that. It formed the final 14.2 kilometres (8.8 mi) of Highway 556.

== Major intersections ==
The following table lists the major junctions along Highway 535. The entirety of the route is located within Sudbury District.

Location	km	Destinations	Notes
Noelville	0.0	Highway 64	
Hagar	38.4	Highway 17 – Sudbury	Trans-Canada Highway
Riviere Veuve	48.7	Sauve Road / Labelle Road	
1.000 mi = 1.609 km; 1.000 km = 0.621 mi
