= Ontario Highway 528 =

Ontario provincial highway

Highway 528

Route information
- Maintained by Ministry of Transportation of Ontario
- Length: 13.5 km (8.4 mi)
- Existed: 1956–present

Major junctions
- West end: Highway 64 near Noelville
- East end: Natures Trail Road in Wolseley Bay

Location
- Country: Canada
- Province: Ontario
- Divisions: Sudbury District
- Villages: French River

Highway system
- Ontario provincial highways; Current; Former; 400-series
← Highway 527	→ Highway 528A

Secondary Highway 528, commonly referred to as Highway 528, is a provincially maintained secondary highway in the Canadian province of Ontario. It links the community of Wolseley Bay in French River with Highway 64. The route also has a short spur, Highway 528A. Highway 528 was designated, along with most secondary highways in the province, in 1956. It has remained unchanged since then.

== Route description ==
Highway 528 begins at an intersection with Highway 64 south of the community of Noelville, travelling east. The straight route travels through farmland initially, before entering the rock-infested Canadian Shield. Approximately 1.5 kilometres (0.93 mi) from its western terminus, the highway has a junction with its spur route, Highway 528A. The route enters Wolseley Bay and terminates at the Wolseley Bay Aerodrome.

Like other provincial routes in Ontario, Highway 528 is maintained by the Ministry of Transportation of Ontario. In 2010, traffic surveys conducted by the ministry showed that on average, 640 vehicles used the highway daily along the section between Highway 64 and the Highway 528A junction while 220 vehicles did so each day along the section east of Highway 528A, the highest and lowest counts along the highway, respectively.

== History ==
Highway 528 was first assumed by the Department of Highways in early 1956, along with several dozen other secondary highways, but was likely provincially maintained as a development road prior to that. The route has not changed since that time.

== Major intersections ==
The following table lists the major junctions along Highway 528. The entirety of the route is located within Sudbury District.

Location	km	Destinations	Notes
French River	0.0	Highway 64 – Noelville	
French River	11.9	Highway 528A	
Wolseley Bay	13.5		Highway ends at bridge over Wolseley River; continues as Nature's Trail Road
1.000 mi = 1.609 km; 1.000 km = 0.621 mi
