= Duck Lake 76B =

- Indian reserve
- Duck Lake 76B Indian Reserve
- Location within Ontario
- Coordinates: 47°50′N 83°20′W
- Country: Canada
- Province: Ontario
- District: Sudbury
- First Nation: Brunswick House

Area
  - Land: 1.95 km^{2} (0.75 sq mi)

Population (2011)
  - Total: 84
  - Density: 43.1/km^{2} (112/sq mi)
- Website: www.brunswickhouse firstnation.com

Duck Lake 76B is a First Nations reserve in Sudbury District, Ontario. It is one of two reserves for the Brunswick House First Nation.
