= Sudbury tornado =

1970 F3 tornado in Ontario, Canada

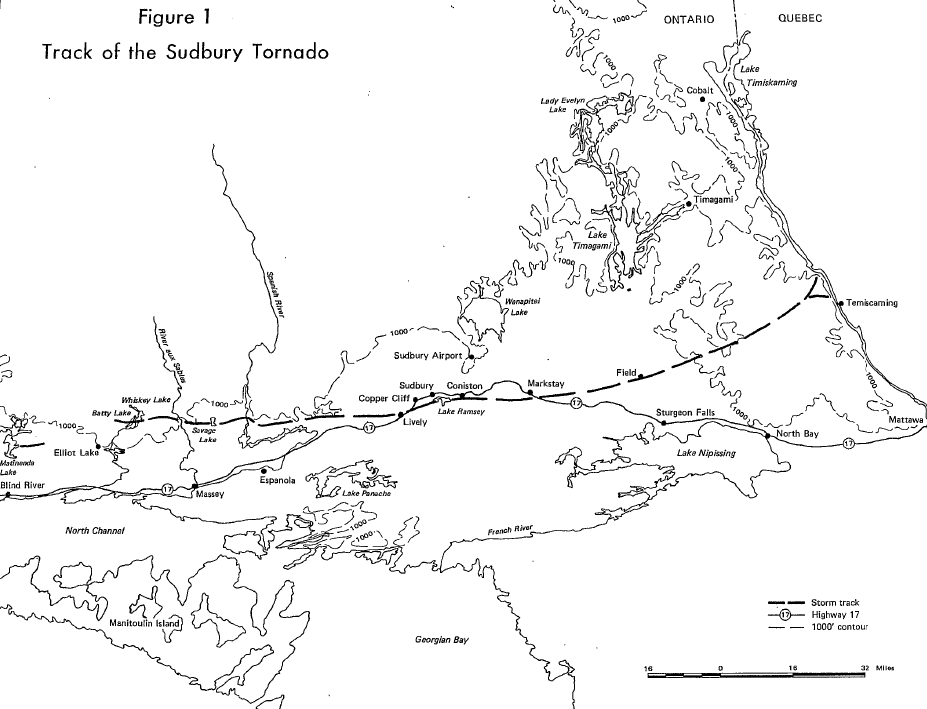
- Tornado track across Northeastern Ontario.

Meteorological history
- Date: August 20, 1970

F3 tornado
- on the Fujita scale
- Highest winds: ~254 km/h (158 mph)

Overall effects
- Fatalities: 6
- Injuries: 200
- Damage: CA$17 million (1970 CAD)
- Areas affected: Sudbury, Ontario, Canada
- Part of the Tornadoes of 1970

On August 20, 1970, a destructive tornado impacted the Canadian city of Sudbury, Ontario, killing six people and injuring 200 more in what became known as the Sudbury tornado. The tornado, which received a rating of F3 on the Fujita Scale, extensively damaged Sudbury and inflicted an estimated CA$17 million (1970 CAD) to the area. As of 2025, the tornado is the ninth deadliest in Canadian history.

== Tornado summary ==
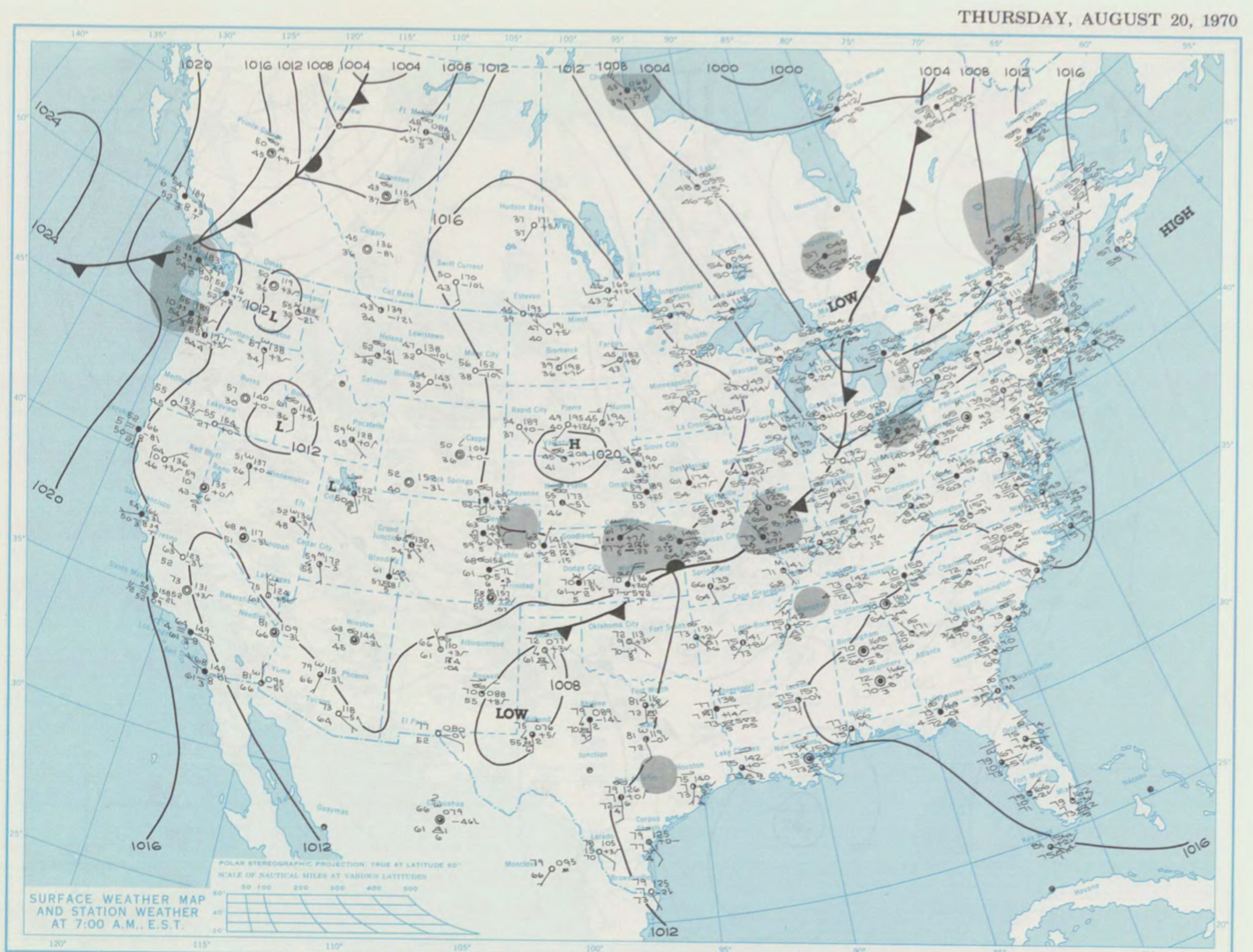
US Weather Bureau map on the morning of the events showing an active cold over the Great Lakes.

On the morning of August 20, a thunderstorm complex formed over eastern Lake Superior and the Upper Peninsula of Michigan ahead of a frontal trough. It moved eastward over Georgian Bay and Lake Huron and then weakened. However, a storm cell within this complex gained unusual intensity near Elliot Lake. The tornado first touched down just west of that city in the wooded area of Matinenda Lake, according to a Canadian weather service report.

The tornado continued through forested areas and then touched the nearby town of Lively sometimes after 8 am EDT, tracking quickly eastward into the city and then hit the town of Copper Cliff and Sudbury's neighborhoods of Robinson and Lockerby over the next ten minutes. The tornado then hit the community of Field, approximately 70 kilometres east of Sudbury, less than an hour later and dissipated north of Temiscaming, Quebec, according to the report. The tornado corridor was 200 to 400 m wide in Sudbury area and its total length reached 275 km.

The storm complex continued through North Bay and uprooted some trees in the wilderness but avoided any damage to the city. It then tracked southeasterly toward Ottawa, which led the federal government to order a precautionary shutdown of its offices in the capital, but the storm weakened around Chalk River and only a few millimetres of rain fell on Ottawa when it reached that city.

Residents of the region had little warning of the storm, as the Sudbury Airport did not yet have weather radar capable of detecting tornado rotation signal in the 1970's, and the day's only weather forecast had been for "showers." The first public indication of the tornado was instead a phone call to CKSO from a woman frantically reporting that her house was blowing away.

== Aftermath ==
Both Joe Fabbro, the mayor of Sudbury, and Len Turner, the mayor of Lively, declared their respective communities disaster areas. Both the federal and the provincial governments immediately sent representatives to the city to assist, including provincial Attorney General Arthur Wishart, provincial Municipal Affairs Minister Darcy McKeough and federal Housing Minister Robert Andras. With the company's operations temporarily disabled in the aftermath of the storm, Inco reassigned its employees to assist in rebuilding homes in Lively, which was then a company town in which most homes were owned by Inco, rather than by private homeowners. In Sudbury, a $2 million relief fund was quickly set up by Sudbury City Council.

Despite the extent of the damage, however, many meteorologists initially resisted classifying the storm as a tornado; although the pattern of damage was consistent with tornadic activity, there were no confirmed reports of a visible funnel cloud. Although it is now generally understood that a tornado can occur without an identifiable funnel in certain weather conditions, that was not as widely accepted in the 1970s. It was not until 1972 that the Canada Atmospheric Environment Service published a final report confirming that a tornado had indeed taken place.

Six people died and 200 were injured in the tornado, which caused an estimated $17 million in 1970 (which is about $137.5 million in 2025) in damage, including to Inco's copper smelter in Copper Cliff. A pipeline carrying iron-nickel concentrate to the plant collapsed onto a train track below and caissed a derailment when a train hit the collapsed pipe. The incident resulted in only minor injuries. The Inco Superstack, then under construction, swayed in the storm but was not heavily damaged. Six workers were on the construction platform at the time, all of whom survived.

Minor damage was also reported to the Big Nickel, with some pitting of the stainless steel panels as rocks and debris hit the monument, although that structure also survived. Damage was also reported to Memorial Hospital; Glad Tidings Tabernacle; and over 300 homes in Lively, Sudbury, and Field. Some streets in the affected neighbourhoods were flooded by up to a foot of water, and electrical and communications infrastructure was heavily damaged. For several days after the storm, amateur radio remained the only reliable method of communication into and out of the city. In Field, a lumber mill, which was the town's primary employer, was heavily damaged, and a church roof was ripped off just minutes after parishioners had left the building after the end of the morning mass.

== See also ==
- List of tornadoes and tornado outbreaks
- List of North American tornadoes and tornado outbreaks
- List of Canadian tornadoes
