= Mountbatten 76A =

- Indian reserve
- Mountbatten Indian Reserve No. 76A
- Location within Ontario
- Coordinates: 47°43′N 83°03′W
- Country: Canada
- Province: Ontario
- District: Sudbury
- First Nation: Brunswick House

Area
  - Land: 90.54 km^{2} (34.96 sq mi)

Mountbatten 76A is a First Nations reserve near Kinogama in Sudbury District, Ontario. It is one of two reserves of the Brunswick House First Nation.
