= Harry Bain =

Canadian pediatrician (1921-2001)

Harry William Bain
- Born: 1921; Cache Bay, Ontario
- Died: December 21, 2001 (aged 80); North Bay, Ontario
- Occupation: pediatrician
- Awards: Order of Canada

Harry William Bain, OC (1921 – December 21, 2001) was a Canadian pediatrician.

He was raised in Cache Bay, Ontario, and graduated from the University of Toronto in 1944. He was a paediatrician at Toronto's Hospital for Sick Children from 1951 to 1985. From 1966 to 1976, he was the Paediatrician-in-Chief of the Hospital for Sick Children and the University of Toronto's Department Chairman of Paediatrics.

In 1969, he helped to start the University of Toronto Sioux Lookout Project, a health-care program which helped over 15,000 Cree and Ojibwa people in Northern Ontario. He was the Director for 17 years.

== Honours ==
- In 1986, the University of Toronto awarded him a Doctor of Laws, honoris causa.
- In 1987, he was made an Officer of the Order of Canada for his "compassionate devotion to health care, especially to that of children and the Native people of Northern Ontario, has made him one of the most respected paediatricians in the country".
- In 1992, he was awarded the 125th Anniversary of the Confederation of Canada Medal.
- In 1998, he was awarded the Canadian Medical Association's highest honour, the F.N.G. Starr Award.
