= Northeastern Ontario =

Northeastern Ontario _{Nord-est de l'Ontario (French)}
- Secondary region
- ██ Core area ██ Extended area
- Coordinates: 48°00′N 81°45′W
- Country: Canada
- Province: Ontario

Area
  - Total: 280,290.16 km^{2} (108,220.64 sq mi)

Population (2021)
  - Total: 509,771
  - Density: 1.96/km^{2} (5.1/sq mi)
- Largest city: Greater Sudbury; 166,004 (2021)

Northeastern Ontario is a secondary region of Northern Ontario in the Canadian province of Ontario, which lies north of Lake Huron and east of Lake Superior. Greater Sudbury is its largest settlement.

Northeastern Ontario consists of the districts of Algoma, Sudbury, Cochrane, Timiskaming, Nipissing and Manitoulin. For some purposes, Parry Sound District and Muskoka District Municipality are treated as part of Northeastern Ontario although they are geographically in Central Ontario. These two divisions are coloured in green on the map.

Northeastern Ontario and Northwestern Ontario may also be grouped together as Northern Ontario. An important difference between the two sub-regions is that Northeastern Ontario has a sizable Franco-Ontarian population — approximately 25 per cent of the region's population speaks French as a first language, compared with 3.2 per cent in the northwest. Virtually the entire region, except only the Manitoulin District, is designated as a French-language service area under Ontario's French Language Services Act. In the northwest, by contrast, only a few standalone municipalities are so designated.

In 2023, the Northeastern Ontario Tourism agency launched a social media marketing campaign, branding the region as "The Seven" in reference to the 705 telephone area code and the common nickname of Toronto as "The Six".

== Municipalities ==
=== Cities ===
There are six cities in Northeastern Ontario. They are, in alphabetical order:

City	Population (2021)	District	Ref.
Elliot Lake	11,372	Algoma District	
Greater Sudbury	166,004	Greater Sudbury	
North Bay	52,662	Nipissing District	
Sault Ste. Marie	72,051	Algoma District	
Temiskaming Shores	9,634	Timiskaming District	
Timmins	41,145	Cochrane District	

=== Towns ===
The towns in Northeastern Ontario, listed in alphabetical order, include:

Town	Population (2021)	District	Ref.	Town	Population	District	Ref.
Blind River	3,620	Algoma District		Kirkland Lake	7,750	Timiskaming District	
Bruce Mines	582	Algoma District		Latchford	355	Timiskaming District	
Chapleau	1,942	Sudbury District		Markstay-Warren	2,708	Sudbury District	
Cobalt	989	Timiskaming District		Mattawa	1,881	Nipissing District	
Cochrane	5,390	Cochrane District		Moosonee	1,512	Cochrane District	
Englehart	1,442	Timiskaming District		Smooth Rock Falls	1,200	Cochrane District	
Espanola	5,185	Sudbury District		Spanish	670	Algoma District	
French River	2,828	Sudbury District		St. Charles	1,357	Sudbury District	
Hearst	4,794	Cochrane District		Thessalon	1,260	Algoma District	
Iroquois Falls	4,418	Cochrane District		Temagami	862	Nipissing District	
Kapuskasing	8,057	Cochrane District					

== Transportation ==
The region is served by several branches of the Trans-Canada Highway, including Highway 11, Highway 17, Highway 66 and Highway 69. Several other highways in the region are part of the provincial highway system, but not the national Trans-Canada Highway.

The only freeways in the region are a portion of Highway 17 in the Walden district of Greater Sudbury, and Highway 69 between Greater Sudbury and the French River. The remainder of Highway 69 is slated for conversion into a full freeway, and will be redesignated as part of Highway 400 when the construction is complete. The provincial government also has plans on file for the eventual conversion of Highway 17 to freeway from Sault Ste. Marie easterly toward Ottawa, although no timetable for this project has been announced as of 2026 except for the conversion of Highway 17's Southwest and Southeast Bypasses route through Sudbury near the completion of the Highway 69/400 project.

== Population ==
Population of Northeastern Ontario
District	2021	±	2016	±	2011	±	2006	±	2001	±	1996
Northeastern Ontario	509,771	0.8%	505,625	-0.7%	508,982	-0.3%	510,326	-3.3%	512,007	-5.6%	542,248
Algoma District	113,777	-0.3%	114,094	-1.5%	115,870	-1.4%	117,461	-0.9%	118,567	-5.5%	125,455
Cochrane District	77,963	-2.2%	79,682	-1.8%	81,122	-1.7%	82,503 †	-3.2%	85,247	-8.6%	93,240
Greater Sudbury (including enclaved Wahnapitae First Nations reserve)	166,128	2.8%	161,647	0.8%	160,376	1.6%	157,909	1.7%	155,268	-6.1%	165,336
Manitoulin District	13,935	5.1%	13,255	1.6%	13,048	-0.3%	13,090	3.2%	12,679	7.9%	11,747
Nipissing District	84,176	1.9%	83,150	-1.9%	84,736	0.1%	84,688 †	2.1%	82,910	-2.3%	84,832
Sudbury District	22,368	3.8%	21,546	1.7%	21,196	-3.0%	21,392	-6.6%	22,894	-3.9%	23,831
Timiskaming District	31,424	-2.6%	32,251	-1.2%	32,634	-1.9%	33,283	-3.4%	34,442	-8.9%	37,807

== Provincial parks ==
- List of Ontario provincial parks in Northeastern Ontario
