= Cache Bay, Ontario =

Community in Nipissing District, Ontario, Canada

Cache Bay
- Unincorporated community
- Location in Ontario
- Coordinates: 46°22′24″N 79°59′23″W
- Country: Canada
- Province: Ontario
- District: Nipissing
- Municipality: West Nipissing
- Settled: 1884
- Incorporated: 1903
- Dissolved (amalgamated): January 1, 1999

Government
  - Fed. riding: Sudbury East—Manitoulin—Nickel Belt
  - Prov. riding: Timiskaming—Cochrane

Area
  - Land: 2.85 km^{2} (1.10 sq mi)
- Elevation: 209 m (686 ft)

Population (2021)
  - Total: 658
  - Density: 230.7/km^{2} (598/sq mi)
- Time zone: UTC-5 (EST)
  - Summer (DST): UTC-4 (EDT)
- Postal code: P0H 1G0
- Area codes: 705, 249, 683

Cache Bay is an unincorporated community in geographic Springer Township in the municipality of West Nipissing, Nipissing District, Ontario, Canada. It is recognized as a designated place by Statistics Canada and is located on the eponymous bay on the north shore of Lake Nipissing.

== History ==
In 1883, the Canadian Pacific Railway, with station at Cache Bay, was built and opened the area to logging. The lumber company Barnett & Mackie stored equipment and supplies at the bay so that it became known as Cache Bay. This company also built an office and housing at Cache Bay in 1884. It was acquired, along with all the lumber rights in the area, by John Rudolphus Booth, who then sold lots in Cache Bay to his employees. At that time it was known as Booth's Depot. In 1889, the Davidson & Hay Company built a large sawmill and its post office opened. Around the same time, the road to Sturgeon Falls was completed.

In 1901, a fire at the sawmill spread to the village and destroyed 30 buildings, leaving 200 people homeless. In 1903, the village of Cache Bay was incorporated, with A.J. Young as its first mayor. By 1905, there were 178 buildings in the village, including 2 general stores, 2 blacksmith shops, a billiard hall, a doctor's office, a pharmacy, a community hall, a public school, 2 barbershops, a butcher shop, 2 rooming houses, and 2 churches.

In 1965, the mill, then owned by the George Gordon Lumber Company, ceased operations.

On January 1, 1999, the Towns of Cache Bay and Sturgeon Falls, the Townships of Caldwell and Field, along with the unorganized geographic township of Springer, were amalgamated in to the new Municipality of West Nipissing.

In 2016, Local author Nancy Payeur Published "The Cache Bay Tragedies" a true-crime and local history book examining two murders and two armed robberies that occurred in Cache Bay between 1961 and 1964. One of the principal cases discussed is the unsolved 1963 killing of Lionel Sabourin, Commonly Known as the "Dog Chain Murder"

== Demographics ==
In the 2021 Census of Population conducted by Statistics Canada, Cache Bay had a population of 658 living in 268 of its 274 total private dwellings, a change of 2.7% from its 2016 population of 641. With a land area of 2.85 km^{2} (1.10 sq mi), it had a population density of 230.9/km^{2} (598.0/sq mi) in 2021.

Historical census populations – Cache Bay

Year	Pop.	±%
1911	889	—
1921	926	+4.2%
1931	1,151	+24.3%
1941	1,004	−12.8%
1951	845	−15.8%
1956	894	+5.8%
1961	810	−9.4%

Year	Pop.	±%
1966	651	−19.6%
1971	727	+11.7%
1976	691	−5.0%
1981	665	−3.8%
1986	689	+3.6%
1991	712	+3.3%
1996	648	−9.0%

Year	Pop.	±%
2001	611	−5.7%
2006	561	−8.2%
2011	643	+14.6%
2016	641	−0.3%
2021	658	+2.7%

Population counts are not adjusted for boundary changes.
Source: Statistics Canada

== Transportation ==
The community is served by Ontario Highway 17.

== See also ==
- List of communities in Ontario
- List of designated places in Ontario
