= Field, Ontario =

Community in West Nipissing, Ontario, Canada

Field
- Community
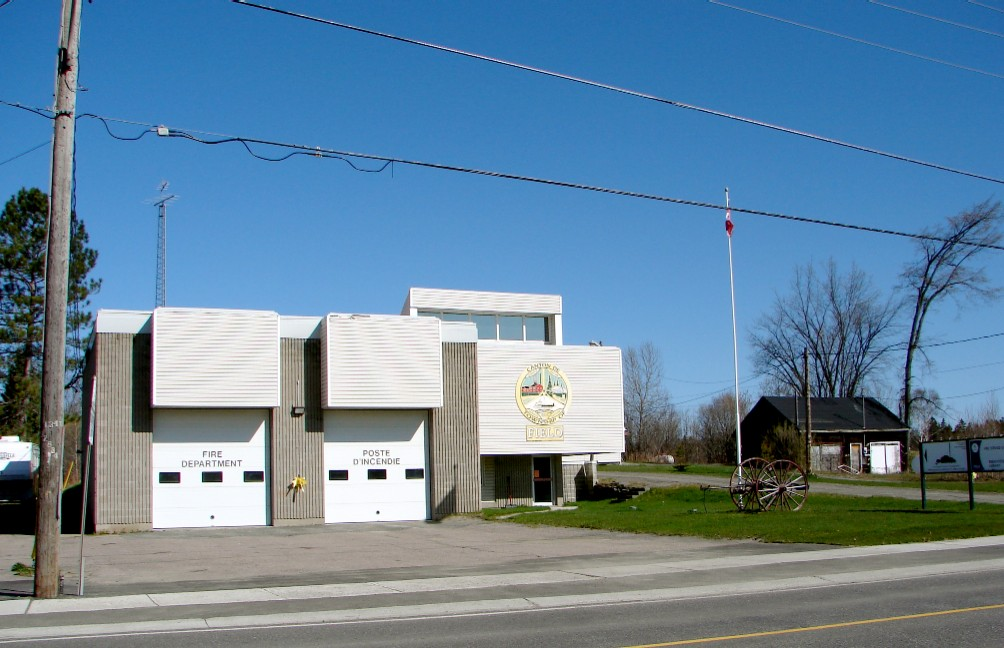

- Location within Ontario
- Coordinates: 46°31′24″N 80°01′33″W
- Country: Canada
- Province: Ontario
- District: Nipissing
- Municipality: West Nipissing

Population (1979)
  - Total: 750
  - Estimate (2019): <375

Field is a community in Nipissing District, Ontario, located in the municipality of West Nipissing. The community is located on Highway 64, approximately 20 kilometres north of Sturgeon Falls. The community was initially built on logging and farming, but has become an outdoor sports centre with its recreational activities as the main village industry. The community is named after Canadian politician Corelli Collard Field.

The area has been the site of many natural disasters. Notably, in the spring of 1979, the Sturgeon River overflowed the banks of Field, causing massive flooding in the community centre. Many houses were demolished and rebuilt on higher ground nearby.

Every July, Field is the site of the annual River & Sky Music / Camping Festival.

== History ==
=== Development ===
After logging began in the Field area of around 1886, small logging populations would relocate to the area, building the community. A log church was built in 1879, with the town's first post office being built soon after. With the community's railway launching construction in 1912, the town would become more accessible, with the first train coming to Field in 1915. However, in 1995, the Canadian National Railway deactivated all lines in the area, rendering the railway abandoned.

=== Natural disasters ===
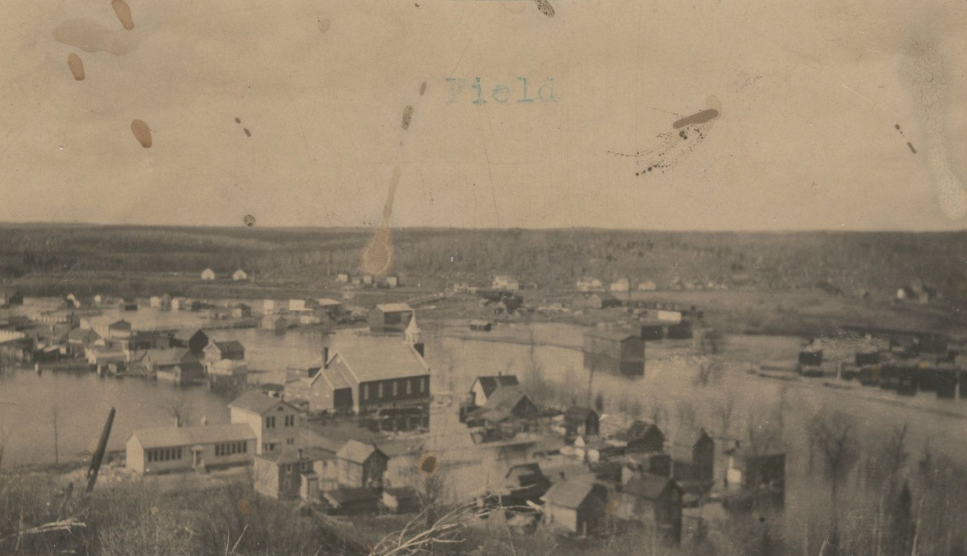
Field photographed in 1928 following its first known flood.

The first known natural disaster in Field occurred in 1928 when a major flood damaged the town. Floods would continue in the 1950s.

In the summer of 1970, a tornado associated with the Sudbury tornado event injured several residents and killed one. Over $500,000 CAD was spent to repair the town.

In 1979, the Sturgeon River rose twenty feet and flooded most of the village. On some nights, the river would rise by as much as a foot. Several hundred residents were forced to relocate to the community's now defunct elementary school, where volunteers would cook meals. At the expense of the provincial Government of Ontario, many homes on lower ground were relocated to higher ground in the community's Val des Arbes neighbourhood, with compensation for their property loss. The majority of Field's residents still live in Val des Arbes today. Following the flood, many people permanently left the community and the majority of businesses did not reopen. Today, the population is estimated to be less than half of what it was before the flood in 1979.
