= Markstay-Warren =

- Municipality (single-tier)
- Municipality of Markstay-Warren
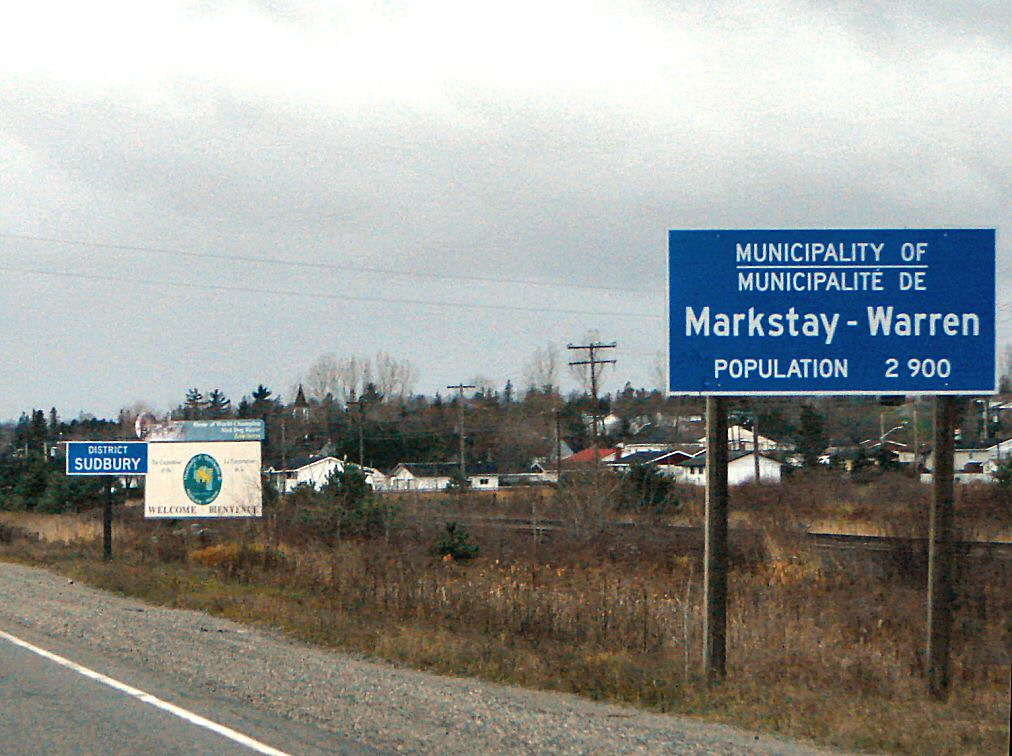
- Entering Markstay-Warren on Highway 17 westbound at Warren

- Location within Ontario
- Coordinates: 46°30′N 80°30′W
- Country: Canada
- Province: Ontario
- District: Sudbury
- Incorporated: 1999

Government
  - Type: Town
  - Mayor: Steve Olson
  - Governing Body: Markstay-Warren Town Council
  - MP: Jim Belanger (Conservative)
  - MPP: John Vanthof (NDP)

Area
  - Total: 505.92 km^{2} (195.34 sq mi)

Population (2021)
  - Total: 2,708
  - Density: 5.4/km^{2} (14/sq mi)
- Time zone: UTC-5 (EST)
  - Summer (DST): UTC-4 (EDT)
- Area code: 705
- Highways: Highway 17 / TCH; Highway 535; Highway 539
- Website: www.markstay-warren.ca/index.htm

Markstay-Warren is a town in the Canadian province of Ontario, located in the Sudbury District. Highway 17, from the city limits of Greater Sudbury to the Sudbury District's border with Nipissing District, lies entirely within Markstay-Warren. The town had a population of 2,708 in the 2021 Canadian census.

The town was created on January 1, 1999, by the amalgamation of the incorporated Townships of Ratter and Dunnet and Hagar, the geographic township of Awrey, and parts of the geographic townships of Hawley, Henry, Loughrin, and Street. Along with the municipalities of St. Charles and French River, it is part of the region known as Sudbury East.

In the 2016 Canadian census, Markstay-Warren was added for the first time to Greater Sudbury's census metropolitan area.

== Communities ==
The town includes the communities of Appleby Corner, Callum, Dunnet Corner, Hagar, Markstay, Rivière-Veuve, Stinson and Warren. Markstay is the location of the town's municipal offices.

Stinson, Callum, Hagar and Warren are all located directly on Highway 17, a branch of the Trans-Canada Highway. Appleby Corner is located south of Hagar on Highway 535. The other communities are all located along local roads that branch off from one of these two highways. In 2010, planning commenced on a future extension of Highway 17's freeway alignment in Sudbury, which will eventually see the freeway's eastern terminus located near Main Street into Markstay.

Communities in Markstay-Warren

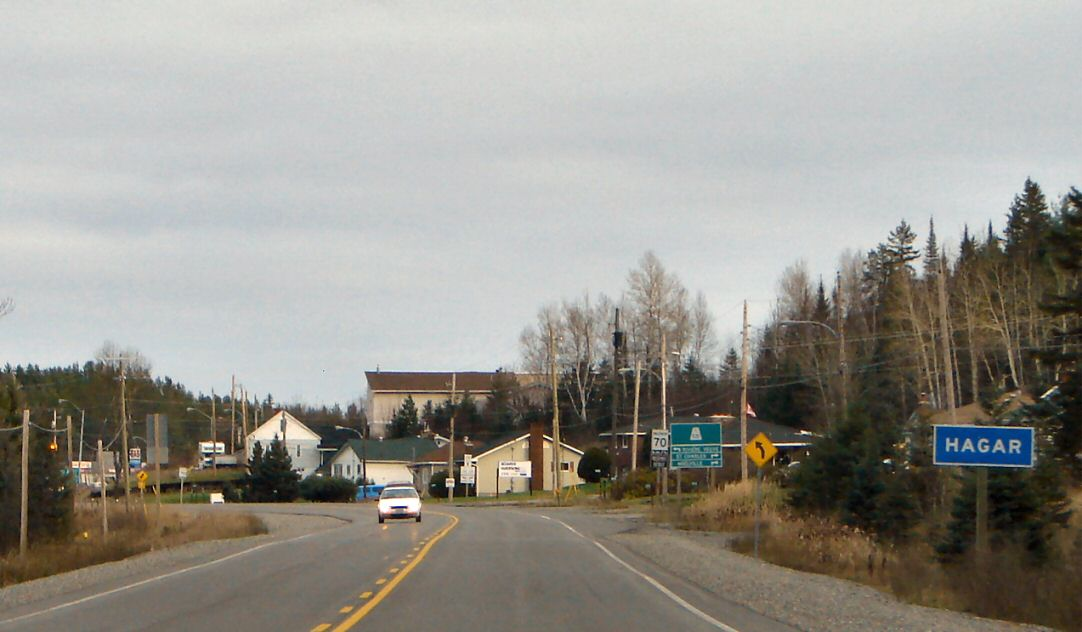
Hagar
46°27′20″N 80°25′00″W

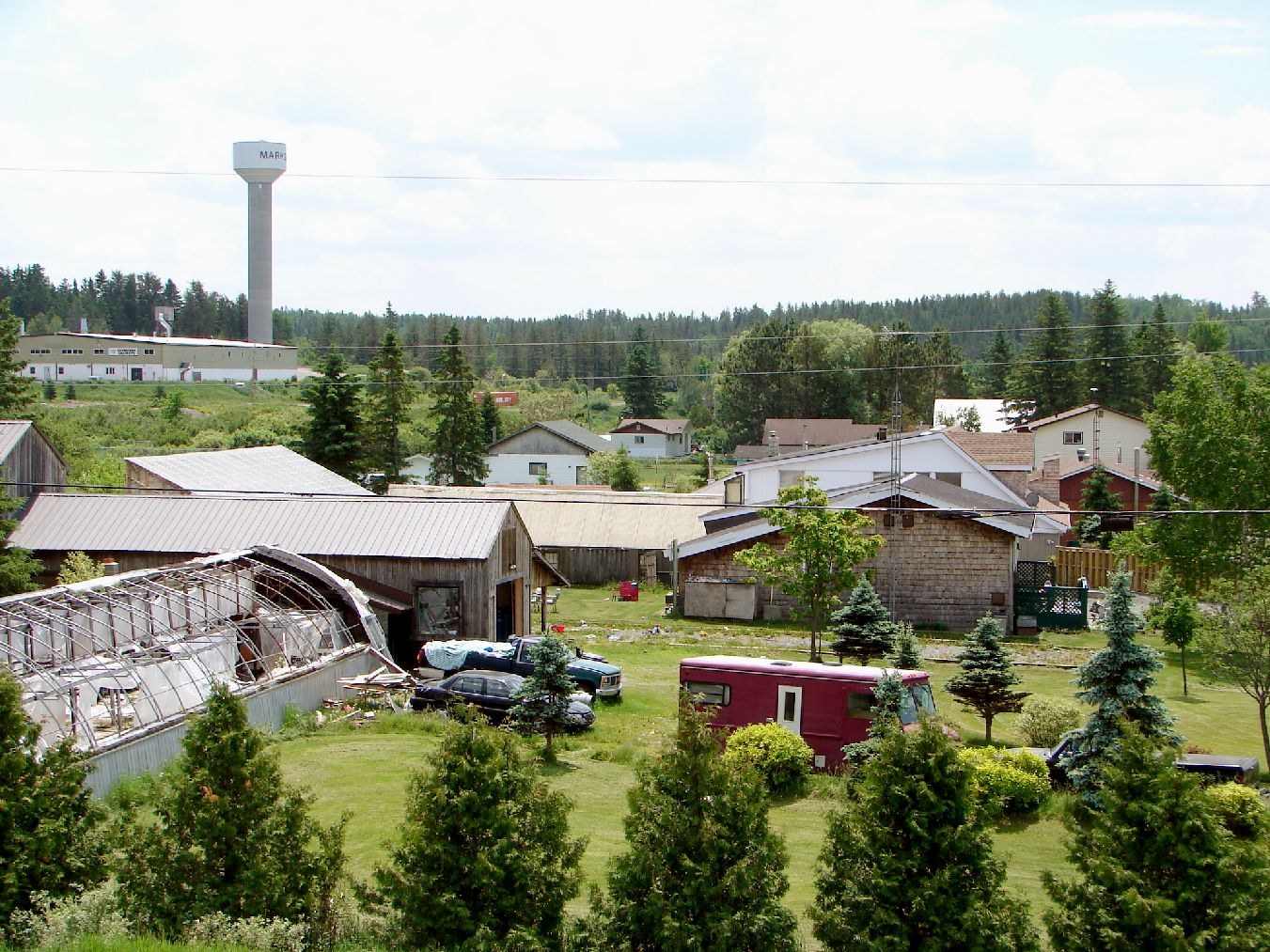
Markstay
46°29′30″N 80°32′30″W

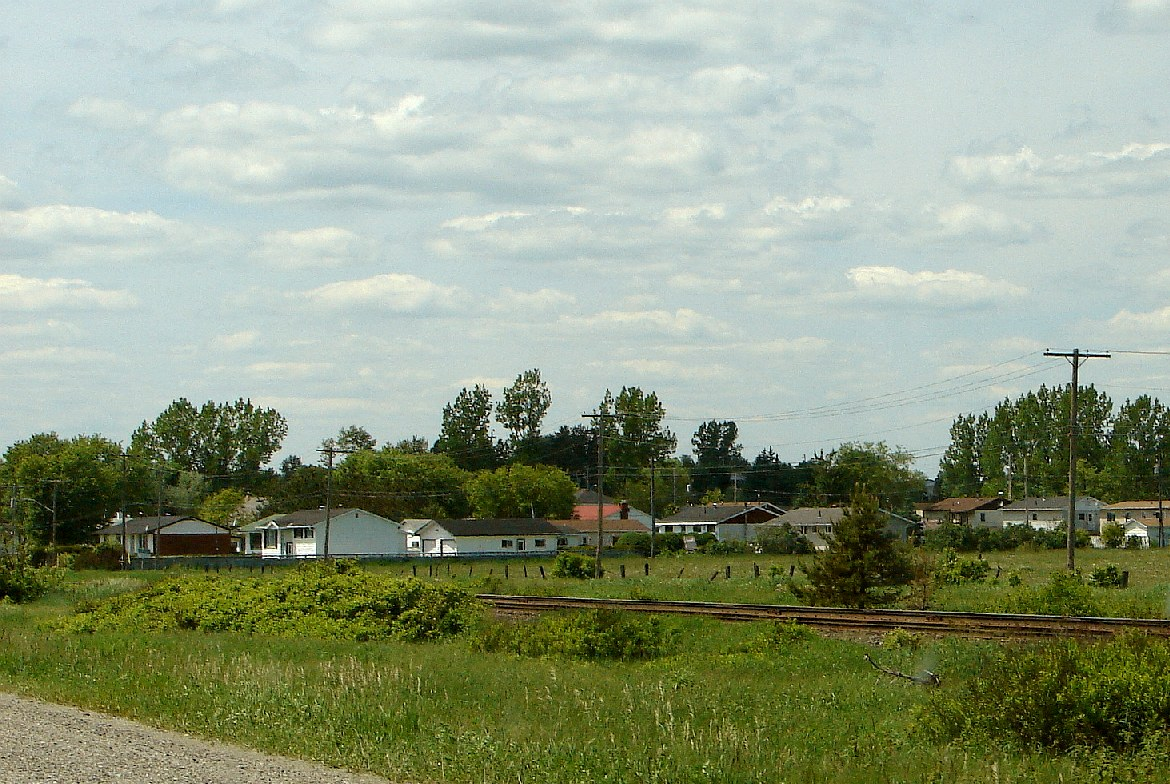
Warren
46°26′30″N 80°18′30″W

== History ==
Much of the area owes its existence to the Canadian Pacific Railway. Most settlers were French-Canadian Roman Catholics who came by rail from the province of Quebec.

Shortly after the completion of the transcontinental line of the CPR in 1885, a station and community was established at Rivière-Veuve, taking its name from the Veuve River that flows through this area. In 1890, the Warren family of Toronto established a sawmill, slightly east of Rivière-Veuve, operating under the name Imperial Lumber Company. A standard gauge logging railroad was also constructed to bring logs to the mill.

In the first part of the 20th century, lumber and agriculture were the main economic activities in the area. By the 1960s, Warren's population and economy grew steadily and because of its proximity (60 km) to Sudbury, many area residents were employed in the mines of the Sudbury area. By the 1970s, important local employers included Ontario Hydro and the Ontario Provincial Police.

The economic recession of the early 1990s hit the Warren area significantly hard as corporate restructuring and downsizing at Ontario Hydro and the OPP resulted in the closure of the Ontario Hydro office and reductions in staff at the OPP. As a consequence, Warren's population suffered and many residents moved to larger centres such as Sudbury or North Bay.

== Demographics ==
In the 2021 Census of Population conducted by Statistics Canada, Markstay-Warren had a population of 2,708 living in 1,109 of its 1,199 total private dwellings, a change of 2% from its 2016 population of 2,656. With a land area of 505.92 km^{2} (195.34 sq mi), it had a population density of 5.4/km^{2} (13.9/sq mi) in 2021.

Canada census – Markstay-Warren community profile

	2021	2016	2011
Population	2,708 (+2.0% from 2016)	2,656 (+15.6% from 2011)	2,297 (-7.2% from 2006)
Land area	505.92 km^{2} (195.34 sq mi)	512.78 km^{2} (197.99 sq mi)	513.1 km^{2} (198.1 sq mi)
Population density	5.4/km^{2} (14/sq mi)	5.2/km^{2} (13/sq mi)	4.5/km^{2} (12/sq mi)
Median age	45.2 (M: 45.2, F: 45.2)	46.9 (M: 46.2, F: 48.1)	47.0 (M: 47.0, F: 46.9)
Private dwellings	1,199 (total) 1,109 (occupied)	1,276 (total)	1,182 (total)
Median household income	$82,000	$68,147

References: 2021 2016 2011

Historical census populations – Markstay-Warren
Year	Pop.	±%
2001	2,627	—
2006	2,475	−5.8%
2011	2,297	−7.2%
2016	2,656	+15.6%
2021	2,708	+2.0%

== See also ==
- List of townships in Ontario
- List of francophone communities in Ontario
