= St. Charles, Ontario =

St. Charles
- Municipality (single-tier)
- Municipality of St. Charles; Municipalité de St-Charles
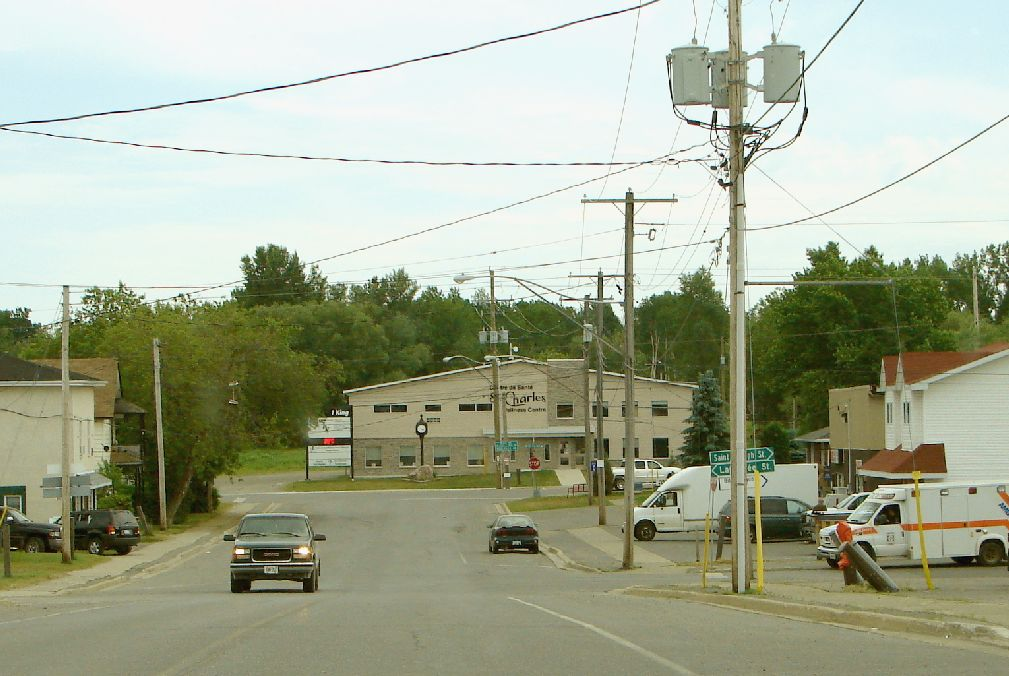
- Motto: Fides Virtus Fortitudo
- Location within Ontario
- Coordinates: 46°21′N 80°25′W
- Country: Canada
- Province: Ontario
- District: Sudbury
- Incorporated: January 1, 1999

Government
  - Type: Town
  - Mayor: Nathaniel Hefferman
  - Governing Body: St Charles Municipal Council
  - MP: Jim Belanger (Conservative)
  - MPP: John Vanthof (NDP)

Area
  - Land: 314.46 km^{2} (121.41 sq mi)

Population (2021)
  - Total: 1,357
  - Density: 4.3/km^{2} (11/sq mi)
- Time zone: UTC-5 (EST)
  - Summer (DST): UTC-4 (EDT)
- Area code: 705
- Website: www.stcharlesontario.ca

St. Charles is a town in the Canadian province of Ontario, located in the Sudbury District.

It was created on January 1, 1999, by the amalgamation of the incorporated townships of Casimir, Jennings, and Appleby, as well as a strip of unorganized territory on the West Arm of Lake Nipissing. Along with the municipalities of Markstay-Warren and French River, it is part of the region known as Sudbury East.

The town had a population of 1,357 in the 2021 Canadian census. Franco-Ontarians, or Ontarians who speak French as their mother tongue, make up 41% of the population.

In addition to the primary townsite of St. Charles (46°21′47″N 80°25′4″W), the municipality also includes the smaller communities of Casimir (46°20′11″N 80°25′35″W) and West Arm (46°15′40″N 80°25′54″W).

== Demographics ==
In the 2021 Census of Population conducted by Statistics Canada, St.-Charles had a population of 1,357 living in 621 of its 788 total private dwellings, a change of 6.9% from its 2016 population of 1,269. With a land area of 314.46 km^{2} (121.41 sq mi), it had a population density of 4.3/km^{2} (11.2/sq mi) in 2021.

Canada census – St. Charles, Ontario community profile

	2021	2016	2011
Population	1,357 (+6.9% from 2016)	1,269 (-1.0% from 2011)	1,282 (+10.6% from 2006)
Land area	314.46 km^{2} (121.41 sq mi)	321.75 km^{2} (124.23 sq mi)	321.54 km^{2} (124.15 sq mi)
Population density	4.3/km^{2} (11/sq mi)	3.9/km^{2} (10/sq mi)	4.0/km^{2} (10/sq mi)
Median age	55.6 (M: 55.6, F: 55.2)	53.5 (M: 53.3, F: 53.8)	48.7 (M: 48.4, F: 49.1)
Private dwellings	788 (total) 621 (occupied)	818 (total) 573 (occupied)	759 (total) 542 (occupied)
Median household income	$76,000	$57,280

References: 2021 2016 2011

Historical census populations – St. Charles, Ontario
Year	Pop.	±%
2001	1,245	—
2006	1,159	−6.9%
2011	1,282	+10.6%
2016	1,269	−1.0%
2021	1,357	+6.9%
Source: Statistics Canada

== See also ==
- List of townships in Ontario
- List of francophone communities in Ontario
