= Sudbury District =

Sudbury District District de Sudbury
- District
- Location of Sudbury District in Ontario
- Coordinates: 47°30′N 82°00′W
- Country: Canada
- Province: Ontario
- Region: Northeastern Ontario
- Created: 1907

Government
  - MPs: Jim Belanger, Gaétan Malette, Terry Sheehan
  - MPPs: France Gélinas, Bill Rosenberg, John Vanthof

Area
  - Land: 39,896.79 km^{2} (15,404.24 sq mi)

Population (2021)
  - Total: 22,368
  - Density: 0.6/km^{2} (1.6/sq mi)
- Time zone: UTC-5 (Eastern (EST))
  - Summer (DST): UTC-4 (EDT)
- Area code: 705
- Seat: Espanola

The Sudbury District is a district in Northeastern Ontario in the Canadian province of Ontario. It was created in 1894 from townships of eastern Algoma District and west Nipissing District. In 1973, the Regional Municipality of Sudbury was created as a separate jurisdiction out of the district.

The overwhelming majority of the district (about 92%) is unincorporated and part of Unorganized North Sudbury District. With the exception of Chapleau, all of the district's incorporated municipalities are found in the area immediately surrounding the city of Greater Sudbury to the west, east and south. North of the Greater Sudbury area, the district is sparsely populated; between Sudbury and Chapleau, only unincorporated settlements, ghost towns and small First Nations reserves are found.

== Status of Greater Sudbury ==
Because the districts of Northern Ontario are unincorporated territorial divisions, unlike the counties or regional municipalities of Southern Ontario, the city of Greater Sudbury is legally defined as part of the district in the geographic sense.

Politically, however, the district and the city are considered two distinct census divisions and two distinct jurisdictions for provincial government services. The district's social services board—which has offices in the district seat of Espanola, as well as satellite offices in several other communities in the district—instead shares its jurisdictional area with the neighbouring Manitoulin District, whereas equivalent services in Greater Sudbury, which has the status of a single-tier municipality, are provided directly from the city.

With the city included, the district would have had a population of 183,077 in the 2016 census.

== Subdivisions ==
Towns:

- Espanola
- French River
- Markstay-Warren
- St. Charles

Townships:

- Baldwin
- Chapleau
- Killarney
- Nairn and Hyman
- Sables-Spanish Rivers

Unorganized areas:

- Sudbury, Unorganized, North Part - Local services areas include:
  - Cartier
  - Foleyet
  - Gogama
  - Rainbow Country

=== First Nations reserves ===
- Chapleau 74A
- Chapleau 75
- Duck Lake
- Mattagami
- Mountbatten
- Whitefish Lake
- Whitefish River (boundaries include parts of both Sudbury and Manitoulin Districts)

== Demographics ==
As a census division in the 2021 Census of Population conducted by Statistics Canada, the Sudbury District had a population of 22,368 living in 9,915 of its 13,453 total private dwellings, a change of 3.8% from its 2016 population of 21,546. With a land area of 39,896.79 km^{2} (15,404.24 sq mi), it had a population density of 0.6/km^{2} (1.5/sq mi) in 2021.

Canada census – Sudbury District community profile

	2021	2016	2011
Population	22,368 (+3.8% from 2016)	21,546 (+1.7% from 2011)	21,196 (−3.0% from 2006)
Land area	39,896.79 km^{2} (15,404.24 sq mi)	40,204.77 km^{2} (15,523.15 sq mi)	40,205.41 km^{2} (15,523.40 sq mi)
Population density	0.6/km^{2} (1.6/sq mi)	0.5/km^{2} (1.3/sq mi)	0.5/km^{2} (1.3/sq mi)
Median age	51.6 (M: 51.6, F: 51.6)	50.4 (M: 50.6, F: 50.3)
Private dwellings	13,453 (total) 9,915 (occupied)	12,557 (total) 9,375 (occupied)	11,918 (total)
Median household income	$76,000	$65,333

References: 2021 2016 2011

Historical census populations – Sudbury District

Year	Pop.	±%
1921	43,029	—
1931	58,251	+35.4%
1941	80,815	+38.7%
1951	109,590	+35.6%
1956	141,975	+29.6%
1961	165,862	+16.8%

Year	Pop.	±%
1966	174,102	+5.0%
1971	198,079	+13.8%
1976	27,287	−86.2%
1981	27,068	−0.8%
1986	25,771	−4.8%
1991	26,178	+1.6%

Year	Pop.	±%
1996	25,457	−2.8%
2001	22,894	−10.1%
2006	21,392	−6.6%
2011	21,196	−0.9%
2016	21,546	+1.7%
2021	22,368	+3.8%

Population counts are not adjusted for boundary changes. Population amounts after 1973 exclude Regional Municipality of Sudbury/Greater Sudbury.
Source: Statistics Canada

== Provincial highways ==
The Sudbury District is served by Trans-Canada Highways 17, which leads from the community of Walford (Sables-Spanish Rivers) in the west to the community of Warren (Markstay-Warren) in the east, and 69, which enters the district at French River and exits at the southern boundary of Greater Sudbury.

The Ontario government is converting Highway 69 to a freeway. Virtually the entire route of Highway 69 within the Sudbury District is now four-laned as of December 2021, with the completion of the segment between the French River and Grundy Lake Provincial Park, while the route narrows back to a two-lane highway in the Parry Sound District until widening back into Highway 400 at Carling. The freeway conversion of the remaining route, and its eventual renumbering as an extension of Highway 400, are expected in the future, although no exact date has been confirmed as of 2022 for the completion of the project.

Other primary provincial highways in the district are:

- Highway 6, which extends from Highway 17 south to Whitefish Falls, where it enters the Manitoulin District,
- Highway 64, which runs from Highway 69 east and north through the Municipality of French River, and enters the Nipissing District at Mashkinonje Provincial Park,
- Highway 101, which extends from the boundary of Algoma District, west of Chapleau, to the boundary of Cochrane District, just outside Timmins,
- Highway 129, which runs from Highway 101 to the boundary of Algoma District south of Chapleau,
- Highway 144, which runs from the northwestern city limits of Greater Sudbury north to the boundary of Timiskaming District, just outside Timmins.

The Sudbury District also has a number of secondary provincial highways, which are the analogue in a district to county or municipal roads in Southern Ontario. They are important connections to the communities they serve, but are not significant routes for through traffic. The secondary highways are:

- Highway 528, connecting the community of Wolseley Bay (French River) to Highway 64,
- Highway 528A, which provides access to the south side of the water body at Wolseley Bay,
- Highway 535, connecting Highway 64 at Noëlville (French River) to Highway 17 at Hagar (St. Charles),
- Highway 553, extending north from the community of Massey (Sables-Spanish Rivers),
- Highway 560, which runs from Highway 144 to the boundary of Timiskaming District, through Shining Tree,
- Highway 560A, which connects Westree to Highway 560,
- Highway 607, which runs from Bigwood (French River) to Highway 64,
- Highway 607A, which provides road access to the French River,
- Highway 637, which runs from Highway 69 to the community of Killarney,
- Highway 661, which connects the community of Gogama to Highway 144.

See also Sultan Industrial Road.

== See also ==
- List of townships in Ontario
- List of secondary schools in Ontario#Sudbury District
