= French River, Ontario =

French River
- Municipality (single-tier)
- Municipality of French River; Municipalité de Rivière des Français
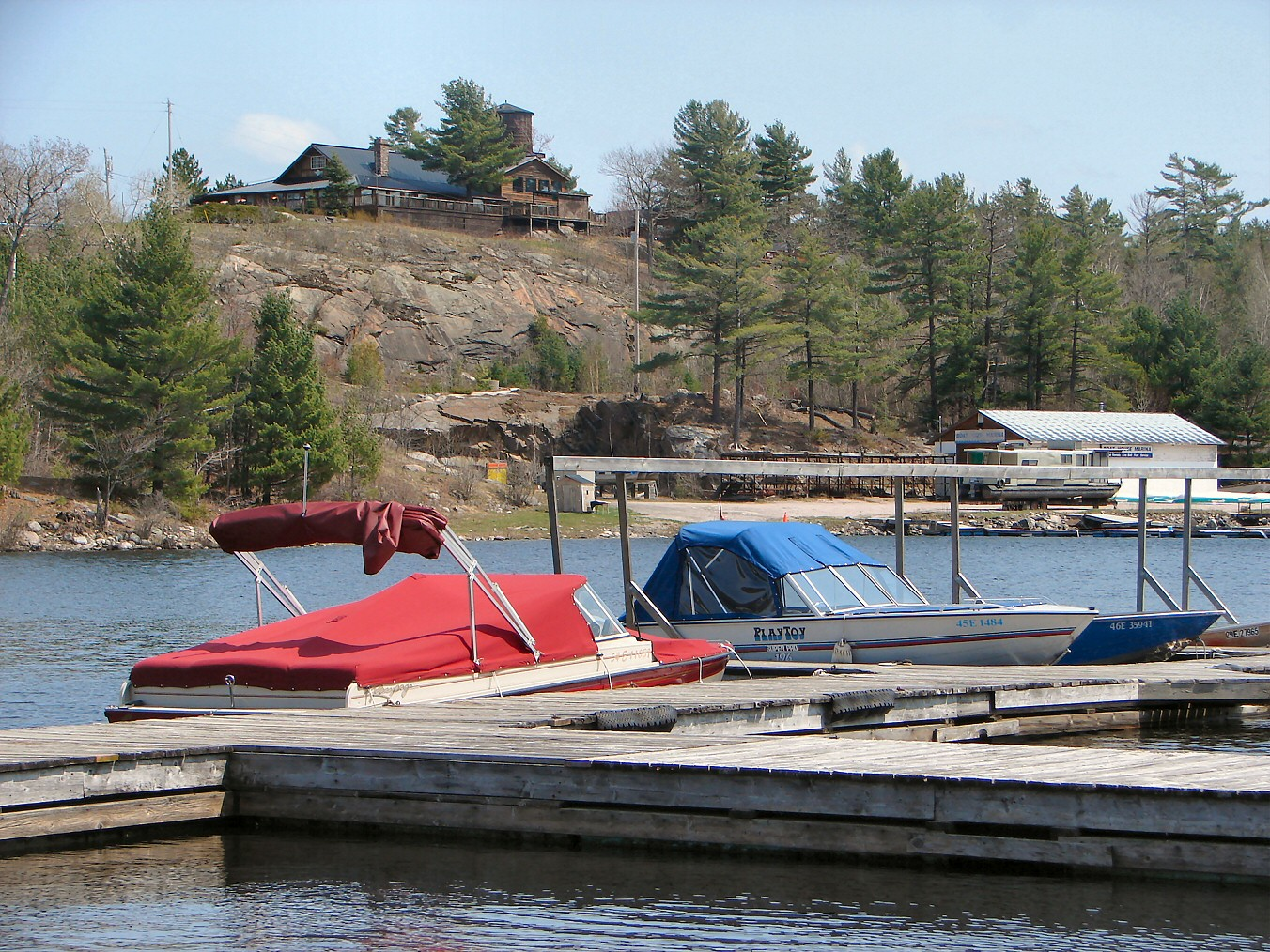
- The French River at the French River Post

- Location within Ontario
- Coordinates: 46°10′N 80°30′W
- Country: Canada
- Province: Ontario
- District: Sudbury
- Incorporated: January 1, 1999

Government
  - Type: Town
  - Mayor: Gisèle Pageau
  - Governing Body: French River Municipal Council
  - MP: Jim Belanger (Conservative)
  - MPP: France Gélinas (NDP); John Vanthof (NDP)

Area
  - Land: 717.91 km^{2} (277.19 sq mi)

Population (2021)
  - Total: 2,828
  - Density: 3.9/km^{2} (10/sq mi)
- Time zone: UTC-5 (EST)
  - Summer (DST): UTC-4 (EDT)
- Area code: 705
- Website: www.frenchriver.ca

French River, also known by the French equivalent Rivière des Français, is a municipality in the Canadian province of Ontario, in the Sudbury District. The municipality had a population of 2,828 in the 2021 Canadian census. It was formed on January 1, 1999, through the merger of the Township of Cosby, Mason and Martland and surrounding unincorporated portions of the Unorganized South Sudbury District. It was named after the French River, which flows through the municipality.

The borders of the municipality are composed of Highway 69 to the west (the French River Trading Post and French River Inn properties are also included within the municipal boundary), West Arm to the north on Highway 535 (just east of Shaw Rd.), the end of Wolseley Bay Rd to the east (Highway 528) and the community of Monetville to the northeast.

Along with the municipalities of St. Charles, Killarney, and Markstay-Warren, it is part of the region known as Sudbury East. These communities partner together on several ventures, including the Sudbury East Planning Board, Sudbury East Municipal Association, Manitoulin-Sudbury District Services Board (MSDSB) and Sudbury East Board of Trade.

== Communities ==
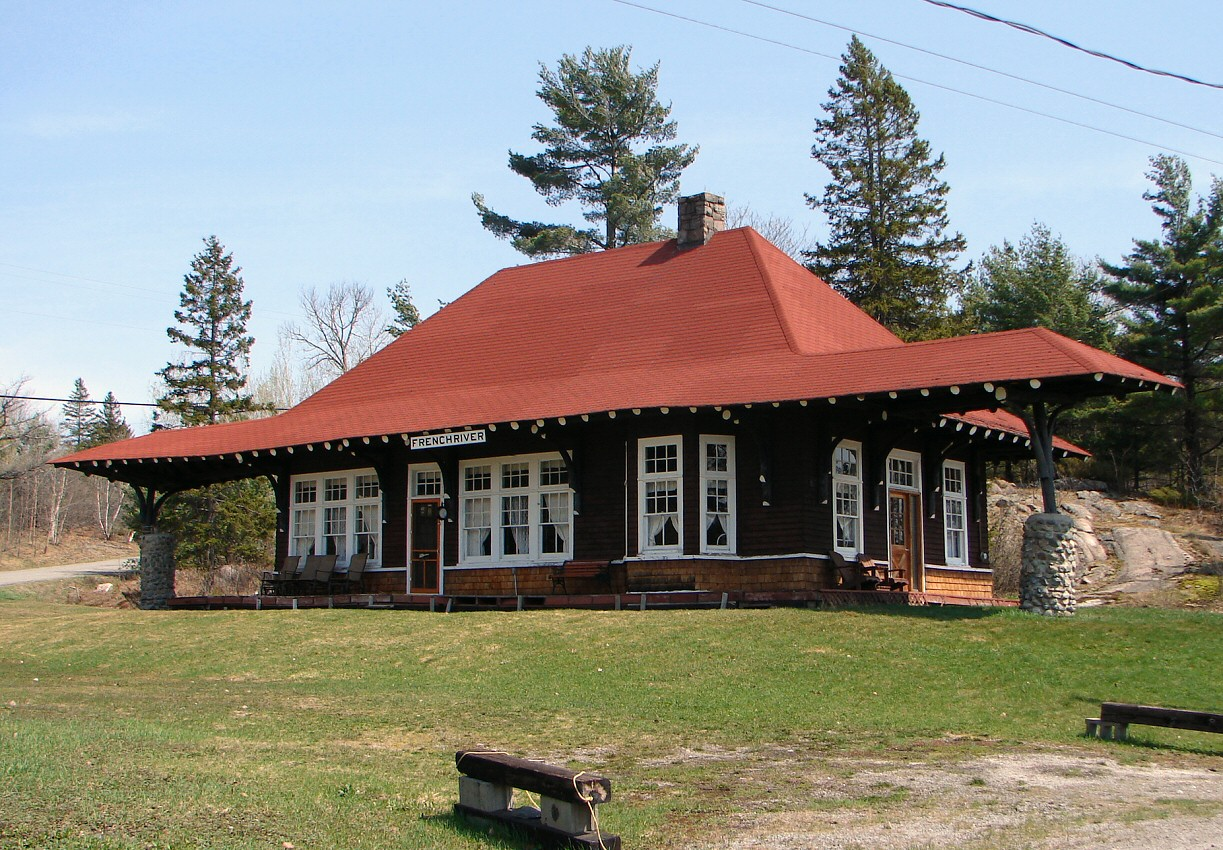
Historic train station from circa 1900 in French River Station.

The municipality comprises the communities of Alban, Bigwood, Chartrand Corner, Delamere, Dokis First Nation, French River Station, Happy Landing, Jamot, Monetville, Noëlville, North Monetville, Ouellette, Rutter, Sucker Creek Landing and Wolseley Bay.

=== Alban ===
The community of Alban was originally established in 1907 as Rutter, named for the nearby railway station in 1907, but in 1937 the community was renamed for Rev. J. Alban Filiatrault. In 1934, the Parish of Notre-Dame-de-Lourdes was created. Jean-Baptiste Rochon donated several acres of land to the people of Alban to erect a church. During the night of February 6, 1953, the church burned to the ground. The following Sunday, Father Oliva Campeau proposed the immediate reconstruction of the church. This time, it was to be constructed with brick and the walls of plaster instead of wood.

=== Monetville ===
Originally known as Martland, the community was first settled in 1895 by Cyrille Monette (né Alexandre Boisvert) and four other pioneers. It became a municipality in 1906 and adopted the name Monetville. Monetville is divided into two areas; North Monetville and Monetville. "South" Monetville is generally from Dokis Road south to Bear Lake and Shanty Bay (Baie des Chantiers) of Lake Nipissing. North Monetville extends generally from Dokis Road north to the West Arm of Lake Nipissing and Chapel Island, which Highway 64 crosses on the West Arm. North Monetville was settled by the Douglas Family, the Mercer Family and the Purcell family in the early 1900s.

On August 27, 2020, the West Nipissing Historical Society held an unveiling ceremony for the erection of a stone cairn monument in recognition of Cyrille Monette as the founder of Monetville and the first pioneer to the area. The monument bears two plaques, one in English, one in French, briefly describing M. Monette's contributions to the development of the area. This project was funded by the Society and several sponsors and donors who helped to make it possible. Cyrille Monette's original and real name was apparently 'Alexandre Boisvert', a name which he would have relinquished between 1863 and 1871 (Le lien entre Louis Riel et le Nord de l'Ontario) after participating in the Red River uprising with Louis Riel. Approximately 80 people attended the unveiling, about half of whom were descendants of the Monette family. Mayor Gisele Pageau of the Municipality of French River and Mayor Joanne Savage of West Nipissing were among the presenters. Elder Richard Meilleur of the Métis Nipissing Families shared a tobacco ceremony to honour the ancestors. The Monette Monument is located at 5690 Highway 64 in Monetville (Municipality of French River) Facebook: West Nipissing Historical Society

=== Noëlville ===
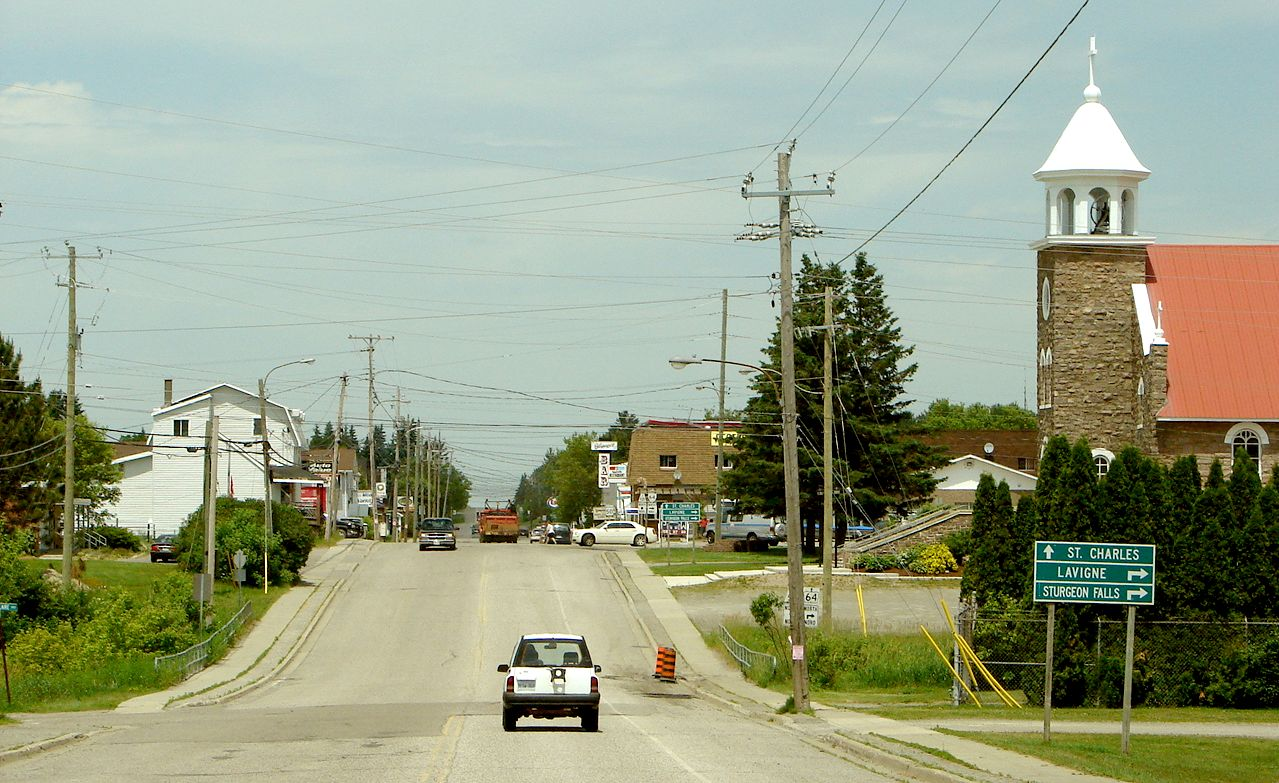
Noëlville

Noëlville, originally known as Cosby, was founded in 1905 with the arrival of settlers in the region. Noëlville families travelled by boat, to the south-west end of Lake Nipissing, to establish themselves between Lake Nipissing and the French River. To pay homage to Noël Desmarais, the village's first merchant and the first businessman of the region, the town of Cosby became Noëlville in 1911. Desmarais is a grandfather of businessman Paul Desmarais. Noël Desmarais was one of the first to start his family business in Noëlville.

=== North Monetville ===
The North Monetville area straddles the municipal boundary between French River and West Nipissing. Designated in the 1970s to aid the delivery of supplies to the Monetville Public School, which was located several kilometers north on Highway 64 from the signposts designating the town of Monetville. Sucker Creek Landing and Chapel Island are both considered to be part of North Monetville, with Highway 64 crossing Chapel Island and bridging the West Arm Narrows of Lake Nipissing at both ends of the island. Most residents of North Monetville simply state their address as "Monetville" even if they do live in the north end of the village.

The Community of Christ cemetery, 339 East Road, has a Canadian World War II hero buried there. Sgt. Wallace Edmond Firlotte, who served with the Lincoln and Welland Regiment during the war, was bestowed six war decorations. Firlotte was one of only a very few Canadians that was bestowed the Order of the Bronze Lion for heroism from the Crown of the Netherlands. This award is presented for "Deeds of extreme bravery and leadership in battle favouring the Netherlands". The Prince personally presented this Order to Sgt. Firlotte by Royal Decree on December 8, 1945.

== Demographics ==
In the 2021 Census of Population conducted by Statistics Canada, French River had a population of 2,828 living in 1,367 of its 2,098 total private dwellings, a change of 6.2% from its 2016 population of 2,662. With a land area of 717.91 km^{2} (277.19 sq mi), it had a population density of 3.9/km^{2} (10.2/sq mi) in 2021.

Canada census – French River / Rivière des Français community profile

	2021	2016	2011
Population	2,828 (+6.2% from 2016)	2,662 (+9.0% from 2011)	2,442 (-8.2% from 2006)
Land area	717.91 km^{2} (277.19 sq mi)	735.48 km^{2} (283.97 sq mi)	735.47 km^{2} (283.97 sq mi)
Population density	3.9/km^{2} (10/sq mi)	3.6/km^{2} (9.3/sq mi)	3.3/km^{2} (8.5/sq mi)
Median age	58.0 (M: 58.8, F: 57.2)	54.7 (M: 55.3, F: 54.1)	53.7 (M: 53.8, F: 53.7)
Private dwellings	2,098 (total) 1,367 (occupied)	2,108 (total)	1,833 (total)
Median household income	$68,000	$60,928

References: 2021 2016 2011

Historical census populations – French River / Rivière des Français

Year	Pop.	±%
1996	2,847	—
2001	2,810	−1.3%
2006	2,659	−5.4%

Year	Pop.	±%
2011	2,442	−8.2%
2016	2,662	+9.0%
2021	2,828	+6.2%

Statistics Canada

== Government ==
The municipal office is located at 44 St-Christophe Street in Noëlville. The council is composed of the mayor and six councillors. The current mayor is Gisèle Pageau.

French River utilizes the mail-in balloting system for municipal elections rather than polling stations. Voter turnout in the 2010 elections was 62%.

The 2019 operating budget for French River was approximately $8 million. The municipality employs approximately 30 staff and has 20 volunteer firefighters.

== See also ==
- List of townships in Ontario
- List of francophone communities in Ontario
