= Ontario Highway 804 =

Ontario provincial highway

Highway 804
- Map of Highway 804, highlighted in red

Route information
- Maintained by Ministry of Transportation of Ontario
- Length: 21.4 km (13.3 mi)
- Existed: April 25, 1962–present

Major junctions
- West end: Manitou Falls Dam
- East end: Highway 105 near Ear Falls

Location
- Country: Canada
- Province: Ontario
- Districts: Kenora

Highway system
- Ontario provincial highways; Current; Former; 400-series
← Highway 802	→ Highway 805
Former provincial highways
← Highway 803

Tertiary Highway 804, commonly referred to as Highway 804, is a provincially maintained access road in the Canadian province of Ontario, located in Kenora District. The 21.4 kilometres (13.3 mi) route provides access to the Lower Manitou Falls Generating Station from Highway 105 near Ear Falls. Highway 804 was designated in 1962 and has remained unchanged since then.

== Route description ==
Highway 804 is 21.4 kilometres (13.3 mi) long, and connects Highway 105 south of the town of Ear Falls with the hydroelectric dam at Lower Manitou Falls. The short highway travels entirely through an uninhabited forested region dotted with lakes and swamps. Near the western end of the route, a logging road branches northwest that provides a rough and winding connection to Highway 658 as well as to the northern terminus of Highway 105 in Red Lake. On an average day, only 60 vehicles travel along the highway. Highway 804 is located within Kenora District, in territory that has not been organised into geographic townships.

== History ==
Highway 804 was designated on April 25, 1962. It was paved in 1969. At that time, it was the only tertiary highway in Ontario that was paved, but it has since reverted to a loose gravel surface highway. The route and length of the highway have remained unchanged since it was designated.

== Major intersections ==
The following table lists the major junctions along Highway 804, as noted by the Ministry of Transportation of Ontario. The entire route is located in Kenora District.

Location	km	mi	Destinations	Notes
Manitou Falls	0.0	0.0		Lower Manitou Falls Dam
Ear Falls	21.4	13.3	Highway 105 – Red Lake	
1.000 mi = 1.609 km; 1.000 km = 0.621 mi
