= Ontario Highway 618 =

Ontario provincial highway

Highway 618

Route information
- Maintained by Ministry of Transportation of Ontario
- Length: 11.7 km (7.3 mi)
- Existed: 1956–present

Major junctions
- West end: Olsen Mine Road in Starratt-Olsen
- East end: Highway 105 – Ear Falls, Vermilion Bay

Location
- Country: Canada
- Province: Ontario
- Districts: Kenora
- Towns: Red Lake

Highway system
- Ontario provincial highways; Current; Former; 400-series
← Highway 617	→ Highway 619

Secondary Highway 618, commonly referred to as Highway 618, is a provincially maintained secondary highway in the Canadian province of Ontario. It connects Olsen Mine and Madsen with the northern terminus of Highway 105 in the town of Red Lake. The 11.7-kilometre (7.3 mi) route was established in 1956, and has remained the same since then. It passes through a remote forested area, and encounters no communities of any significance outside of Red Lake. The route was assumed by the Department of Highways, predecessor to today's Ministry of Transportation of Ontario, in 1956, along with many other secondary highways in Ontario. The route has remained unchanged since then.

== Route description ==
Highway 618 is a short highway which serves to connect several mines and the community of Madsen with the northern terminus of Highway 105 in the town of Red Lake. On an average day, 500 vehicles travel the route, which is 11.7 kilometres (7.3 mi) long. Owing to the geography of the area, the route serves through traffic and no residences or farms lie next to it.

The route begins at Olsen Mine Road and travels east-northeast through thick boreal forest. It meets a forestry road and Main Street towards Madsen. The highway passes north of Faulkenham Lake and travels parallel to a high-tension power line including the town of Redditt. Continuing northeast, Highway 618 zig-zags through the forest, then enters Red Lake, where it is also known as Howey Street. The route shares its eastern terminus with the northern terminus of Highway 105.

== History ==
Highway 618 was first assumed by the Department of Highways, predecessor to the modern Ministry of Transportation of Ontario in early 1956, along with several dozen other secondary highways, but was possibly maintained by the province as a development road prior to that. The route has remained unchanged since then.

== Major intersections ==
The following table lists the major junctions along Highway 618. The entirety of the route is located within Kenora District.

Location	km	Destinations	Notes
Starratt-Olsen	0.0	Olsen Mine Road	
Madsen	1.3	Main Street	
Red Lake	10.2	Starratt Street	
Red Lake	11.7	Highway 105	
1.000 mi = 1.609 km; 1.000 km = 0.621 mi
