= Ontario Highway 105 =

Ontario provincial highway

Highway 105
- Highway 105 highlighted in red

Route information
- Maintained by Ministry of Transportation of Ontario
- Length: 173.5 km (107.8 mi)
- Existed: August 27, 1947–present

Major junctions
- South end: Highway 17 near Vermilion Bay
- Highway 609 – Quibell; Highway 804 – Manitou Falls; Highway 125 (Balmertown Road) – Balmerston, Cochenour
- North end: Highway 618 in Red Lake

Location
- Country: Canada
- Province: Ontario
- Towns: Ear Falls, Red Lake

Highway system
- Ontario provincial highways; Current; Former; 400-series
← Highway 102	→ Highway 108
Former provincial highways
← Highway 104	Highway 106 →

King's Highway 105, commonly referred to as Highway 105, is a provincially maintained highway in the Canadian province of Ontario. Located in the Kenora District of northern Ontario, the highway extends for 173.5 kilometres (107.8 mi) from an intersection with Highway 17 between Kenora and Dryden with the Red Lake mining area to the north. The route also passes through the town of Ear Falls near its midpoint. Highway 105 was built to provide access to the large gold deposits at Red Lake, which were only accessible by boat or plane between their discovery in 1926 and the opening of the highway in 1946. Highway 105 passes through long stretches of isolated forest and lakeland, with no services available between the distanced communities along the route.

== Route description ==
Highway 105 is a 173.5 km (107.8 mi) route which connects Highway 17 between Kenora and Dryden with the Red Lake mining area. Gold was discovered by brothers Lorne and Ray Howey under an overturned tree in 1925, setting off a gold rush that would see several new towns built in the remote northern region. The highway provides the only road connection with the rest of the province. The vast majority of land surrounding the route is precambrian Canadian Shield, with bedrock outcroppings, small lakes, muskeg, and boreal forest dominating the landscape. Due to the long distance between services, which are unavailable outside of Red Lake, Ear Falls and Perrault Falls, travellers should be prepared before setting out along the highway.

The route begins at a junction with Highway 17 on the west side of Vermilion Bay, approximately 100 km (62 mi) east of Kenora and 40 km (25 mi) west of Dryden, travelling north. It progresses through a large region of uninhabited lakes, swamplands, forests and rocks for 103 km (64 mi) to Ear Falls, with Red Lake Road and Perrault Falls being the only communities between the two. The hamlet of Red Lake Road, located 13 km (8.1 mi) north of Highway 17, features a railway flag stop along the Canadian National transcontinental railway, as well as an intersection with Highway 609 westward to Quibell. Perrault Falls, located 65 km (40 mi) north of Highway 17, features the namesake waterfall between Perrault and Wabaskang Lakes. A restaurant, store and gas station can be found at the Perrault Falls Adventure area near the highway. North of Perrault Falls, Highway 105 travels parallel to a power transmission corridor for most of the remainder of the route.

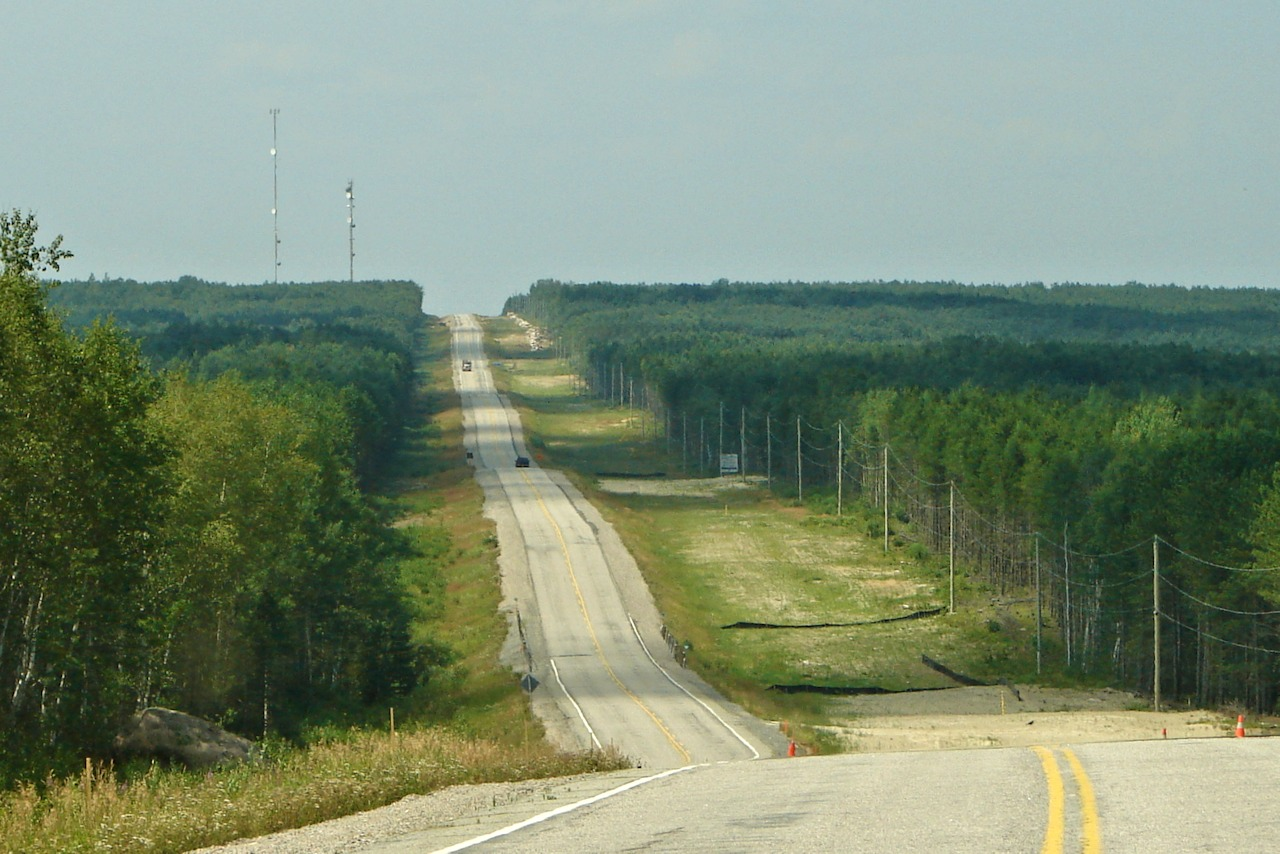
Highway 105 between Ear Falls and Red Lake

Approaching Ear Falls, the route intersects Highway 804, which branches west to the Manitou Falls hydroelectric dam. Within Ear Falls, it crosses adjacent to the 29.3 megawatt Obishikokaang Waasiganikewigamig Generating Station at the outlet of Lac Seul into the English River. Immediately to the north, Highway 657 branches east to the former Hudson's Bay Company fur trading outpost at Goldpines, now home to several fishing and camping lodges. Approximately 20 km (12 mi) north of Ear Falls, Highway 105 passes east of Pakwash Provincial Park and through the community of Snake River. As the route approaches Red Lake from the east, it encounters Highway 125, which branches north to Balmerton and Cochenour, as well as the Red Lake Airport (CYRL), once the busiest airport in the world. After swerving through Red Lake, the highway ends at Howey Street, which continues west as Highway 618 to several mines and the community of Madsen.

== History ==
Highway 105 adjacent to Cedar Lake, 50 km (31 mi) north of Highway 17, in 1951

=== Red Lake gold rush ===
The Red Lake area was first established in the mid-to-late 1920s following the discovery of gold by brothers Lorne and Ray Howey and their crews on July 25, 1925. Prospectors had been searching the Red Lake area as early as 1922 in search of lode gold deposits. Lorne, leading a separate expedition from his brother, discovered gold in a quartz vein under an uprooted tree as his crew prepared to leave for the Goldpines area. It would take until the end of the year for news to travel and the ensuing gold rush to begin. By the end of 1926, Red Lake was established, with thousands of people enduring the six night trek from Hudson (near Sioux Lookout) to Howey Bay. A dam was constructed where the English River drains from Lac Seul between 1928 and 1930 to provide power to the mining operations, around which the town of Ear Falls would be established.

While the need for a road was evident, the rising use of aircraft was seen as a simpler method of transporting people and materials; the airport at Howey Bay (Red Lake) was the busiest airport in the world in 1936 and 1937. In addition, the government was hesitant to invest in a road not knowing the potential prosperity of the new discovery. While both the towns and mine operators lobbied the government for a permanent road connection to Red Lake, the Great Depression followed by the onset of World War II would delay its arrival for 20 years.

Highway 105 south of Red Lake in 1947

=== Red Lake Road ===
Following the end of the war, advances in machinery and construction techniques as well as new deposits found near Red Lake resulted in an increased push for a road link with the rest of the province. Mine owners, such as Jack Hammell, as well as the Red Lake Chamber of Commerce continued to petition the government in the face of quickly increasing mine output. The government conceded, and on February 28, 1946, Minister of Highways George Doucett formally confirmed that the province would construct a new highway to Red Lake.

After deciding on a route, work began immediately. In April 1946, the province tendered eight contracts of 16-kilometre (10-mile) segments, with work carried out on each simultaneously. 3500 tonnes of equipment was brought by water to assist in construction, which proceeded throughout the remainder of the year. The first truck drove the length of the new gravel highway on December 5, 1946. Twelve days later on December 17, Minister Doucett traversed the route with a convoy of trucks in just under 4 hours. The new 7.3-metre (24 ft) wide road cost approximately CAD$3 million (in $1947, 45,800,000 adjusted for inflation) to build, and featured five timber-framed bridges.

=== Completion and paving ===
Highway 105 was officially opened in a ceremony attended by Ontario premier George A. Drew and minister George Doucett on August 27, 1947. The ceremony took place at Perrault Falls, where minister Doucett broke through the final barrier on the highway, followed by the playing of the national anthem. Minister Doucett was given a bear cub by one of the construction companies for all his efforts towards the creation of the route. The new road was gravel surfaced its entire length, which quickly gave rise to numerous potholes. By the 1960s, the provincial government was once again being pressured to improve access to Red Lake. Construction began to pave the route in 1962 and was completed in the summer of 1967. Aside from minor realignments, Highway 105 has remained unchanged since then.

== Major intersections ==
The following table lists the major junctions along Highway 105, as noted by the Ministry of Transportation of Ontario. The entire route is located in Kenora District.

Location	km	mi	Destinations	Notes
Vermilion Bay	0.0	0.0	Highway 17 / TCH – Thunder Bay, Kenora	Southern terminus
Red Lake Road	13.2	8.2	Highway 609 (to Quibell Road)	CN flag stop
Perrault Falls	65.0	40.4		
Unorganized Kenora District	77.6	48.2	Onaway Lac Seul Road – Onaway Lodge	
Ear Falls	99.9	62.1	Highway 804 – Manitou Falls	
Ear Falls	101.7	63.2	English River Bridge	
Ear Falls	103.1	64.1	Highway 657 (Gold Pines Road)	
Red Lake	170.7	106.1	Highway 125 (Balmertown Road)	
Red Lake	173.5	107.8	Highway 618	Northern terminus
1.000 mi = 1.609 km; 1.000 km = 0.621 mi
