= Red Lake Area Combined Roman Catholic Separate School Board =

School district in Ontario, Canada

Location
- 54 Discovery Road, Red Lake, Ontario Red Lake, Ontario Canada

District information
- Chair of the board: Vaughn Blab
- Schools: 1
- District ID: B16080

Students and staff
- Students: 119

The Red Lake Area Combined Roman Catholic Separate School Board manages one school, St. John's Catholic School, in Red Lake, Ontario. The Board exists because of the remote location of the town, and it is a member of the Northern School Resource Alliance, which is an association of smaller organizations which operate schools in remote towns of northern Ontario.
