= List of Ontario provincial highways =

Current highways in Ontario's highway network

Ontario Provincial Highway Network
- Highway markers for King's Highway 17, King's Highway 401, Secondary Highway 600, and Tertiary Highway 800

System information
- Maintained by the Ministry of Transportation of Ontario
- Length: 17,459 km (10,849 mi)
- Formed: February 26, 1920

Highway names
- Types: King's Highway n (2–169); Secondary Highway n (500–673); Tertiary Highway n (800–813)

System links
- Ontario provincial highways; Current; Former; 400-series

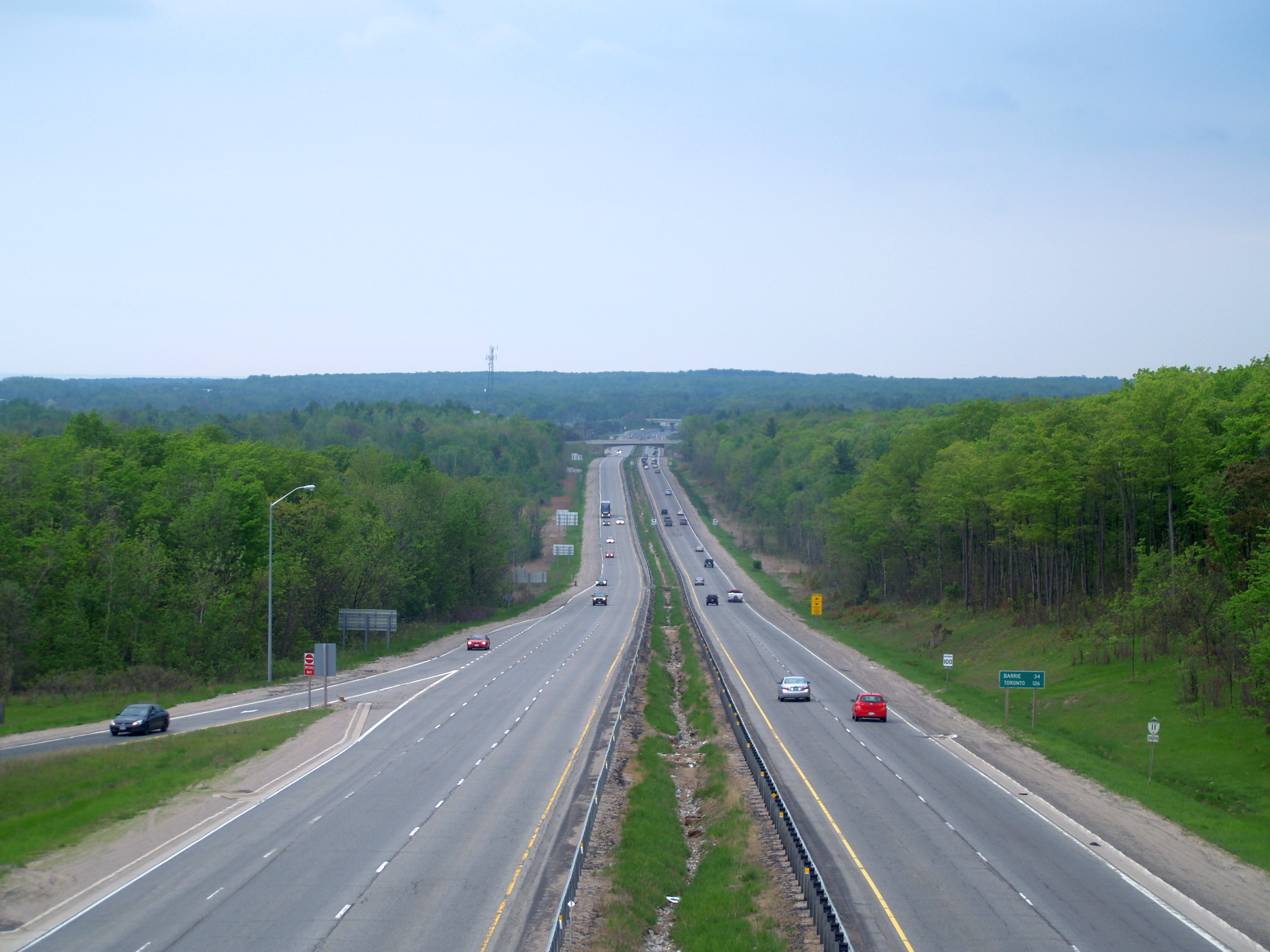
Ontario Highway 11

Provincial highways in Ontario include all roads maintained by the Ministry of Transportation as part of Ontario's provincial highway network.

== King's Highway ==
Although all roads in the provincial highway network are under the name King's Highway, the term is primarily associated with the highways numbered 2 through 148, the 400-series highways and the Queen Elizabeth Way.

Number	Length (km)	Length (mi)	Southern or western terminus	Northern or eastern terminus	Formed	Removed	Notes
Highway 2	1.0	0.62	Highway 401 in Gananoque	Gananoque limits	1917	current	Originally was longer, but almost the whole route was given to Municipal Governments
Highway 3	258.2	160.4	Ambassador Bridge to I-75 / I-96 in Detroit, Michigan	Rosehill Road in Fort Erie	1920	current	Discontinuous between Highway 77 in Leamington and Highway 4 at Tabotville Royal, as well as through Port Colborne
Highway 4	101.6	63.1	Highway 3 – St. Thomas	Highway 8 – Clinton	1920	current	
Highway 5	14.0	8.7	Highway 8 at Peters Corners	Highway 6 at Clappinson's Corners	1920	current	MTO continues to maintain 1.5 km (0.93 mi) of Highway 5 over Highway 407 and Highway 403
Highway 6	472.4	293.5	St. Patrick Street in Port Dover	Highway 17 – McKerrow	1920	current	
Highway 7	535.7	332.9	Highway 4 – Elginfield	Highway 417 – Ottawa	1920	current	Discontinuous between Georgetown and Markham, instead signed as RR-7
Highway 7A	48.3	30.0	Highway 7 / Highway 12 near Port Perry	Highway 115 near Peterborough	1933	current	
Highway 8	159.7	99.2	Highway 21 – Goderich	Highway 5 near Dundas	1918	current	
Highway 9	119.0	73.9	Highway 21 – Kincardine	Highway 400 (near Newmarket)	1920	current	Discontinuous between Harriston and Orangeville
Highway 10	137.3	85.3	Northern terminus of Highway 410 in Caledon	Highway 21 / Highway 26 – Owen Sound	1920	current	
Highway 11	1784.9	1,109.1	Highway 400 – Barrie	MN 72 – Baudette, MN	1920	current	Portions of this highway are branches of the Trans-Canada Highway, also short concurrency with Highway 12 TCH
Highway 11B	6.6	4.1	Highway 11 near Gillies	Temiskaming Shores south limits	1963	current	Tri-Town Bypass; not assumed through Cobalt
Highway 11B	3.3	2.1	Highway 11	Zuke Road in Atikokan	1965	current	Atikokan Business spur
Highway 12	145.1	90.2	Gatineau hydro corridor south of Brooklin	Highway 93 – Midland	1922	current	Part of a TCH branch, also short concurrency with Highway 11.
Highway 15	115.4	71.7	Highway 401 – Kingston	Highway 7 – Carleton Place	1920	current	
Highway 16	3.6	2.2	NY 812 – Ogdensburg, NY	Highway 416 – Prescott	1918	current	
Highway 17	1964.0	1,220.4	PTH 1 (TCH) towards Winnipeg	Highway 417 near Arnprior	1920	current	Full route as Trans-Canada Highway main route
Highway 17A	33.3	20.7	Highway 17 west near Keewatin	Highway 17 east near Kenora	1990	current	Kenora Bypass
Highway 17B	0.9	0.56	Highway 17	North Bay west limits at Duchesnay Creek bridge	1958	current	North Bay Business Route
Highway 17B	20.6	12.8	Highway 17 east via Bar River Road	Highway 17 west – Sault Ste. Marie near Kenora	2008	current	Garden River
Highway 19	24.1	15.0	Highway 3 in Tillsonburg	Highway 401 near Ingersoll	1930	current	
Highway 20	1.9	1.2	Highway 58 near Allanburg	Regional Road 70 (Townline Road) – Niagara Falls	1930	current	
Highway 21	226.8	140.9	Highway 402 near Wyoming	Highway 6 / Highway 10 / Highway 26 in Owen Sound	1927	current	
Highway 23	97.7	60.7	Highway 7 near Elginfield	Highway 9 / Highway 89 in Harriston	1927	current	
Highway 24	64.1	39.8	Highway 3 in Simcoe	Cambridge south limits	1927	current	
Highway 26	118.6	73.7	Highway 6 / Highway 10 / Highway 21 in Owen Sound	Highway 400 in Barrie	1927	current	
Highway 27	1.6	0.99	Highway 427 south	1.1 km (0.68 mi) south of	1927	current	
Highway 28	162.6	101.0	Highway 7 near Peterborough	Highway 41 at Denbigh	1928	current	
Highway 33	60.9	37.8	Highway 62 in Bloomfield	Collins Bay Road in Kingston	1930	current	
Highway 34	17.8	11.1	Highway 417 near Vankleek Hill	Main Street East / John Street in Hawkesbury	1930	current	
Highway 35	195.6	121.5	Highway 115 near Peterborough	Highway 60 at Dwight	—	—	
Highway 37	44.2	27.5	Highway 401 in Belleville	Highway 7 in Actinolite	1932	current	
Highway 40	91.4	56.8	Highway 401 in Chatham-Kent	Highway 402 in Sarnia	1934	current	
Highway 41	160.5	99.7	Highway 7 in Kaladar	Highway 148 (Pembroke Street East) in Pembroke	1935	current	
Highway 48	65.2	40.5	Major Mackenzie Drive	Highway 12 near Beaverton	1937	current	
Highway 49	5.8	3.6	Quinte Skyway to Prince Edward County	Tyendinaga Mohawk Territory north limits	1962	current	
Highway 58	15.5	9.6	Highway 3 in Port Colborne	Highway 406 in Thorold	1935	current	
Highway 58A	5.1	3.2	Highway 58 in Welland	Highway 140	1974	current	
Highway 60	255.8	158.9	Highway 11 in Huntsville	Highway 17 in Renfrew	1937	current	
Highway 61	61.0	37.9	MN 61 towards Grand Marais, MN	Highway 11 / Highway 17 in Thunder Bay	1937	current	
Highway 62	165.8	103.0	Highway 33 in Bloomfield	Highway 127 at Maynooth	1937	current	
Highway 63	63.5	39.5	North Bay north limits	R-101 in Témiscaming	1937	current	
Highway 64	145.0	90.1	Highway 69 at Rutter	Highway 11 in Marten River	1937	current	
Highway 65	123.3	76.6	Highway 66 near Matachewan	Ontario–Quebec boundary near Notre-Dame-du-Nord	1937	current	
Highway 66	103.5	64.3	Highway 566 near Matachewan	R-117 (TCH) towards Rouyn-Noranda, Quebec	1937	current	
Highway 67	9.8	6.1	Highway 11 – Porquis Junction	De Troyes Avenue in Iroquois Falls	1937	current	
Highway 69	140.3	87.2	Northern terminus of Highway 400 near Carling	Highway 17 in Sudbury	1936	current	Partly replaced with Highway 400 extension
Highway 71	194.1	120.6	US 53 / US 71 at International Falls, MN	Highway 17 near Kenora	1937	current	
Highway 72	68.5	42.6	Highway 17 in Dinorwic	Highway 642 in Sioux Lookout	1937	current	
Highway 77	22.6	14.0	Highway 3 in Leamington	Highway 401 near Comber	1963	current	
Highway 85	9.8	6.1	Victoria Street North in Kitchener	Regional Road 15 (King Street) in Woolwich Township	1934	current	
Highway 89	107.0	66.5	Highway 9 in Harriston	Highway 400 near Cookstown	1938	current	
Highway 93	24.1	15.0	Highway 400 near Hillsdale	Highway 12 in Midland	1938	current	Route East of 400 now under municipality as Regional Road 93
Highway 94	12.0	7.5	Highway 654 near Callander	Highway 17 near Corbeil	1937	current	
Highway 101	473.3	294.1	Highway 17 near Wawa	R-388 at Ontario–Quebec border	1940	current	
Highway 102	32.8	20.4	Highway 11 / Highway 17 at Sistonens Corners	Highway 11 / Highway 17 / TCH in Thunder Bay	1972	current	
Highway 105	173.5	107.8	Highway 17 near Vermilion Bay	Highway 618 in Red Lake	1947	current	
Highway 108	41.6	25.8	Highway 17 in Serpent River	Highway 639 north of Elliot Lake	1957	current	
Highway 112	19.6	12.2	Highway 11 near Tarzwell	Highway 66 near Kirkland Lake	1953	current	
Highway 115	56.7	35.2	Highway 401 near Newcastle	Highway 7 in Peterborough	1955	current	
Highway 118	127.8	79.4	Highway 11 near Bracebridge	Highway 28 near Bancroft	1955	current	
Highway 124	91.2	56.7	Highway 400 near Parry Sound	Highway 11 near Sundridge	1955	current	
Highway 125	13.4	8.3	Highway 105 south of Red Lake	Cochenour Ferry Dock	1955	current	
Highway 127	38.6	24.0	Highway 62 at Maynooth	Highway 60 near Whitney	1955	current	
Highway 129	220.7	137.1	Highway 17 in Thessalon	Chapleau south limits	1956	current	
Highway 130	15.4	9.6	Highway 61 near McCluskeys Corners	Highway 11 / Highway 17 / TCH near Thunder Bay	1955	current	
Highway 132	30.3	18.8	Highway 41 near Dacre	Highway 60 in Renfrew	1956	current	
Highway 137	4.3	2.7	I-81 at Wellesley Island, New York	Highway 401 near Ivy Lea	1965	current	
Highway 138	38.7	24.0	9th Street West in Cornwall	Highway 417 (TCH) near Casselman	1967	current	
Highway 140	10.9	6.8	Highway 3 in Port Colborne	Main Street in Welland	1972	current	
Highway 141	54.3	33.7	Highway 400 near Parry Sound	Highway 11 near Port Sydney	1974	current	
Highway 144	271.7	168.8	Highway 17 in Sudbury	Highway 101 near Timmins	1965	current	
Highway 148	7.0	4.3	Highway 41 south (MacKay Street) in Pembroke	R-148 at L'Isle-aux-Allumettes	1982	current	

=== 400-series highways ===
Number	Length (km)	Length (mi)	Southern or western terminus	Northern or eastern terminus	Local names	Formed	Removed	Notes
Highway 400	226.0	140.4	Maple Leaf Drive in Toronto (continues as Black Creek Drive)	Highway 69 in Carling	Toronto–Barrie Highway	1952	current	Scheduled for extension to Sudbury.
Highway 401	828.0	514.5	Gordie Howe International Bridge to I-75 in Detroit, Michigan	A-20 towards Montreal, QC	Macdonald–Cartier Freeway, Rt. Hon. Herb Gray Parkway, Highway of Heroes	1952	current	Backbone of the 400-series network; busiest highway in North America.
Highway 402	102.5	63.7	I-69 / I-94 at Canada–United States border on Blue Water Bridge in Point Edward	Highway 401 in London		1953	current	
Highway 403	125.2	77.8	Highway 401 near Woodstock	Highway 401 / Highway 410 in Mississauga	Chedoke Expressway, Alexander Graham Bell Parkway	1963	current	
Highway 404	50.1	31.1	Highway 401 / DVP in Toronto	Woodbine Avenue in East Gwillimbury		1977	current	
Highway 405	8.7	5.4	Queen Elizabeth Way – St. Catharines	I-190 at Canada–United States border on Queenston-Lewiston Bridge towards Lewiston, NY	General Brock Parkway	1963	current	
Highway 406	26.0	16.2	East Main Street in Welland	Queen Elizabeth Way in St. Catharines		1965	current	
407 ETR / Highway 407	151.4	94.1	Highway 403 / Queen Elizabeth Way in Burlington	Highway 115 in Clarington		1997	current	Tollway divided into two sections; Highway 407E and 407 ETR, with the latter privately operated
Highway 409	5.6	3.5	Pearson Airport in Mississauga	Highway 401 in Toronto	Belfield Expressway	1978	current	
Highway 410	20.3	12.6	Highway 401 / Highway 403 in Mississauga	Highway 10 (Hurontario Street) in Caledon		1978	current	
Highway 412	10.0	6.2	Highway 401 in Whitby	Highway 407 in Whitby	West Durham Link	2016	current	Former tolled Highway. Route number assigned February 5, 2015
Highway 416	76.4	47.5	Highway 401 towards Brockville	Highway 417 in Ottawa	Veterans Memorial Highway	1999	current	
Highway 417	192.0	119.3	Highway 17 in Arnprior	A-40 towards Montreal, QC	Queensway, Trans-Canada Highway	1971	current	Upgraded portion of Highway 17 and unlike most freeways, kilometre posts are numbered east to west.
Highway 418	12.8	8.0	Highway 401 in Clarington	Highway 407 in Clarington	East Durham Link	2019	current	Former tolled highway. Route number assigned February 5, 2015. Opened on December 9, 2019
Highway 420	3.3	2.1	Regional Road 98 (Montrose Road) in Niagara Falls	Regional Road 102 (Stanley Avenue) in Niagara Falls	Niagara Veterans Memorial Highway	1941	current	
Highway 427	27	17	Queen Elizabeth Way/Gardiner Expressway in Toronto	Regional Road 25 in Vaughan		1971	current	6.6 km (4.1 mi) Extension from Highway 7 north to York Regional Road 25 (Major Mackenzie Drive) opened Sept 18 2021
Queen Elizabeth Way	139.1	86.4	I-190 at Canada–United States border on Peace Bridge in Fort Erie	Highway 427 in Toronto		1937	current	

== Secondary highways ==
Number	Length (km)	Length (mi)	Southern or western terminus	Northern or eastern terminus	Formed	Removed	Notes
Highway 502	151.1	93.9	Highway 11 – Fort Frances, Atikokan	Highway 594 near Dryden	1980	current	
Highway 510	2.8	1.7	Highway 520 in Magnetawan	Highway 124 – Parry Sound, Sundridge	1956	current	
Highway 516	103.6	64.4	Highway 72 / Highway 642 in Sioux Lookout	Highway 599 – Savant Lake	1983	current	
Highway 518	72.2	44.9	Highway 400 near Parry Sound	Kearney west limits	1956	current	
Highway 519	30.4	18.9	Highway 17 near Obatanga Provincial Park	Green Lake Road in Dubreuilville	1985	current	
Highway 520	67.9	42.2	Clear Lake Road in Ardbeg	Highway 11 (Exit 257) at Burk's Falls	1956	current	
Highway 522	109.8	68.2	Highway 69 near Cranberry	Highway 11 in Trout Creek	1956	current	
Highway 522B	1.9	1.2	Highway 522 in Trout Creek	Hemlock Road	2002	current	
Highway 523	20.0	12.4	Nipissing–Hastings boundary	Highway 60 in Madawaska	1956	current	
Highway 524	4.6	2.9	Highway 522 at Farley's Corners	Highway 534 near Restoule	1956	current	
Highway 525	35.4	22.0	Highway 596 near Minaki	Islington Indian Reserve entrance	1982	current	
Highway 526	3.9	2.4	Britt post office	Highway 69 near Britt Station	1956	current	
Highway 527	235.1	146.1	Highway 17 in Shuniah	1st Avenue in Armstrong	1976	current	
Highway 528	13.5	8.4	Highway 64 near Noelville	Natures Trail Road in Wolseley Bay	1956	current	
Highway 528A	5.1	3.2	Highway 528 near Wolseley Bay	Dead end at French River	1957	current	
Highway 529	25.7	16.0	Highway 69 near Pointe au Baril	Highway 69 at Magnetawan River	1956	current	
Highway 529A	4.5	2.8	Bayfield Lodge in Bayfield Inlet	Highway 529 at Manbert	1961	current	
Highway 531	3.5	2.2	Maple Road in Bonfield	Highway 17 – North Bay	1956	current	
Highway 532	14.2	8.8	Highway 556 near Glendale	Christina Mine Road	1974	current	
Highway 533	53.2	33.1	Highway 17 in Mattawa	Highway 63 near Eldee	1956	current	
Highway 534	43.6	27.1	Restoule Provincial Park	Highway 11 (Exit 316) in Powassan	1956	current	
Highway 535	48.7	30.3	Highway 64 in Noelville	Sauve Road / Labelle Road at Riviere Veuve	1956	current	
Highway 537	15.4	9.6	Estaire Road (Highway 7279) near Wanup	Finni Road near Wahnapitae	1956	current	
Highway 538	5.4	3.4	Highway 17 at Algoma Mills	Highway 17 between Algoma Mills and Pronto	1956	current	
Highway 539	36.9	22.9	Highway 17 in Warren	Highway 64 in Field	1956	current	
Highway 539A	5.8	3.6	Highway 539 in River Valley	Highway 805 at the Sudbury–Nipissing boundary	1958	current	
Highway 540	131.3	81.6	Front Street in Meldrum Bay	Highway 6 at Little Current	1956	current	
Highway 540A	5.7	3.5	Barrie Island 5th Sideroad near Gore Bay-Manitoulin Airport	Highway 540	1956	current	Initially part of Highway 540
Highway 540B	2.4	1.5	Highway 540 – Little Current, Silver Water; Poplar Road	Highway 540 – Little Current, Meldrum Bay; Highway 542 – Spring Bay	1956	current	Initially part of Highway 540
Highway 542	69.5	43.2	Highway 540 / Highway 540B near Gore Bay	Highway 6 near Tehkummah	1956	current	
Highway 542A	2.4	1.5	10th Sideroad, 2nd Concession Road	Highway 542 – Mindemoya, Gore Bay	1956	current	Initially part of Highway 542
Highway 546	76.5	47.5	Highway 17 at Iron Bridge	Mount Lake	1956	current	
Highway 547	5.6	3.5	Highway 101 near Wawa	Cedar Street in Hawk Junction	1964	current	
Highway 548	74.6	46.4	Highway 548	Highway 17 near Desbarats	1956	current	69.1 km (42.9 mi) loop around St. Joseph Island
Highway 550	11.3	7.0	Dead end in Gros Cap	Highway 17 in Sault Ste. Marie	1956	current	
Highway 550B	2.88	1.79	Highway 550 in Sault Ste. Marie	Huron Street near the Sault Ste. Marie International Bridge	—	—	
Highway 551	28.5	17.7	Government Road near Providence Bay	Highway 540 at M'Chigeeng First Nation	1956	current	
Highway 552	18.3	11.4	Highway 556 at Island Lake	Grant's Road in Goulais Bay	1956	current	
Highway 553	31.7	19.7	Highway 17 in Massey	Highway 810 at Bull Lake	1956	current	
Highway 554	16.6	10.3	Highway 129 northeast of Wharncliffe	Highway 546 near Parkinson	1956	current	
Highway 556	103.7	64.4	Highway 17 at Heyden	Highway 129 near Aubrey Falls	1956	current	
Highway 557	19.7	12.2	Granary Lake Road near Blind River	Matinenda Lake	1956	current	
Highway 558	16.8	10.4	Montreal River at Mowat Landing	Temiskaming Shores west limits at Mowat Landing Road/Firstbrook Line Road	1956	current	
Highway 559	18.2	11.3	Blind Bay Road at Killbear Provincial Park	Highway 400 at Nobel	1961	current	
Highway 560	183.9	114.3	Highway 144 / Sultan Industrial Road	Highway 11 in Englehart	1956	current	
Highway 560A	9.5	5.9	Westree railway station	Highway 560 near Morin Village	1957	current	
Highway 562	14.5	9.0	Highway 65 at McCool	Highway 11 at Thornloe	1956	current	
Highway 563	5.5	3.4	Batchawana Bay government dock at Lake Superior	Highway 17 – Wawa, Sault Ste. Marie	1956	current	
Highway 564	7.0	4.3	Highway 112 near Tarzwell	Boston Creek	1956	current	
Highway 565	1.6	0.99	Sault Ste. Marie north limits at Base Line	Highway 550 in Prince	1956	current	
Highway 566	25.9	16.1	Ashley Mine	Highway 66 at Matachewan	1956	current	
Highway 567	34.5	21.4	Lower Notch Dam at Montreal River and Matabitchuan River	Temiskaming Shores south limits	1956	current	
Highway 568	2.4	1.5	Highway 11 at Kenogami Lake	Kenogami Lake Station	1956	current	
Highway 569	28.3	17.6	Highway 11 in Harley	Highway 11/ Highway 624 in Evanturel	1956	current	
Highway 570	4.4	2.7	Highway 11 – North Bay, Cochrane	Sesekinika	1956	current	
Highway 571	5.8	3.6	Highway 562 – Thornloe, Elk Lake	Highway 640 at Earlton	1956	current	
Highway 572	16.5	10.3	Highway 11 in Ramore	Highway 101 east of Matheson	1956	current	
Highway 573	19.7	12.2	Highway 560 at Charlton	Highway 11 – North Bay, Cochrane	1956	current	
Highway 574	15.9	9.9	Fox Concession Road 2 at Norembega	Highway 652 near Brower	1956	current	
Highway 575	20.0	12.4	Highway 17 in Verner	Highway 64 in Field	1974	current	
Highway 577	10.6	6.6	Highway 101 at Shillington	Highway 11 near Monteith	1956	current	
Highway 579	31.2	19.4	5th Street / Western Avenue in Cochrane	Gardiner	1956	current	
Highway 580	12.5	7.8	Poplar Lodge at Lake Nipigon	Highway 11 near Beardmore	1956	current	
Highway 581	10.6	6.6	Highway 11 in Moonbeam	René Brunelle Provincial Park	1956	current	
Highway 582	6.4	4.0	Highway 11 / Highway 17 / TCH	Highway 11 / Highway 17 / TCH	1956	current	Loop through Hurkett
Highway 583	39.2	24.4	Mead railway crossing	Government dock at Lac-Sainte-Thérèse	1956	current	
Highway 584	53.1	33.0	North of Geraldton	Warren Street in Nakina	1956	current	
Highway 585	37.1	23.1	Highway 11 / Highway 17 / TCH near Nipigon, Ontario	Pine Portage Hydroelectric Power Plant	1956	current	
Highway 586	5.2	3.2	Dead end at Shebandowan Lakes	Highway 11 near Shebandowan	1956	current	
Highway 587	41.0	25.5	Silver Islet loop in Sleeping Giant Provincial Park	Highway 11 / Highway 17 / TCH near Loon	1956	current	
Highway 588	54.0	33.6	0.8 km (0.50 mi) west of McKechnie Road in Nolalu	Highway 11 / Highway 17 / TCH in Oliver Paipoonge	1956	current	
Highway 589	25.7	16.0	Thunder Bay north limits	Mary Lake Road near Jacques	1956	current	
Highway 590	23.7	14.7	Highway 588 in Nolalu	Highway 11 / Highway 17 / TCH at Kakabeka Falls	1956	current	
Highway 591	7.8	4.8	Highway 589 in Lappe, Ontario	Island Lake Road near Fowler	1956	current	
Highway 592	16.4	10.2	Highway 11 (Exit 235) at Novar	Katrine Road (Highway 7188 near Katrine	1961	current	
Highway 593	37.9	23.5	Highway 61 near Canada–US border	Highway 588 between Suomi and Nolalu	1956	current	
Highway 594	37.4	23.2	Highway 17 near Eagle River	Highway 17 in Dryden	1956	current	
Highway 595	39.3	24.4	Highway 597 near Pardee	Highway 590 west of Kakabeka Falls	1956	current	
Highway 596	42.3	26.3	Highway 17A (Kenora Bypass) in Kenora	Minaki	1956	current	
Highway 597	15.3	9.5	Cloud Lake Road at Pardee	Highway 608 east of South Gillies	1956	current	
Highway 599	291.0	180.8	Highway 17 in Ignace	NORT Road in Central Patricia	1956	current	
Highway 600	86.4	53.7	Rainy River north limits north of Highway 11	Highway 71 near Black Hawk	1956	current	
Highway 601	25.0	15.5	Dryden north limits	Highway 17 / TCH	1956	current	
Highway 602	44.6	27.7	Highway 11 / Highway 71 / TCH in Emo	Fort Frances west limits at Oakwood Road	1956	current	
Highway 603	4.5	2.8	Highway 17 / TCH at Borups Corners	CPR flag stop at Dyment	1956	current	
Highway 605	12.4	7.7	Highway 17 / TCH at Oxdrift	Road fork near Eton-Rugby	1956	current	
Highway 607	9.5	5.9	Highway 69 near Bigwood	Highway 64 near Alban	1956	current	
Highway 607A	2.6	1.6	Schell's Camp at Bon Air	Highway 607 near Bigwood	1957	current	
Highway 608	19.0	11.8	Highway 595 at South Gilies	Highway 61 at Moose Hill	1956	current	
Highway 609	15.5	9.6	Highway 105 at Red Lake Road	Dead end at Clay Lake	1956	current	
Highway 611	22.1	13.7	Highway 602 near Fort Frances	Rose Road near Lake Wasaw	1956	current	
Highway 612	4.4	2.7	Parry Sound – Muskoka boundary	Lake Joseph Road (Highway 7289) at Gordon Bay	1960	current	
Highway 613	39.9	24.8	Highway 602 at Big Fork	Dead end at Lake Despair government dock near Naicatchewenin First Nation	1956	current	
Highway 614	51.8	32.2	Highway 17 / TCH – Marathon, White River	Adjala Avenue in Manitouwadge	1956	current	
Highway 615	21.3	13.2	Highway 71 / TCH near Off Lake Corner	Dead end at Clearwater Lake	1956	current	
Highway 617	24.1	15.0	Highway 11 at Stratton	Highway 600 at North Branch	1956	current	
Highway 618	11.6	7.2	Dead end in Starratt-Olsen	Highway 105 in Red Lake	1956	current	
Highway 619	40.6	25.2	Highway 11 at Pinewood	Highway 621 at Minahico	1956	current	
Highway 621	50.5	31.4	Highway 11 at Sleeman	Lake of the Woods dock near Morson	1956	current	
Highway 622	129.1	80.2	Highway 11B in Atikokan	Highway 17 / TCH west of Ignace	1958	current	
Highway 623	5.0	3.1	Highway 11 / TCH east of Atikokan	Bush Road at Sapawe	1962	current	
Highway 624	41.8	26.0	Highway 11 / Highway 569 / TCH in Evanturel	Highway 66 / TCH in Larder Lake	1960	current	
Highway 625	29.6	18.4	Tamarac Drive in Caramat	Highway 11 / TCH near Longlac	1958	current	
Highway 627	13.2	8.2	Pukaskwa National Park near Pic River	Highway 17 / TCH near Marathon	1958	current	
Highway 628	7.3	4.5	Highway 11 / Highway 17 / TCH near Nipigon	Redditt CNR station in Red Rock	1961	current	
Highway 630	27.7	17.2	Kiosk	Highway 17 / TCH near Eau Claire Station	1961	current	
Highway 631	167.2	103.9	Highway 17 / TCH in White River	Highway 11 / TCH between Longlac and Hearst	1958	current	Hornepayne Access Road
Highway 632	10.7	6.6	Parry Sound – Muskoka boundary near Minett	Highway 141 in Rosseau	1961	current	
Highway 633	5.1	3.2	Highway 11 / TCH east of Atikokan	Dead end at Kawene flag stop	1959	current	
Highway 634	80.1	49.8	Highway 11 / TCH in Smooth Rock Falls	Abitibi Canyon Generating Station at Abitibi Canyon	1966	current	Numbered as Highway 807 until 1976
Highway 636	4.8	3.0	Highway 11 near Cochrane	Clute Concession Road 6	1961	current	
Highway 637	67.7	42.1	Channel Street in Killarney	Highway 69 at Rock Bay	1962	current	
Highway 638	51.0	31.7	Highway 17B in Echo Bay	Bruce Mines north limits	1962	current	
Highway 639	23.2	14.4	Highway 108 at Quirke Mine Road in Elliot Lake	Highway 546 north of Elliot Lake	1963	current	
Highway 641	13.4	8.3	Highway 17 near Keewatin	Highway 596 near Laclu	1963	current	Renumbered from Highway 641
Highway 642	73.0	45.4	Highway 72 / Highway 516 (Ed Ariano Bypass) in Sioux Lookout	Highway 590 in Silver Dollar	1963	current	
Highway 643	19.6	12.2	Cavell Road near Aroland First Nation	Highway 584 near Nakina	1963	current	
Highway 645	4.0	2.5	Tramway Avenue at Byng Inlet	Highway 529 near Magnetawan First Nation	1964	current	
Highway 647	8.2	5.1	Highway 17 in Vermilion Bay	McIntosh Road at Blue Lake Provincial Park	1963	current	
Highway 650	7.6	4.7	Highway 112 in Dane	ONR crossing at Adams Mine	1964	current	
Highway 651	52.8	32.8	Highway 101	CPR crossing in Missanabie	1967	current	
Highway 652	149.9	93.1	Cochrane east limits at North Road	Kattawagami River bridge	1964	current	
Highway 654	22.9	14.2	Highway 534 near Nipissing	Highway 11 at Callander	1964	current	
Highway 655	74.7	46.4	Highway 101 in Timmins	Highway 11 near Driftwood	1965	current	
Highway 656	3.7	2.3	Highway 533 near Mattawa	Otto Holden Generating Station	1965	current	
Highway 657	6.0	3.7	Highway 105 in Ear Falls	Goldpines	1966	current	
Highway 658	25.3	15.7	Highway 17A (Kenora Bypass) in Kenora	CNR station in Redditt	1985	current	
Highway 661	4.6	2.9	Arthur Street in Gogama	Highway 144 – Sudbury, Timmins	1968	current	
Highway 663	5.3	3.3	Highway 11 / TCH west of Hearst	CNR station in Calstock	1972	current	
Highway 664	16.9	10.5	CNR crossing in Hudson	Highway 72 near Sioux Lookout	1975	current	Leo Bernier Memorial Highway
Highway 665	21.1	13.1	Highway 17 near Dryden	CNR station in Richan	1975	current	
Highway 667	35.3	21.9	Highway 129	Sultan Industrial Road in Sultan	1977	current	
Highway 668	13.3	8.3	Highway 11 near Cochrane	Greenwater Provincial Park	1983	current	
Highway 670	9.3	5.8	Highway 638 at Ophir	Nardi Road at Dunns Valley	1989	current	
Highway 671	68.7	42.7	Highway 17A (Kenora Bypass) in Kenora	Grassy Narrows First Nation	1988	current	
Highway 672	47.4	29.5	Highway 66 / TCH near Kirkland Lake	Highway 101 between Matheson and Quebec	1990	current	
Highway 673	8.0	5.0	Shoal Lake 40 First Nation	Highway 17 / TCH near Manitoba	1993	current	

== Tertiary roads ==
Number	Length (km)	Length (mi)	Southern or western terminus	Northern or eastern terminus	Formed	Removed	Notes
Highway 802	13.7	8.5	Burchell Lake	Kashabowie railway crossing	1962	current	
Highway 804	21.4	13.3	Manitou Falls Dam	Highway 105 near Ear Falls	1962	current	
Highway 805	52.5	32.6	Highway 539A at Sturgeon River	Obabika Lake	1962	current	
Highway 810	42.6	26.5	Highway 553 at Bull Lake	Richie Falls	1974	current	
Highway 811	59.0	36.7	Highway 527	Weaver River Bridge, near Kashishibog Lake	1976	current	

== 7000-series highways ==
The following is a list of the unsigned 7000-series highways as of October 2020. This list is compiled using the official MTO Provincial Highway Network and MTO Jurisdiction datasets.

Number	Road name	Length (km)	Length (mi)	Southern or western terminus	Northern or eastern terminus	District	Geographic township	Notes
Highway 7025	Shrine Hill Drive	0.8	0.5	Hillcrest Avenue	Highway 60	Renfrew	Killaloe, Hagarty and Richards	Original Highway 60 route
Highway 7036	Potter Road	4.3	2.7	4.3 km west of Highway 11	Highway 11	Cochrane	Newmarket	Original Highway 11 route
Highway 7037	Hanna Road	9.3	5.8	Highway 11	Highway 11	Cochrane	Hanna, Lamarche	Original Highway 11 route
Highway 7041	Main Street	1.3	0.8	Highway 6	Highway 6	Sudbury	Curtin	
Highway 7042	Old Wanup Road; Secord Road	28.9	18.0	Highway 7279 – Estaire	Highway 7279	Sudbury	Dill, Secord	Original Highway 69 route, later partially part of Highway 537
Highway 7044	Old Cartier Road	23	14.3	Highway 144 – Windy Lake	Highway 144 – Cartier	Sudbury	Cartier, Cascadden, Hart	Original Highway 544/144 route
Highway 7048	5 Mile Dock Road	1	0.6	Highway 11	end of road	Rainy River	Couchiching 16A	Access to 5 Mile Dock
Highway 7049	Lakeshore Road	2.3	1.4	Highway 17	CPR railway	Thunder Bay	Killraine	Old Highway 17 route? Not in AADT tables
Highway 7051	Wolfe Island Ferry	0	0.0	Kingston	Wolfe Island			
Highway 7057	Willard Lake Road	1.2	0.7	Highway 17	Willard Lake	Kenora	MacNicol	Portion of old Highway 17 route, also access to Willard Lake
Highway 7059	Longbow Lake Road	4.2	2.6	Highway 17 – Longbow Lake	Highway 17	Kenora	Kirkup	Old Highway 17 route
Highway 7087	E.C. Row Expressway	2.7	1.7	Highway 7902 (Ojibway Pkwy)	east of Huron Church Road	Windsor	Windsor	Part of Herb Grey Parkway project
Highway 7088	Havilland Shores Drive	1.6	1.0	1.6 km west of Highway 17	Highway 17	Algoma	Havilland	MTO network only shows bridge over Stokely Creek, AADT lists 1.6 km (0.99 mi) from Highway 17
Highway 7090	Harmony Beach Road	1.6	1.0	Highway 17	Highway 17	Algoma	Havilland	MTO network only shows bridge over Harmony River
Highway 7125	Clearwater Bay Road	0.5	0.3	Dead end	Highway 17	Kenora	Boys	Old Highway 17 route
Highway 7146	East Main Street	1.6	1.0	Wellington Street – Welland	Highway 140	Niagara	Welland	East Main Tunnel
Highway 7148	Beachwood Road	7.9	4.9	Highway 26	Highway 26 – Collingwood	Simcoe	Clearview	Old Highway 26 route
Highway 7149	Mosley Street, Nottawasaga 33/34 Sideroad	1.9	1.2	Vancise Court	Highway 7148	Simcoe	Clearview	Part of Highway 26 bypass project
Highway 7150	Mighton Court	0.2	0.1	Highway 26	dead end	Simcoe	Clearview	Service road for Wasaga Beach bypass
Highway 7162	Ontario Street	0.8	0.5	Highway 520	Highway 7298	Parry Sound	Armour	Old Highway 11 route
Highway 7172	Young Street	0.6	0.4	Highway 101	Railway Avenue – Foleyet RR station	Sudbury	Foleyet	
Highway 7182	Shebeshekong Road	18.6	11.6	Highway 559	Highway 69	Parry Sound	Shawanaga, Carling	Old Highway 69 route
Highway 7186	Thorold Stone Road	0.8	0.5	Highway 58	Thorold Townline Road (Niagara 70)	Niagara	Thorold	Eastern approach to Thorold Tunnel
Highway 7187	King Street East	2.3	1.4	Highway 8	Highway 401	Waterloo	Kitchener	Old Highway 8 route predating the Freeport Diversion extension to Highway 401.
Highway 7188	Katrine Road	7.7	4.8	Highway 592	Highway 520 – Burk's Falls	Parry Sound	Armour	
Highway 7189	Eastport Drive	2	1.2	QEW	Lakeshore Road	Hamilton, Halton	Hamilton, Burlington	Burlington Skyway detour
Highway 7191	Caledonia Bridge	0.2	0.1			Haldimand	Caledonia	Former Highway 6 route, bridge over Grand River
Highway 7195	Centre Street	0.6	0.4	former Highway 7	Dufferin Street (York 53)	York	Vaughan	Bypass to former Centre Street, built as part of Highway 407 project.
Highway 7236	Woodlawn Road	0.6	0.4	Brown Road	Highway 406	Niagara	Welland	Built as part of 406 extension. Previously continued to Seaway Mall.
Highway 7237	Main Street	0.9	0.6	Highway 48	Mostar Street	York	Stouffville	Old Highway 47, entrance to Stouffville
Highway 7242	McKenzie Station Road, Lakeshore Drive	8.6	5.3	Highway 11/17	Highway 11/17	Thunder Bay	Shuniah	Old Highway 11/17 route
Highway 7273	Upper James Street	0.2	0.1	Highway 6	200 m north of Highway 6	Hamilton	Mount Hope	approach to Highway 6 bypass
Highway 7274	Airport Road Connection	0.6	0.4	Highway 6	Airport Road, John C. Munro Hamilton International	Hamilton		Connects Highway 6 bypass to Hamilton Airport
Highway 7277	Arthur Street	8.6	5.3	Highway 130	Highway 61	Thunder Bay	Thunder Bay, Oliver-Paipoonge	AADT logs indicate not assumed. MTO network shows intersection with Highway 61 still assumed
Highway 7279	Estaire Road	19.6	12.2	Trout Lake Road	Highway 69	Sudbury	Dill, Burwash	Old Highway 69 route
Highway 7287	Shebeshekong Road	2.3	1.4	Highway 559	Highway 7909	Parry Sound	Carling	Old Highway 559 route pre 1982
Highway 7289	Lake Joseph Road	21.7	13.5	Highway 400 IC 189	Highway 141 – Brignall	Parry Sound	Seguin, Medora, Freeman	Old Highway 69 route
Highway 7290	Lake Joseph Road	2.6	1.6	Highway 141 – Hayes Corners	Highway 400 IC 213	Parry Sound	Seguin	Old Highway 69 route
Highway 7291	Muskoka Road	2.5	1.6	Highway 11 overpass	Highway 124	Parry Sound	Strong	Service road for west side of Highway 11
Highway 7292	Sinclair Lane	0.6	0.4	Dead end	Highway 7291	Parry Sound	Strong	Former Highway 124 route
Highway 7293	Green Road	0.1	0.1	Dead end	Highway 7294	Parry Sound	Strong	Former Highway 124 route
Highway 7294	Sunny Ridge Road	0.9	0.6	just ends	Highway 124	Parry Sound	Strong	Former Highway 11 route
Highway 7295	North Horn Lake Road	1.1	0.7	Sterling Creek Road	just ends, road continues	Parry Sound	Strong	Service road on west side of Highway 11
Highway 7296	Valley View Road	2.6	1.6	Robins Road	just ends, road continues	Parry Sound	Strong	Service road on east side of Highway 11
Highway 7297	South Service Road	0.9	0.6	Oke Drive	just ends, road continues	Parry Sound	Armour	Service road on west side of Highway 11
Highway 7298	Pickerel & Jack Lake Road, Barriedale Road	1.9	1.2	Highway 7162	just ends, road continues	Parry Sound	Armour	Service road on east side of Highway 11
Highway 7299	Burwash Farm Road	7.4	4.6	Dead end	Burwash Road	Sudbury		Old Highway 69 dead man's curve
Highway 7300	Indian Reserve Road	5.5	3.4	Sagamok territory boundary	Government Road (Massey)	Sudbury	Massey	Access to Sagamok Anishnawbek First Nation
Highway 7302	Erin Mills Parkway	1.2	0.7	Folkway Drive	Credit Valley Road	Peel	Mississauga	Erin Mills at Highway 403 interchange
Highway 7303	Winston Churchill Boulevard	1.1	0.7	Unity Drive	Credit Valley Road	Peel	Mississauga	Winston Churchill at Highway 403 interchange
Highway 7304	Flanders Road	0	0.0	Bridge		Rainy River		?
Highway 7310	Windy River bridge	0.1	0.1			Sudbury	Cascade	Old Highway 144/544?
Highway 7311	Renforth Drive	1.6	1.0	Eglinton Avenue West	Carlingview Drive	Toronto	Toronto	Renforth Drive over Highway 401
Highway 7902	Ojibway Parkway	0.3	0.2	Intersection with E.C. Row Expressway		Windsor	Windsor	Part of Herb Grey Parkway project
Highway 7908	Howard Avenue Diversion	0.9	0.6	Laurier Parkway	Highway 3	Windsor	Windsor	Part of Herb Grey Parkway project
Highway 7909	Nobel Road	6	3.7	N/O Lake Forest Drive	Highway 7287	Parry Sound	Carling McDougall	Old Highway 69 route
Highway 7910	Avro Arrow Road	1.5	0.9	Highway 7909	Highway 400	Parry Sound	McDougall	Built as part of Nobel Bypass

== See also ==
- List of controlled-access highways in Ontario
