= Women with Vision! =

Canadian magazine

- Holiday 2010/11 Edition
- Editor: Lynda Pogue
- CEO: Lorraine Leslie
- Design: Candice Lewis
- Staff writers: Janette Burke, Cathy Day, Meredith Deasley, Riva Glogowski, Paola Gucciardi, Dean Hollin, Deborah Johnson, Janet Kurasz, Annette Lavigne, Shannon Leone, Lorraine Leslie, Ron MacRae, Mary Ann Matthews, Donna Messer, Sally Michaud, Beth Nigh, Lesley Paul, Rose Peller, Lynda Pogue, Dr. Ben Pezik, Marj Sawars, Karen Sencich, Linda Thorn, Marilyn Wetston, Rick Ziemski
- Photographer: Shane MacLaughlan, Lorraine Leslie
- Categories: Women's magazine
- Frequency: Quarterly
- Publisher: Lorraine Leslie
- Founder: Lorraine Leslie
- Founded: 1998
- First issue: Fall 1998
- Company: Women With Vision! Inc.
- Country: Canada
- Based in: Collingwood – The Blue Mountains, Ontario
- Language: English
- Website: wwvmag.com

Women With Vision! is an English-language Canadian magazine of women's lifestyles and entrepreneurship.

The magazine and website cover a variety of women's interests, from fashion, life coaching, motivational speaking, beauty, home garden and decor, to current affairs, the arts, health, food and entertainment. It is distributed throughout the Georgian Triangle, which includes: Owen Sound, Meaford, Thornbury, Blue Mountains, Collingwood, Wasaga Beach, Stayner, Midland, Barrie, Cookstown and Alliston. It is also distributed at trade show and mailed through subscription by Canada Post to the Greater Toronto Area, the Golden Horseshoe and the United States.

Since 1998, the magazine has featured such notable woman as Tracy Moore, olympian Silken Laumann, Canadian Fashion design Linda Lundstrom, Breakfast Television's Jennifer Valentyne, 98.1 CHFI's Radio personality Erin Davis, singer-songwriter Amy Sky, and reporter Anne Mroczkowski.

The magazine celebrated its 13th anniversary in the fall of 2011.

== Recognition ==
In 2005, 2006, 2009 & 2010, the magazine and its Founder/Publisher Lorraine Leslie, were named as a nominee for the Royal Bank of Canada Canadian Woman Entrepreneur Award.
