= Pakwash Provincial Park =

Provincial park in Ontario, Canada

- IUCN category II (national park)
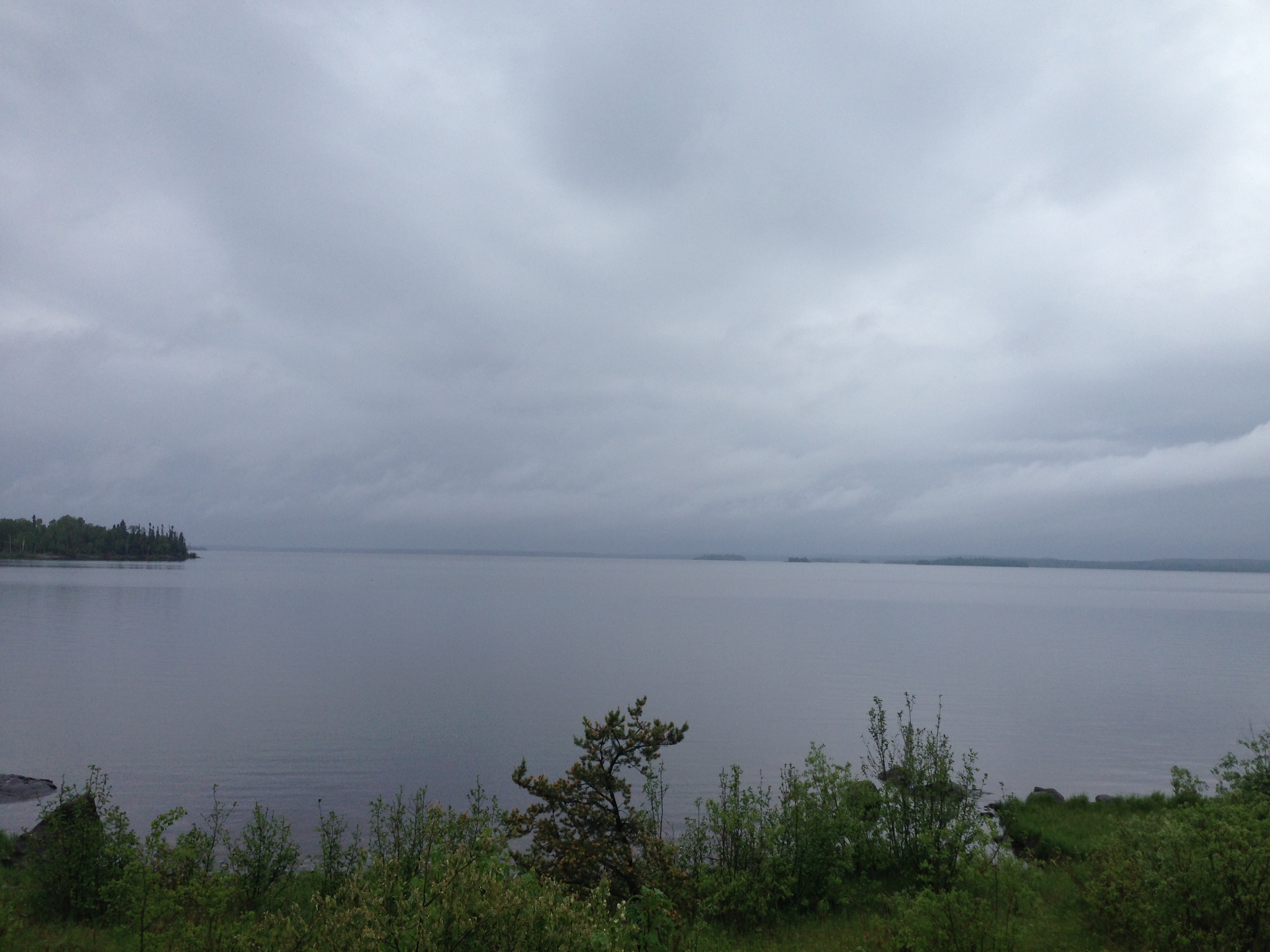
- Pakwash Lake, on which the provincial park is located

- Location within Ontario
- Interactive map of Pakwash Provincial Park
- Location: Kenora District, Ontario, Canada
- Nearest city: Ear Falls
- Coordinates: 50°47′02″N 93°26′42″W
- Established: 1967
- Visitors: 4,658 (in 2022)
- Governing body: Ontario Parks

Pakwash Provincial Park is a park in Northwestern Ontario, on the eastern shore of Pakwash Lake. It is located about 20 kilometres (12 mi) northwest of the town of Ear Falls.

Classified as a natural environment park, it offers camping and day use, including canoeing, fishing and swimming area from mid-May to mid-September. The park is reached by Ontario Highway 105 north from Vermilion Bay, Ontario.
