= Ontario Highway 805 =

Ontario provincial highway

Highway 805

Route information
- Maintained by Ministry of Transportation of Ontario
- Length: 52.5 km (32.6 mi)
- Existed: 1962–present

Major junctions
- South end: Highway 539A at Sturgeon River
- North end: Obabika Lake

Location
- Country: Canada
- Province: Ontario
- Municipalities: West Nipissing, Temagami, Unorganized Sudbury District

Highway system
- Ontario provincial highways; Current; Former; 400-series
← Highway 804	→ Highway 810
Former provincial highways
Highway 806 →

Tertiary Highway 805, commonly referred to as Highway 805, is a provincially maintained access road located within the Nipissing District. A northerly extension of Highway 539A, the road extends for approximately 52.5 kilometres (32.6 mi) to Obabika Lake, providing road access to the Chiniguchi Waterway, Obabika River, and Sturgeon River provincial parks.

== Route description ==
Highway 805 is a 52.5-kilometre (32.6 mi) route located northwest of North Bay, serving as a resource access road. There are no established communities along the highway, but it provides access to Sturgeon River Provincial Park and Obabika Lake Provincial Park via trails that branch off the route.

The route begins at a junction with the northern terminus of Highway 539A near the Sturgeon River, and travels north from that point. Due to the rugged terrain of the Canadian Shield, the winding highway crosses between Sudbury District and Nipissing District several times but generally serves as the boundary between the two. On an average day, only 100 vehicles travel along the route. Highway 805, like most other tertiary highways, is not maintained during the winter months.

== History ==
Highway 805 was designated in 1962 as a northward extension of Highway 539A, which was also designated that same year, extending into Sudbury District. It was initially an entirely unpaved road, and it remains unpaved to this day.

== Major intersections ==
The following table lists the major junctions along Highway 805, as noted by the Ministry of Transportation of Ontario.

Division	Location	km	mi	Destinations	Notes
Nipissing	West Nipissing	0.0	0.0	Highway 539A – River Valley	Highway 805 and Highway 539A share termini; northbound drivers must turn right onto Highway 805, while southbound drivers must turn left to continue on Highway 539A.
Sudbury	Pond Lake	52.5	32.6		
1.000 mi = 1.609 km; 1.000 km = 0.621 mi
