= Ontario Highway 125 =

Ontario provincial highway

Highway 125
- Highway 125 highlighted in red

Route information
- Maintained by the Ministry of Transportation of Ontario
- Length: 13.4 km (8.3 mi)
- Existed: November 23, 1955–present

Major junctions
- South end: Highway 105 south of Red Lake
- North end: Cochenour Ferry Dock

Location
- Country: Canada
- Province: Ontario

Highway system
- Ontario provincial highways; Current; Former; 400-series
← Highway 124	→ Highway 127
Former provincial highways
Highway 126 →

King's Highway 125, commonly referred to as Highway 125, is a provincially maintained highway in the Canadian province of Ontario. It is the second northernmost provincial highway in Ontario, behind Secondary Highway 599. The 13-kilometre (8.1 mi) route connects Highway 105 in Red Lake with Cochenour to the northeast. It was built in the early 1950s and assumed as a gravel-surfaced provincial highway in 1955. The route was paved in 1962 and remains generally unchanged today.

== Route description ==
Highway 125 is 13.4 kilometres (8.3 mi) long and travels from Highway 105 in Red Lake to the ferry docks in the Cochenour/McKenzie Island area. Beyond Cochenour and Balmertown, unmaintained forestry roads travel northwards to Pikangikum, and link to winter/ice roads that service communities even further north. The only provincially maintained highway that travels further north is secondary Highway 599 to Pickle Lake. The route travels through mostly forested areas along its length, skirting the edge of Balmertown. Only the final kilometre is urbanised.

Beginning at Highway 105 on the southern outskirts of the town of Red Lake, Highway 125 heads east into a heavily forested region in the Canadian Shield, eventually making a gradual turn to the north. After crossing the Chukuni River, the highway travels near the eastern shores of Red Lake as it provides access to waterfront properties. The highway curves northwest to pass between the Red Lake Golf Course and the western edge of Balmertown; Dickenson Road and Mine Road provide access into the mining town from the highway. The route then curves westward as it travels along the edge of the Red Lake Mine, one of the largest gold mines in the world. Continuing into forests heading west, the route travels south of the Red Lake Airport before curving to the northeast around the western side of the airport. At the entrance to the airport, Highway 125 abruptly turns northeast and into Cochenour. It passes through the town, although few properties have entrances along the road. The highway ends at the Cochenour Ferry Dock, where the Miss McKenzie II ferries passengers across to McKenzie Island; it is the only scheduled ferry service to an island in northwestern Ontario.

== History ==
Highway 125 was first built as a branch off of the relatively new Red Lake Road (Highway 105) in the mid-1950s to connect the town with the Red Lake Airport to the east. While the Department of Highways (DHO) committed to building a road to connect Red Lake with Balmertown, Cochenour, and the ferry to McKenzie Island in August 1947, repairs to highways elsewhere in the province delayed the onset of construction until the spring of 1949. The future route of the highway first appears on the 1952 official Ontario road map. Highway 125 was assumed by the DHO on November 23, 1955, travelling as far as the airport southeast of Cochenour. In 1957, the route was extended 1.1 km (0.68 mi) northwest to the Ferry docks to McKenzie Island in Cochenour. While initially gravel, the route was paved alongside Highway 105 in 1962 and 1963. Aside from a small realignment near the southern end, the route has remained unchanged since then.

== Major intersections ==
The following table lists the major junctions along Highway 125, as noted by the Ministry of Transportation of Ontario. The entire route is located in Kenora District.

Location	km	mi	Destinations	Notes
Red Lake	0.0	0.0	Highway 105 – Vermilion Bay	
Red Lake	3.5	2.2		Red Lake–Balmertown boundary
Balmertown	3.5	2.2		Red Lake–Balmertown boundary
Balmertown	12.3	7.6	Red Lake airport	
Balmertown	13.4	8.3	Cochenour Dock	Northernmost point in the King's Highway system
1.000 mi = 1.609 km; 1.000 km = 0.621 mi
