= Red Lake, Ontario =

Red Lake
- Municipality (single-tier)
- Municipality of Red Lake
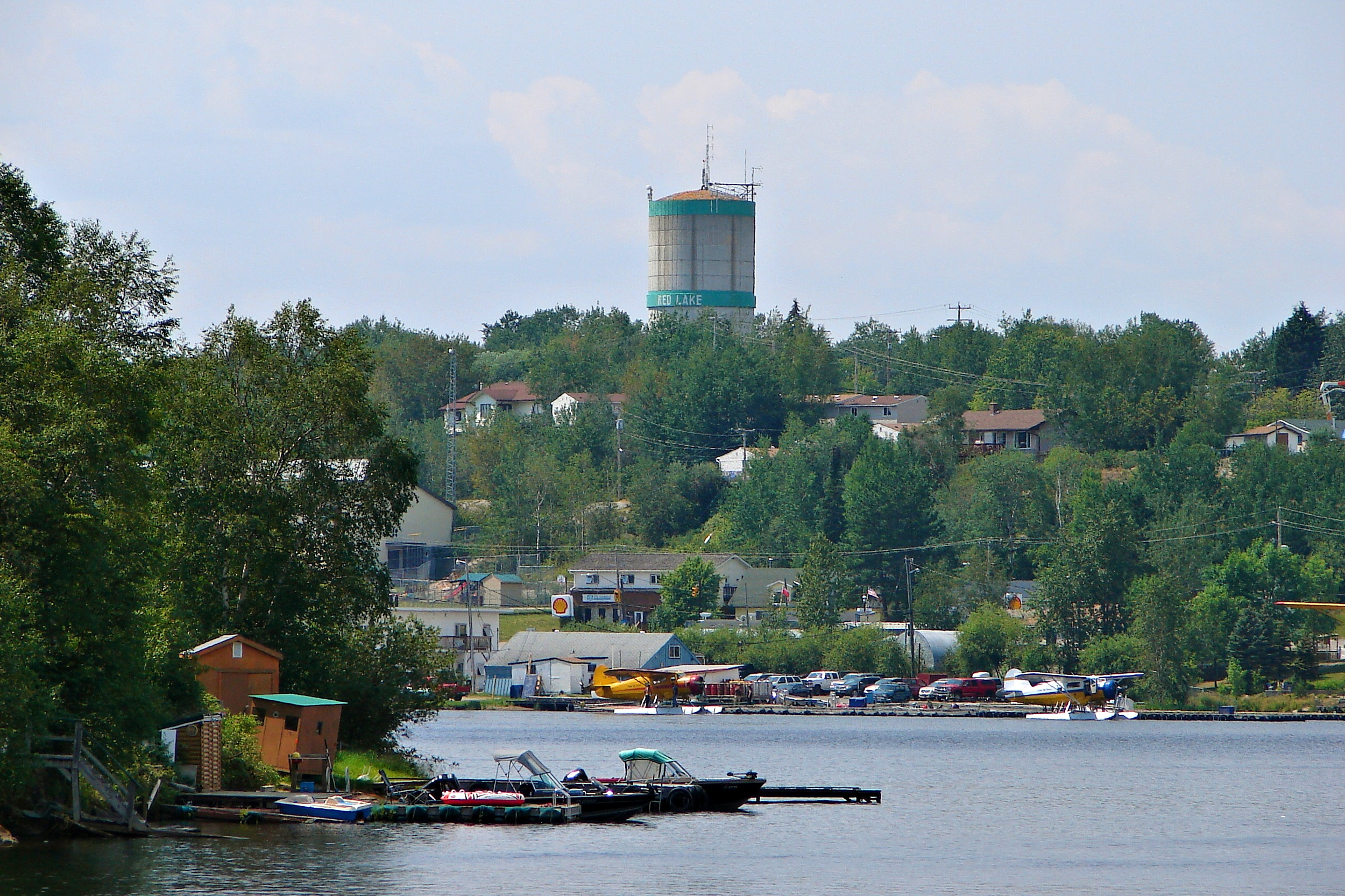

- Location within Ontario
- Coordinates: 51°01′07″N 93°48′34″W
- Country: Canada
- Province: Ontario
- District: Kenora
- Settled: 1926
- Formed: 1 July 1998

Government
  - Type: Town
  - Mayor: Fred Mota
  - MP: Eric Melillo (Conservative)
  - MPP: Sol Mamakwa (NDP)

Area
  - Land: 602.93 km^{2} (232.79 sq mi)
- Elevation: 385.90 m (1,266.1 ft)

Population (2021)
  - Total: 4,094
  - Density: 6.8/km^{2} (18/sq mi)
- Time zone: UTC−06:00 (CST)
  - Summer (DST): UTC−05:00 (CDT)
- Postal code FSA: P0V
- Area code: 807
- Website: www.red-lake.com

Red Lake is a municipality with town status in the Canadian province of Ontario, located 535 km (332 mi) northwest of Thunder Bay and less than 100 kilometres (62 mi) from the Manitoba border. The municipality consists of six small communities (Balmertown, Cochenour, Madsen, McKenzie Island, Red Lake, and Starratt-Olsen) and had a population of 4,094 people in the 2021 Canadian census.

Red Lake is an enclave within Unorganized Kenora District. The municipality was formed on 1 July 1998, when the former incorporated townships of Golden and Red Lake were merged along with a small portion of Unorganized Kenora District.

The name of the town comes from a local legend telling of two men from the Ojibwe tribe who stumbled across a large moose. The men proceeded to kill the moose, the blood of which drained into a nearby lake. The blood turned the lake's waters red in colour, ultimately giving the area its name. The name appears on the Bouchette map of 1875, and was officially approved on 7 December 1909.

== History ==
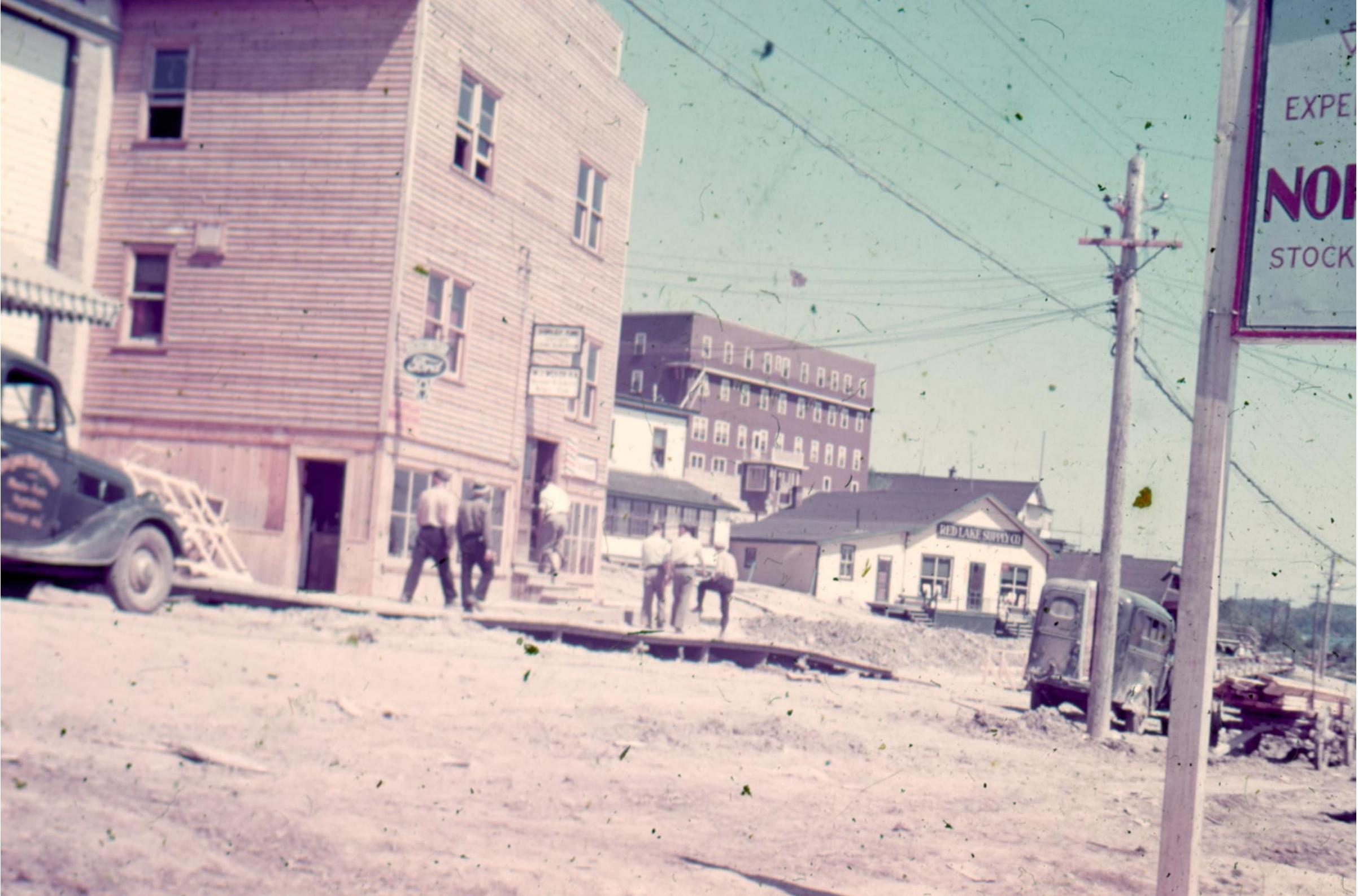
Red Lake downtown 1936. Red Lake Cafe( later Lakeview Bakery & Cafe), Mason-Goodison Block, McCuaig's Hotel & Red Lake Supply Store visible

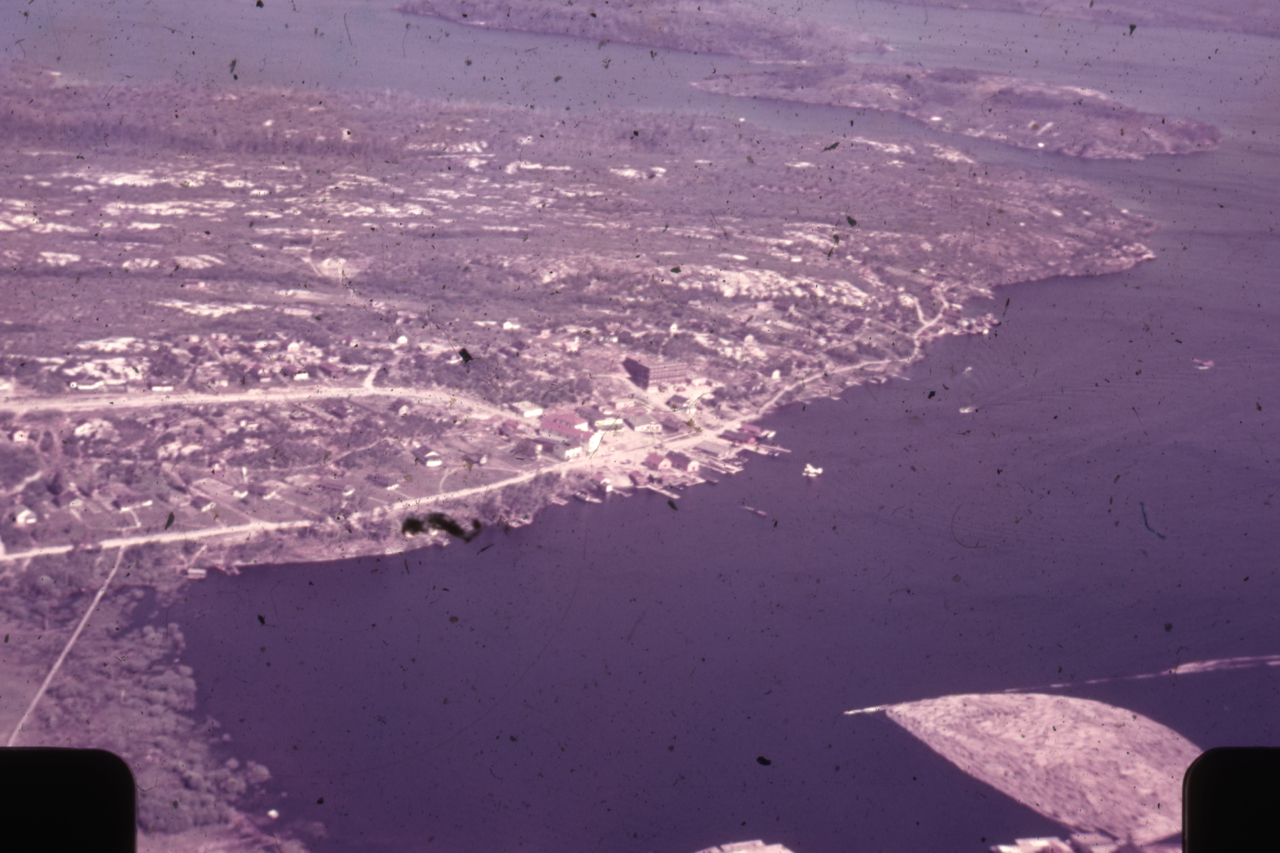
Aerial view Red Lake 1936. Log boom McDougall's Sawmill bottom right.

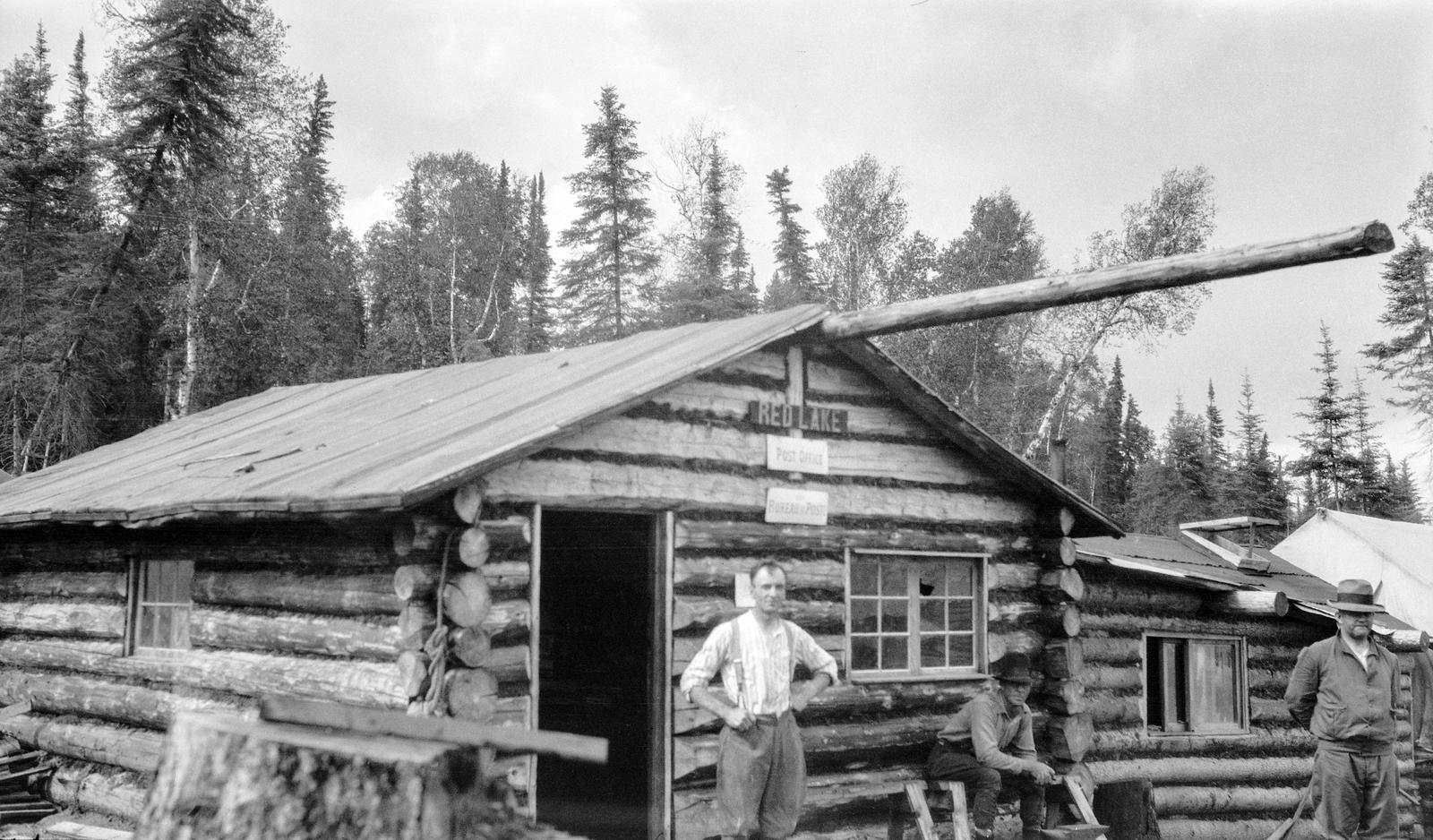
Red Lake Post Office 1927 William Brown Postmaster & Justice of Peace

According to archeological surveys in the area, it is proposed that First Nations people have inhabited the Red Lake area for 2,000 years. The first people to live on the land were members of the Sioux and Cree tribes. Ojibwe people began to inhabit the area approximately 200–300 years ago, effectively becoming the predominant people at the time.

In 1790, the Hudson's Bay Company established a trading post at Red Lake as an outpost of Osnaburgh House. The post, also known as Lake Rouge, Red Paint Lake, or Asa-tena-a-sat, operated periodically until 1806. In 1815, it was reopened and became the seat of HBC's Red Lake District, but in 1822, it closed again.

In 1897, the R.J. Gilbert expedition discovered gold and staked eight claims. These claims were surveyed by James Tyrrell, brother of Joseph Tyrrell, as well as a rock sample from an 8-metre (26 ft) shaft assayed 0.6 ounces gold per ton. However, the remoteness of the site precluded further exploration until 1922. A report by Department of Mines geologist and former head of geology at Queen's University Dr. Everend Lester Bruce indicated gold-bearing quartz was to be found in the greenstone around the lake. Fred Carroll then staked what would become the Cochenour-Willans Mine, and Herbert Tyrell staked what would become McMarmac Mine to the north of the Cochenour Willans mine. In 1925, Lorne and Ray Howey, along with brother-in-law George McNeely, plus W.F. Morgan staked claims which became the Howey and Hasaga Mines. Marius Madsen staked claims which became the Madsen Mine. The McDonough brothers staked the future Red Lake Gold Shore Mines.

The town experienced a sudden surge of economic, industrial and population growth with the development of the gold mines. By 1936, Red Lake's Howey Bay airport was the busiest in the world, with more flights landing and taking off per hour than any other.

By 1941, the Howey Mine had produced 421,592 ounces of gold. Hasaga Gold Mines produced 218,213 ounces over 14 years. McKenzie Red Lake Gold Mines produced 651,156 ounces by 1966, the Madsen Mine produced 2,416,609 ounces by 1976, and the Cochenour-Willans Mine produced 1,244,279 ounces by 1971. Jack Hammell developed Uchi Lake which produced 114,467 ounces by 1943. H. Dewitt Smith developed the Berens River, which produced 157,341 ounces by 1948. George Campbell started the second Red Lake gold rush in 1949 with the development of Campbell Red Lake Mines. It produced a peak of 300,472 ounces in 1993, the same year cumulative production reached 8,000,000 ounces. The Dickenson Red Lake Gold Mine had produced 3,000,000 ounces of gold by 1993.

In 1960, the Township of Red Lake was incorporated, and in 1985, the nearby Township of Golden was established.

In 1995 Goldcorp, the then owners of the Red Lake Mine, discovered that it contains the world's richest grade gold ore (two troy ounces of gold per metric ton). Shortly thereafter, the mine suffered through a four-year-long miners' strike. In 2004, the site was declared the richest gold mine in the world.

On July 1, 1998, the Townships of Red Lake and Golden, along with the unorganized territory governed by the Madsen local services board, were amalgamated and became the Municipality of Red Lake.

== Demographics ==
In the 2021 Census of Population conducted by Statistics Canada, Red Lake had a population of 4,094 living in 1,703 of its 1,899 total private dwellings, a change of −0.3% from its 2016 population of 4,107. With a land area of 602.93 km^{2} (232.79 sq mi), it had a population density of 6.8/km^{2} (17.6/sq mi) in 2021.

Canada census – Red Lake community profile

	2021	2016	2011
Population	4,094 (−0.3% from 2016)	4,107 (−12.1% from 2011)	4,670 (+3.5% from 2006)
Land area	602.93 km^{2} (232.79 sq mi)	610.06 km^{2} (235.55 sq mi)	610.38 km^{2} (235.67 sq mi)
Population density	6.8/km^{2} (18/sq mi)	6.7/km^{2} (17/sq mi)	7.7/km^{2} (20/sq mi)
Median age	38.4 (M: 38.0, F: 38.8)	38.0 (M: 37.7, F: 38.4)	38.1 (M: 38.3, F: 37.9)
Private dwellings	1,899 (total) 1,703 (occupied)	1,938 (total)	2,135 (total)
Median household income	$111,000	$106,411

References: 2021 2016 2011

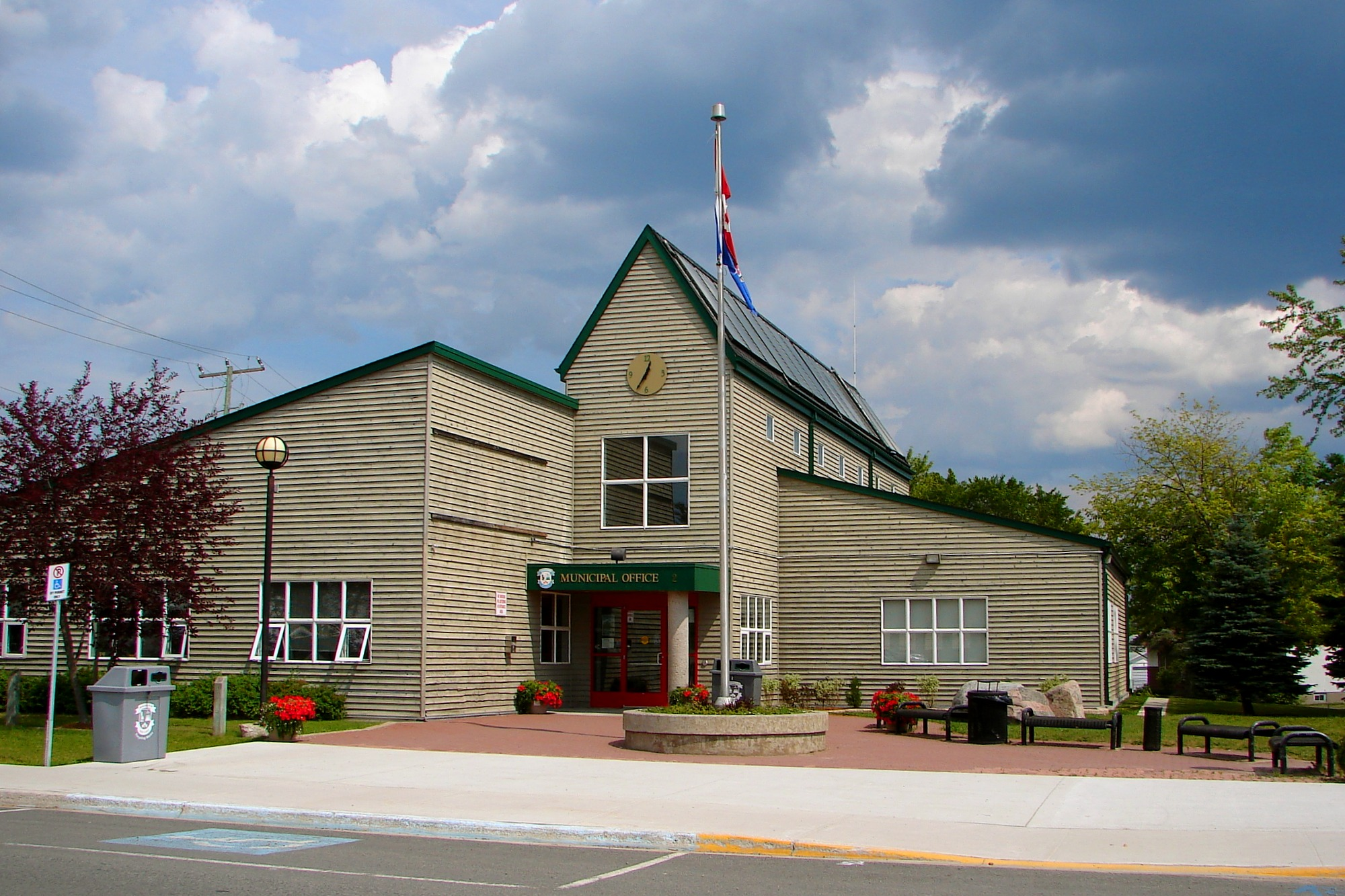
Town Hall

Historical census populations – Red Lake, Ontario

Year	Pop.	±%
1956	2,042	—
1961	2,419	+18.5%
1966	2,476	+2.4%
1971	2,170	−12.4%
1976	2,264	+4.3%
1981	2,120	−6.4%
1986	2,166	+2.2%

Year	Pop.	±%
1991	2,268	+4.7%
1996	2,277	+0.4%
2001	4,233	+85.9%
2006	4,526	+6.9%
2011	4,670	+3.2%
2016	4,107	−12.1%
2021	4,094	−0.3%

Population counts prior to 1998 are for Red Lake Township.
Source: Statistics Canada

== Climate ==
The climate of the area is a sharply continental warm-summer humid continental climate (Köppen Dfb). Snow usually starts falling around late October or early November, and starts melting around March but is not normally fully melted until late April, whilst late-season snow in May is not rare. This long winter is ideal for the local snowmobilers and for ice fishing, although the wind is often very cold and temperatures may drop to below −35 °C (−31 °F). During winter, residents and visitors participate in snowmobiling, ice fishing, skiing, ice hockey, and downhill sliding.

During the summer, the area experiences a moderate climate with little humidity, which is ideal for fishing, camping, boating, canoeing, and hiking.

Climate data for Red Lake Airport (1991–2020, extremes 1930–present)
Month	Jan	Feb	Mar	Apr	May	Jun	Jul	Aug	Sep	Oct	Nov	Dec	Year
Record high humidex	6.6	11.8	26.2	27.6	37.3	42.8	43.9	42.3	38.9	28.4	19.3	6.3	43.9
Record high °C (°F)	7.6 (45.7)	12.1 (53.8)	23.2 (73.8)	30.6 (87.1)	32.7 (90.9)	37.2 (99.0)	35.8 (96.4)	36.1 (97.0)	33.2 (91.8)	27.2 (81.0)	19.3 (66.7)	8.9 (48.0)	37.2 (99.0)
Mean daily maximum °C (°F)	−12.7 (9.1)	−8.4 (16.9)	−0.5 (31.1)	7.9 (46.2)	15.8 (60.4)	21.5 (70.7)	24.0 (75.2)	22.7 (72.9)	16.5 (61.7)	7.6 (45.7)	−1.6 (29.1)	−9.9 (14.2)	6.9 (44.4)
Daily mean °C (°F)	−18.1 (−0.6)	−14.9 (5.2)	−7 (19)	1.7 (35.1)	9.4 (48.9)	15.4 (59.7)	18.2 (64.8)	17.1 (62.8)	11.5 (52.7)	3.7 (38.7)	−5.5 (22.1)	−14.4 (6.1)	1.4 (34.5)
Mean daily minimum °C (°F)	−23.5 (−10.3)	−21.3 (−6.3)	−13.4 (7.9)	−4.7 (23.5)	3.0 (37.4)	9.3 (48.7)	12.4 (54.3)	11.5 (52.7)	6.4 (43.5)	−0.3 (31.5)	−9 (16)	−18.8 (−1.8)	−4 (25)
Record low °C (°F)	−45.6 (−50.1)	−45.7 (−50.3)	−39.6 (−39.3)	−28.8 (−19.8)	−12.2 (10.0)	−4.2 (24.4)	1.5 (34.7)	−1.4 (29.5)	−7.2 (19.0)	−15.9 (3.4)	−38.7 (−37.7)	−43.9 (−47.0)	−45.7 (−50.3)
Record low wind chill	−55.5	−54	−44.3	−32.2	−22.2	−4.6	0.0	0.0	−13.7	−20.5	−39.7	−50.7	−55.5
Average precipitation mm (inches)	26.0 (1.02)	16.2 (0.64)	28.7 (1.13)	36.5 (1.44)	82.5 (3.25)	97.7 (3.85)	112.1 (4.41)	92.9 (3.66)	84.2 (3.31)	68.9 (2.71)	43.6 (1.72)	32.3 (1.27)	721.5 (28.41)
Average rainfall mm (inches)	0.4 (0.02)	1.6 (0.06)	6.3 (0.25)	18.0 (0.71)	74.6 (2.94)	95.7 (3.77)	112.1 (4.41)	92.9 (3.66)	83.2 (3.28)	47.0 (1.85)	8.5 (0.33)	0.6 (0.02)	540.8 (21.29)
Average snowfall cm (inches)	36.2 (14.3)	21.5 (8.5)	27.6 (10.9)	21.1 (8.3)	8.7 (3.4)	0.3 (0.1)	0.0 (0.0)	0.0 (0.0)	1.3 (0.5)	25.0 (9.8)	44.6 (17.6)	43.8 (17.2)	230.1 (90.6)
Average precipitation days (≥ 0.2 mm)	14.6	10.1	11.1	9.4	14.1	16.0	16.0	14.4	15.3	15.7	15.5	16.4	168.5
Average rainy days (≥ 0.2 mm)	0.59	0.86	2.9	5.7	13.1	15.9	16.0	14.4	15.0	11.3	3.0	0.95	99.6
Average snowy days (≥ 0.2 cm)	15.8	11.2	10.6	5.4	1.9	0.05	0.0	0.0	0.91	7.1	15.2	17.8	85.9
Average relative humidity (%) (at 15:00 LST)	69.3	59.7	52.7	44.8	48.7	53.7	56.1	56.5	62.3	68.0	74.8	75.8	60.2
Mean monthly sunshine hours	103.6	125.0	178.9	224.8	253.8	246.9	269.5	254.3	168.3	110.0	65.1	82.1	2,082.2
Percentage possible sunshine	39.5	44.4	48.7	54.3	52.7	50.0	54.1	56.7	44.3	33.0	24.2	33.1	44.5
Source: Environment and Climate Change Canada (sun 1981–2010)

== Economy ==
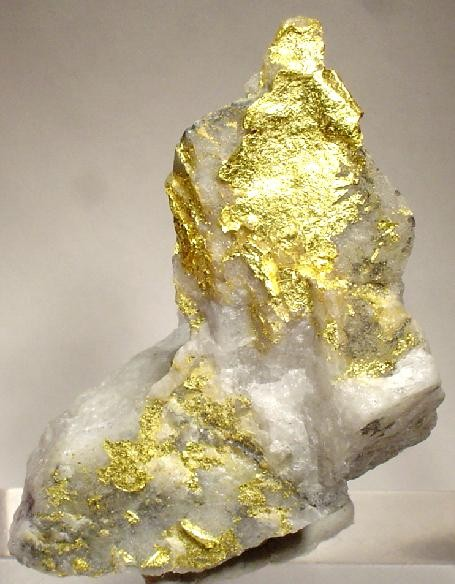
Gold in quartz from the Red Lake Mine

The three primary sources of employment in Red Lake are support services for the numerous mines surrounding the town, small scale logging and a tourism sector specializing in hunting and fishing. It is known as the "Norseman Capital of the World", referring to the Noorduyn Norseman aircraft which played a significant role in the development of the area.

== Transportation ==
Red Lake is located at the northern terminus of Highway 105, and is the northernmost town in Ontario that is located on a primary King's Highway. A short spur route, Highway 125, extends northerly from Highway 105 to the communities of Balmertown, Cochenour and McKenzie Island, while Highway 618 extends westerly from Highway 105 to the communities of Madsen and Starratt-Olsen. Only one highway in the province, the secondary Highway 599, extends further north than the terminus of Highway 125.

The town acts as a cargo, passenger, and tourism hub for Northwestern Ontario. With Pickle Lake, Red Lake services over twenty northern fly-in communities. Today, Red Lake Airport is a "mini-hub" facilitating travel to and from all northern communities in Northwestern Ontario. Four airway companies take advantage of Red Lake's close proximity to the northern communities. North Star Air, Bearskin Airlines, Superior Airways, and Wasaya Airways all operate out of "YRL".

== Attractions ==
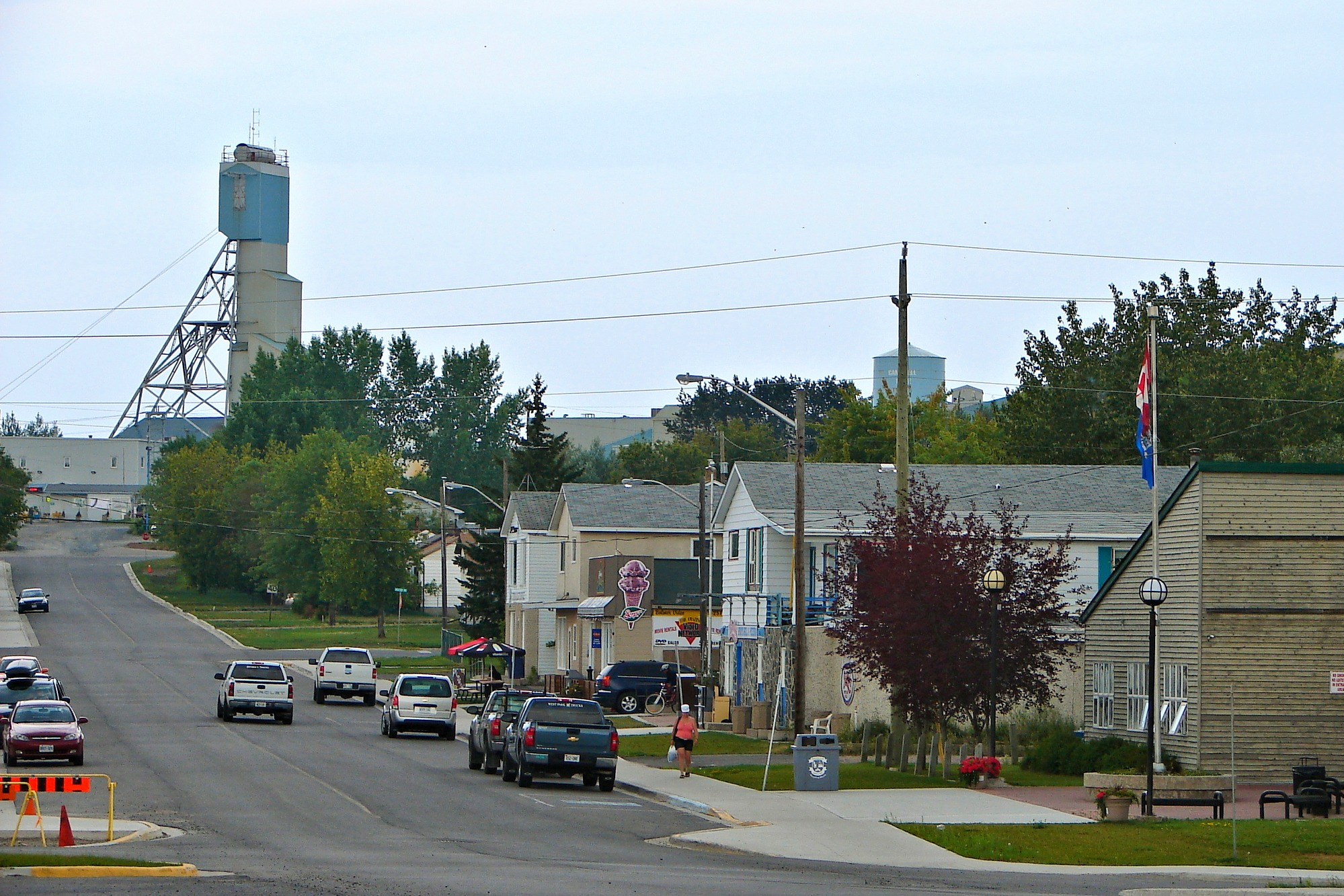
Balmertown

Red Lake has the Red Lake Regional Heritage Centre, a museum of local art and history, and is close to Woodland Caribou Provincial Park and Pakwash Provincial Park. Some local restaurants are Antonio's, Spud&Dog, and The Howey. Red Lake is a prime location for summer sport fishing, as the lake contains several types of fish including walleye, northern pike, lake trout, whitefish and sauger. Other popular recreational summer activities include golfing at the Red Lake Golf and Country Club, swimming at Rahill and Kinsmen Beach, and even exploring the many bays and arms of Red Lake by boat.

Hunting is another activity in the region that attracts tourism, especially during the fall season. Red Lake is known for its abundance of game in the District, including moose, ruffed grouse, spruce grouse, duck, and bear. Some citizens even participate in the fur industry with established trapping lines interspersed throughout the local forests. The gray wolf, white-tailed deer, red fox, beaver, and many bird species also inhabit the area.

== Notable people ==
- Philip Beachy (born 1958 in Red Lake), biochemist
- Cliff Caines, documentary filmmaker who profiled the community in his 2015 film A Rock and a Hard Place
- Kristen Hager, television actress
- Karl Brooks Heisey, mining engineer
- Linda Lundström, clothing designer
- Norval Morrisseau, renowned Anishinabe artist sometimes called the "Father of Woodland Art"
- Eric Radford, pairs figure skater with Meghan Duhamel, 2-time World champion (2015, 2016), 2-time Olympian (2014, 2018), Olympic Team Silver medallist (2014), Olympic Team Gold medallist (2018), and individual pairs Olympic Bronze medallist (2018)
- Eleonore Schönmaier, poet and author

== Media ==
=== Print ===
- The Northern Sun News was a weekly broadsheet newspaper serving Red Lake and the surrounding Northern Communities. It had a circulation of 1600. On 28 August 2015, it announced via Facebook that its last issue would be 2 September 2015.

=== Radio stations ===
- FM 90.5 - CBEA-FM, CBC Radio One
- FM 97.1 – CKDR-FM-5, adult contemporary radio

=== Defunct radio stations ===
- AM 1340 - CKRE was a former rebroadcaster of the now currently operating CKDR-FM in Dryden. It originally applied for 99.5 FM in 1980.
- FM 95.1 - CFRI-FM was a radio station in Red Lake that received approval in 2000 from the CRTC to operate a new FM community radio station on the frequency of 95.1 MHz with an extension of time limit to get the station on the air in 2001. Its uncertain if the station had ever launched or when it left the air. No known license renewals were issued for CFRI-FM Red Lake.

== See also ==
- Cobalt silver rush
- Greenstone, Ontario
- Hemlo, Ontario
- Kirkland Lake, Ontario
- Matachewan, Ontario
- Porcupine Gold Rush
