= Ontario Highway 539A =

Ontario provincial highway

Highway 539A

Route information
- Maintained by the Ministry of Transportation of Ontario
- Length: 5.8 km (3.6 mi)
- Existed: 1958–present

Major junctions
- Southeast end: Highway 539 in River Valley
- Northwest end: Highway 805 at the Sudbury–Nipissing boundary

Location
- Country: Canada
- Province: Ontario
- Counties: Nipissing District
- Towns: West Nipissing, River Valley

Highway system
- Ontario provincial highways; Current; Former; 400-series
← Highway 539	→ Highway 540

Secondary Highway 539A, commonly referred to as Highway 539A, is a provincially maintained secondary highway in the Canadian province of Ontario, located within Nipissing District. Commencing at a junction with Highway 539 in the community of River Valley, the highway formerly extended northwesterly for 13.1 kilometres (8.1 mi) to a point near where the Sturgeon River crosses the boundary between Nipissing and Sudbury District at Glen Afton; at this point, the roadway turned northward and continues as Highway 805. The route was later truncated, and now extends for only 5.8 kilometres, with the remainder of the former route having been renumbered as an extension of Highway 805.

== Route description ==
Highway 539A begins at a junction with its parent route, Highway 539. Drivers on Highway 539 must turn to remain on that route, while southbound Highway 539A becomes eastbound Highway 539 to Field. Northbound, drivers round a long curve and enter the community of River Valley. The highway crosses the railbed of a former rail spur, exits the community and crosses the Temagami River. The highway gradually curves to the northwest and hugs the bank of the Sturgeon River.

== History ==
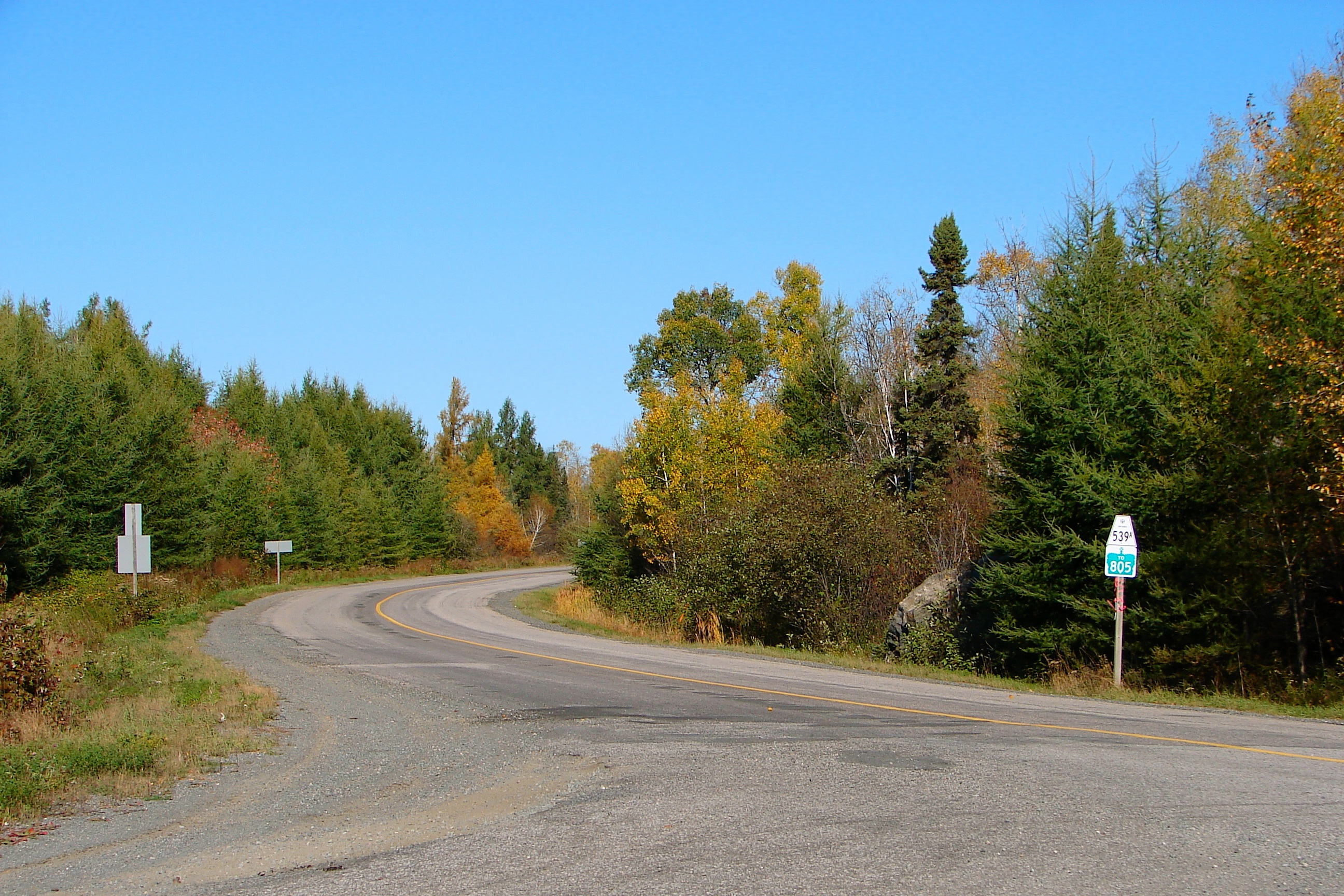
Hwy 539A near River Valley

Although Highway 539 was designated in 1956, and the road that is now Highway 539A existed, the route was not designated at that time. The route first appears on the 1958 Official Road Map of Ontario as a short spur of Highway 539 into River Valley. In 1962, Highway 805 was designated within Sudbury District. In order to connect it with the rest of the provincial highway network, Highway 539A was extended northwest to the Nipissing – Sudbury district boundary. It still follows this same routing today.

== Major intersections ==
The following table lists the major junctions along Highway 539A, as noted by the Ministry of Transportation of Ontario. The entire route is located in Nipissing District.

Location	km	mi	Destinations	Notes
River Valley	0.0	0.0	Highway 539	
West Nipissing	5.8	3.6	Highway 805	Sudbury–Nipissing boundary
1.000 mi = 1.609 km; 1.000 km = 0.621 mi
