= Linda Lundström =

Canadian fashion designer

Linda Lundström (born 1951) is a Canadian fashion designer.

== Life and career ==
Lundström was born in Red Lake, Ontario, and raised in the nearby hamlet of Cochenour. When she was a child, her mother bought her a sewing machine, and she learned to make clothes for herself and her friends. She studied fashion at Sheridan College in Oakville before receiving a scholarship to travel to Europe to continue her studies.

Upon her return, she started a fashion design business in Toronto in 1974. Her fashion line was sold in three flagship boutiques in addition to retailers across North America, including Hudson's Bay Company and Nordstrom. She is most well known for the LAPARKA, a winter coat. She is the recipient of numerous awards, including three honorary Ph.Ds. She was named to the Order of Ontario in 1995, and received the Queen Elizabeth II Diamond Jubilee Medal in 2012. She has been recognized for championing economic growth in First Nations communities and using sustainable manufacturing practices.

The Great Recession forced her to file for protection from bankruptcyin January 2008. After her business was acquired by private investment firm Elgner Group, she was able to start designing again but resigned after 17 months, and in 2012, Lundström introduced a new fashion line called "L designed by Linda Lundström".

In 2017, Lundström, along with her two daughters Mosha Lundström Halbert and Sophie Lundström Halbert, launched Therma Kōta, an outerwear brand.
