= Madsen Mine =

Gold mine in Ontario, Canada

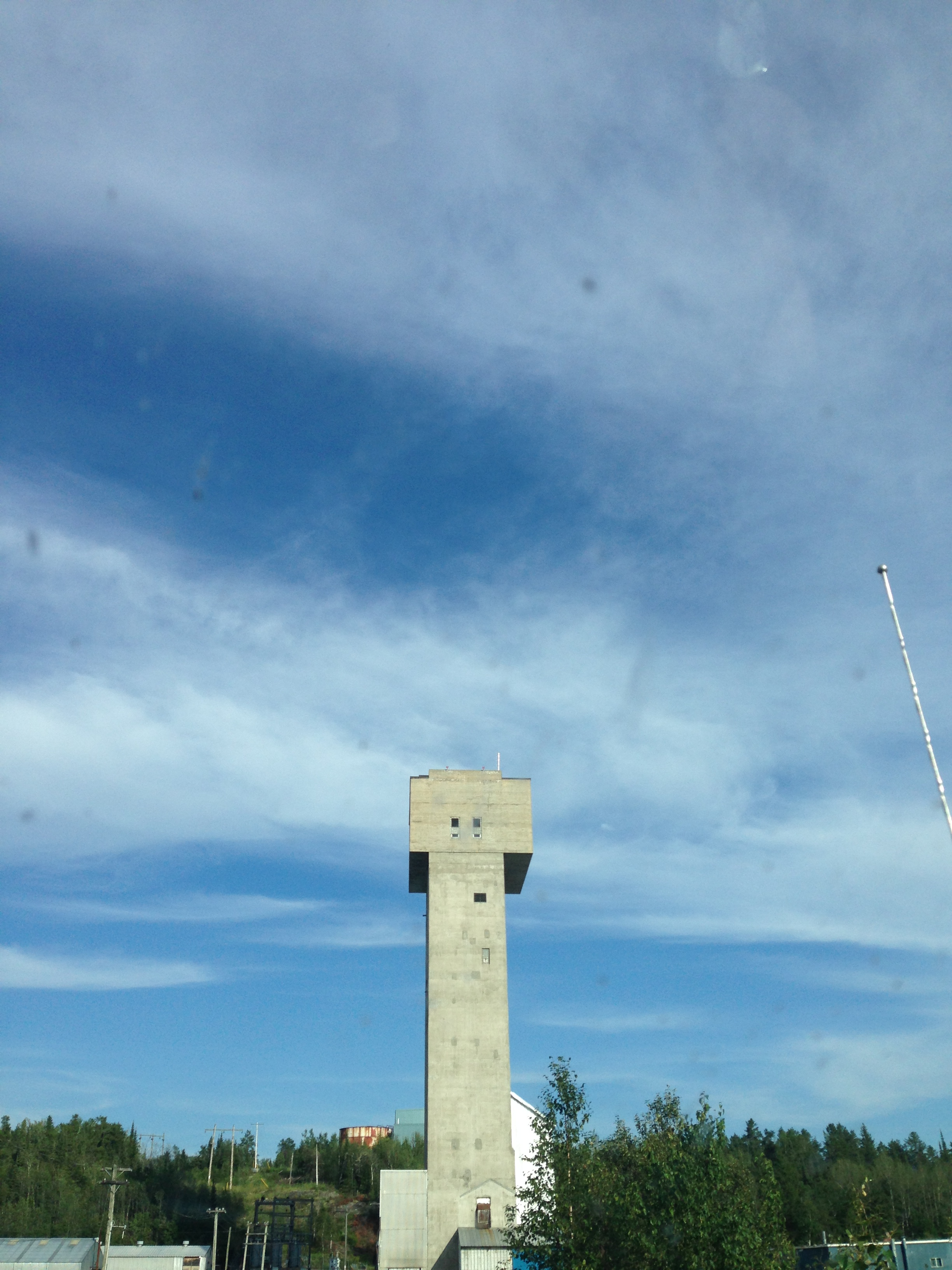
- The headframe of the Madsen Mine

- Location in Canada
- Location: Ontario, Canada; 50°58′02″N 93°55′04″W
- Products: Gold
- Opened: 1938
- Active: 1938 - 1976; 1997 - 1999; 2021 - 2022; 2025 - present
- Company: West Red Lake Gold Mines
- Website: Madsen Mine

The Madsen Mine is a Canadian underground gold mine, currently owned by West Red Lake Gold Mines. In May 2025, the mine re-opened and began production. The mine was also previously operational from: 1938 to 1976; 1997 to 1999; and 2021 to 2022.

== History ==
In 1934, Marius Madsen staked claims of the property of the future Madsen Mine for the Falcon Gold Syndicate. On March 8, 1935, realizing the value of the property, Madsen founded Madsen Red Lake Gold Mines Ltd. and bought the claims. Having problem with financing the problem, Marius Madsen worked with Joe McDonough, who helped promote the mine and raise capital for development. McDonough was made president of the company. Mine production began on 1938. In 1974, the mine was acquired by Bulora Corp. Ltd., but was closed two years later, in 1976, due to falling gold prices and increased operating costs of labour and supplies.

In 1980, the mine was sold to E.R. Rowland. Having also acquired the nearby Starratt-Olsen mine, Rowland combined the two properties. Red Lake Buffalo Resources acquired the combined property in 1990, and then later changed the company's name to Madsen Gold Corp. In 1997, the mine restarted operations. In 1998, Claude Resources acquired Madsen Gold Corp. and its Madsen Mine. Operations were stopped in 1999.

In 2014, the mine was sold to Laurentian Goldfields, which later renamed itself to Pure Gold Mining. Pure Gold restarted commercial operations at the mine in August 2021. However, the company failed to produce enough gold to match their projections. Operations at the Madsen mine were suspended a year later, on October 24, 2022, and Pure Gold was granted creditor protection on October 31. Pure Gold and the Madsen mine would be acquired by West Red Lake Gold Mines, with the acquisition being completed on June 16, 2023. On January 2, 2025, West Red Lake Gold announced that they would restart the Madsen Mine, with production beginning later in 2025. Production at the mine was restarted in May 2025.

== See also ==
- List of gold mines in Canada
- List of mines in Ontario
- Geology of Ontario
