= Madsen, Ontario =

Coordinates: 50.967655°N 93.922223°W

Madsen is an unincorporated community in Ontario, Canada. It is recognized as a designated place by Statistics Canada.

== Demographics ==
In the 2021 Census of Population conducted by Statistics Canada, Madsen had a population of 153 living in 67 of its 74 total private dwellings, a change of 4.1% from its 2016 population of 147. With a land area of 52.74 km^{2} (20.36 sq mi), it had a population density of 2.9/km^{2} (7.5/sq mi) in 2021.

== See also ==
- List of communities in Ontario
- List of designated places in Ontario
