= Ear Falls =

- Township (single-tier)
- Township of Ear Falls
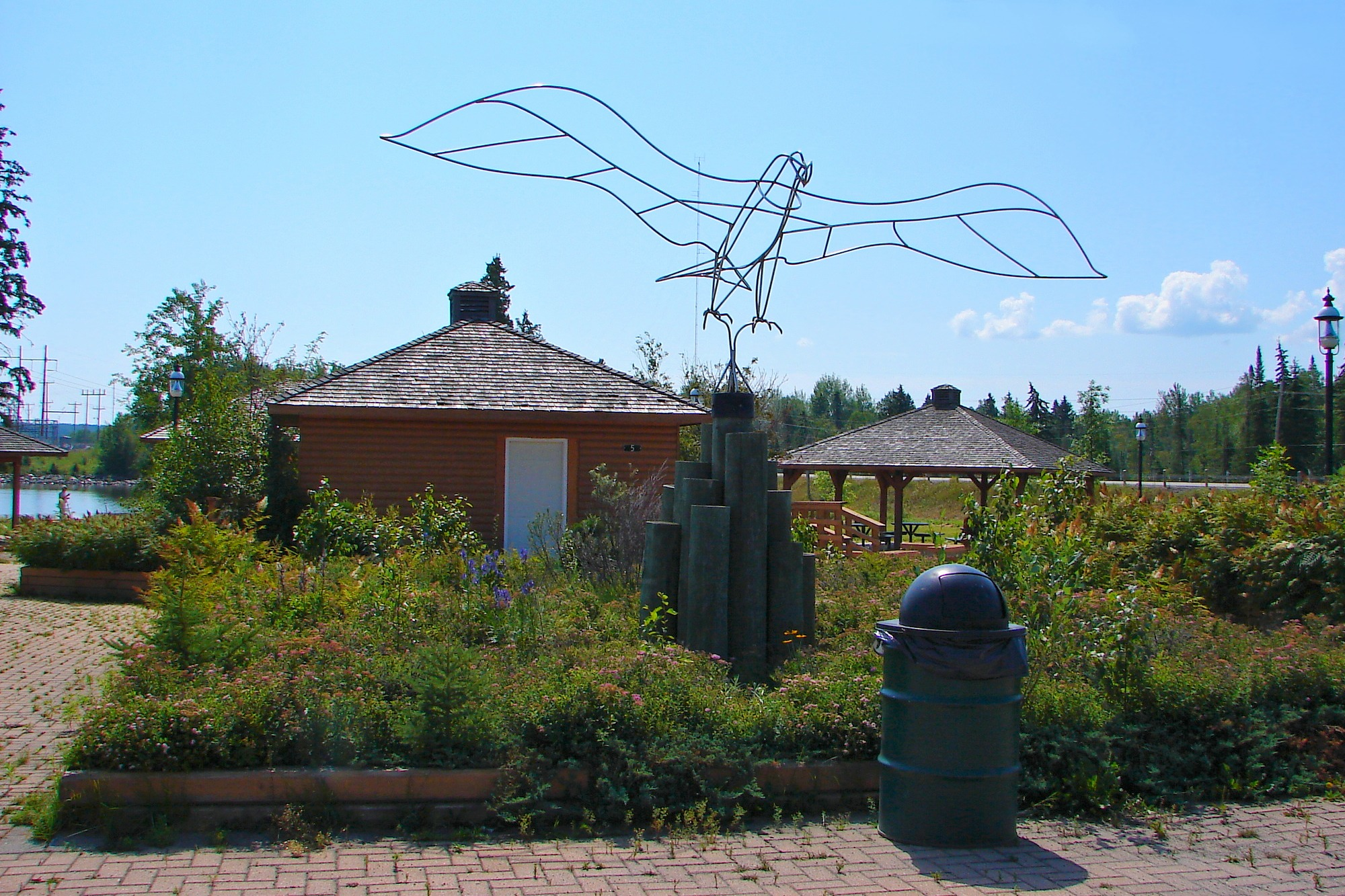

- Location within Ontario
- Coordinates: 50°38′N 93°13′W
- Country: Canada
- Province: Ontario
- District: Kenora
- Settled: 1937
- Incorporated: 1970

Government
  - Mayor: Kevin Kahoot
  - Federal riding: Kenora—Kiiwetinoong
  - Prov. riding: Kiiwetinoong

Area
  - Land: 336.69 km^{2} (130.00 sq mi)
- Elevation: 360.90 m (1,184.1 ft)

Population (2021)
  - Total: 924
  - Density: 32.7/km^{2} (85/sq mi)
- Time zone: UTC-6 (CST)
  - Summer (DST): UTC-5 (CDT)
- Postal Code FSA: P0V
- Area code: 807
- Website: www.ear-falls.com

Ear Falls is a township located in Northwestern Ontario, Canada, on the banks of the English River, Lac Seul, Pakwash Lake and Wenesaga Lake. It is located along Highway 105, 100 kilometres (62 mi) north of Highway 17 and Vermilion Bay, about halfway between Highway 17 and Red Lake, or about 480 kilometres (300 mi) northwest of Thunder Bay.

Ear Falls is entirely surrounded by Unorganized Kenora District. The closest community to Ear Falls is Wabauskang First Nation, followed by the unincorporated community of Perrault Falls. It was first incorporated as an Improvement District in 1970 out of unorganized area.

== Etymology ==
There are different versions of how the settlement was named after the eponymous falls. The following are three versions of the story found in the museum archives:

1. Ear Falls was once known as Otahwaka Powitek to the Ojibwa band. This area was believed to be haunted by the spirit of a giant beaver which lived between the upper and lower falls. It was said that when the beaver was swimming, its ears could be seen rising and falling in the foaming water.
2. Legends have produced the names of many local spots, and one such name is Ear Falls. According to information provided by Gerald Bannatyne, a collector of artifacts, aboriginal people living on Goose Island were travelling past the rapids which are now known as Ear Falls, when they saw something that frightened them. They brought more men back with them to investigate. The 'monster' turned out to be a large tree root stuck in the rocks. The spot became known as 'Big Ear', which later became 'Ear Falls'.
3. Many, many years ago, local aboriginals had named Ear Falls Otahwaka Powitek because the water had worn the rock ledge at the lip of the falls roughly in the shape of a human ear.

The early French fur traders' name for the falls was Portage D'Oreille, or literally speaking, "carrying place of the ear". Upper Ear Falls, about 1.5 miles upstream, was drowned out when the lake level was raised some 16 feet (4.9 m) when the power dam came into operation, and nothing of it remains today except dangerous ripple rapids with a very strong current.

== History ==
=== Fur trade (1680–1880) ===
The beginning of the 17th century marked the arrival of French explorers to Northwestern Ontario and the beginning of the fur trade. The fur trade would remain the predominant business in the North for the next 200 years. The Hudson's Bay Company and the North West Company were rivals for most of the fur trade era. In 1821 both companies united, and posts were set up in the Ear Falls area on Lac Seul and Red Lake. Remains of these posts could be seen along the lakes in the area until the 1920s when the construction of the Lac Seul Dam caused a rise in the water levels and the remnants of the fur trade were covered with water.

The arrival of the railway in the 1880s began the decline of the fur trade. The Hudson's Bay Company shifted the focus of their posts to meet the needs of the new residents in the area: supplies for miners, lumbermen and settlers were sold at posts and stores in the Ear Falls area.

=== The railway era (1880–1916) ===
Following the construction of the Canadian Pacific Railway between 1870 and 1885, geologist and surveyors mapped Northwestern Ontario. By 1923, the Canadian National Railway was extended through the boundary of West Patricia with two lines: The Grand Trunk Railway and the Canadian Northern Railway. The railway opened the area to the development of timber, fish and mineral resources.

Development of Ear Falls did not occur immediately with the arrival of the railways as the lines were not close to the town, but occurred when the fur trade was altered as a result of the railway. Supplies were brought in and furs were taken out at the closest point to the rail. Warehouses were erected for shipping and receiving at Hudson (near Sioux Lookout). A steamer was placed on Lac Seul to enhance freight operations.

=== Red Lake and Central Patricia gold developments (1925–present) ===
The discovery of gold at Red Lake in 1925 initiated a rise in development throughout areas north of the railways. In the following years, thousands of claims were staked from Favorable Lake in the west to Pickle Lake in the east. Transportation routes, settlements and power supplies were developed to support the mining industry. It was the success of the gold mines which led to the shaping of the region's transportation, land use and settlements patterns. It was also the Red Lake Gold developments that provided incentive for settlers to locate to Ear Falls. The falls were located on the primary freight route from Hudson to Red Lake.

A generating station was constructed by Ontario Hydro in order to supply power to the mines at Red Lake, which led to the creation of the Hydro colony at Ear Falls. By the 1930s, Ear Falls had replaced Goldpines as the main settlement in the area. When bush planes became more affordable to transport goods, Ear Falls became the jump off point to Red Lake.

=== Hydro power development ===
During the 1920s, the Federal Government considered proposals to regulate the water in the Winnipeg River. By constructing the dam at the head of Lac Seul, the lake would become a large reservoir, retaining the spring run-off for use by power developments downstream on both the English and Winnipeg River systems. Lower Ear Falls was the selected location for the Lac Seul dam.

The construction of the dam at Ear Falls began in the spring of 1928, but not before camp buildings were constructed along the east side of the river. A coffer dam, two earth dikes, excavation and preparations of the foundations of the dam were also completed before construction began. The pouring of concrete commenced in November and work on the dam continued throughout the winter months.

The conservation dam was an economical means to create a storage basis for power developments in both Ontario and Manitoba. The construction of the dam had a dramatic impact on the lake due to a rise in water levels. Upper Ear Falls was drowned out by the dam, and well known landforms around the lake disappeared under the water level.

Ontario Hydro played an instrumental role in the development of Ear Falls. The company realized that many of its generating stations in Northern Ontario were situated in isolated areas. In order to retain operators for these plants, the company recognized that they would need to supply quality housing, schools, recreation halls, stores, hospitals and other buildings. The company also supplied provisions for water supply, electrical services, sewage disposal and fire protection. In 1937, a colony was constructed at Ear Falls.

Ontario Power Generation constructed the Obishikokaang Waasiganikewigamig/Lac Seul Generating Station (GS) beginning its commercial operation on 18 February 2009. OPG and the Lac Seul First Nation have formed a historic partnership that will see the First Nation own 25 per cent of the station. The station has dual names. The Ojibway name, Obishikokaang Waasiganikewigamig, means "White Pine Narrows electricity generating building". White Pine Narrows is the original Ojibway name for the area where the station is located. The English name of the plant is Lac Seul GS. The Lac Seul GS is located adjacent to Ontario Power Generation's (OPG) existing Ear Falls GS on the English River in Ear Falls. The facilities are located at the outlet of the Lac Seul reservoir on the English River. This station consists of one 12.5 MW double regulated pit turbine and will operate under a rated net head of 9.78 metres and flow of 139.45 cubic metre per second. It will use the excess water flow that has historically been passed by the existing Ear Falls GS. This water will now be used to generate clean, renewable energy. The combined nameplate capacity of the two facilities is 29.3 MW. The existing 4-unit Ear Falls GS was placed in service between 1930 and 1948. Each unit has two intakes. The Ear Falls GS powerhouse is connected to the 185-metre long Lac Seul Conservation Dam which is owned by the province of Ontario and operated by OPG. The dam is used to regulate water levels and flows for the purposes of power production in Ontario and Manitoba. It is estimated these facilities will generate approximately 185,000 megawatt-hours of renewable energy per year.

=== Mining and forestry revival (1945–present) ===
During the Second World War, there was a 50% decline in the gold mining industry in the Patricia District. With the end of the war and the opening of Highway 105 in 1947, the mining industry in the region was renewed. Ear Falls was now linked by road to the Trans-Canada Highway and to Red Lake.

At this time, the Chukuni Lumber Company was operating at Snake Falls. The operation consisted of a saw mill, a small box mill, and about a dozen houses lining the trail that ran through the lumber yards to the saw mill. The children of the workers were bussed to school in Ear Falls. By 1954, plans were made to move the mill operations to Ear Falls. The workers constructed houses north of the highway, along the hydro line. The Chukuni Lumber Company was eventually purchased by Colenso of Red Lake Road in 1968 and the Ear Falls sawmill operations were closed. Colenso was, in turn, sold to the Dryden Paper Company in 1972.

In the early 1950s, ore deposits were discovered on Bruce Lake north of Ear Falls. In 1966 Stelco, an iron pelletizing plant, was developed in the area. The Canadian Northern Railway constructed a line to the mine which crossed highway 105 to the south of Ear Falls and the outlet of Lac Seul to the east of the dam. A new town site containing 100 residential units was developed in Ear Falls North of the dam. Today the mine is closed and the rail line has been abandoned.

On 14 May 1998, the Ear Falls Sawmill opened to produce dimensional lumber (Premium, Stud, #3 & Btr, Economy; 2x3, 2x4, 2x6; 6' to 9' length). The sawmill is CSA certified with a capacity of 350,000 cubic metres (150 million board feet). The sawmill was built by Avenor Inc. and later sold to Weyerhaeuser, then to Domtar, and is now owned by Eacom Timber Corporation. The sawmill was operational from 1998 to 2009. There were intermittent closures in 2008, and was closed indefinitely in 2009 due to unfavourable market conditions. Eacom has announced a plan to reopen the sawmill with an anticipated start date in mid- to late- 2014.

In 2013, EACOM and the local union, Unifor, signed an 8-year agreement from 2014 to 2022. The sawmill commenced operation in August 2014. Unifor estimates as many as 125 of its members will have work at the sawmill site and up to 175 more will be employed in log harvesting and hauling operation.

=== Tourism (1945–present) ===
The construction of Highway 105 helped to introduce tourism to the area, with hunting and fishing camps constructed on lakeshore sites along the highway. It also provided access points to Lac Seul, Cedar River and Chukuni River. Ear Falls is a natural funnel for supplies and services, due to its location between Vermillion Bay and Red Lake and its waterway access points.

A tourist camp was built around the former Hudson's Bay store at Goldpines. Camps were also operated at Little Canada and Snake Falls. Once the Ontario Hydro construction at Manitou Falls was completed and the lumber company had closed, the tourist industry became the economic mainstay of the Ear Falls community. Hunting and fishing have been a popular draw to the area for years, and more recently, eco-tourism has added an additional element to the tourism experience of Ear Falls.

In 2019, the Township of Ear Falls, in coordination with Accommodation Facilities in the Tourism Sector, reviewed the option of implementing a Municipal Accommodation Tax in the municipality. Council has determined that the Municipal Accommodation Tax, as revenue tool, does not appear to be in the best interest of the community at large due to the relatively low level of revenue that would be generated and the increased costs to administer another form of taxation. Council determined that a Municipal Accommodation Tax will not be implemented for Ear Falls.

== Demographics ==
In the 2021 Census of Population conducted by Statistics Canada, Ear Falls had a population of 924 living in 402 of its 506 total private dwellings, a change of −7.1% from its 2016 population of 995. With a land area of 336.69 km^{2} (130.00 sq mi), it had a population density of 2.7/km^{2} (7.1/sq mi) in 2021.

Canada census – Ear Falls community profile

	2021	2016	2011
Population	924 (-7.1% from 2016)	995 (-3.0% from 2011)	1,026 (-11.0% from 2006)
Land area	336.69 km^{2} (130.00 sq mi)	330.96 km^{2} (127.78 sq mi)	331.03 km^{2} (127.81 sq mi)
Population density	2.7/km^{2} (7.0/sq mi)	3.0/km^{2} (7.8/sq mi)	3.1/km^{2} (8.0/sq mi)
Median age	43.6 (M: 44.4, F: 42.4)	41.0 (M: 42.8, F: 39.5)
Private dwellings	506 (total) 402 (occupied)	490 (total)	505 (total)
Median household income	$93,000	$86,592

References: 2021 2016 2011

Historical census populations – Ear Falls

Year	Pop.	±%
1971	1,479	—
1976	1,982	+34.0%
1981	2,028	+2.3%
1986	1,695	−16.4%
1991	1,294	−23.7%
1996	1,170	−9.6%

Year	Pop.	±%
2001	1,150	−1.7%
2006	1,153	+0.3%
2011	1,026	−11.0%
2016	995	−3.0%
2021	924	−7.1%

Source: Statistics Canada

== Climate ==
The climate is a hemiboreal climate (Dfb) closely bordered to the north by a subarctic climate (Dfc).

Climate data for Ear Falls
Month	Jan	Feb	Mar	Apr	May	Jun	Jul	Aug	Sep	Oct	Nov	Dec	Year
Record high °C (°F)	5.5 (41.9)	11.1 (52.0)	17.8 (64.0)	32.2 (90.0)	34 (93)	38 (100)	40 (104)	34.4 (93.9)	35 (95)	26.7 (80.1)	17.8 (64.0)	7.8 (46.0)	40 (104)
Mean daily maximum °C (°F)	−13.5 (7.7)	−8.7 (16.3)	−0.9 (30.4)	8.5 (47.3)	17.1 (62.8)	21.6 (70.9)	24.2 (75.6)	22.7 (72.9)	15.6 (60.1)	8 (46)	−2.5 (27.5)	−11.1 (12.0)	6.6 (43.9)
Daily mean °C (°F)	−18.4 (−1.1)	−14.3 (6.3)	−6.7 (19.9)	2.4 (36.3)	10.6 (51.1)	15.6 (60.1)	18.4 (65.1)	17.1 (62.8)	10.9 (51.6)	4.1 (39.4)	−6 (21)	−15.3 (4.5)	1.5 (34.7)
Mean daily minimum °C (°F)	−23.3 (−9.9)	−19.8 (−3.6)	−12.4 (9.7)	−3.7 (25.3)	3.9 (39.0)	9.7 (49.5)	12.5 (54.5)	11.5 (52.7)	6.1 (43.0)	0.2 (32.4)	−9.5 (14.9)	−19.5 (−3.1)	−3.7 (25.3)
Record low °C (°F)	−43.3 (−45.9)	−46 (−51)	−36.1 (−33.0)	−28.9 (−20.0)	−13.3 (8.1)	−1.7 (28.9)	−0.6 (30.9)	0 (32)	−8.3 (17.1)	−17.8 (0.0)	−37 (−35)	−41.7 (−43.1)	−46 (−51)
Average precipitation mm (inches)	31.4 (1.24)	22.5 (0.89)	31 (1.2)	32.6 (1.28)	57.5 (2.26)	95.7 (3.77)	96.3 (3.79)	100.9 (3.97)	85 (3.3)	49.5 (1.95)	38.9 (1.53)	35.8 (1.41)	677.1 (26.66)
Source: Environment Canada

== Services ==
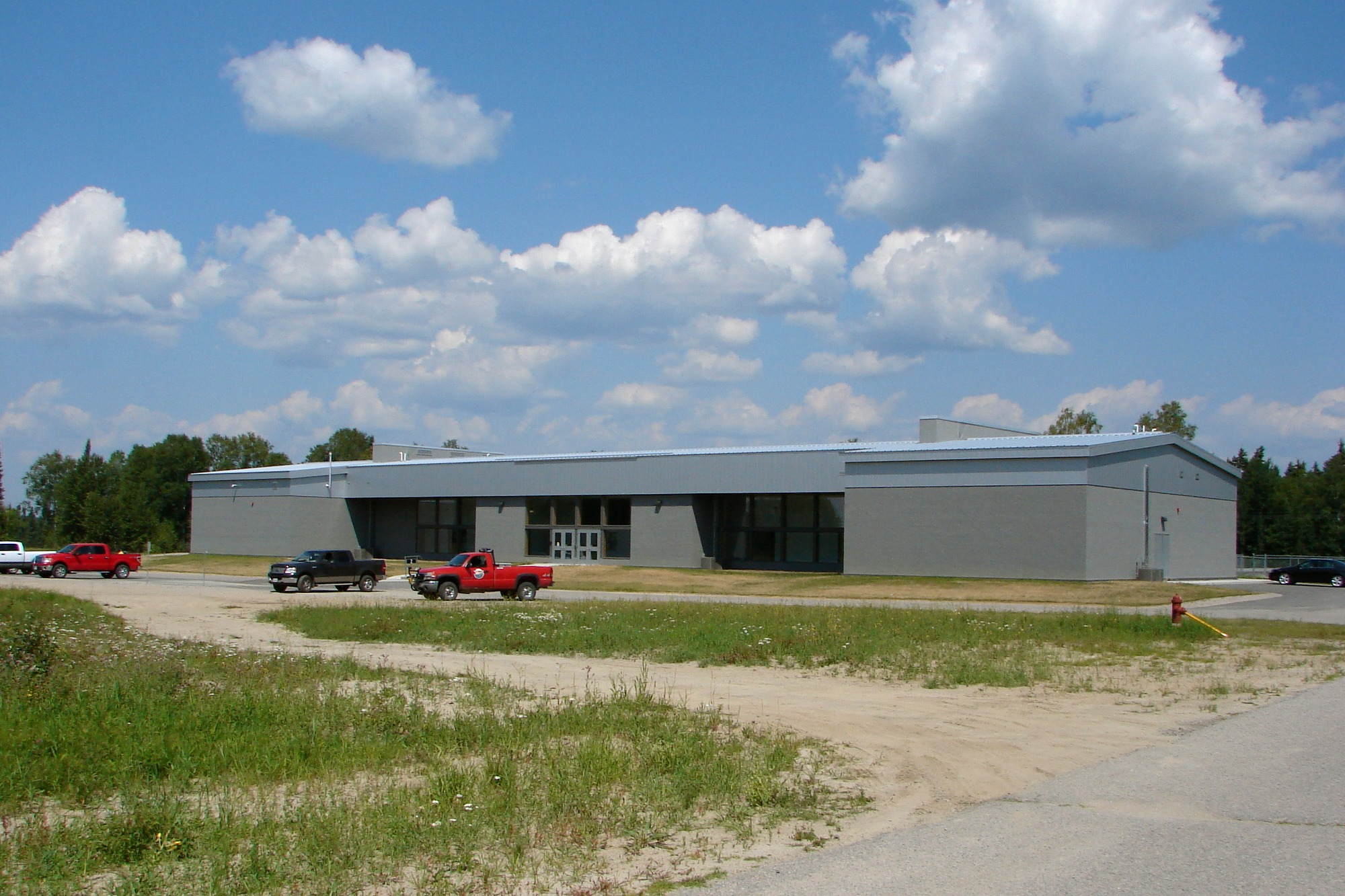
Municipal building

Ear Falls offers essential services and shopping for residents and tourists. The municipal water and sewage treatment plants are able to support a population of five times the current population.

Other facilities include a Community Health Centre (built in 2010) and a Municipal Government Building (constructed in 2011) which contains the Municipal Office, Fire Hall, Day Care, Public Library, Best Start Hub (Parent Resource Centre) and a Museum as well as public meeting rooms.

== Education ==
Ear Falls has an elementary school and day care service. Older children go to secondary school in Red Lake at the Red Lake District High School. Adult Education services and Distance Education services are also available in the community.

== Activities ==
Ear Falls tourism is centered on outdoor recreation. It has numerous fishing and hunting camps located throughout the area, catering to both novice and seasoned fishermen alike. Each year during the hunting season, the town draws hundreds of hunters from all over the world.

In the summer months, mountain biking, ATVs, hiking and geocaching are some of the ways to see the wildlife and experience the outdoors. In the winter months, activities include snowmobiling, snow-shoeing, ice fishing and cross-country skiing are common. The community utilizes a few different Facebook Groups to advertise local events (search Township of Ear Falls (@earfalls), Ear Falls Central, and Ear Falls Best Start Hub (@earfallsbeststarthub)

Every year, the community hosts the annual Trout Forest Music Festival.

== See also ==
- List of townships in Ontario
