= Pearce Estate Park =

City park located in Calgary, Alberta, Canada

Pearce Estate Wetland
- Interactive map of Pearce Estate Wetland
- Type: Urban park
- Location: 1440 17A St. S.E. Calgary
- Nearest city: Calgary, Alberta
- Coordinates: 51°02′30″N 114°00′53″W
- Area: 21 hectares (52 acres; 0.21 km^{2})
- Operator: City of Calgary

Pearce Estate Park is a city park located in Calgary, Alberta. The park occupies 21 hectares (52 acres; 0.21 km^{2}) along the Bow River to the east of downtown Calgary. The park contains Pearce Estate Wetland, described as "constructed wetlands filled with native plants and animals". The land was donated to the city around 1929 by then prominent Calgarian William Pearce.

The park is located west of the Wilder Institute/Calgary Zoo and the neighborhood of Inglewood, at the western end of International Avenue, inside a bend of the Bow River. An interpretative trail was opened to the public in 2004.

== Location ==
The main parking lot for the park is located at 1440 17A St. S.E. Calgary, to the east of the neighborhood of Inglewood. It is east of the Wilder Institute/Calgary Zoo, at the western end of International Avenue, inside a bend of the Bow River.

== Background ==
The park is named after William Pearce (1848–1930), who served as the Inspector of Dominion Lands Agencies where he oversaw the "development and allocation of all land, forests, mineral and water resources" from "Winnipeg to the eastern foothills of the Rockies"—representing 400,000 square miles of land. With such influence, he earned the nickname the "Czar of the West". On October 21, 1880, the Canadian Pacific Railway (CPR) signed an agreement with the federal government to build a 1,900 mile-railway from Kamloops, British Columbia to Callander, Ontario. The railway was to receive "$25 million and 25 million acres of land 'fairly fit for settlement.'" Pearce convinced the CPR to build the line through Calgary, with the Bow River watershed used to irrigate lands in southern Alberta. John Palliser who led the 1857-1859 British Palliser expedition to Western Canada, and for whom the Palliser's Triangle was named, had said the land was "unfit for settlement." By 1915, Pearce's vision of a vast irrigation system had been realized; land that Palliser thought would never support settlement, was "fertile and valuable". A 1915 article in Scientific American described it as "America’s Greatest Irrigation Project." According to E.J. (Ted) Hart, director of the Whyte Museum in Banff, who is the author of "several histories" of the Bow River watershed region, the "irrigation history of the Bow is one of the great industrial projects of Canada’s history. It created an economy out of an area that was considered useless."

Pearce moved to Calgary, Alberta in 1884 and worked for twenty years for the CPR. A year before he died he donated his estate in the southeast of Calgary, which occupied about 80 hectares (200 acres; 0.80 km^{2}) in a curve along the Bow River as it flows through the city.

Pearce's land, on which the Pearce Estate Park is situated, was "devoted to experimental methods." Before Pearce owned the wetlands, they were once part of a "riverine forest complex". Pearce used some of the land for agriculture. Pearce "believed in urban parks" and he "is the reason so much of the Bow remains accessible" to the public as it runs through the city core.

In 2004, the city opened the newly developed wetland area and interpretive trail to the public.

== Features ==
Pearce Estate Park includes naturalized, reconstructed wetlands with ponds and streams along its pathways. It has a playground, picnic sites, seasonal washrooms, cross-country skiing, walking and biking trails, and access to the kayak rapids. Trails include the "Walking on Water Trail," the BP "Discovery Trail," and the Ducks Unlimited "Webbed Foot Lane". The Sam Livingston Fish Hatchery, which is operated by the province, and provincially operated Bow Habitat Station are on the site. The nature interpretation facility is "jointly developed and operated" by the province of Alberta, the City of Calgary, along with private and non-profit sectors. The park occupies 21 hectares (52 acres; 0.21 km^{2}) hectare which includes 15 hectares (37 acres; 0.15 km^{2}) of wetland area and the adjacent Bow Habitat Station.

== Flora ==
The Estate ecosystem is a Balsam Poplar riverine forest, where willows, including the silver willow, Water Birch and Red-osier Dogwood thrive. Balsam Poplar Populus balsamifera, which are also known as call Black Cottonwoods, prefer a very moist soil and can tolerate flooding. The bark of the balsam poplar is thick and gnarly and their leaves are large and pointed leaves. These trees provide habitat for a diversity of native fauna. In the small streams and ponds, submergent vegetation, like Sago Pondweed can be found. Common Duckweed floats on surface waters.

== Wildlife ==
The white-breasted nuthatch and gray catbird are very common. Birds that nest in cavities, such as common goldeneye, tree swallows, and northern flickers, are attracted to the older balsam poplar trees. Some of these trees can live up to 200 years. Pond birds include american coots. Invertebrates include the water boatman, midges, and diving beetles that the ducks feed on.

== Bend in the Bow ==
Pearce Estate Park is part of the proposed Bend in the Bow project which seeks to connects Pearce Estate Park and the adjoining green spaces on the banks of the Bow River to the Inglewood Wildlands and Inglewood Bird Sanctuary (IBS).

== Harvie Passage ==
Pearce Estate Park provides access to the Harvie Passage, which was officially reopened for recreational use in 2018. The passage is a high water channel, for skilled kayakers and a "low water channel for novice paddlers." It was closed to recreational following the 2013 flood, and reopened in 2018.

Harvie Passage, formerly the Calgary Weir, is part of a network of canals and ponds originally created by the CPR in the early 20th century to divert water from the Bow River. This water was diverted from the Bow River as part of the Western Irrigation District (WID), which first opened in 1914. This was one of two irrigation districts in southern Alberta that supplied water from the Bow River, the other being the Eastern Irrigation District (EID). The Bow River has been an "engineered and managed river" since the early 20th century. (Note: The Calgary-based Alberta WaterPortal released a series entitled The Story of Water Management on the Bow River consisting of ten videos about the past, present and future of water management on the Bow.) The CPR construction of the diversion weir at the bend in the Bow River in Calgary was the first stage in what would become a network of irrigation canals and reservoirs. According to a 2011 series by the Alberta Water Portal, WID receives much of Calgary's storm water and has more rainfall than the EID, and supports the needs of the City and those of the southern Alberta agriculture sector.
