= Kawigamog =

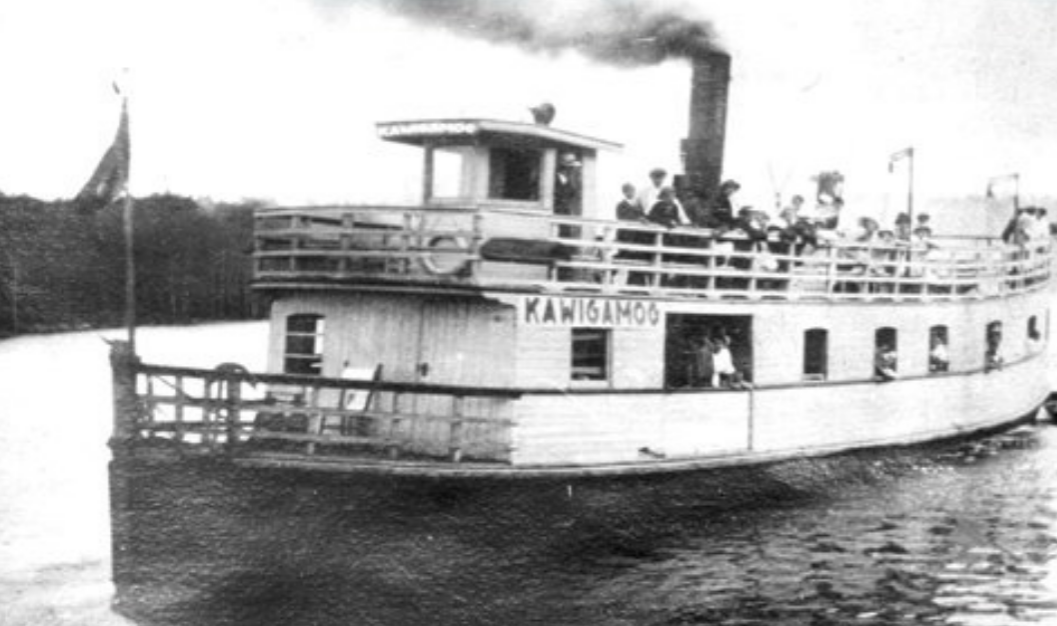
- Steamship Kawigamog in northern Ontario

History
- Builder: Arthur Walton, Loving, Ontario
- Yard number: 134459
- Completed: 1913
- Fate: scuttled 1928 Wauquimakog Lake in Port Loring

General characteristics
- Type: Steamship
- Displacement: 54 tons
- Length: 72 feet (22 m)
- Installed power: Engine 7-14x10 by Midland Engine Works
- Propulsion: screw
- Speed: 10 knots
- Notes: bow was plated with .75 inches (1.9 cm) steel plates

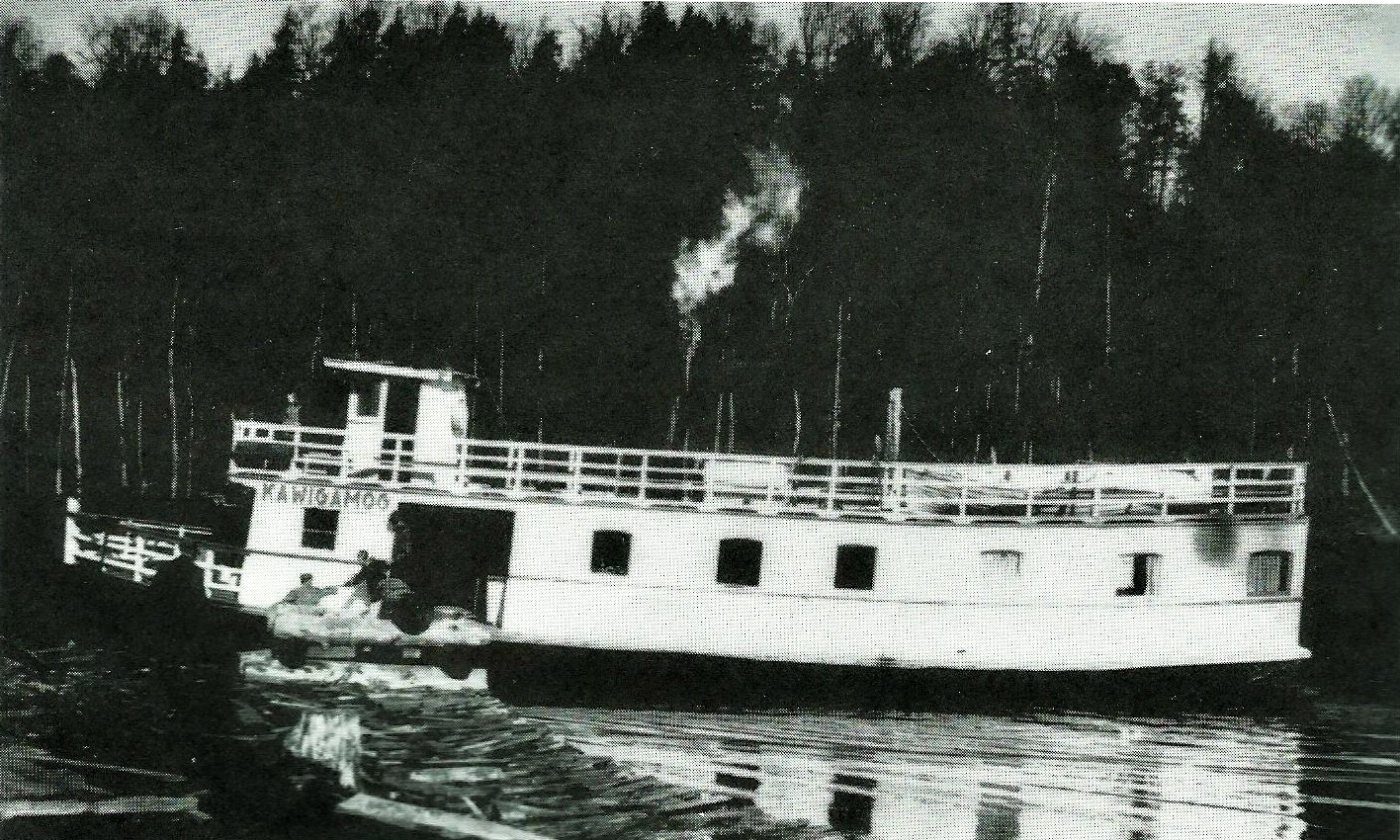

The Kawigamog was a steamship that carried passengers and all kinds of cargo on the Pickerel River, a tributary of the French River, that drains Lake Nipissing into Georgian Bay, in Ontario.

She was built in 1913 by a family of boat builders, headed by Arthur Walton, who had built several steamships for service on the Magnetawan River. As development of the Magnetawan basin brought roads it reduced the need for steamboats, so they relocated north, to the Pickerel. She was the first steamship on the Pickerel, and could only navigate a small portion until the outlet of Wilson Lake (or Wauquimakog Lake) was deepened.

She was 72 feet (22 m) long, and displaced 54 tons. Unlike most other similar vessels she was built with a relatively low bow, so she could beach her bow to load or unload passengers and cargo where there were no docks.

Her bow was plated with .75 inches (1.9 cm) steel plates, allowing her to travel through ice-encrusted water, making her the first vessel to be used in the spring.

She was worn out by 1928, and was scuttled.
