= William Pearce (civil engineer) =

Canadian land surveyor and civil engineer

- Born: February 1, 1848; Canada West
- Died: 1930 (aged 81–82); Calgary, Alberta
- Citizenship: Canadian
- Spouse: Margaret A. Meyer (1853–1943) m. 1881
- Children: Adolphine Elizabeth Frances; Adolphine Thornton (Tassie); Seabury Kains; William Ernest; Harry John Leslie; John Eric
- Parent(s): John Pearce and Elizabeth Moorhouse

William Pearce (1848–1930), was a surveyor, statistician, planner, and administrator in western Canada. He served in the federal government from 1874 to 1904 as federal surveyor and administrator, as federal advisor for western development and as Western consultant for the Canadian Pacific Railway Company. As Inspector of Dominion Lands Agencies, he oversaw the "development and allocation of all land, forests, mineral and water resources" from "Winnipeg to the eastern foothills of the Rockies"—representing 400,000 square miles of land, earning his nickname—"Czar of the West". He was known for his work on the Bow River watershed irrigation systems that transformed lands in southern Alberta into fertile land.

Pearce moved to Calgary, Alberta in 1884 and after retiring from public service, worked for the CPR as statistician. A year before he died he donated his 80 hectares (200 acres) estate to the City of Calgary. The Pearce Estate Wetland is an urban park. Pearce "believed in urban parks" and he "is the reason so much of the Bow remains accessible" to the public as it runs through the city core.

== Early years ==
William Pearce was born near Port Talbot, Dunwich Township, Elgin County, Ontario on February 1, 1848. (Note: The Glenbow Museum William Pearce family fonds archives includes documents related to the funding and "construction of the Calgary General Hospital (1890-1903); his articles on the Riel Rebellion, National Parks, irrigation, CPR, and oil."report to the Economic and Development Commission on development of the West (1916); a genealogy of the Pearce family; architectural plans for the Pearce home (1888); survey plan of proposed irrigation ditch (1896).") His parents, John Pearce and Elizabeth Moorhouse, were United Empire Loyalists.

== Education ==
He studied engineering for one semester at the University of Toronto. In 1869, he began a three-year surveying apprenticeship with the Toronto-based Wadsworth and Unwing, working in the woods of northern Ontario. This experienced "inspired his life-long interest in natural resource and wilderness development." In October 1872 he was certified as a Province of Ontario Land Surveyor.

== Professional life ==
Early career

In 1873, with Wadsworth and Unwin, he worked on the "challenging Thousand Island survey project running surveys across open water and ice on the shores of the St. Lawrence River."

=== Federal surveyor and administrator (1874–1884) ===
In 1873, Canada's first Surveyor General, Colonel John Stoughton Dennis, hired Pearce for the newly created Dominion Department of the Interior, established to "absorb the vast North American regions of Rupert's Land and the North-West Territories." The Rupert's Land Act 1868 resulted in the transfer of Rupert's Land from the control of the Hudson's Bay Company to the Dominion of Canada—representing the largest land purchase in Canada's history, which was consummated in 1870. In 1873, the federal government created the Department of the Interior—a "single department administrative jurisdiction" over all First Nations and Metis land, and all public lands west of Ontario. Pearce's professional career as federal surveyor in these years following the land acquisition, was inextricably linked to the "strategies to assert Canadian sovereignty and control over this vast region", strategies that "were foundation stones of federal policy." He worked for the Canadian Department of the Interior for thirty years, from 1874 to 1904.

Northwest Territories (1874-1881)

As Inspector of Agencies on the Dominion Lands Board, he "was in charge of investigating all land claims (mostly Metis) from the Red River to the Rockies." His first posting was in Winnipeg in May 1874. He worked in a climate of "shifting settlements, squatting, and rampant land speculation" involving the Metis, newly arrived settlers, and land speculators. Under the 1870 Manitoba Act, Metis settlers had "outer two miles" access," which referred to access to hay two miles beyond their defined holdings to feed their livestock."

As Inspector, he oversaw the "development and allocation of all land, forests, mineral and water resources" from "Winnipeg to the eastern foothills of the Rockies"—representing 400,000 square miles of land. With such influence, he earned the nickname the "Czar of the West".

On October 21, 1880, the Canadian Pacific Railway (CPR) signed an agreement with the federal government to build a 1,900 mile-railway from Kamloops, British Columbia, to Callander, Ontario. The railway was to receive "$25 million and 25 million acres of land 'fairly fit for settlement.'"

By 1884, just before he stepped down from his position as Inspector of Agencies on the Dominion Lands Board, "land claims protest had reached such a level that he was charged to address all outstanding land claims disputes across the Prairies south of the North Saskatchewan River."

During the 1887 federal election, Sir Wilfrid Laurier's Liberal Party told the House of Commons that federal surveyors had "mishandled western settlement" and blamed the "poor administration of Metis land claims" for the 1885 North-West Rebellion by the Métis people under Louis Riel against the government of Canada. In response to a request by Thomas White, the Minister of the Interior, Pearce submitted a detailed report in 1886 defending the work of the surveyors.

=== Federal advisor for western development policy (1884–1904) ===
In 1883, Prime Minister John A. Macdonald appointed Pearce to chair a special Lands Board Investigation Commission to resolve the growing discontent in Prairie settlements.

In 1884, Surveyor General Lindsay Russell promoted Pearce to the position of Superintendent of Mines in Calgary, Alberta, reported directly to the Deputy Minister. In both these administrative positions, Pearce influenced federal "policies for development of land, mineral, water, and timber resources in the North-West Territories."

From 1884 until his death in 1930, Pearce and his family lived in Calgary.

In a November 25, 1885 Order-in-Council, Pearce and his some of his colleagues at the Department of the Interior preserved a "series of parkland reserves, including Banff" forming the "basis for Canada's National Parks system".

"From 1898 to 1901 he was involved with the adjustment of railway land grants." He "participated in the ruling on the Canadian Pacific Railway's land grant and worked for several years on developing stock water reserves in the southern Prairies." Pearce convinced the CPR to build the line through Calgary, with the Bow River watershed used to irrigate lands in southern Alberta. John Palliser who led the 1857-1859 British Palliser expedition to Western Canada, and for whom the Palliser's Triangle was named, had said the land was "unfit for settlement."

Chief Inspector of Surveys

From 1901 to 1904, he was Chief Inspector of Surveys.

From 1890 to 1904, Pearce focused on water management and irrigation on the prairies, playing a significant role in "initiating and shaping the Northwest Irrigation Act of 1894." He experimented with irrigation system projects. He and Dennis represented Canada at "two international Irrigation Congresses."

=== Western consultant for the Canadian Pacific Railway Company (1904–1928) ===
He left public service and began to work the Canadian Pacific Railway (CPR) as a statistician in 1904, becoming the "major proponent of the company's irrigation schemes in Alberta and Saskatchewan." He worked for the CPR until he died.

Pearce began lobbying for the formation of an Albertan provincial surveyors association in 1905. When the 1910 Alberta Land Surveyors' Act was passed, he was elected in 1911 as the Alberta Land Surveyor Association's first president.

During World War I, Pearce was asked to work in Ottawa as an national adviser on western resources.

He was praised by Prime Minister Robert Borden for the 800-page report he submitted to the 1916 Royal Commission on Economics and Development.

== Father of Irrigation in Alberta ==
"The existing climatic conditions, and the necessity for irrigation, has been frequently referred to in the reports of Dominion Land Surveyors employed in surveying this arid region into townships and sections, but it is probably due to the lengthy reports upon this subject, and to the persistent advocacy of the principle by Mr. Wm. Pearce, Superintendent of Mines, more than to any other cause, that the public have at last recognized the necessity for irrigation and the benefits to be secured therefrom."

— John Stoughton Dennis. Report to the Government on Irrigation and Canadian Irrigation Surveys. 1894.

John Stoughton Dennis, Chief Inspector of Surveys visited the United States to study irrigation laws and practices and reported his findings to the Canadian parliament, in which he recommended the passage of the Northwest Irrigation Act and cited the advocacy work of William Pearce. The Act was passed on July 23, 1894, providing the "legal basis for all subsequent irrigation legislation and development in Canada." A their 1925 report of an early history of irrigation in southern Alberta, said that Dennis' praise of Pearce's lobbying for irrigation happened "more than thirty years ago, and Mr. Pearce is still preaching the same gospel. Truly this record entitles him to the distinction of being called the "Father of Irrigation in Alberta".

== Published works ==
William Pearce authored these publications:

*Detailed report upon all claims to land and right to participate in the North-West half-breed grant by settlers along the South Saskatchewan and vicinity west of range 26, W. 2nd meridian: Being the settlements commonly known as St. Louis de Langevin, St. Laurent or Batoche, and Duck Lake. Ottawa: Printed by MacLean, Roger & Co., 1886

*The absurdity and injustice of single tax as carried out in the western provinces of Canada: Respectfully submitted to students of the subject of taxation. Calgary: Herald Western Printing Co., 1915

*The proposed northwest Saskatchewan irrigation project and some reminiscences of irrigation in western Canada. Calgary: Western Canada Irrigation Association, 1919

*Memorandum and sketch illustrating the possibility of diverting water from the N. Saskatchewan River for stock purposes on a large tract of land: Bounded on the north by the North Saskatchewan River & Battle River, on the east by the South Saskatchewan & Red Deer Rivers situated in the provinces of Alberta & Saskatchewan 1919

== Personal life ==
"William married Margaret A. Meyer, 1853-1943, in 1881.

"They had six children, Adolphine Elizabeth Frances, 1883-1975, Adolphine Thornton (Tassie), 1885-1970, Seabury Kains, 1887-1959, William Ernest, 1890-?, Harry John Leslie, 1894-1976, and John Eric, 1890-?. The family settled permanently in Calgary in 1887.

Both "William and his wife were instrumental in the establishment of the Calgary General Hospital in 1890."

He retired from the CPR in 1926.

== Frank Pearce Estate ==
In 1889, Pearce built the family mansion—Bow Bend Shack—which was located at 2014 - 17th Ave S.E. The mansion was demolished in 1957.

== Honours ==
Pearce was designated as a Person of National Historic Significance in 1973 by the Historic Sites and Monuments Board of Canada.
