= North Bay Parry Sound District Health Unit =

Canadian health clinic

Coordinates: 46.3132°N 79.4676°W

- Interactive map of the North Bay Parry Sound District Health Unit area

General information
- Type: Health Unit
- Architectural style: Contemporary Architecture
- Location: 345 Oak St. West, North Bay, Ontario, North Bay, Canada
- Completed: 2017

Technical details
- Floor area: 58,803 sq. ft

Design and construction
- Architect: Mitchell Jensen Architects
- Structural engineer: RJC Engineers
- Awards and prizes: 2018 Best of Canada Award, Canadian Interiors Magazine 2018 Northern Ontario Excellence Award, Woodworks! Wood Design Awards

Website
- https://www.myhealthunit.ca/en/index.asp

The North Bay Parry Sound District Health Unit is a public health clinic located in North Bay, Ontario. The 150-person, 58,000 ft^{2} (5,400 m^{2}) facility comprises multiple health care offices, clinical and community spaces.

== Building awards ==
The building was designed by Mitchell Jensen Architects. The building has received two major awards for its design and construction.

- 2018 Best of Canada Award, Canadian Interiors Magazine (in collaboration with Carlyle Design Associates)
- 2018 Northern Ontario Excellence Award, Wood WORKS! Wood Design Awards

== Common area ==
The common area or lobby of the building gives access to a clinic, family room, classroom and other nearby quarters, private and public areas. This area exhibits many different functions circulation wise but holds great architectural components. Common area of the building exhibits an exposed roof structure paneled in a wood veneer. These wood veneer panels are a glue laminated Douglas fir cladding. This cladding extends from the exterior of the building to the interior to draw from its natural surrounding. A two-story limestone cladded wall also brings this idea of an interior and exterior connection. A large window assembly situated on the south end of the common area brings guests a view of Lake Nipissing.
