= John B. Fraser =

Lost steamship

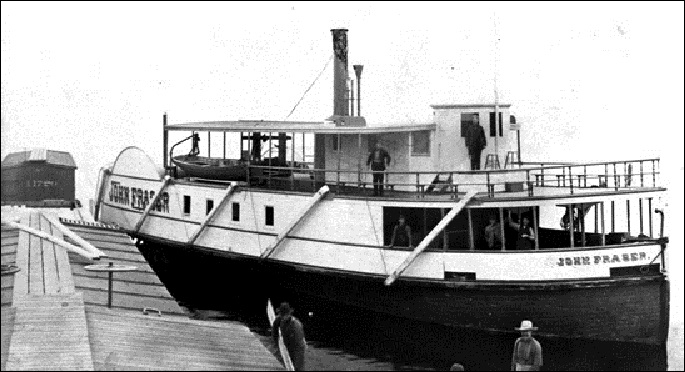

John B. Fraser was a steamship lost on Lake Nipissing with considerable loss of life. Seven men survived. Thirteen corpses were found. Four men were never accounted for.

She was 102 feet (31 m) long, was propelled by a pair of paddlewheels, and carried passengers on two decks. She was staffed by a crew of six.

She was launched in 1888, one of approximately 20 steamships working the lake. She was lost on November 7, 1893.

The North Bay Scuba Club found the ship's wreck, in the summer of 1972, after a month's search. The wreck was found between the Goose and Manitou Islands, in 15 metres (49 ft) of water. Artifacts recovered triggered the creation of a local nautical museum.
