= French River Provincial Park Visitor Centre =

Coordinates: 46.0173°N 80.5856°W

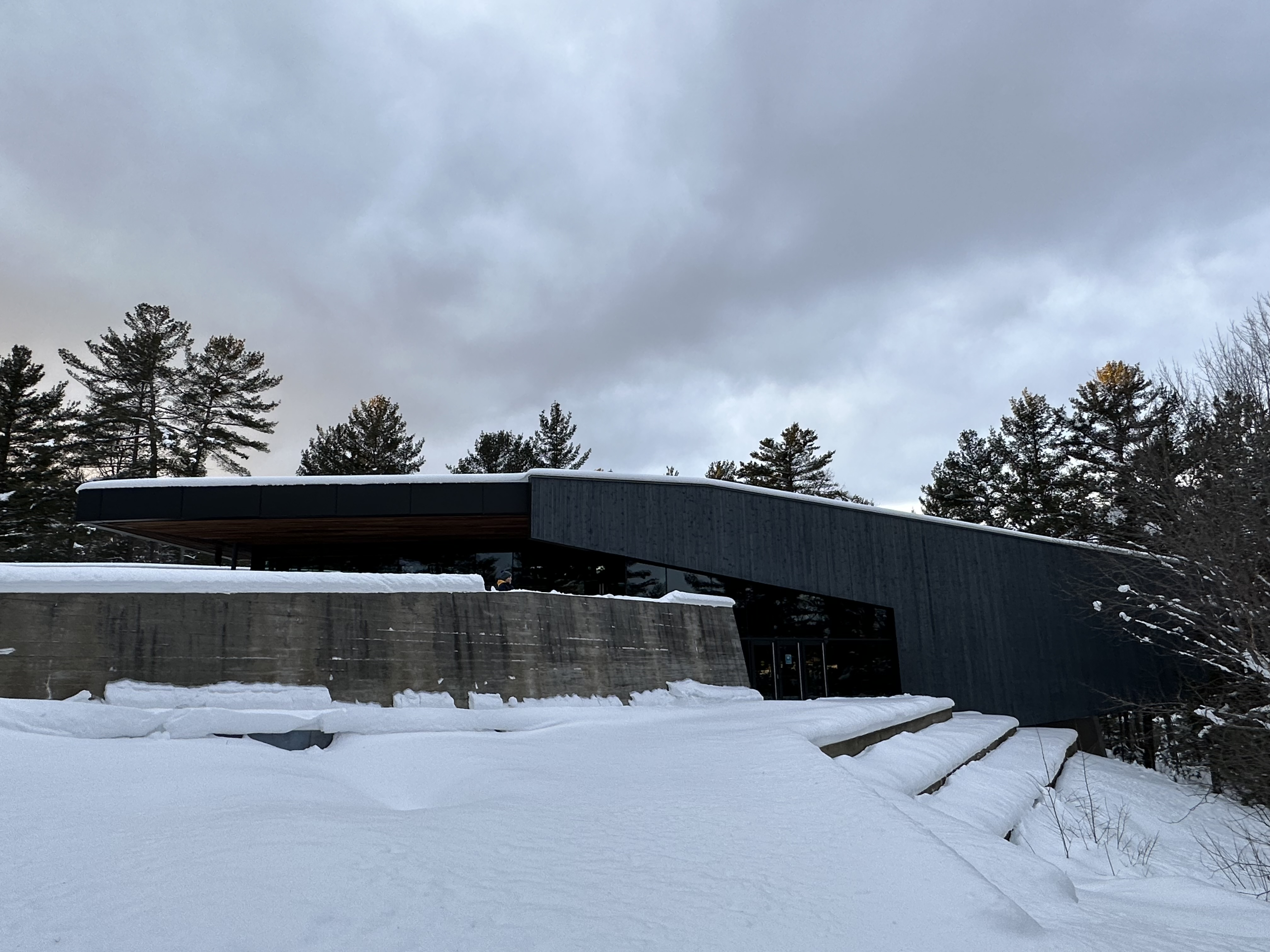
- Exterior perspective of the visitor centre
- Interactive map of the French River Provincial Park Visitor Centre area

General information
- Type: Provincial park visitor centre
- Location: French River, Ontario, 20526 Settlers Rd, Alban, ON P0M 1A0, Canada
- Inaugurated: June, 2006
- Client: Government of Ontario, Ministry of Natural Resources

Technical details
- Floor area: 791 m² [8,514 s.f.]

Design and construction
- Architecture firm: Baird Sampson Neurt
- Structural engineer: Blackwell Bowick Partnership Ltd.

The French River Provincial Park Visitor Centre is an information, education, and events centre along the French River in Ontario, Canada. The building opened in 2006 and was designed by Baird Sampson Neuert Architects in collaboration with the Government of Ontario, Ministry of Natural Resources. The building serves as an educational and recreational hub for tourists and the surrounding communities.

Both the visitor centre and the park are located on the traditional lands of the Henvey Inlet First Nation and Dokis First Nation. The visitor centre is located west of Ontario Highway 69, 93 km (58 mi) north of Parry Sound, Ontario, and is close to the small town of Alban.

The visitor centre is located within the ecological protection of the UNESCO Georgian Bay Mnidoo Gamii Biosphere. The site is underlain by bedrock composed Grenvillian granite and gneiss and covered by the temperate forest of the Great Lakes-St. Lawrence Forest Region.

== Architecture ==
The French River is one of Canada's Heritage Waterways, acting as a passageway for ice, water, and people over the vast rock landscape. The river was influential to the design, as the building form is an architectural expression of the river, connecting its physical qualities and cultural history through an integrated approach to the landscape. The visitor centre experience is organized along an inclined topography of natural and constructed elements. The building is set back from the river along its southern bank, anchored to an exposed bedrock outcrop, and cantilevers north over the river valley. A thin stand of trees separates the building from the river, which protects the building from northerly winds and prevents the building from imposing on the landscape. The building is elongated in a north-south direction, with most of its glazing facing east and south, oriented for capturing sunlight in the morning and early afternoon.

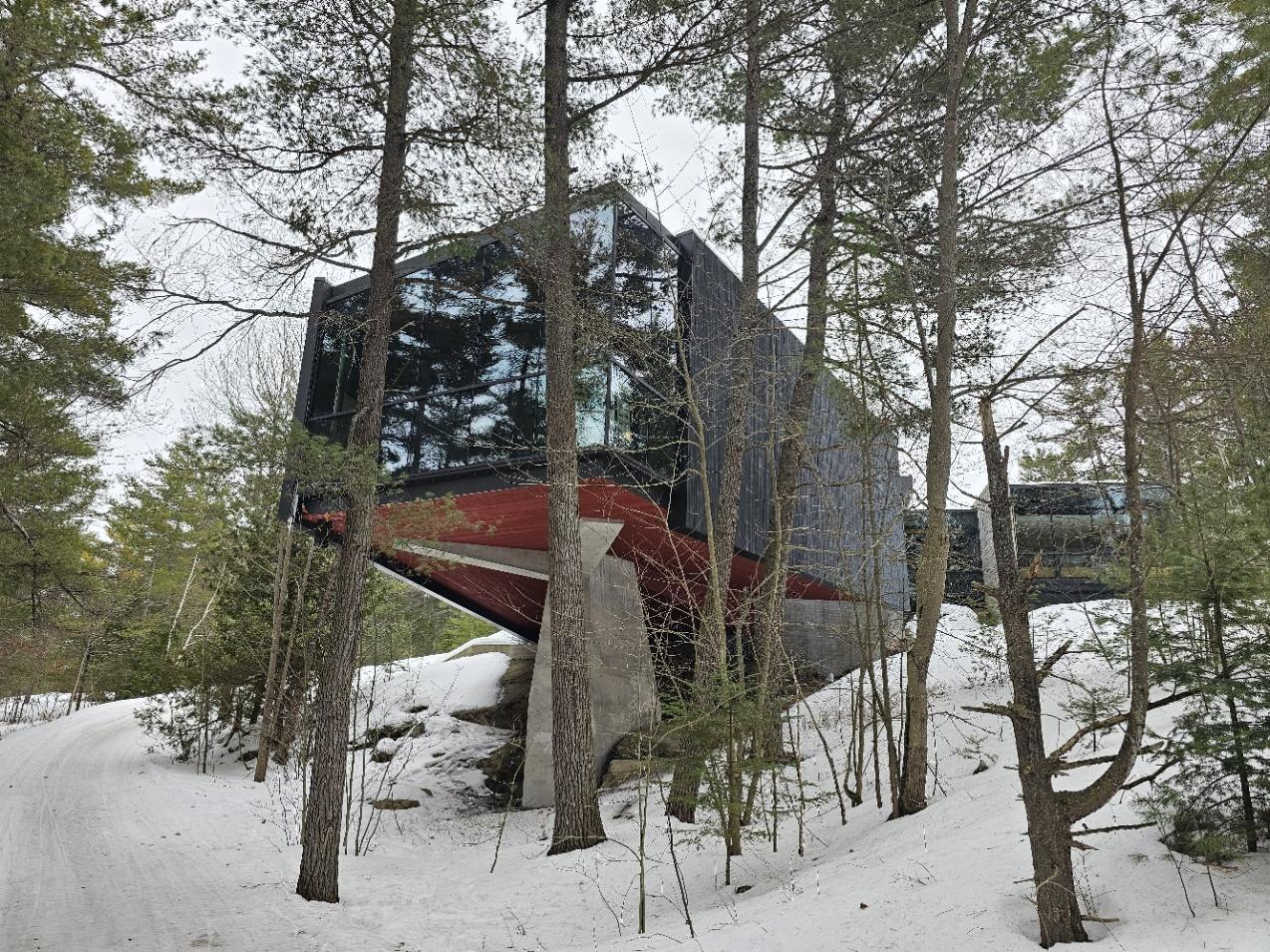
French River Visitor Centre Museum Cantilever

The building is supported by a foundation of steel-reinforced poured concrete. Similarly poured concrete walls extend up to the roof and project out from the building. Glue-laminated beams carry the roof loads into the foundation through glue-laminated posts where the envelope is opaque or through steel columns where the envelope is glazed. The exterior of the building is composed of a combination of opaque walls with vertical cedar boards, painted grey, and transparent walls that are fully glazed from the foundation to the eaves. The eaves are cladded with naturally-coloured cedar boards that continue into the interior of the building. Poured concrete walls comprise part of the primary structure of the building and also continue outside the building as exterior walls that are imprinted with a wood grain texture. These concrete walls are concentrated in the western part of the building and are positioned to protect the building and visitors from westerly winds.

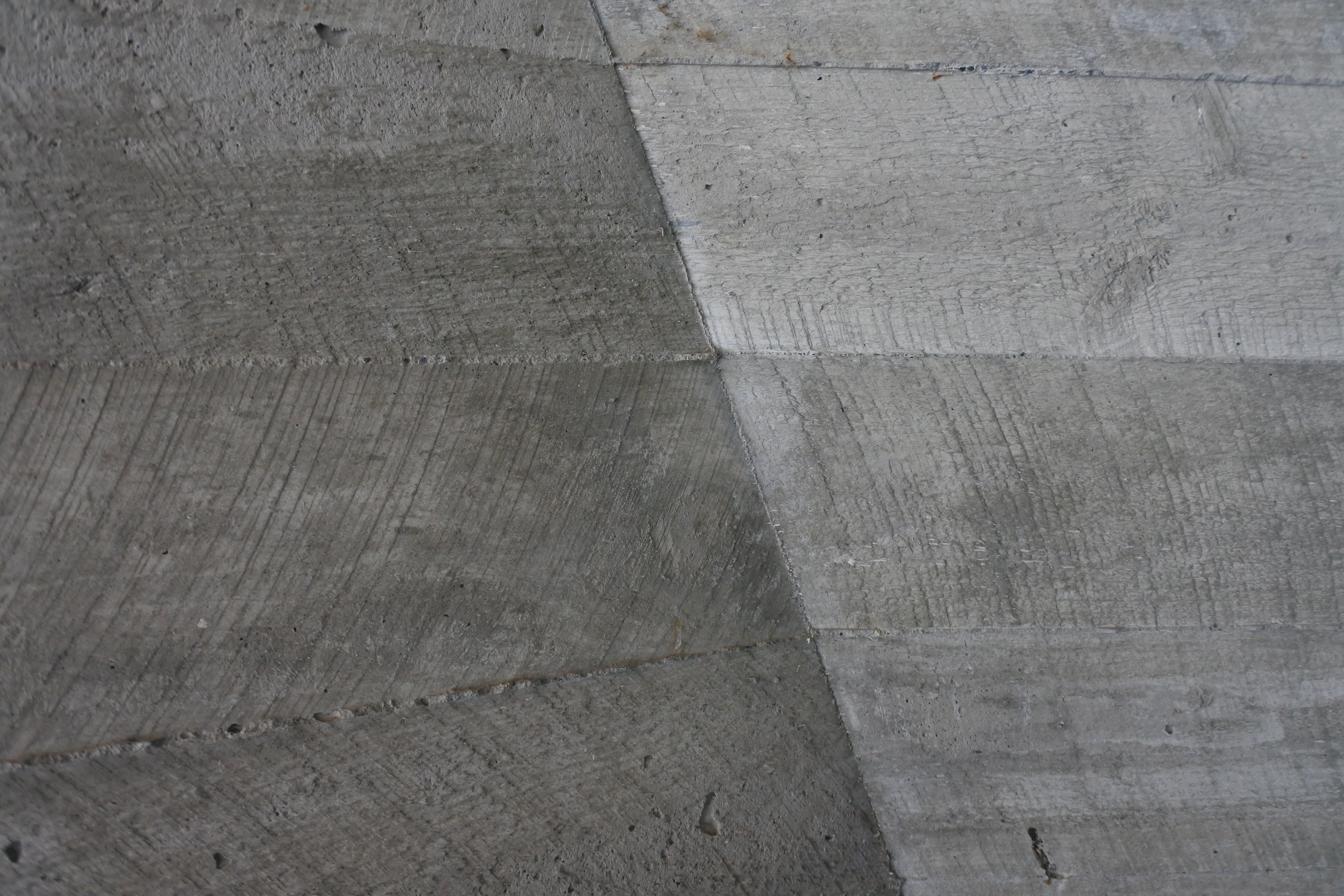
Concrete Texture

The building and site were designed with energy conservation and water stewardship in mind. The centre utilises passive solar heating, thermal mass, and thermal insulation to effectively reduce heating and cooling demands. These passive methods are complemented by an active heat recovery ventilation system. As a result, the building exceeds the Model National Energy Code of Canada threshold by 40 percent. Rainwater is managed to reduce surface runoff and erosion, and both surface and sewerage waters are passed through bio-filter systems before being reintroduced to the local groundwater supply. The utilisation of a series of "islands" in the parking lot showcases the location of the building's water infrastructure. The use of an Eco flow sanitary system includes natural materials, such as sphagnum moss helping create a sustainable system.

The design team consisted of eleven individuals: Jon Neuert, Barry Sampson, Geoffrey Thün, Gregory Reuter, Mauro Carreño, Jennifer Anderson, Seth Atkins, Jose Uribe, Nene Stout, Mark Martin, Dieter Janssen.

== Programming ==
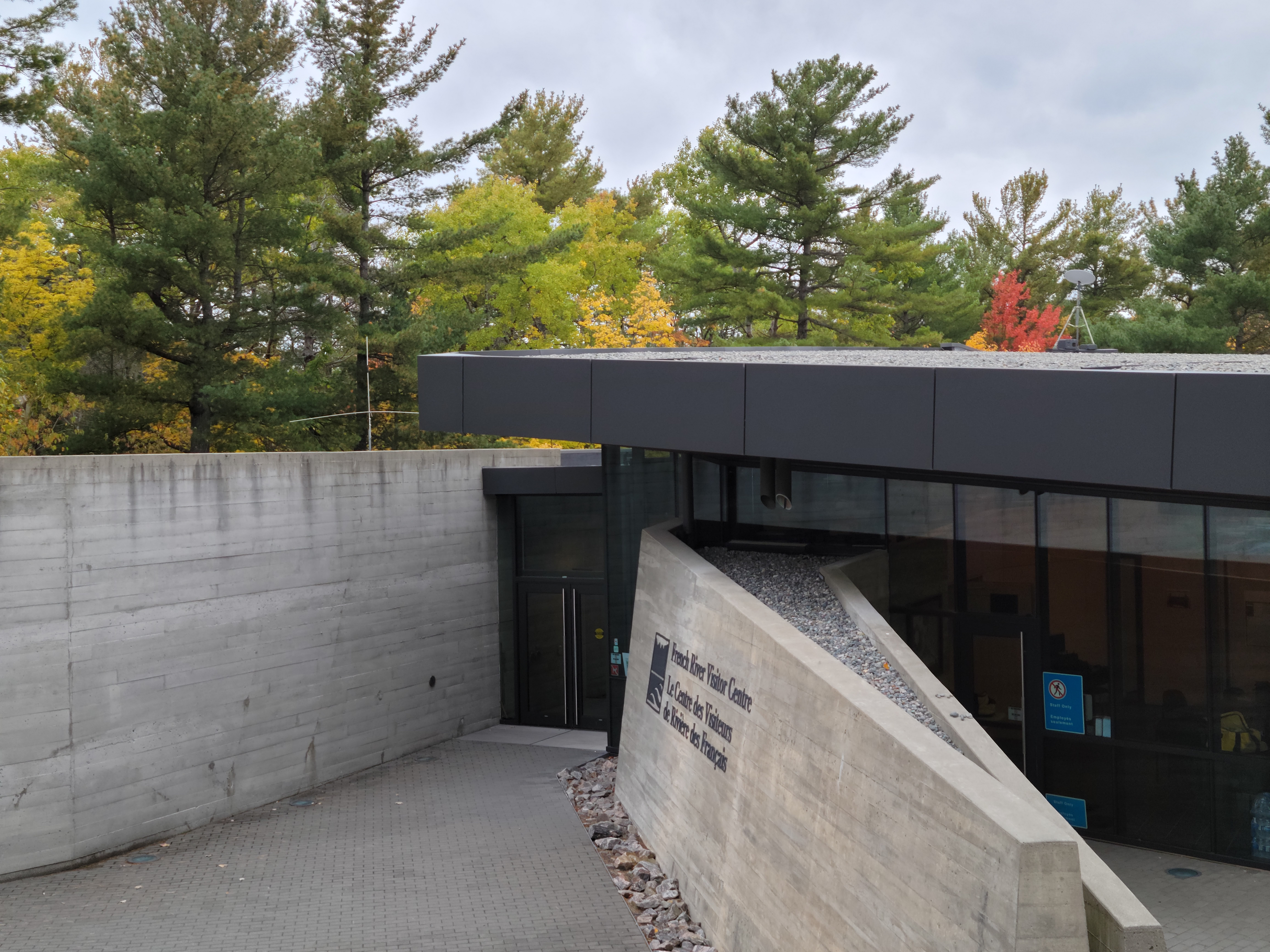
French River Visitor Centre, main entrance

The 790 m^{2} (8,500 sq ft), single-storey building is arranged in two parts with distinct programming. To the west, visitors will find offices, washrooms, a gift store, and local tourism information. The eastern section contains a multi-use event space and the "Voices of the River" exhibit. This exhibition serves as an educational tool, teaching visitors about the ecology of the French River area and its historical significance as both Indigenous and colonial travel and trade waterway.

External events and teaching terraces are arranged along the east part of the building, complementary to the adjacent interior education, and multi-use event spaces.

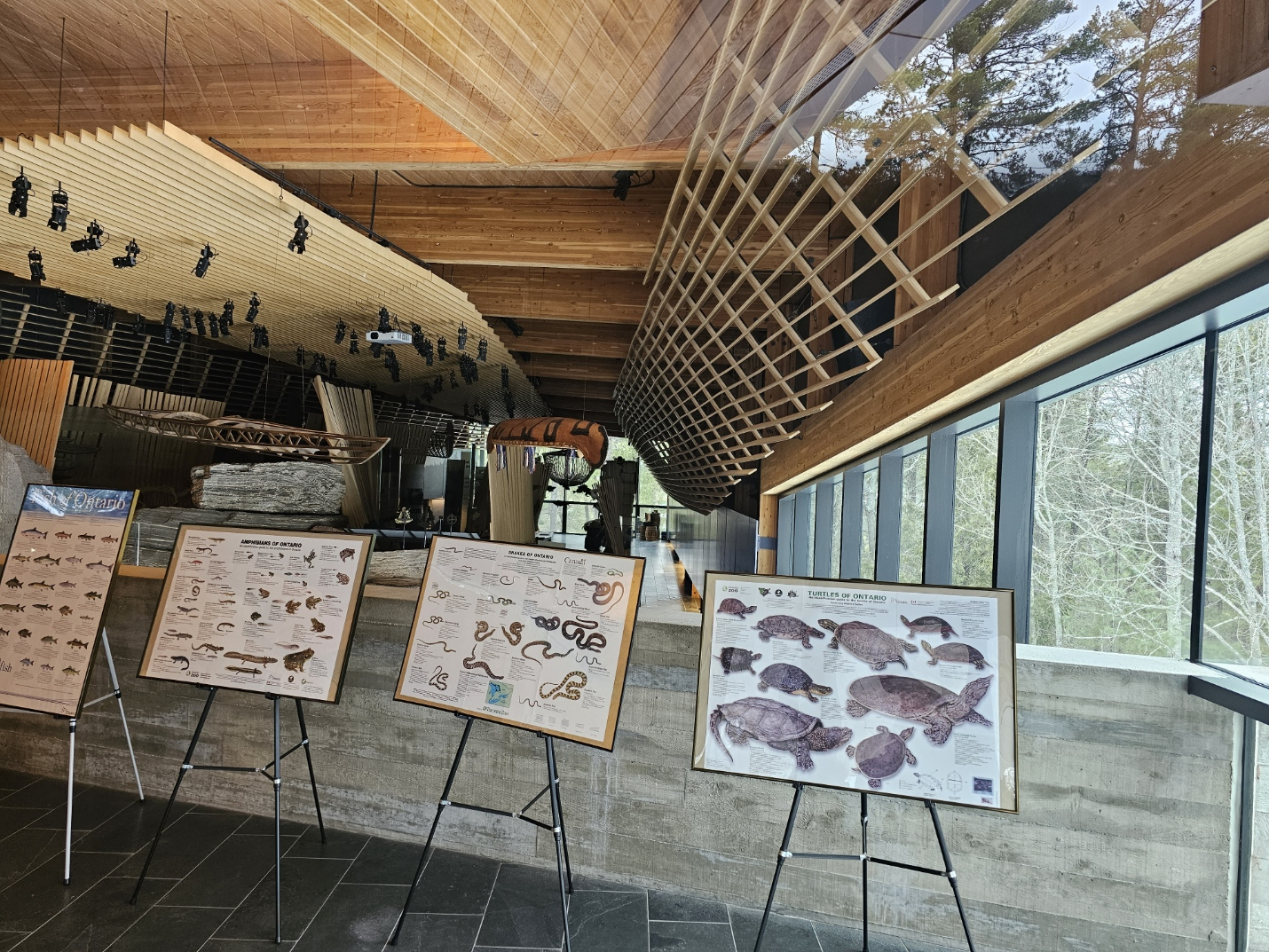
Interior Programming

A cluster of buildings known as the "Pow Wow Grounds" are located west of the centre's parking lot, including an octagonal gazebo, a lean-to-style pavilion, and outhouses. This area is available for use by the nearby Dokis and Henvey Inlet First Nations for community gatherings. Several recreational trails lead visitors through and around the site, including:

- Hiking trails to Recollet Falls, west of the visitors centre
- Hiking and snowmobile trail crossing the French River via the William E. Small Bridge, as part of the Ontario Federation of Snowmobiling Clubs' province-wide network of snowmobile trails.

Nearby on the east side of Highway 69, approximately 700 m (2,300 ft) upstream, the French River Supply Post and Marina serves as a public boat launch and a canoe-tripping outfitter. Watercraft travelling downstream will pass the visitor centre on their way toward Georgian Bay.

== Construction ==
The visitor centre's construction focused on minimising the environmental impact on the site, which involved studies of the land before construction began. The contractor for the construction was completed by Kona Builders Limited.

The construction cost of this project was $3.5 million for the building and an additional $1 million for inside exhibits.

== Awards ==
- RAIC Governor General's Medal 2010
- Canadian Museums Association Award for Outstanding Achievement - Facility Development and Design 2008
- OAA Design Excellence Award 2007
- OAA Best in Show 2007
- Outside the Box Award – Design Excellence 2007
- Woodworks Award 2006
- Design Exchange Silver Award – Architectural Commercial 2006
- Canadian Architect Award of Excellence 2005
- Ontario Concrete Award of Merit 2005
