= Callander Bay =

Bay in Parry Sound District, Ontario, Canada

- baie Callander
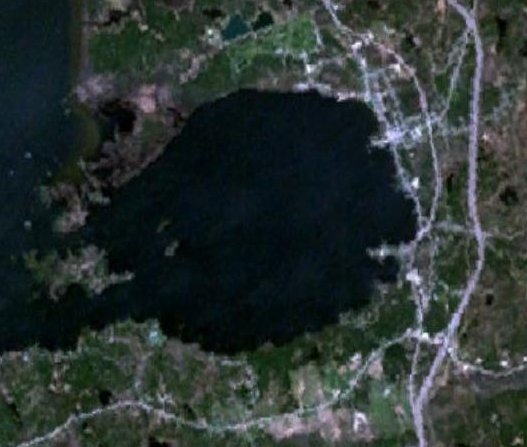
- Satellite image of Callander Bay

- Location in southern Ontario Location in Ontario
- Location: Parry Sound District, Ontario
- Coordinates: 46°12′46″N 79°23′20″W
- Part of: Lake Nipissing
- Basin countries: Canada
- Surface elevation: 196 m (643 ft)
- Settlements: Callander

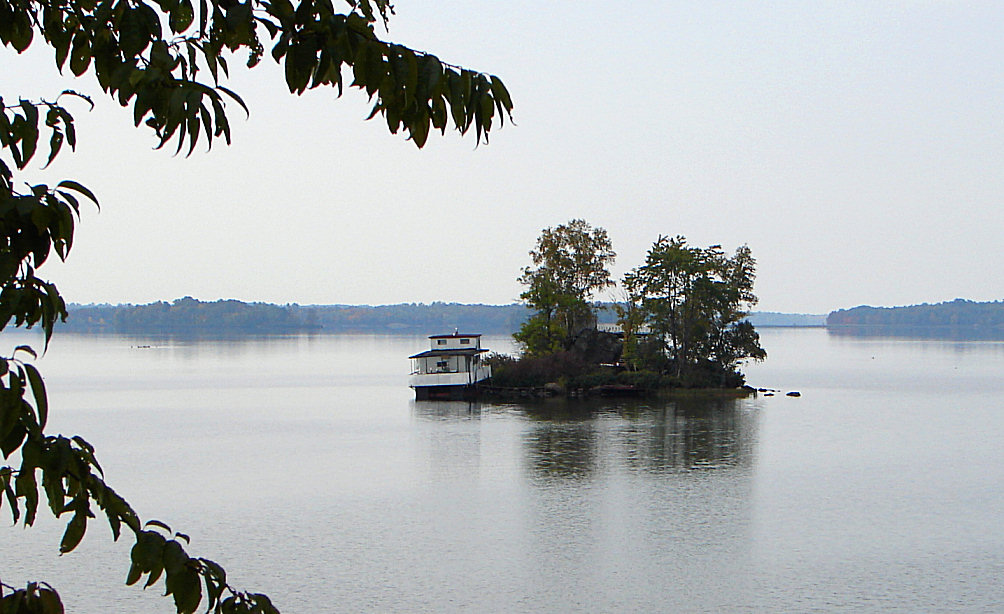
Callander Bay

Callander Bay (French: baie Callander) is a bay at the extreme east of Lake Nipissing in the municipality of Callander, Parry Sound District, Ontario, Canada. It is approximately four kilometres (2.5 mi) in diameter. The community of Callander is located on its east side.

== Geology ==
Callander Bay is an eroded Proterozoic volcanic pipe formed by the violent, supersonic eruption of a deep-origin volcano. These volcanoes originate at least three times as deep as most other volcanoes, and the resulting magma that is pushed toward the surface is high in magnesium and volatile compounds such as water and carbon dioxide. As the body of magma rises toward the surface, the volatile compounds transform to gaseous phase as pressure is reduced with decreasing depth. This sudden expansion propels the magma upward at rapid speeds, resulting in a shallow supersonic eruption.

Callander Bay contains uncommon rocks such as nepheline syenite and carbonatite and the minerals: aegirine, amphibole, analcime, apatite, barite, biotite, calcite, cancrinite, chalcopyrite, chlorite, diopside, dolomite, fluorite, garnet, hematite, kaersutite, magnetite, muscovite, nepheline, olivine, perthite, pyrite, pyroxene and pyrrhotite.

== See also ==
- List of volcanoes in Canada
- Manitou Islands
- Volcanology of Canada
- Volcanology of Eastern Canada
