= Sanfilippodytes terminalis =

Scientific classification
- Kingdom: Animalia
- Phylum: Arthropoda
- Class: Insecta
- Order: Coleoptera
- Suborder: Adephaga
- Family: Dytiscidae
- Genus: Sanfilippodytes
- Species: S. terminalis

Binomial name
- Sanfilippodytes terminalis (Sharp, 1882)

Synonyms
- Hydroporus browni Wallis, 1933; Hydroporus terminalis Sharp, 1882

Species of beetle

Sanfilippodytes terminalis is a species of predaceous diving beetle in the family Dytiscidae. It is found in North America.
