= Murdock River =

River in Canada

Murdock River French: Rivière Murdock
- Location of the mouth of the river in Ontario

Location
- Country: Canada
- Province: Ontario
- Region: Northeastern Ontario
- District: Sudbury District

Physical characteristics
- Source: Mud Lake, Ontario
  - location: Servos Township
  - coordinates: 46°15′47″N 80°44′08″W
  - elevation: 215 m (705 ft)
- Mouth: French River (river)
  - location: French River (municipality)
  - coordinates: 46°04′10″N 80°36′42″W
  - elevation: 182 m (597 ft)

Basin features
- River system: Lake Huron drainage basin

The Murdock River (French: Rivière Murdock) is a river in Sudbury District in Northeastern Ontario, Canada. It is in the Lake Huron drainage basin and is a right tributary of the French River.

== Course ==
The river begins at Mud Lake in geographic Servos Township in Unorganized North Sudbury District. It flows west through Graham Lake, turns south, and is crossed by the Canadian Pacific Railway main line. It enters Lovering Lake at the community of Paget, flows west under Ontario Highway 69 into Kakakiwaganda Lake, then turns sharply east back under Highway 69 to Round Lake. It heads south southeast, passes briefly through the northeast corner of geographic Cox Township, enters the municipality of French River, is crossed by Ontario Highway 64 and Ontario Highway 607, and reaches its mouth at the French River near the central community of French River.

== See also ==
- List of rivers of Ontario

== Sources ==
- Map 8 (PDF) (Map). 1 : 700,000. Official road map of Ontario. Ministry of Transportation of Ontario. 2010-01-01.
- Restructured municipalities - Ontario map #4 (Map). Restructuring Maps of Ontario. Ontario Ministry of Municipal Affairs and Housing. 2006.
