= Sanfilippodytes latebrosus =

Scientific classification
- Domain: Eukaryota
- Kingdom: Animalia
- Phylum: Arthropoda
- Class: Insecta
- Order: Coleoptera
- Suborder: Adephaga
- Family: Dytiscidae
- Genus: Sanfilippodytes
- Species: S. latebrosus

Binomial name
- Sanfilippodytes latebrosus (LeConte, 1852)

Synonyms
- Hydroporus latebrosus LeConte, 1852

Species of beetle

Sanfilippodytes latebrosus is a species of predaceous diving beetle in the family Dytiscidae. It is found in North America.
