= Sanfilippodytes compertus =

Scientific classification
- Domain: Eukaryota
- Kingdom: Animalia
- Phylum: Arthropoda
- Class: Insecta
- Order: Coleoptera
- Suborder: Adephaga
- Family: Dytiscidae
- Subfamily: Hydroporinae
- Tribe: Hydroporini
- Genus: Sanfilippodytes
- Species: S. compertus

Binomial name
- Sanfilippodytes compertus (Brown, 1932)

Species of beetle

Sanfilippodytes compertus is a species of predaceous diving beetles in the family Dytiscidae. It is found in North America.
