= Sanfilippodytes edwardsi =

Scientific classification
- Domain: Eukaryota
- Kingdom: Animalia
- Phylum: Arthropoda
- Class: Insecta
- Order: Coleoptera
- Suborder: Adephaga
- Family: Dytiscidae
- Genus: Sanfilippodytes
- Species: S. edwardsi

Binomial name
- Sanfilippodytes edwardsi (Wallis, 1933)

Synonyms
- Hydroporus edwardsii Wallis, 1933

Species of beetle

Sanfilippodytes edwardsi is a species of predaceous diving beetle in the family Dytiscidae. It's found in North America.
