= Sanfilippodytes brumalis =

Scientific classification
- Domain: Eukaryota
- Kingdom: Animalia
- Phylum: Arthropoda
- Class: Insecta
- Order: Coleoptera
- Suborder: Adephaga
- Family: Dytiscidae
- Genus: Sanfilippodytes
- Species: S. brumalis

Binomial name
- Sanfilippodytes brumalis (Brown, 1930)

Species of beetle

Sanfilippodytes brumalis is a species of predaceous diving beetle in the family Dytiscidae. It is found in North America.
