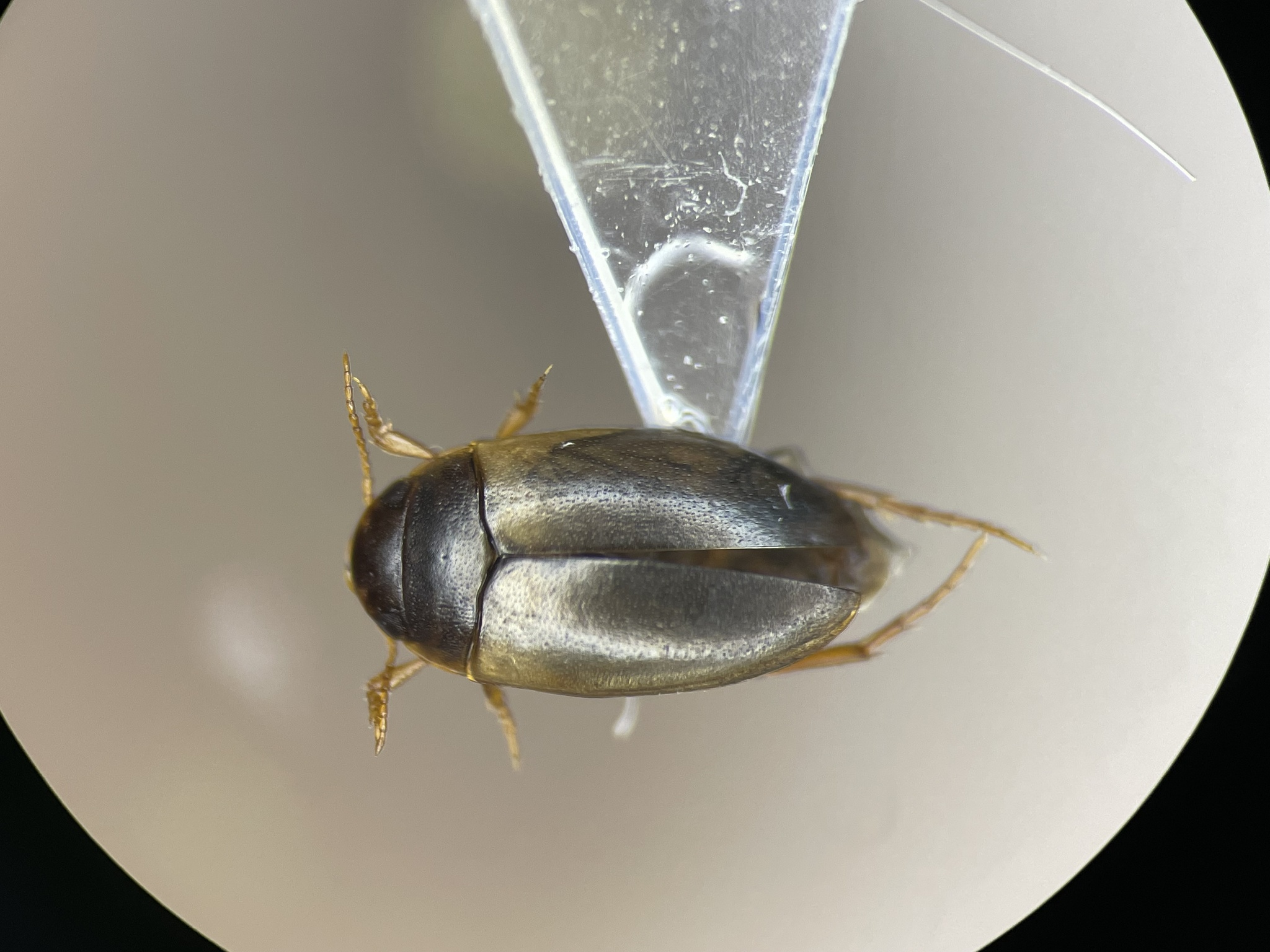
- Sanfilippodytes pseudovilis, Canada

Scientific classification
- Domain: Eukaryota
- Kingdom: Animalia
- Phylum: Arthropoda
- Class: Insecta
- Order: Coleoptera
- Suborder: Adephaga
- Family: Dytiscidae
- Genus: Sanfilippodytes
- Species: S. pseudovilis

Binomial name
- Sanfilippodytes pseudovilis (Young, 1953)

Synonyms
- Hydroporus pseudovilis Young, 1953

= Sanfilippodytes pseudovilis =

Species of beetle

Sanfilippodytes pseudovilis is a species of predaceous diving beetle in the family Dytiscidae. It is found in North America.
