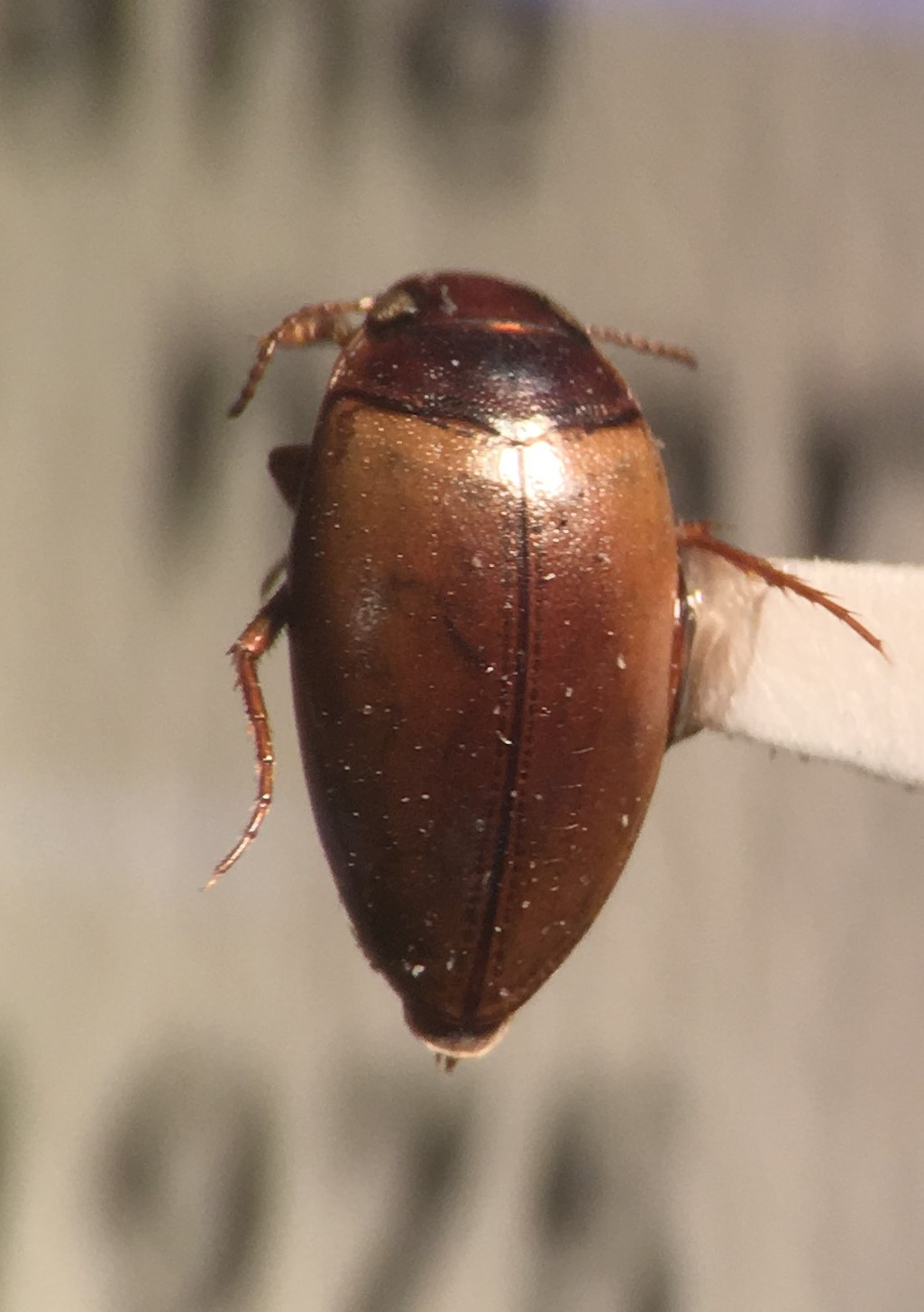
- Sanfilippodytes rossi

Scientific classification
- Domain: Eukaryota
- Kingdom: Animalia
- Phylum: Arthropoda
- Class: Insecta
- Order: Coleoptera
- Suborder: Adephaga
- Family: Dytiscidae
- Subfamily: Hydroporinae
- Tribe: Hydroporini
- Genus: Sanfilippodytes; Franciscolo, 1979

= Sanfilippodytes =

Genus of beetles

Sanfilippodytes is a genus of beetles in the family Dytiscidae, containing the following species:

- Sanfilippodytes adelardi (Rochette, 1983)
- Sanfilippodytes barbarae (Fall, 1932)
- Sanfilippodytes barbarensis (Wallis, 1933)
- Sanfilippodytes belfragei (Sharp, 1882)
- Sanfilippodytes bertae Roughley & Larson, 2000
- Sanfilippodytes bidessoides (Leech, 1941)
- Sanfilippodytes brumalis (Brown, 1930)
- Sanfilippodytes compertus (Brown, 1932)
- Sanfilippodytes corvallis (Fall, 1923)
- Sanfilippodytes edwardsi (Wallis, 1933)
- Sanfilippodytes hardyi (Sharp, 1882)
- Sanfilippodytes kingii (Clark, 1862)
- Sanfilippodytes latebrosus (LeConte, 1852)
- Sanfilippodytes malkini (Hatch, 1951)
- Sanfilippodytes pacificus (Fall, 1923)
- Sanfilippodytes palliatus (Horn, 1883)
- Sanfilippodytes planiusculus (Fall, 1923)
- Sanfilippodytes pseudovilis (Young, 1953)
- Sanfilippodytes rossi (Leech, 1941)
- Sanfilippodytes sbordonii Franciscolo, 1979
- Sanfilippodytes setifer Roughley & Larson, 2000
- Sanfilippodytes terminalis (Sharp, 1882)
- Sanfilippodytes veronicae (Rochette, 1983)
- Sanfilippodytes vilis (LeConte, 1852)
- Sanfilippodytes williami (Rochette, 1986)
