= French River (Ontario) =

River in Ontario, Canada

French River Rivière des Français, Emitigoozhii-ziibi
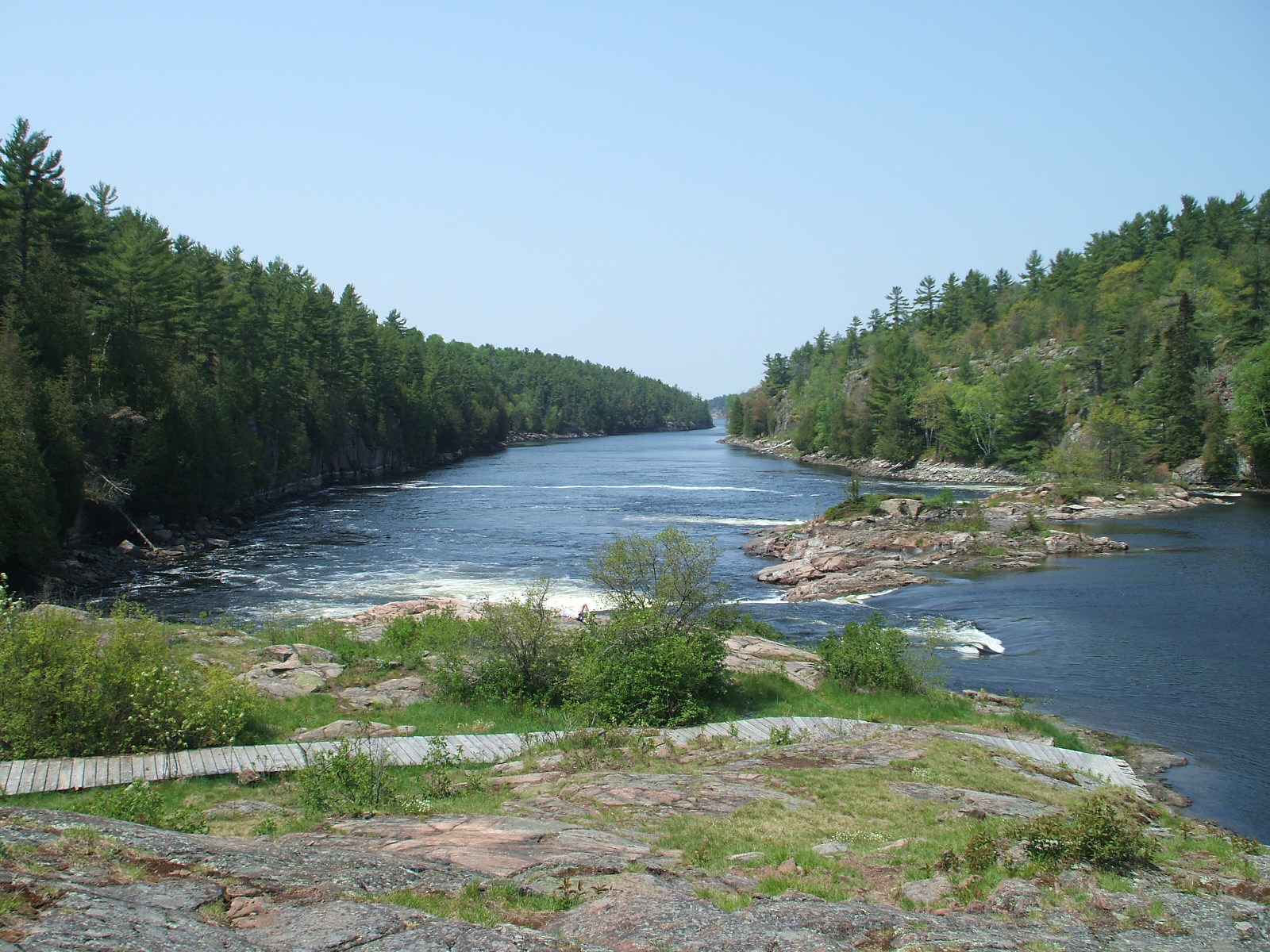
- Recollet Falls of the French River near Hwy. 69

Location
- Country: Canada
- Province: Ontario
- Districts: Nipissing; Parry Sound; Sudbury

Physical characteristics
- Source: Lake Nipissing
  - location: Nipissing District
  - coordinates: 46°12′30″N 79°49′30″W
- Mouth: Georgian Bay
  - location: Parry Sound District
  - coordinates: 45°56′26″N 80°54′06″W (for main outlet)
- Length: 110 km (68 mi)
- Basin size: 19,100 km^{2} (7,400 sq mi)

The French River (French: Rivière des Français, Ojibwe: Emitigoozhii-ziibi) is a river in Central Ontario, Canada. It flows 110 kilometres (68 mi) from Lake Nipissing southwest to Georgian Bay. The river largely follows the boundary between the Parry Sound District and the Sudbury District, and in most contexts is considered the dividing line between Northern and Southern Ontario. The French River was designated a Canadian Heritage River in 1986.

== Geography ==
The French River flows through typical Canadian Shield country, in many places exposing rugged glaciated rock but also through heavily forested areas on the upper portion. The mouth of the river contains countless islands and numerous channels which vary from narrow, enclosed steep-walled gorges, falls and rapids, to broad expanses of open water.

Tributaries of this river include the:

- Wanapitei River
- Pillow River
- Murdock River
- Wolseley River
- Little French River
- Pickerel River
- Restoule River
- Hall River

== History ==
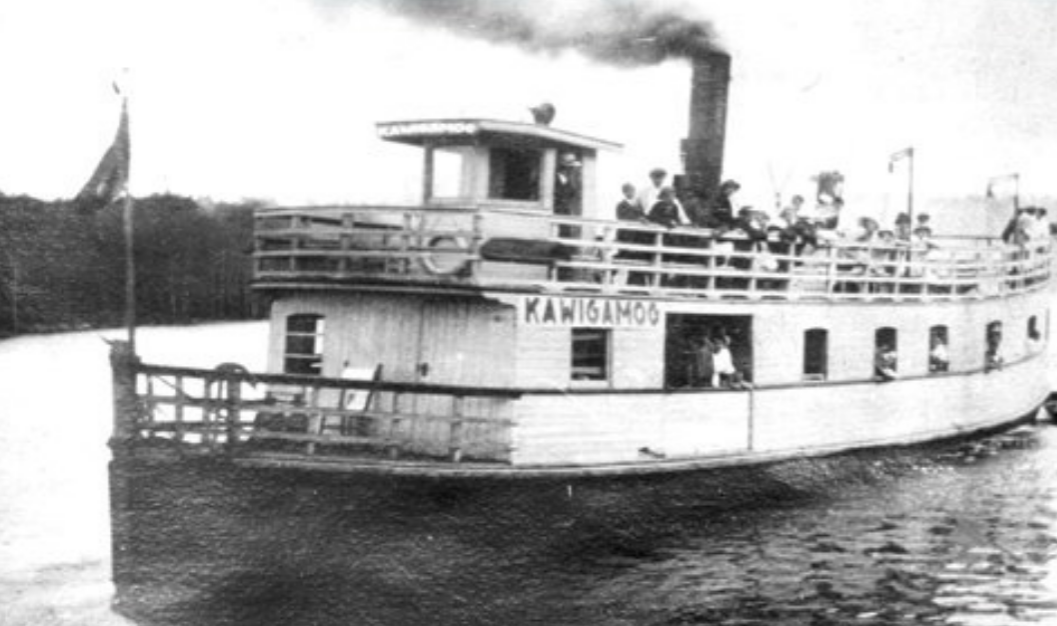
The steamship Kawigamog carried cargo and passengers on the Pickerel River, a tributary of the French River system from 1913 to 1928.

It was used as a transportation corridor by the Algonquian peoples of this region. The Ojibwa named it Emitigoozhii-ziibi. It became known to Europeans as the "French River" because it became associated with French explorers of the 17th century, including Étienne Brûlé, Samuel de Champlain and Pierre-Esprit Radisson, and missionaries.

Other explorers who later followed this route included Simon Fraser, Alexander Mackenzie and David Thompson.

Together with the Ottawa and Mattawa Rivers, the French River formed part of the water highway from Montreal to Lake Superior in the days of the fur trade. It remained a major canoe route until about 1820. Around 1855, the Grand Trunk Railway provided newfound access to the area and the Georgian Bay. This led to increased exploration and interest for fishing and logging during the era of the Industrial Revolution. After the Great Chicago Fire in 1871, there was a boom in logging along with the creation of Lumber barons in the Great Lakes. The French River was "ripe for the picking with its seemingly inexhaustible supply of timber and proximity to the American markets".

Near the end of the 19th century, logging became the primary activity in the area. It was later settled as a summer tourist and recreation area. For this reason, the French River was designated a Canadian Heritage River in 1985. Because of the rugged nature of the Canadian Shield country surrounding this river, large parts of this river remain relatively untouched and it is now a popular location for recreational canoeing, kayaking, photography, camping, fishing and boating.

Following bouts of overfishing, in 1994 the Ontario Ministry of Natural Resources placed a slot limit on fishing to protect prime breeding year classes and increase the trophy fish population in the French River.

== French River Waterway Provincial Park ==
French River Provincial Park
- IUCN category II (national park)
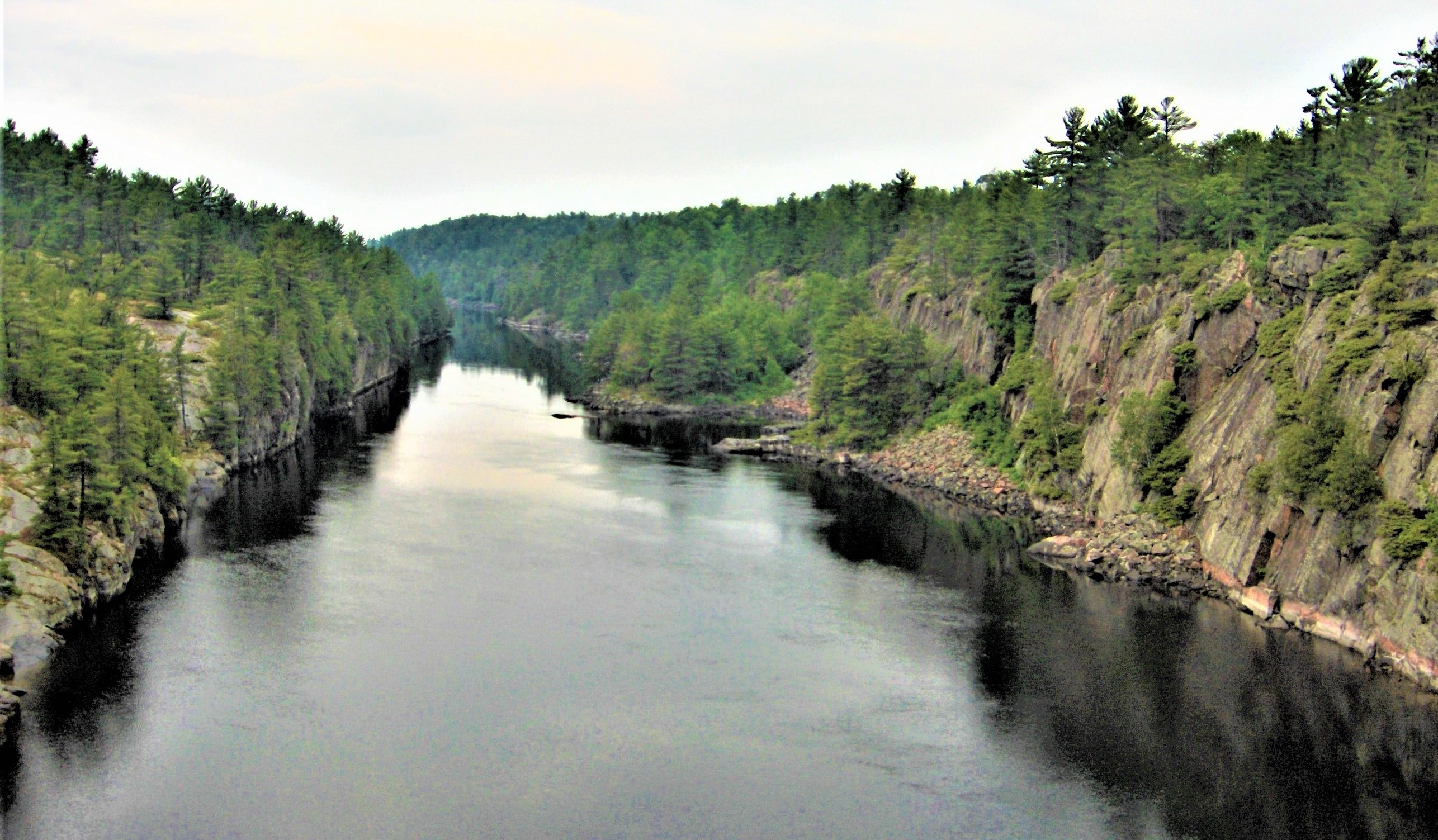
- Location: Ontario, Canada
- Nearest city: French River; Noëlville
- Coordinates: 46°01′55″N 80°19′31″W
- Area: 517.40 km^{2} (199.77 sq mi)
- Established: 1989
- Visitors: 12,124 (in 2022)
- Governing body: Ontario Parks

Most of the river's shores from Lake Nipissing to the Georgian Bay, except for the land occupied by the Dokis First Nation between the Upper, Middle and Lower French River, have been protected and designated as a provincial waterway park. There are 230 undeveloped back-country campsites available in the park along the river. French River continues to attract vacationers and cottage owners who enjoy the clear water, superb fishing, rocky shores and pine growth forests.

== See also ==
- List of rivers of Ontario
- French River, Ontario
- French River Provincial Park Visitor Centre
