= Manitou Islands (Lake Nipissing) =

Islands in Lake Nipissing in Ontario, Canada

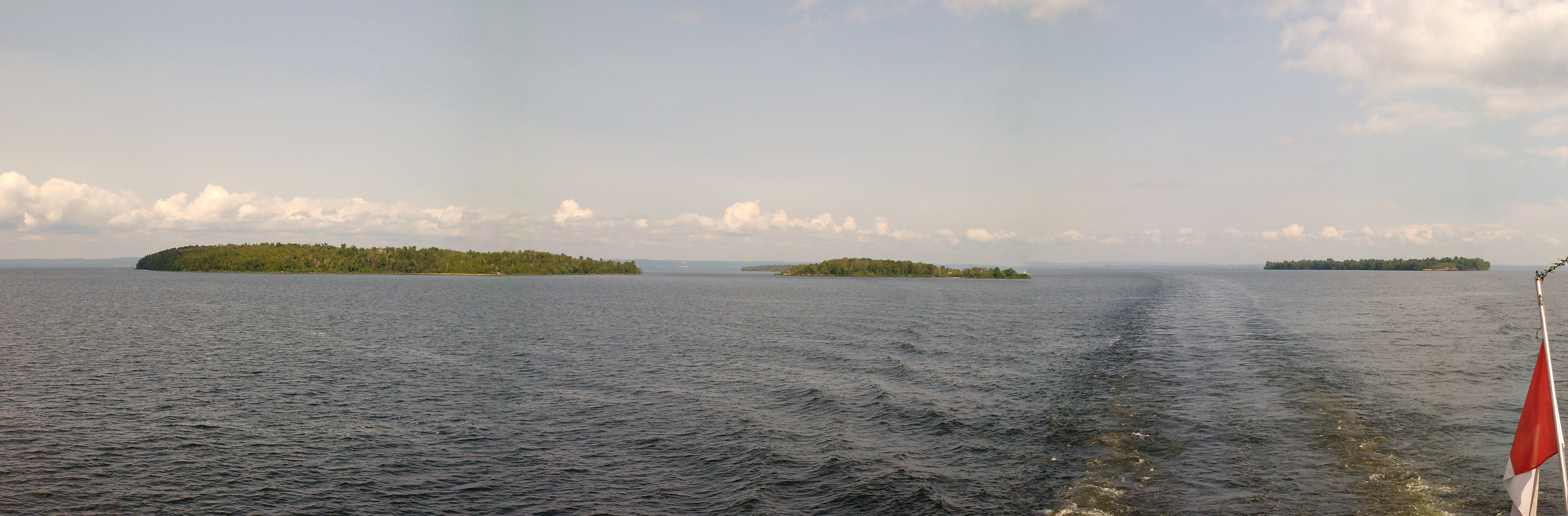

- Location within Ontario

Geography
- Coordinates: 46°16′10″N 79°33′38″W
- Adjacent to: Lake Nipissing
- Total islands: 5
- Major islands: Great Manitou, Little Manitou, Calder, Rankin, Newman

Administration
- Canada
- Province: Ontario
- District: Nipissing
- Census division: Unorg. North Nipissing

The Manitou Islands are a series of small islands in Lake Nipissing, in Nipissing District, Ontario, Canada. The islands form a circle and lie 10 kilometres (6 mi) southwest of North Bay.

== History ==
Samuel de Champlain visited the islands in 1613 and called them "pretty". Fur traders found the island a handy resting spot, and often would camp overnight. Today the islands' sand beaches continue to be a popular resting and recreation spot for many boaters.

Lime was quarried on the islands in the 1880s when the Canadian Pacific Railway was built, and a lime kiln was operated to create lime for mortar. Great Manitou Island, the largest of the islands, once held a dance hall and hotel, but it burned to the ground. Uranium mining was conducted on Newman Island in the 1950s.

Local legend says that the island is haunted by the Nipissing people who died of starvation after battling the Iroquois and being forced to flee the islands.

In 1972 the wreck of the steamship John B. Fraser was found between Goose Island and the Manitou Islands, in 14 metres (46 ft) of water.

Until 1981, the entire Great Manitou Island was privately owned. In 1982, most of it was donated to the government through the efforts of the Nature Conservancy of Canada and the Ontario Heritage Foundation. Over the following years, other individual private lots have been purchased by the government.

== Geography ==
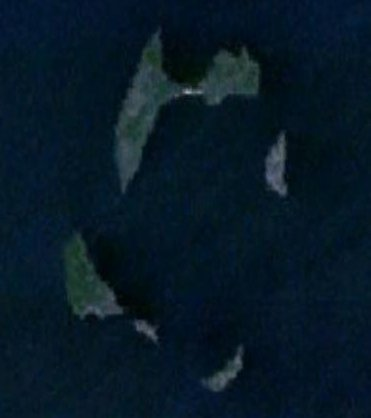
Satellite image of the Manitou Islands

The total area of the islands is 100 hectares (247 acres), and the total perimeter is 5 kilometres (3.1 mi). The five islands are:

- Great Manitou Island 46°16′41″N 79°34′34″W
- Little Manitou Island 46°15′32″N 79°35′17″W
- Calder Island 46°16′14″N 79°33′38″W
- Rankin Island 46°15′00″N 79°34′03″W
- Newman Island 46°15′17″N 79°34′45″W

== Geology ==
The Manitou Islands lie inside the Ottawa-Bonnechere Graben and are part of an eroded volcanic pipe, leaving the multiple islands. The volcanic pipe formed by the violent, supersonic eruption of a deep-origin volcano. These volcanoes originate at least three times as deep as most other volcanoes, and the resulting magma that is pushed toward the surface is high in magnesium and volatile compounds such as water and carbon dioxide. As the body of magma rises toward the surface, the volatile compounds transform to gaseous phase as pressure is reduced with decreasing depth. This sudden expansion propels the magma upward at rapid speeds, resulting in a shallow supersonic eruption.

The Manitou Islands contain the uncommon rock types of fenite and syenite. Minerals found associated with these rocks include: pyroxenites, amphibole, apatite, biotite, calcite, magnetite, monazite, nepheline, pyrite, pyrochlore, pyroxene and quartz.

The nearby Callander Bay is also a volcanic pipe.

== Provincial park ==
Manitou Islands Provincial Nature Reserve
- Manitou Islands Provincial Park
- IUCN category Ia (strict nature reserve)
- Interactive map of Manitou Islands Provincial Nature Reserve
- Nearest city: North Bay
- Coordinates: 46°15′58″N 79°34′52″W
- Area: 1,925.80 ha (7.4356 sq mi)
- Designation: Nature reserve
- Established: 1989
- Governing body: Ontario Parks
- Website: www.ontarioparks.com/park/manitouislands

The Manitou Islands Provincial Nature Reserve protects 4 of the 5 islands (as a private island, Calder Island is excluded), and also has a 1-kilometer-wide zone around the islands that protects the submarine lakebeds. It was established in 1989 and is representative of island ecology in Lake Nipissing with warmer than normal regional temperatures. Permitted activities include swimming, boating, and nature viewing.

It is a non-operating park, meaning that there are no facilities or services. The park’s beaches are available for day use only.

== Flora ==
Trees on the islands include basswood, ash, silver maple, white birch, white cedar, burr oak, and sugar maple.

Common vegetation include striped maple, chokecherry, Canada yew, stinging nettle, and poison ivy (which is prevalent in most vegetated areas).

== See also ==
- Volcanism of Canada
- Volcanism of Eastern Canada
- List of volcanoes in Canada
- Callander Bay
