= Dokis First Nation =

Dokis 9
- Indian reserve
- Dokis Indian reserve No. 9
- Location within Southern Ontario
- Coordinates: 46°04′N 80°02′W
- Country: Canada
- Province: Ontario
- District: Parry Sound
- First Nation: Dokis
- Settled: 1890s
- Formed: 1850

Government
  - Chief: Gerry Duquette
  - Federal riding: Parry Sound-Muskoka
  - Prov. riding: Parry Sound—Muskoka

Area
  - Land: 154.36 km^{2} (59.60 sq mi)

Population (2021)
  - Total: 201
  - Density: 1.3/km^{2} (3.4/sq mi)
- Time zone: UTC-5 (EST)
  - Summer (DST): UTC-4 (EDT)
- Postal Code: P0M 2N1
- Area code: 705
- Website: www.dokisfirstnation.com

Dokis 9 (Ojibwe: Okikendawt, meaning: island of buckets or island of pails) ) is a First Nations reserve and community in the Canadian province of Ontario, assigned to the Dokis First Nation. The reserve is located approximately 16 kilometres southwest of central southern Lake Nipissing along the French River. It is divided into two large parts consisting of a north island, Okikendawt, and a large southern peninsula. The two land masses, which are nestled within the flows of the French river, covers 154.36 square kilometres. The French River watershed in Northern Ontario was created more than ten thousand years ago when the last ice-age receded and left a maze of rivers and small lakes. The main settlement is found on Okikendawt island (meaning island of buckets or island of pails) which can be accessed by a gravel road which connects with Highway 64. The Land is occupied by the Dokis and its cousin tribe, the Restoule‘s. The land is well known for its hunting, fishing, fur trades, and timber.

Dokis 9 is bordered by the Unorganized Centre Parry Sound District, West Nipissing, and French River.

== History ==
In 1850, Michel "Eagle" Dokis signed the Robinson Huron Treaty. At this time the Dokis were operating a successful fur trading enterprise at Dokis point on Lake Nipissing, which is located at the west end of Nipissing First Nation. It wasn’t until the 1890s, as the trading business slowed significantly, that the Dokis moved onto the land they negotiated for and Dokis Village was established. The Restoules, a related tribe of the Dokis, also started inhabiting Dokis Village and surrounding lands. Both families grew vegetable and grain crops while maintaining some trapping activities. In 1909 pressure was put on the tribes to sell the timber rights of the Dokis lands and lumbering became a new revenue. The sale of their timber rights in 1909 made the Dokis the richest natives in Canada at that time.

== Demographics ==
As of March 2011, the registered population of the Dokis First Nation is 991 members, of whom 168 live on the reserve, 2 live on another reserve, and 821 live off reserve.

Canada census – Dokis 9 community profile

| | 2021 |
| Population | 201 (-41.6% from 2016) |
| Land area | 150.19 km^{2} (57.99 sq mi) |
| Population density | 1.3/km^{2} (3.4/sq mi) |
| Median age | 53.2 (M: 52.0, F: 55.2) |
| Private dwellings | 145 (total) 97 (occupied) |
| Median household income |

References: 2021

Historical population
| Year | Pop. | ±% |
|---|---|---|
| 1991 | 165 | — |
| 1996 | 163 | −1.2% |
| 2001 | 196 | +20.2% |
| 2006 | 195 | −0.5% |
| 2011 | 204 | +4.6% |

== Attractions ==
The French River Provincial Park protects most of the land along the French River except for the land occupied by the Dokis. Today, over 300 years after fur traders first navigated its waters, motorboats, kayaks, and canoes now travel the French River; lodges and cottages dot the landscape, and it provides an abundance of activities for anglers and hunters. For much of its length, the French River is a broad, tree-lined expanse of open water. It also features falls, rapids, and steep, narrow gorges. The difficult topography of the Canadian Shield supports more than 450 plant species, some of them rare. The Massassauga rattlesnake, the only poisonous snake in Ontario, is also found in this area. Deer, moose, elk and bear are some of the larger mammals in the area. Woodpeckers, ravens, Great Blue Herons and a variety of warbler are just some of the birds that can be found along the river’s shores.

== Fishing ==
Fish is a very important resource of the Dokis. The French River inhabits many fish including: Sturgeon, walleye, musky, northern pike, smallmouth bass, largemouth bass, rock bass, perch, catfish, and whitefish. The Dokis still use spearing and netting as techniques for catching fish today.

== Economy ==
The Dokis’s economy is derived from a number of sources including small locally owned businesses. Private and tribally owned enterprises include businesses in construction, marina operation, catering, restaurants, transportation, tourism, eco-tourism, ecology, forestry, and services to cottage owners along the French River. Some Dokis First Nation Businesses include: Cold Springs Camp, Dokis Marina, Migisi Marina, Wajashk Cottages, Riverview Cottages, J.C.A.R.L.Restoule Construction

== Notable members ==
- Eli Ankou, football defensive tackle for the Buffalo Bills

== See also ==
- List of francophone communities in Ontario
