= Callander, Ontario =

Canadian township established 1891

Callander
- Municipality (single-tier)
- Municipality of Callander
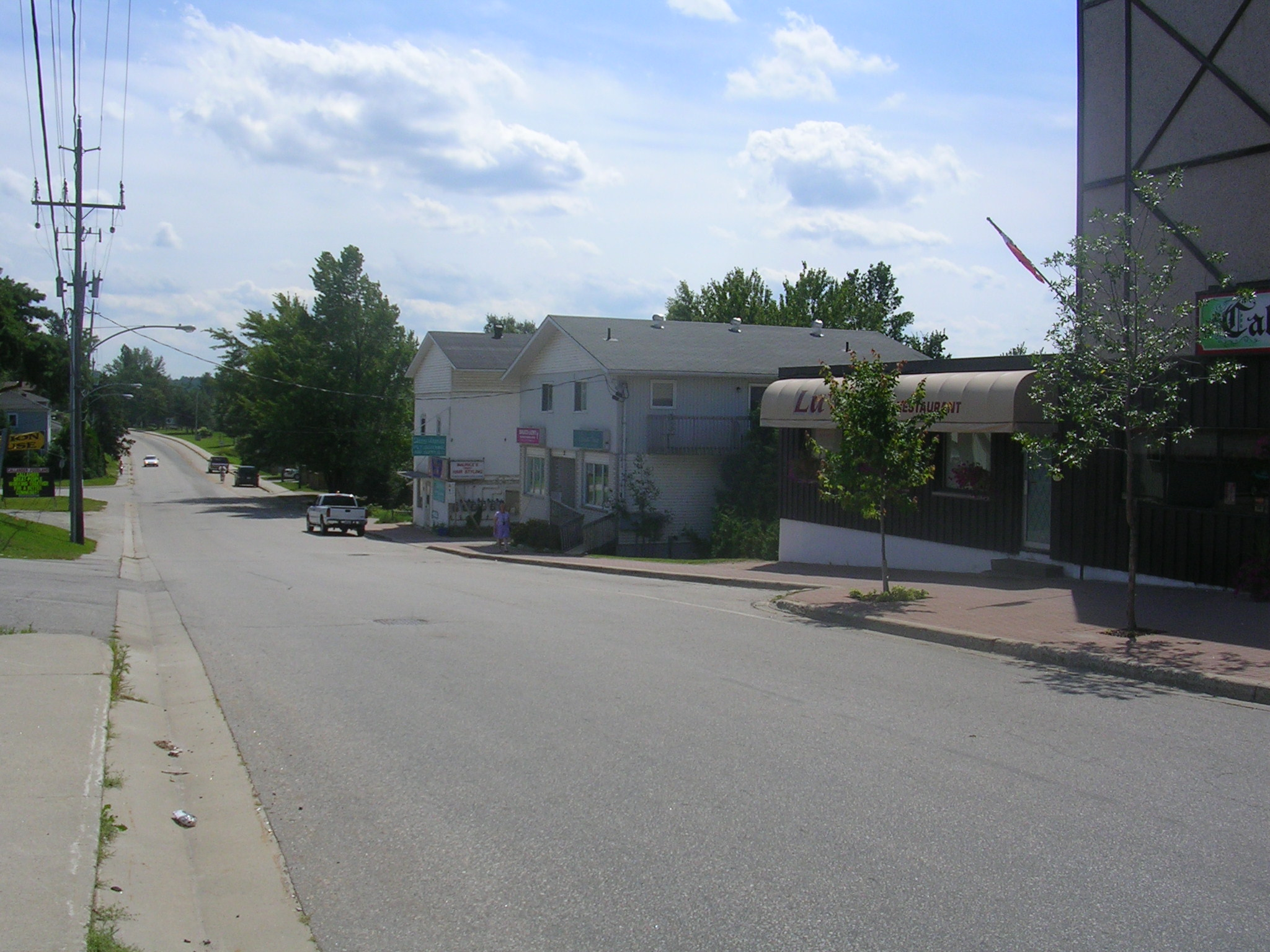
- Main Street in Callander
- Motto: Four Seasons of Reasons
- Location of Callander in Ontario
- Coordinates: 46°13′N 79°22′W
- Country: Canada
- Province: Ontario
- District: Parry Sound
- Settled: 1880s
- Incorporated: 1886

Government
  - Type: Township
  - Mayor: Robb Noon
  - MP: Pauline Rochefort
  - MPP: Vic Fedeli

Area
  - Land: 102.98 km^{2} (39.76 sq mi)

Population (2021)
  - Total: 3,964
  - Density: 38.5/km^{2} (100/sq mi)
- Time zone: UTC−5 (EST)
  - Summer (DST): UTC−4 (EDT)
- Area code: 705
- Website: www.mycallander.ca

The Municipality of Callander (formerly the Township of North Himsworth) is a township in central Ontario, Canada, located at the southeast end of Lake Nipissing in the Almaguin Highlands region of Parry Sound District. The municipality is located on Callander Bay, just south of North Bay.

The municipality renamed itself from North Himsworth to Callander in 2003, adopting the name of its major community because, in the words of then-mayor Bill Brazeau, "Nobody knew where North Himsworth was."

Callander Bay is an eroded Proterozoic volcanic pipe formed by the violent, supersonic eruption of a deep-origin volcano, approximately 500 million years ago. It is one of eight known volcanic sites in Ontario, including the Manitou Islands in North Bay.

== Communities ==
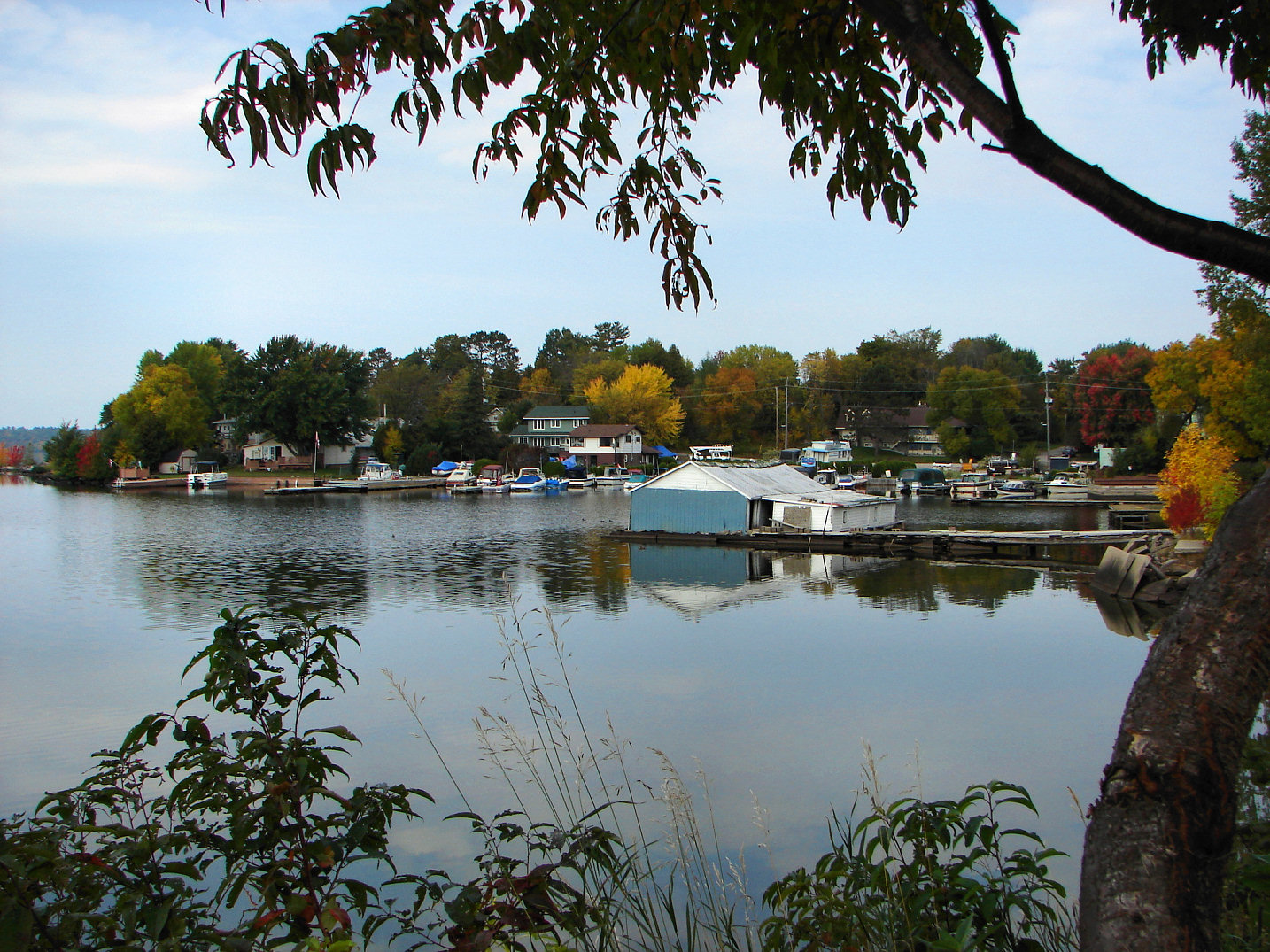
Marina on Callander Bay

The main community of Callander is located in the northeast corner of the municipality, along the eastern shore of Callander Bay.

The south shore of Callander Bay and Lake Nipissing (southwest of the town) represents the rural population of Callander, which primarily runs along Highway 654 West. This area includes the communities of Wisawasa and Lighthouse Beach.

== History ==
The first people in the Callander area were of Ojibwa and Algonquin descent who have lived around Lake Nipissing for about 9,400 years. Though in history known by many names, they are currently known as Nipissing First Nation. They are generally considered part of the Anishinaabe peoples, a grouping which includes the Odaawaa, Ojibwe and Algonquins.

In 1610, French explorer Samuel de Champlain sent a young apprentice, Étienne Brûlé, to live with the Wendat natives at Georgian Bay. While en route, Brûlé discovered Lake Nipissing via the La Vase River Portage (approximately 3 km north of Callander) and established a major fur trading route linking the Ottawa River with the upper Great Lakes. Other explorers who used the La Vase Portage were Samuel de Champlain in 1615, Pierre Gaultier de Varennes, sieur de La Vérendrye in 1731, Alexander Henry the elder in 1761 and Sir Alexander MacKenzie in 1802.

In 1876, Himsworth Township was surveyed and named after William Alfred Himsworth. It was divided into North and South Himsworth 10 years later and incorporated at that time.

In 1880, George Morrison, a bookkeeper from Oxford County in Southern Ontario travelled by ox-cart from Muskoka to Lake Nipissing. There he built a raft and floated his family and possessions across the lake to the south-east bay. Logging companies had taken interest in the abundant Eastern White Pine that grew in the area. He was one of its first pioneers and his wife was the first white woman. On June 1, 1881, he opened a Post Office in his general store and named it after his parents' Scottish birthplace of Callander. Several years later, the Northern and Pacific Junction Railway was built through the township, benefitting the local lumber industry.

Lumber companies that established mills in Callander included:

- J.R. Booth Lumber Company
- John B. Smith & Sons Lumber Company
- Payette Lumber Company
- Thomas Darling & Sons Lumber Company

== Demographics ==
In the 2021 Census of Population conducted by Statistics Canada, Callander had a population of 3,964 living in 1,636 of its 1,758 total private dwellings, a change of 2.6% from its 2016 population of 3,863. With a land area of 102.98 km^{2} (39.76 sq mi), it had a population density of 38.5/km^{2} (99.7/sq mi) in 2021.

Historical census populations – Callander, Ontario

Year	Pop.	±%
1911	1,019	—
1921	1,078	+5.8%
1931	1,493	+38.5%
1941	1,268	−15.1%
1951	1,289	+1.7%
1956	1,538	+19.3%
1961	1,845	+20.0%

Year	Pop.	±%
1966	1,979	+7.3%
1971	2,248	+13.6%
1976	2,322	+3.3%
1981	2,546	+9.6%
1986	2,695	+5.9%
1991	2,993	+11.1%
1996	3,168	+5.8%

Year	Pop.	±%
2001	3,177	+0.3%
2006	3,579	+12.7%
2011	3,864	+8.0%
2016	3,863	−0.0%
2021	3,964	+2.6%

2006 Population figure based on revised count.
Source: Statistics Canada

== Notable people ==
Prominent people who have lived in Callander include:

- The Dionne Quintuplets, the world's first surviving quintuplets (born May 28, 1934) who rose to international fame at the height of the Great Depression.
- Dr. Allan Roy Dafoe (1883–1943), doctor to the Dionne Quintuplets and recipient of the Order of the British Empire. His former home on Lansdowne Street is now the Callander Bay Heritage Museum.
- Bill Barber (born 1952), NHL hockey player for the Philadelphia Flyers from 1972 to 1984; inductee into the Hockey Hall of Fame.
- Stan Darling (1911–2004), Progressive Conservative Member of Parliament for Parry Sound-Muskoka from 1972 to 1993. In 1991, Canadian prime minister Brian Mulroney and U.S. President George H. W. Bush paid tribute to Darling for his 10-year crusade to reduce sulphur dioxide emissions, the cause of acid rain, at the signing of the Canada-U.S. Air Quality Accord.
- Louise de Kiriline Lawrence (1894–1992), Swedish-born, internationally renowned naturalist, author and nurse; wrote for National Audubon Society magazine; winner of the 1969 Burroughs Medal
- Taylor Milne (born 1981), middle-distance runner, competed in two summer Olympiads: 2008 and 2016.
- Michael J. Fox (born 1961), actor. Lived there one year.

== See also ==
- List of townships in Ontario
- List of francophone communities in Ontario
