= Sanfilippodytes bertae =

Scientific classification
- Kingdom: Animalia
- Phylum: Arthropoda
- Clade: Pancrustacea
- Class: Insecta
- Order: Coleoptera
- Suborder: Adephaga
- Family: Dytiscidae
- Subfamily: Hydroporinae
- Tribe: Hydroporini
- Genus: Sanfilippodytes
- Species: S. bertae

Binomial name
- Sanfilippodytes bertae Roughley & Larson, 2000

Species of beetle

Sanfilippodytes bertae, or Bert's predaceous diving beetle, is listed as an endangered species of beetle currently residing in southern Alberta, Canada, and is protected under the federal Species at Risk Act. It has no current subspecies. The species belongs to the taxonomy of arthropods, kingdom Animalia, class Insecta, order Coleoptera, superfamily Dytiscoidea and family Dytiscidae.

== Habitat and distribution ==
Globally, Sanfilippodytes bertae currently resides in the only habitat it is known to survive, Southern Alberta, Canada, and its location has remained unaltered since the discovery of the beetle's habitat in 1984. Since 2007, the last time the beetle's additional localities were explored, no new habitats were discovered. Its historic distribution is located along the north banks of the Oldman River, east of Fort Macleod. There is no recovery plan that is in place to protect the species. The only other region where the beetle has been spotted is called the "Oasis". This area is located in Head-Smashed-In Buffalo Jump, in southern Alberta, is in close proximity to the Oldman River, and has the same ecosystem present to support the life of the species' specific needs. The Oasis however, is slightly different in that it is an area that is five to eight metres below the landscape of low vegetation and hills. The area faces Highway 785 and contains a spring that exits a rock crevice and drains into a narrow channel that meets with a stagnant channel surrounded by soil, wet moss, algae, and trees. This area is distinguished by low vegetation, and a cliff that drops off below the normal landscape of smooth hills, which are prone to high winds, mosses, and algae. This strict cut off location is the main reason why the beetle is endangered, as it is geographically restricted, and as a whole, the area of occupancy is only 2 m^{2}.

There have been no efforts for the salvation of the beetle’s population. Since the predaceous diving beetle is limited to springs and seepage areas, the main problem with the lack of recovery for Sanfilippodytes bertae is habitat loss. A lowering water level in the Oldman River basin as well as aggregation of livestock, agricultural irrigation, rapid growth in human population, and thus a higher demand for water, would dry up the habitat as well. In addition, cattle's trampling and defecating, and ranch vehicles would damage the outlets of springs and seepages which would create muddier conditions, destroying the habitat.

The general trend for the predacious diving beetle is an area with springs, seepage areas, and fine grained sands, algae, and mosses, which would signify an undisturbed area. Since the beetle requires a very specific habitat, threats to the species are indirect, as destruction of their habitat would leave the beetle with no place to reside. A lowering water level in the Oldman River basin as well as aggregation of livestock, agricultural irrigation, rapid growth in human population, and thus a higher demand for water, would dry up the habitat. In addition, cattle's trampling and defecating, and ranch vehicles would damage the outlets of springs and seepages which would create muddier conditions, destroying the habitat. The reason scientists predict why Bert's predacious diving beetle has such a small population in an isolated and specific habitat is because of the size of the beetle, and the windy conditions that would inhibit long distance travelling. Currently, there is no effort to protect the beetle itself, as it is not globally or regionally listed. The same goes for the beetle's niche habitat, which makes it difficult to predict the fate of Sanfilippodytes bertae's survival.

== Conservation status ==
The Bert's predacious diving beetle was the first dytiscid to be assessed in November 2009 by the Committee on the Status of Endangered Wildlife in Canada.
