= Lake Nipissing =

Lake in Ontario, Canada

- Gichi-nibiinsing-zaaga’igan (Ojibwe); Lac des Sorcières (French)
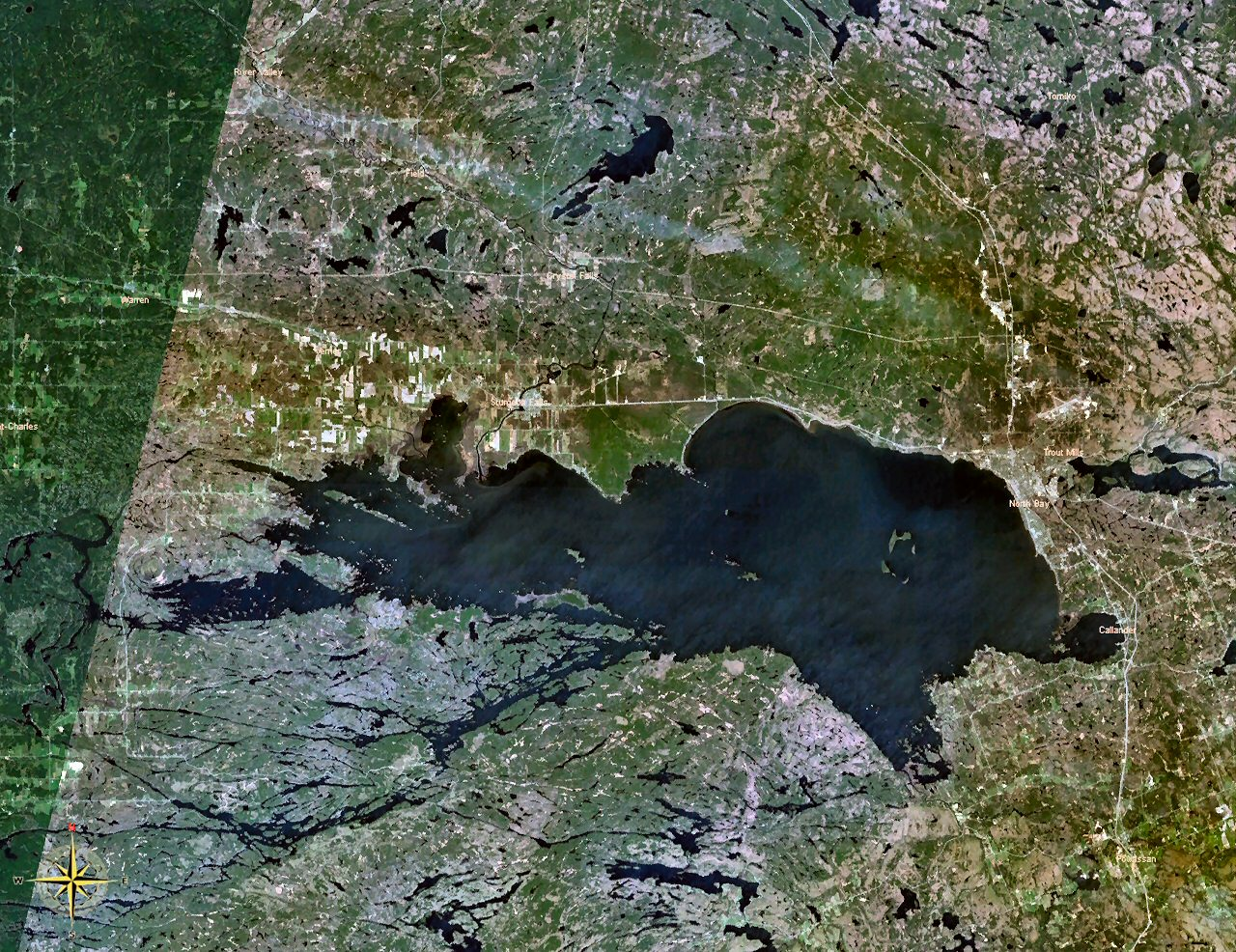
- Satellite view of Lake Nipissing

- Location in Ontario
- Location: Ontario
- Coordinates: 46°16′12″N 079°47′24″W
- Type: Mesotrophic
- Etymology: Ojibwe nibiinsing, meaning "at little water"
- Primary inflows: Sturgeon River, South River, Rivière Veuve
- Primary outflows: French River
- Catchment area: 12,300 km^{2} (4,700 sq mi)
- Basin countries: Canada
- Max. length: 65 km (40 mi)
- Max. width: 25 km (16 mi)
- Surface area: 873.3 km^{2} (337.2 sq mi)
- Average depth: 4.5 m (15 ft)
- Max. depth: 64 m (210 ft)
- Water volume: 3.8 km^{3} (0.91 cu mi)
- Shore length^{1}: 795 km (494 mi) (+ 619 km (385 mi) islands)
- Surface elevation: 196 m (643 ft)
- Islands: Numerous
- Settlements: North Bay
- ^{1} Shore length is not a well-defined measure.

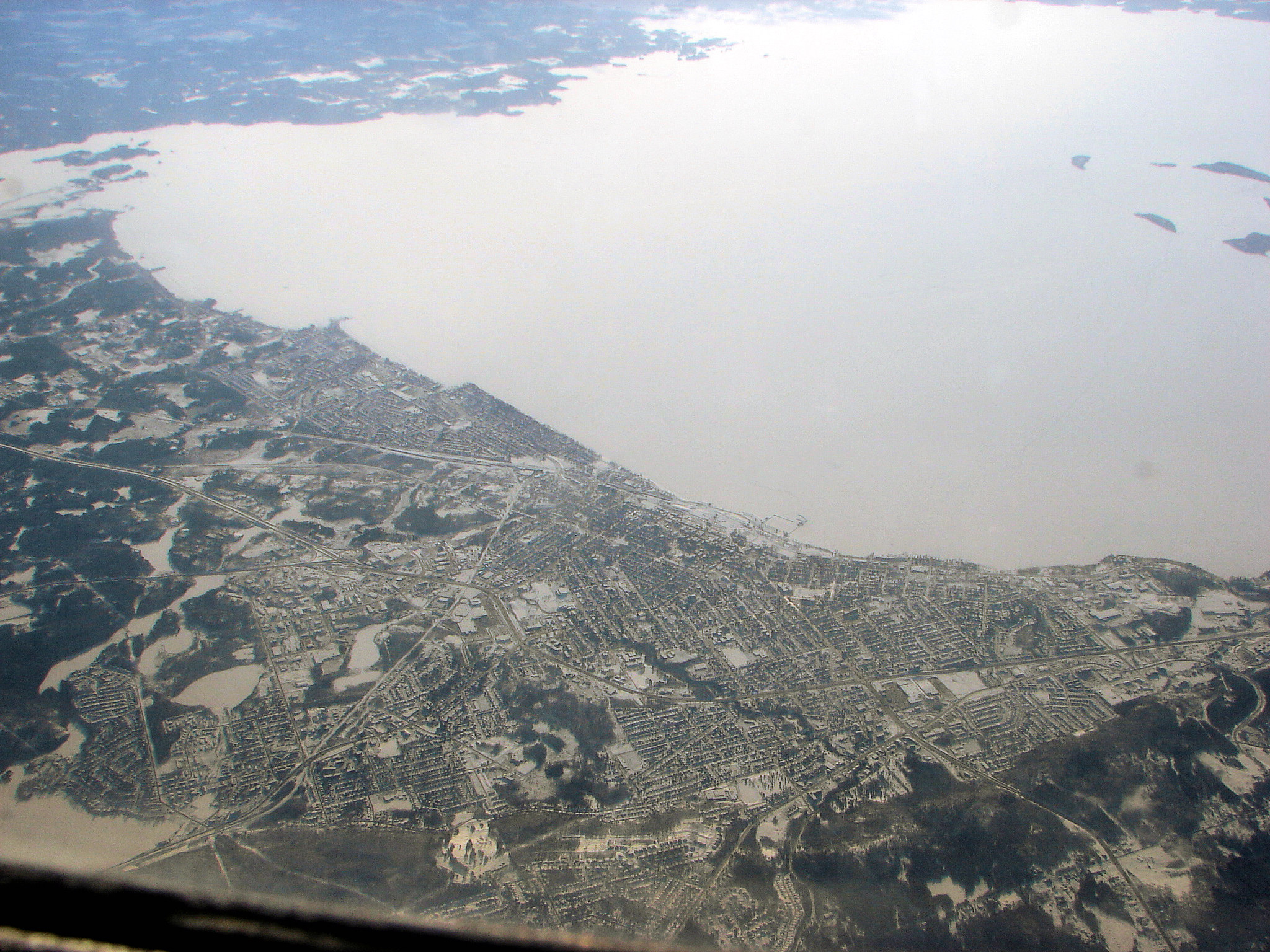
Aerial view of Lake Nipissing and North Bay

Lake Nipissing (/ˈnɪpəsɪŋ/; French: lac Nipissing, Ojibwe: ᑭᒋᓂᐲᓐᓯᓐᓵᑲᐃᑲᓐ, romanized: Gichi-nibiinsing-zaaga’igan) is a lake in the Canadian province of Ontario. It has a surface area of 873.3 km^{2} (337.2 sq mi), a mean elevation of 196 m (643 ft) above sea level, and is located between the Ottawa River and Georgian Bay. Lake Nipissing is the third-largest lake entirely in Ontario. It is relatively shallow for a large lake, with an average depth of only 4.5 m (15 ft). The shallowness of the lake makes for many sandbars along the lake's irregular shoreline. The lake reaches a maximum depth of 64 m (210 ft) near the mouth of the French River, off the shore of Blueberry Island. The lake has many islands most of which are protected under the Protection of Significant Wetlands scheme, controlled by the Ministry of Natural Resources and Forestry.

The largest population centre on the lake's shoreline is the city of North Bay. North Bay sits along the lake's northeastern shoreline. Other notable towns include Callander (south of North Bay along Highway 11). The larger towns toward the western end of the lake are Sturgeon Falls, Garden Village, Cache Bay and Lavigne.

== Etymology ==
The name of the lake in the Anishnaabe language of the surrounding First Nation communities (Dokis and Nipissing First Nations) is Gichi-nibiinsing-zaaga’igan, meaning "Big little-water lake" though other families understand the translation differently. The name "Nipissing" was also given to many places in the area, notably the Township of Nipissing, Nipissing District, and Nipissing University.

== Geography and history ==
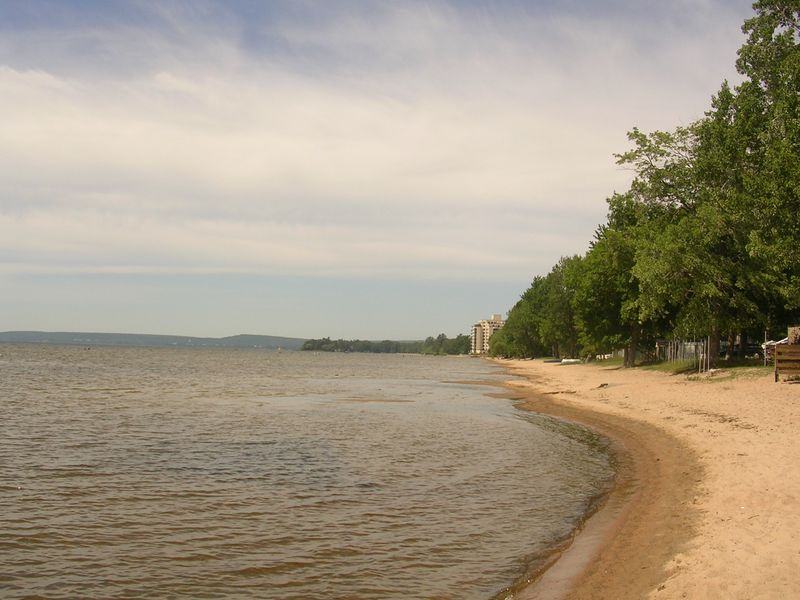
A beach along Lake Nipissing

Lake Nipissing drains into Georgian Bay, which is a part of Lake Huron, via the French River. Lake Nipissing lies about 25 km (16 mi) northwest of Algonquin Provincial Park. The French fur trader Étienne Brûlé was the first European to visit the lake in 1610. Jean Nicolet, another French trader and explorer had a "cabin and trading-house" for eight or nine years living among the Indigenous people on the shores of Lake Nipissing until 1633 when he was recalled to Quebec to become Commissary and Indian Interpreter for the "Company of the Hundred Associates." In a map dated 1776, the lake is still referred to with its French name "Lac des Sorcières".

During the American Revolutionary War, Lake Nipissing was proposed as the boundary in the instructions of the Continental Congress to John Adams, the Commissioner appointed to negotiate a treaty of peace with Great Britain.

The first permanent European settlement on the lake dates from around 1874 with a trading post of the Hudson's Bay Company on the northwest corner in what is now Sturgeon Falls. In 1882 the North-West Mounted Police established their presence on the north east shore.

The lake contains over 40 different species of fish. Numerous sport fishing lodges dot the main shoreline and can also be found on several of Nipissing's many islands. Most anglers target walleye, smallmouth bass, muskie, and northern pike. For various reasons, largely social, numerous stocking associations are engaged in attempts to manage the lake's walleye population.

In the days of fur trade, coureur des bois and later voyageurs travelled through the lake by canoe via the Mattawa and French rivers. When the fur trade started to decline in the 1880s, logging became the main economic activity. After World War I, the primary economic activity became tourism and recreation, although logging still contributes a significant economic stimulus to the area.

Unlike most lakes in Ontario, Lake Nipissing contains two volcanic pipes, which are the Manitou Islands and Callander Bay. The volcanic pipes formed by the violent, supersonic eruption of deep-origin volcanoes. Lake Nipissing lies in the Ottawa-Bonnechere Graben, a Mesozoic era rift valley that formed 175 million years ago.

== Flora and fauna ==
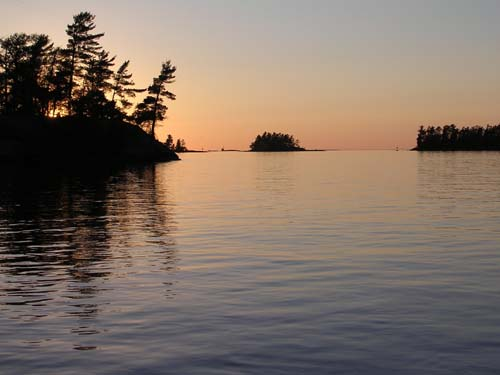
Sunset at Lake Nipissing

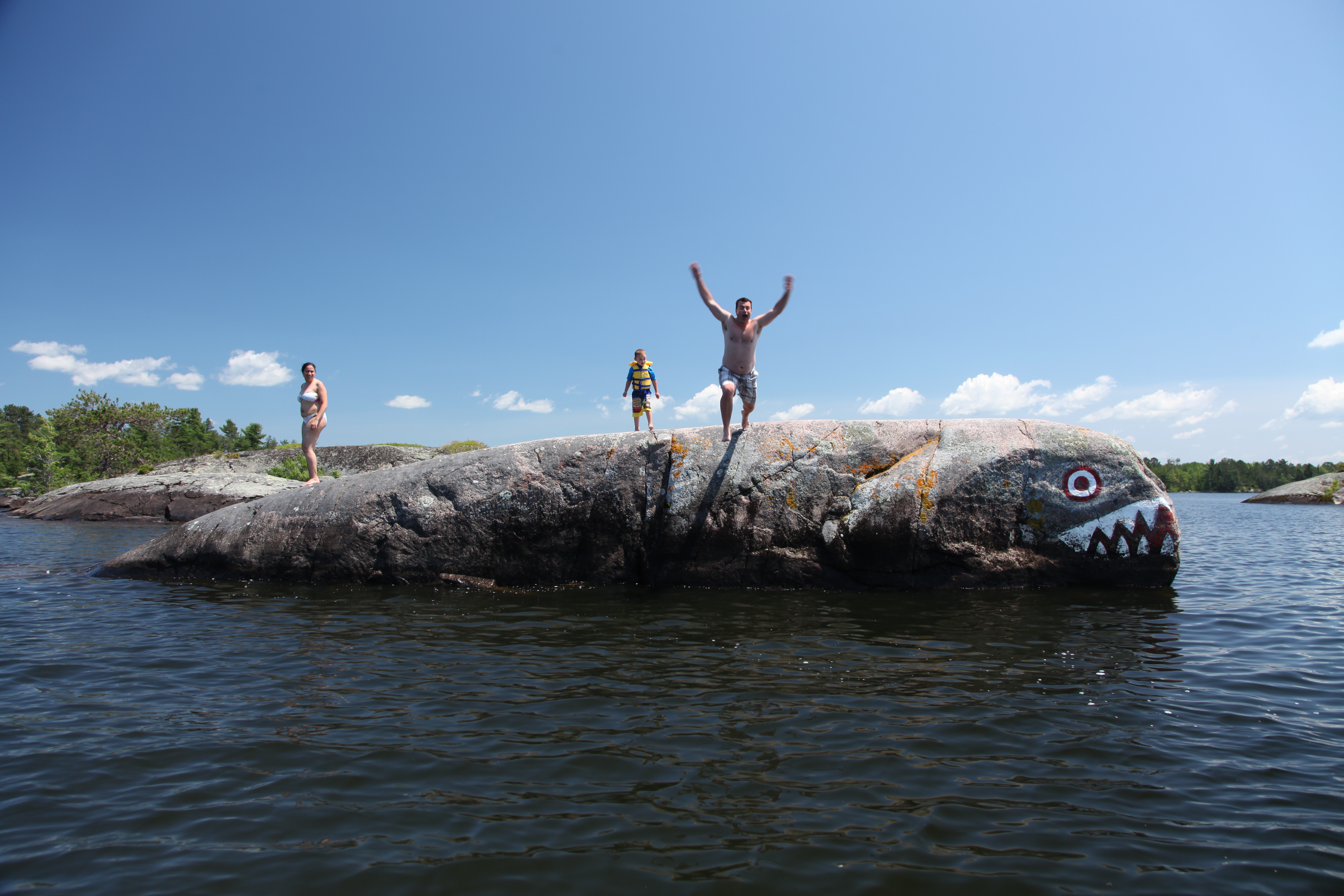
People playing on the Lake Nipissing "whale"

The lake is home to an abundance of flora and fauna: white pine is significant, however, broadleaf trees such as aspen, ash, birch, maple and oak predominate some of the larger islands. Juniper, sumac, scrub oak, oak ferns and poison ivy can also be found. As well as much prized fish species, Nipissing wildlife includes moose, beaver, bald eagle, ospreys and turtles.

=== Flora ===
The lakeshore and islands are densely covered with broadleaved trees. Some of the larger islands on the lake such as Garden Island are almost exclusively broadleaf with maple, oak and dogwood. Many trees species can be found on and around the lake including:

- White pine which dominates the smaller rocky islands on the lake.
- Ash (black, mountain, red and white)
- Aspen (trembling and largetooth)
- Beech
- Birch (white and yellow)
- Dogwood
- Elm
- Ironwood
- Maple (silver, striped and sugar)
- Oak (burr and red)

=== Fauna ===
Fish - the lake is famous for the plethora of fish and the sport they provide. Of the 44 fish species to be found in Lake Nipissing, the significant include:

- Northern pike
- Muskie (clear or barred and spotted)
- Walleye
- Gar
- Smallmouth bass
- Yellow perch
- Cisco or lake herring
- Whitefish
- Burbot
- two species deemed to be 'at risk' by the Ministry of Natural Resources and Forestry; the northern brook lamprey and lake sturgeon

Mammals - Many mammals frequent the shores and islands of the lake, including:

- Moose
- Wolf
- Black bear
- Marten
- Fisher
- Red squirrel
- Chipmunk
- Beaver
- Muskrat
- Hare

Birds - These separate naturally into resident or visiting species, including:

- Bald eagle
- Osprey
- Great blue heron
- Mallard
- Gull
- Common loon
- Double crested cormorant
- Great horned owl
- Trumpeter swan

and a huge variety of ducks and geese.

== See also ==
- List of lakes of Ontario
