= Missanabie (disambiguation) =

Missanabie is a community in Algoma District, Ontario, Canada:

Missanabie may also refer to:

- Missanabie Cree First Nation, a First Nation band in Ontario
- Missanabie 62, a reserve of the Michipicoten First Nation

== See also ==
- Missinaibi River, a river in Ontario
