= John Thomas (fur trader) =

Canadian fur trader

John Thomas (or Thompson, c. 1751 – June 9, 1822) was a Canadian fur trader who played a significant role in the exploration and establishment of posts by the Hudson's Bay Company (HBC) in North America.

== Early life ==
Born in London, England, Thomas later moved to modern-day Canada and married Margaret, an Indigenous Canadian woman, with whom he had nine children.

== Career ==
The Conquest of New France led to that part of Canada being put under British rule. Following this, the Hudson's Bay Company faced increased competition from independent traders from Quebec. To counter this, the HBC told its officers to seek new trading opportunities in the uncharted regions of Canada, and set up new posts. In 1774, Thomas and three Indigenous Canadian guides were sent by the Moose Factory council to chart the passage to Lake Abitibi. Thomas became the first HBC officer to visit Fort Abitibi, which was operated by traders from Quebec. He described the place and its inhabitants in detail, and conducted further explorations in the Moose Factory area, travelling east and west to lay the groundwork for future HBC posts in the region.

In 1777, the Hudson's Bay Company built Wapiscogamy House as a stopping point on the route toward Lake Superior. However, due to navigational difficulties on the Michipicoten River, Thomas instead settled on Missinaibi Lake. The scarcity of local provisions necessitated frequent returns to Wapiscogamy House, prompting Thomas to delegate the management of Missinaibi to his servants. In 1782, Thomas became the chief at Moose Factory, succeeding Edward Jarvis. Although he claimed that the company's rivals were using underhand tactics (such as assaulting Indigenous people who took employment at HCB factories), he successfully defended the HBC's posts against the expansion of the rival North West Company in James Bay. By 1806, the NWC abandoned its stations in the area.

In 1810, the HBC reduced costs and spending in response to economic difficulty. This included financial moderation and profit sharing for senior trading positions. Thomas remained as chief at Moose Factory, discharging his responsibilities under the jurisdiction of the Southern Department's superintendent. In 1813, he was dismissed on account of purported mismanagement and non-compliance with the stipulated requirements of the new system. The latter notably emphasised the imperative of agricultural development at Moose Factory. Instead of going back to England, Thomas moved to Vaudreuil in Lower Canada with his family, where he lived until he died in 1822. His widow, Meenish, remarried and administered his estate.

== Personal life ==
Thomas had a daughter named Ann, who married Alexander Christie, a prominent figure who later became the governor of Assiniboia. One of Thomas's sons, Charles, gained recognition as a trader along the Ottawa River and at Golden Lake in Ontario.

After Margaret died in 1813, he married Meenish. Thomas died on June 9, 1822, and was buried on June 12 in the Christ Church cemetery in Montreal.
