= Michipicoten Provincial Park =

Park in Ontario, Canada

- IUCN category III (natural monument or feature)
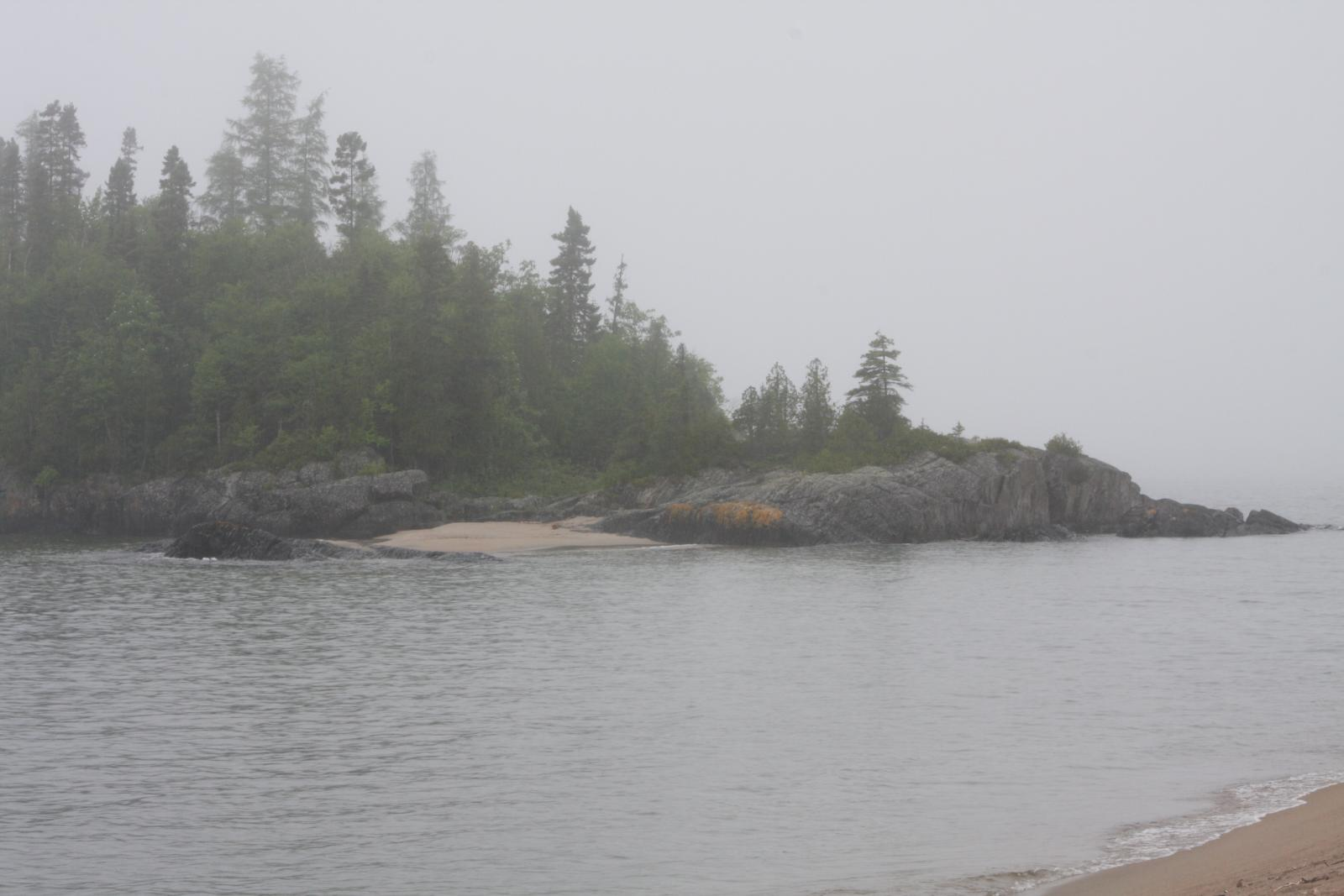

- Location within Ontario
- Location: Unorg. Algoma, Ontario, Canada
- Nearest town: Wawa
- Coordinates: 47°55′31″N 84°50′15″W
- Area: 289.00 ha (714.1 acres)
- Established: 1982
- Governing body: Ontario Parks

Michipicoten Provincial Park is a park in Ontario, Canada, located at the mouth of the Michipicoten River. The park preserves the ruins of a French trading post that operated from the early 1700s until it was abandoned by the Hudson’s Bay Company in 1904.

It is a non-operating park, meaning there are no facilities or services. Fishing and hiking are the only permitted activities.

== History ==
French explorers, including Radisson and Groseilliers, reached the area by the mid 17th century, and a post was built early in the next century (possibly about 1700). The site was on the sandy flat delta of the Michipicoten River, on the south bank opposite the mouth of the Magpie River. It was at the junction of the main North American fur trade route from Montreal westward and the route north to James Bay via the Missinaibi River. In 1727, Pierre Gaultier de Varennes, sieur de La Vérendrye, was appointed commander of the French Postes du Nord, that included the headquarters at Fort Kaministiquia, a post at the Nipigon River, and the outpost at Michipicoten. These posts on the north shore of Lake Superior were the main source of fur supply from the west and northwest. In 1739, Claude Marin de la Perrière and Louis-Césaire Dagneau Douville de Quindre were granted licenses to trade at Michipicoten Post. When the British conquered Canada in 1763, this post was abandoned by the French.

Four years later, it was re-opened on the same site by independent fur traders Alexander Henry the elder and Jean Baptiste Cadotte. The route from James Bay was explored by Edward Jarvis (1775) and Philip Turnor (1781). In 1777, the post was purchased by fur traders Jean-Baptiste Nolin and Venance Lemaire Saint-Germain. In 1783, it was taken over by the North West Company, based in Montreal. In 1797, the Hudson's Bay Company (HBC) built a rival post on the north bank to compete directly with the original fort.

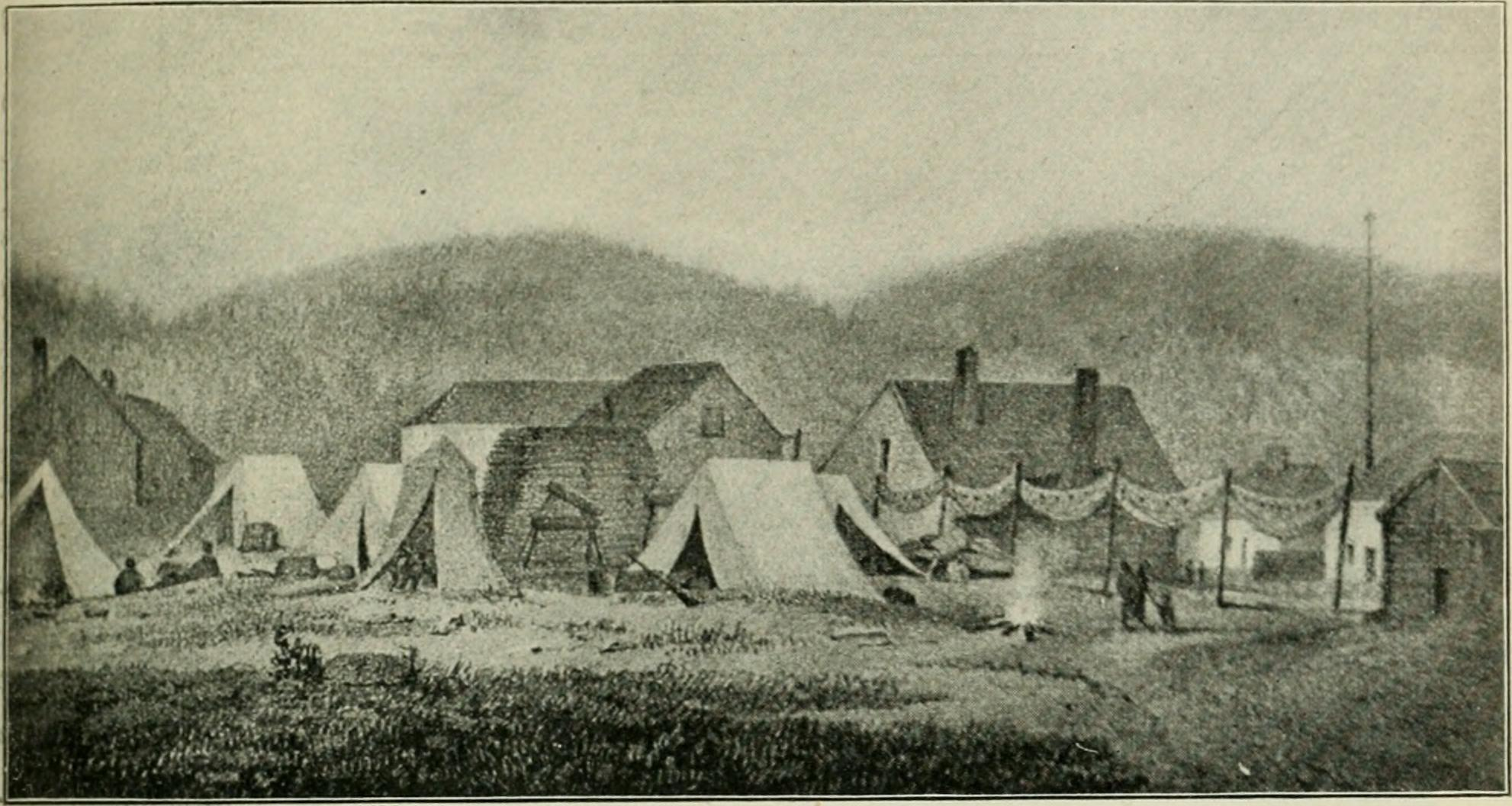
Michipicoten Post in 1848

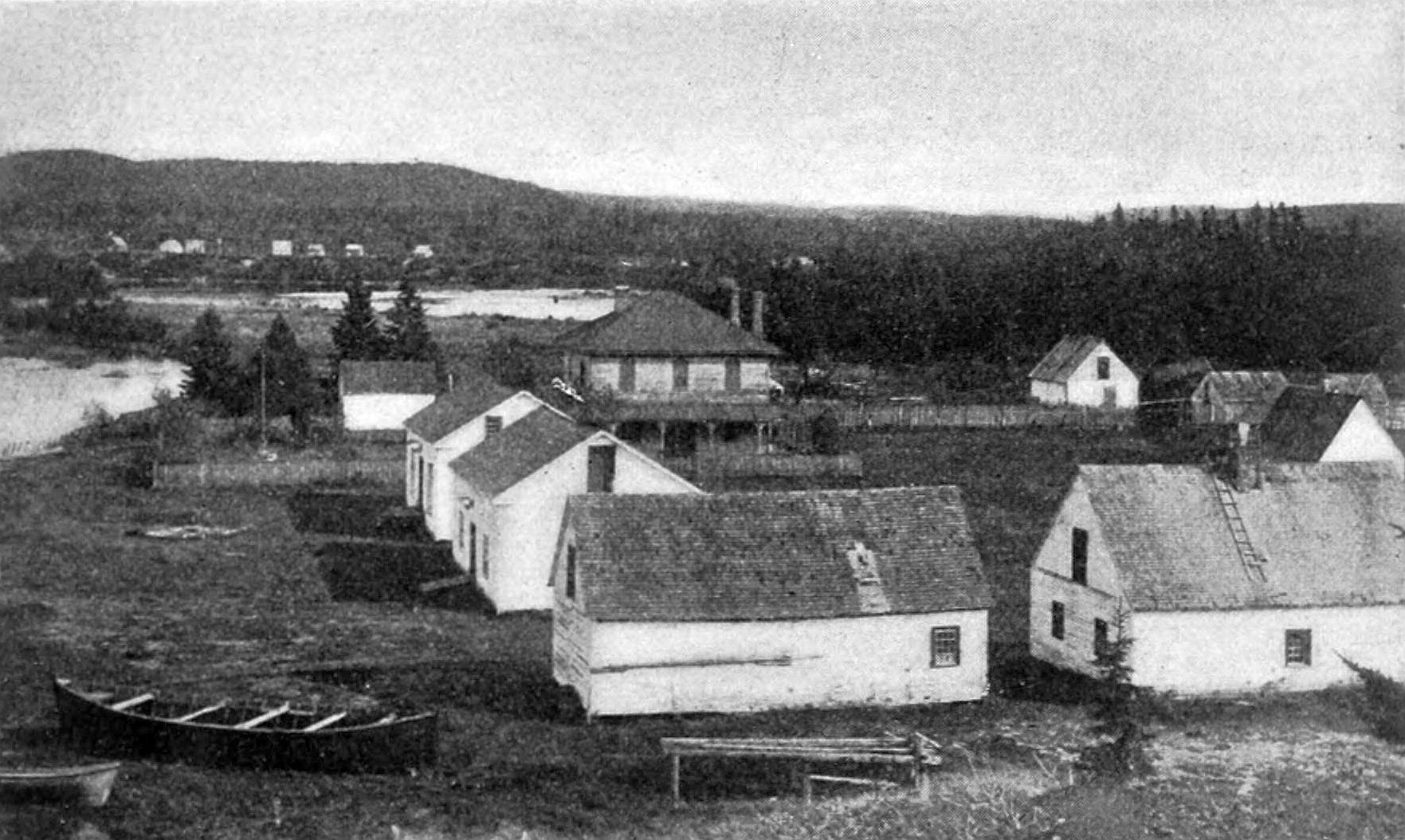
Michipicoten Post in 1897

With the union of the two companies in 1821, the HBC took over the original fort, and it gained importance because the Lake Superior trade was diverted from Montreal to Hudson Bay via Michipicoten. From 1827, the fort was the headquarters of the Superior Division, making it the main HBC post on the north shore of Lake Superior. Several HBC annual meetings were held there. It was a centre for fishing, boat-building, and small-scale manufacture and repair. From there a number of smaller posts along Lake Superior and in the interior were supplied, and it also served as a base for missionaries and surveyors. This lasted until 1863, when the arrival of steamboats and railways made it unnecessary. When gold was discovered nearby, the Michipicoten Post boomed again, supplying the many prospectors. It became the first mining division office in Ontario in 1898. But the gold rush was short-lived and the post was closed in 1904, gradually taken apart. In subsequent years, the land was used for farming.

In 1969, the site was examined by archaeologists. They discovered 16 buildings that were arranged in a square with a large open court in the centre. During other digs, evidence of an Indigenous burial site and camp were found, as well as artifacts dating as far back as 1100 A.D. indicating that the place had been used by the Indigenous people for centuries.

By 1980 the site held little more than a grassy clearing, some foundation stones, and the remains of the dock.
