= Missanabie Cree First Nation =

- Band No. 223
- Missanabie Cree First Nation
- People: Cree
- Treaty: Treaty 9
- Headquarters: Garden River
- Province: Ontario

Land
- Main reserve: Missanabie Cree First Nation
- Land area: 38.923 km^{2} (15.028 sq mi)

Population
- On reserve: 3
- On other land: 2
- Off reserve: 491
- Total population: 496

Website
- https://www.missanabiecreefn.com/

Missanabie Cree First Nation (Cree: masinâpôy ininiwak, ᒪᓯᓈᐴᔾ ᐃᓂᓂᐗᐠ) is a "Treaty 9" Nation. The nation is named after Missinaibi River and Lake, around which the traditional territory of the nation is located. The name "Missanabie" means "Pictured Water", referring to pictographs found on rock faces along Missinaibi River.

The communities' mother tongue is Moose Cree, also referred to as the "L-dialect" of Cree language.

== Historical Timeline ==
Evidence and records suggest that by as early as the 1570s, members of the Missanabie Cree had settled in the areas surrounding present day Missinaibi Lake, Dog Lake and Wabatongushi Lake. According to Elders’ testimony and anthropological evidence, the Missanabie Cree had utilized these lands from time immemorial to hunt, fish and trap for food, for ceremonial purposes and to provide for the cultural, spiritual and economic well being of their people.

In the 1660s Father Allouez confirmed that the Cree people regularly traveled between Lake Superior and James Bay.

In the 1730s Cree speaking people with summer encampments at Bawating (Sault Ste. Marie) gathered to fish, trade and do ceremonies.

In 1904 the Indian Affairs Department recognized Missanabie Cree as an Indian band to be ‘treated with’ by Treaty Commissioners for the purpose of adhesions to Treaty 9 scheduled for 1905.

In 1905 Canada and Ontario enter into Treaty 9 with various Cree and Ojibwa groups to obtain surrender of 130,000 square miles (340,000 km^{2}) of land.

In 1906 the Crown did not sign formal adhesions to Treaty 9 with the Missanabie Cree First Nation. The Crown did not set apart any reserve for 98 members of the First Nation living at Missanabie.

In 1915 Missanabie Cree's request for land was turned down by the Department of Indian Affairs and Northern Development (DIAND).

In 1925 the Chapleau Crown Preserve was created which abrogated Missanabie Cree's treaty rights to hunt and fish for subsistence living.

In 1929 Missanabie Cree's request for land was turned down by DIAND.

In 1951 Missanabie Cree were formally recognized by DIAND as an Indian band.

In 1992, under the Indian Act, the first Chief and Council are elected by the Missanabie Cree First Nation.

In 1993 Missanabie Cree First Nation submitted specific claim for outstanding Treaty Land Entitlement (TLE).

In 1996 Missanabie Cree First Nation received a letter from Canada accepting the claim, with the condition that Ontario, also a signatory to Treaty 9, be at the table. Ontario began a legal review of the claim.

In 1998 Missanabie Cree and Canada begin preliminary meetings in April.

In 1999 jointly funded studies began. These included genealogical, traditional use, site selections, and loss of use. Legal review by Ontario was completed in June. A letter from Canada stated that negotiations could begin, if Ontario came to the table.

In 2000 the Ontario Native Affairs Secretariat sent a letter indicating Ontario would be presenting its position.

In 2001 preliminary discussions of the negotiation process began between First Nation and both levels of government. The development of a work plan and negotiation framework continued.

In 2006 Ontario agreed to a land transfer of 15 square miles (39 km^{2}) with conditions attached. The transferred land was to be credited towards the eventual settlement of the land claim (to be determined through legal action). Land area was selected. Discussions with Canada continued over additions to Reserve process and loss of use compensation.

In 2008 Missanabie turned down an offer of $30 million from Canada.

In 2011, on August 17, The Missanabie Cree First Nation and the Government of Ontario signed an agreement to provide the Nation with 15 square miles (39 km^{2}) of land as an initial allotment of a total 70 square miles (180 km^{2}) to which they are entitled under Treaty 9.
