= Ontario Highway 651 =

Ontario provincial highway

Highway 651

Route information
- Maintained by the Ministry of Transportation of Ontario
- Length: 52.8 km (32.8 mi)
- History: Established July 1, 1967; Extended April 30, 1969

Major junctions
- South end: Highway 101
- North end: CPR crossing in Missanabie

Location
- Country: Canada
- Province: Ontario
- Districts: Algoma

Highway system
- Ontario provincial highways; Current; Former; 400-series
← Highway 650	→ Highway 652

Secondary Highway 651, commonly referred to as Highway 651, is a provincially maintained highway in the Canadian province of Ontario. The highway is 52.8 kilometres (32.8 mi) in length, connecting Highway 101 east of Wawa with the remote community of Missanabie.

Highway 651 was established on the Centennial anniversary of Confederation, but did not connect to any other roads originally; access to the route was provided from Missanabie. It was extended south to connect with Highway 101 in 1969.

== Route description ==
Highway 651 is a 52.8-kilometre (32.8 mi) route which connects the community of Missanabie with Highway 101, also providing access to the western side of the Chapleau Crown Game Preserve. The southern terminus of the route is a junction with Highway 101, midway between Wawa and Chapleau. From there it proceeds north through an isolated region of northern Ontario, passing through the thick forests of the Canadian Shield. At the midpoint of the route, a short road branches off to the east, connecting with Dalton, a siding on the Canadian Pacific Railway's transcontinental line. North of Dalton, the railway — which acts as the southwestern boundary of the preserve — and highway travel parallel to one another. The route ends immediately east of Missinabie.

== History ==
Highway 651 was assumed by the Department of Highways (DHO) on the day of Canada's Centennial, July 1, 1967. At that point in time, Highway 101 had not yet been completed between Wawa and Chapleau, and so the route was connected to the rest of the province solely by rail. The isolated highway provided access between the community of Missanabie and the flag stop at Dalton, to the south. It was approximately half of the current length of the route.

Highway 651 was assumed by the DHO on the same day as the section of Highway 101 between Wawa and Chapleau opened, though it did not connect to it at first. A southward extension of Highway 651 to intersect it opened to traffic on April 30, 1969. The route has remained unchanged since that time.

== Major intersections ==
The following table lists the major junctions along Highway 651, as noted by the Ministry of Transportation of Ontario. The entire route is located in Algoma District.

Location	km	mi	Destinations	Notes
Unorganized Algoma District	0.0	0.0	Highway 101 – Timmins, Chapleau	
Unorganized Algoma District	27.9	17.3	Dalton Road – Dalton	
Missanabie	52.8	32.8	Renable Road	Missanabie CPR flag stop
1.000 mi = 1.609 km; 1.000 km = 0.621 mi
