= Ontario Highway 101 =

Ontario provincial highway

Highway 101
- Highway 101 highlighted in red

Route information
- Maintained by the Ministry of Transportation of Ontario
- Length: 473.3 km (294.1 mi)
- History: Established June 6, 1940 (as Hoyle–Shillington Highway); Numbered 1944; Completed January 1, 1967

Major junctions
- West end: Highway 17 near Wawa
- Highway 129 near Chapleau; Highway 144 near Timmins; Highway 655 near Timmins; Highway 11 in Matheson
- East end: R-388 at Ontario–Quebec border

Location
- Country: Canada
- Province: Ontario

Highway system
- Ontario provincial highways; Current; Former; 400-series
← Highway 94	→ Highway 102
Former provincial highways
← Highway 100

King's Highway 101, commonly referred to as Highway 101, is a provincially maintained highway in the Canadian province of Ontario. The 473.3-kilometre (294.1 mi) highway connects Highway 17 west of Wawa with Highway 11 in Matheson before continuing east to the Ontario–Quebec border where it becomes Route 388. The highway forms one of the only connections between the two routes of the Trans-Canada Highway between Nipigon and Temagami, and crosses some of the most remote regions of Northern Ontario. Major junctions are located with Highway 129 near Chapleau and Highway 144 southwest of Timmins, though the distance between these junctions is significant.

Highway 101 was first assumed in 1940, though it was not given a numerical designations until 1944. The route initially connected Timmins with Highway 11. In the 1950s and 1960s, it was extended east to the Quebec border and west to the newly opened Highway 17 over Lake Superior. The highway reached its maximum length in 1967, and remained unchanged until 1997, when a section through Timmins was transferred to the responsibility of that city.

== Route description ==
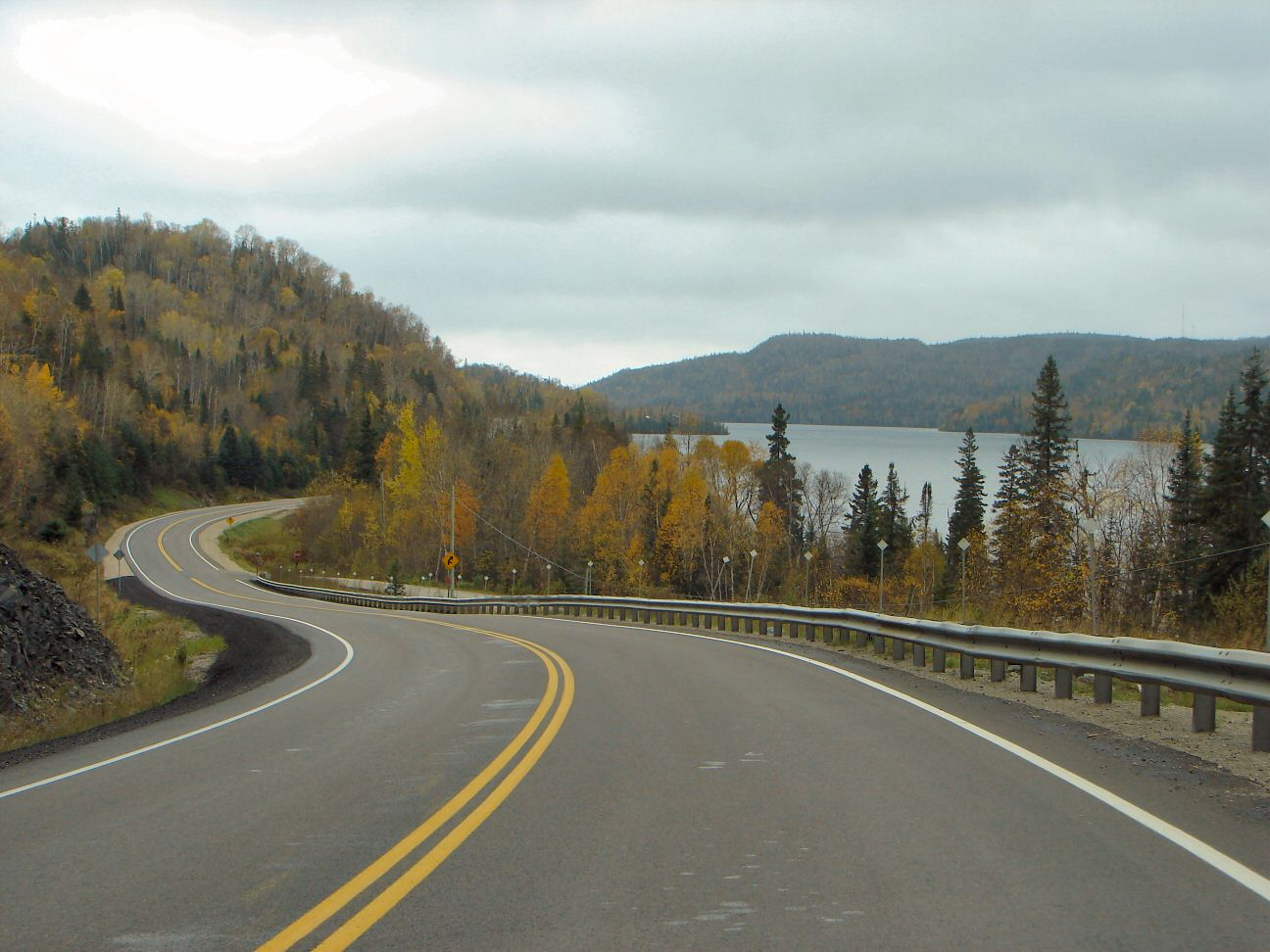
Highway 101 at Wawa Lake

Highway 101 begins in the west at Highway 17 near the town of Wawa and the village of Michipicoten, within Algoma District. Initially proceeding north, the route quickly turns eastward in Wawa and enters the barren expanses of the boreal forest, travelling through uninhabited wilderness for much of its journey across the Canadian Shield. Approximately 19.0 kilometres (11.8 mi) east of Wawa, the route encounters Highway 547, which travels north to Hawk Junction. From that junction, Highway 101 travels south for several kilometres before resuming its east–west orientation. Just east of The Shoals Provincial Park, the highway crosses the Laurentian Divide, the boundary between the Great Lakes and Arctic Ocean watersheds; a sign and a small picnic area mark the transition. Approximately midway between Wawa and Chapleau, the route enters Sudbury District, through which it continues most of the distance to Timmins.

Approaching Chapleau, Highway 101 encounters Highway 129, onto which it turns northward and becomes concurrent for 7.6 kilometres (4.7 mi). Prior to entering the town, Highway 101 branches eastward, passing north of Chapleau Airport and resuming its course through the wilderness. Midway between Chapleau and Timmins, the route passes the village of Foleyet. It briefly travels through Timiskaming District before entering Cochrane District, through which the remainder of the route passes. After entering the city of Timmins, and approximately 173 kilometres (107 mi) east of Highway 129, the route meets Highway 144, which travels south to Sudbury. Classified as a city, accelerated development has occurred progressively in the western portion of the municipality, with the urban portion located in the centre of the city. Through the urban portion, Highway 101 is not maintained as a provincial highway and is a local road. This discontinuity begins just east of Kamiskotia Road and continues for 21.3 kilometres (13.2 mi) to Gervais Street North.

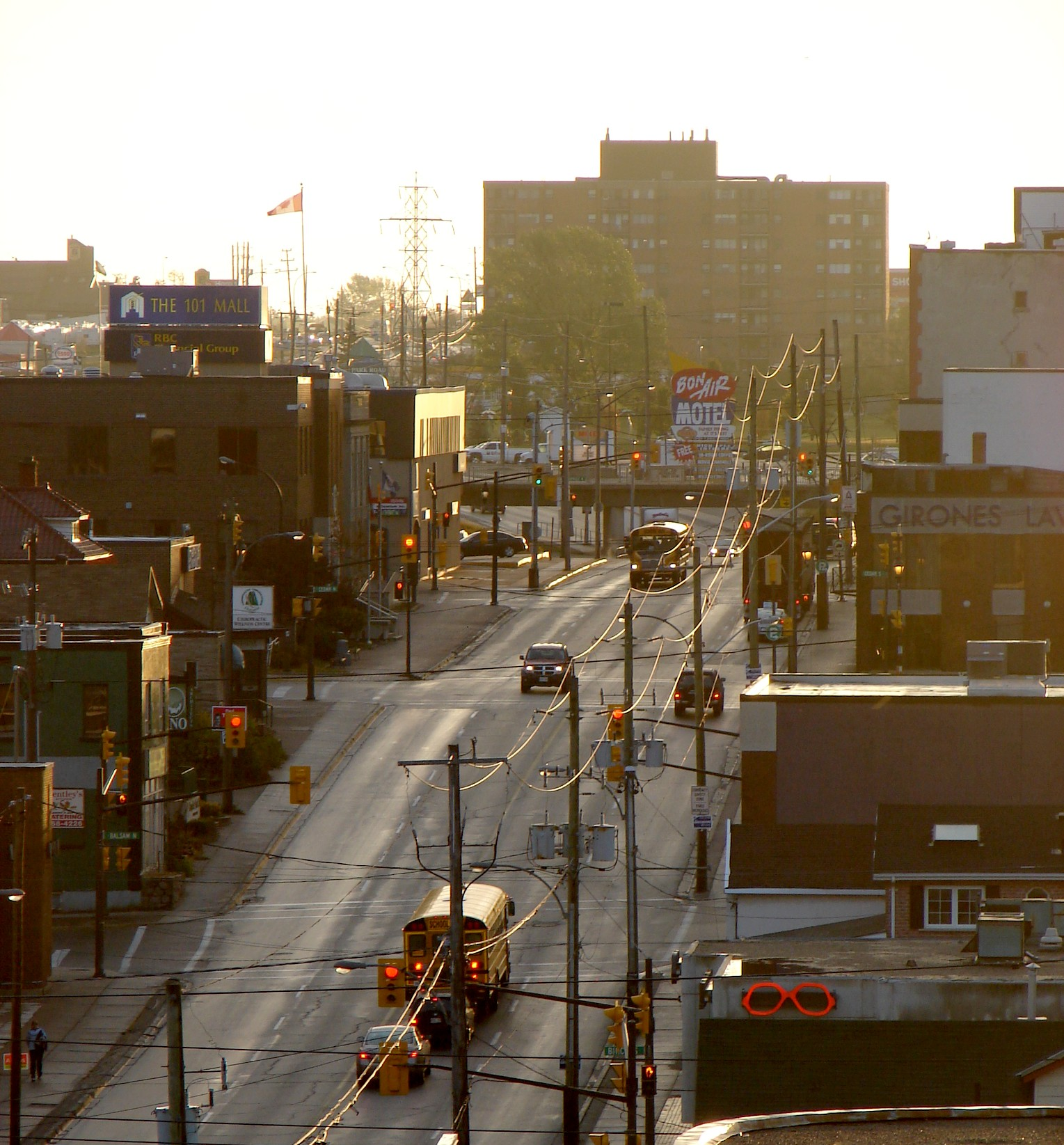
Highway 101 is known as Algonquin Boulevard in Downtown Timmins

East of Gervais Street North, Highway 101 travels northeast to Hoyle, passing beside several large open pit mines on the outskirts of Timmins. It then turn east and crosses the Frederick House River on the northern shores of Night Hawk Lake. The route passes through the only agricultural area along its journey, travelling straight for the remainder of the distance to Highway 11 west of Matheson. After a 6.4-kilometre (4.0 mi) concurrency with Highway 11, Highway 101 branches north into Matheson, where it crosses the Black River before curving east. Returning to wilderness, the route zig-zags towards the Ontario–Quebec border near Rouyn-Noranda, travelling several kilometres south of Lake Abitibi. The roadway continues eastward as Quebec Route 388 into the Abitibi-Témiscamingue region. With the exception of an undivided urban four lane section through Timmins, from Government Road in Mountjoy to Gervais Road South in Porcupine, the entire highway is two lanes wide.

== History ==
Highway 67 was the first provincial highway to provide access to Timmins from the Ferguson Highway (Highway 11). When it was designated in mid-1937, shortly after the merging of the Department of Northern Development into the Department of Highways (DHO), several other roads had been "built" in the area, but hardly improved beyond the clearing of trees. The DHO set forth to construct several new highways in the north. A concession road between Hoyle and Matheson already existed at this point, and over the next several years it was reconstructed to provincial standards. On June 26, 1940, the route was designated as a provincial highway. However, it was not numbered on official maps.

Construction of Highway 101 between Chapleau and Foleyet

During World War II, plans arose to connect Timmins with the Quebec border, and the route via Matheson was chosen as the most direct path. By the end of the war, the road between Hoyle and Matheson had been numbered as Highway 101 and extended eastward to Abitibi, ending at Garrison Creek. The route remained this way for several years.

The Trans-Canada Highway Act was passed in 1950 and provided the impetus to construct Highway 17 around Lake Superior, which was carried out over the course of the decade. This resulted in the planning of a new road to connect Highway 11 with Highway 17; it was decided that Highway 101 would be extended west as the new connector highway. In order to accommodate this future extension, the section of Highway 67 between Timmins and Hoyle was renumbered as Highway 101 in mid-1955. On September 1, 1955, the route was extended west of Timmins to Warren Lake. West of Warren Lake, Highway 616 and Highway 624 continued to the CNR stop in Foleyet; these would soon become part of Highway 101. Highway 101 was opened to the Quebec border in December 1958 with the completion of the final 11.6 km (7.2 mi) gap. In addition, work began on December 18 to clear the route of the Foleyet to Chapleau Resource Road. On April 1, 1960, Highway 616 and Highway 624 were renumbered as part of Highway 101, making the highway 247.2 km (153.6 mi) long; it now connected Foleyet to the Quebec border.

Typical Highway 101 between Wawa and Chapleau; the route is extremely remote and few services exist outside of communities.

In 1963, several new sections of Highway 101 were opened. On May 16, the majority of the new Chapleau–Foleyet road was designated as Highway 101, with the exception of a 13.4 km (8.3 mi) bypass of Foleyet and the old route of Highway 624 that opened on December 19. In addition, a new 40.2 km (25.0 mi) road west of Chapleau was assumed in December, terminating at the Grazing River near the present entrance to The Shoals Provincial Park.

Work also progressed from the west, near Wawa. Prior to the opening of Highway 17 and Highway 101, a road connected the port at Michipicoten with Wawa. Highway 101 follows a portion of this route, but south of the Highway 17 junction the old road is now known as Pinewood Drive. In October 1965, a 31.5 km (19.6 mi) road was designated as Highway 101, travelling as far east as the Michipicoten River, The final section, a gap between the Michipicoten River bridge and the Grazing River, opened to traffic on January 1, 1967, completing the link between Wawa and Timmins.

A 21.3-kilometre (13.2 mi) segment of Highway 101 was transferred to the City of Timmins on April 1, 1997 as part of a province-wide downloading program. This portion is now locally maintained and is known as Riverside Drive in the Mountjoy area, Algonquin Boulevard downtown, Schumacher Drive in Schumacher, Harold Avenue in South Porcupine and King Street in Porcupine. The discontinuous section begins 200 metres (660 ft) east of Kamiskotia Road near Mountjoy and continues to Gervais Street North in Porcupine, encompassing a majority of the portion within urban Timmins.

== Major intersections ==
The following table lists the major junctions along Highway 101, as noted by the Ministry of Transportation of Ontario.

Division	Location	km	mi	Destinations	Notes
Algoma	Wawa	0.0	0.0	Highway 17 / TCH – Sault Ste. Marie, White River	
Algoma	Wawa	2.0	1.2	Chris Simon Drive	Beginning of Wawa Connecting Link agreement
Algoma	Wawa	3.3	2.1	Gladstone Avenue	End of Wawa Connecting Link agreement
Algoma	Unorganized North Algoma	21.3	13.2	Highway 547 – Hawk Junction	
Algoma	Unorganized North Algoma	64.6	40.1	Highway 651 north – Missanabie	
Sudbury	Unorganized North Sudbury	127.8	79.4	Highway 129 south – Thessalon	West end of Highway 129 concurrency
Sudbury	Chapleau 74A	135.4	84.1	Highway 129 north – Chapleau	East end of Highway 129 concurrency
Sudbury	Unorganized North Sudbury	229.3	142.5	Highway 7072 (Young Street) – Foleyet	
Timmins		308.0	191.4	Highway 144 south – Sudbury	
Timmins		323.0	200.7	Kamiskotia Road	Formerly Highway 576
Timmins		323.2	200.8		Beginning of decommissioned segment through Timmins
Timmins		Highway 101 is discontinuous for 21.3 km (13.2 mi) through downtown Timmins			
Timmins		344.5	214.1	Gervais Street North	End of decommissioned segment through Timmins
Timmins		354.5	220.3	Frederick House Lake Road	Formerly Highway 610
Cochrane	Black River-Matheson	382.7	237.8	Highway 577 north	
Cochrane	Black River-Matheson	392.4	243.8	Highway 11 north / TCH – Cochrane	West end of Highway 11 concurrency
Cochrane	Black River-Matheson	398.8	247.8	Highway 11 south / TCH – North Bay	East end of Highway 11 concurrency; beginning of Matheson Connecting Link agreement
Cochrane	Black River-Matheson	399.5	248.2	Abitibi River crossing	End of Matheson Connecting Link agreement
Cochrane	Black River-Matheson	414.3	257.4	Highway 572 south – Holtyre, Ramore	
Cochrane	Black River-Matheson	450.6	280.0	Highway 672 south – Kirkland Lake	
Cochrane	Black River-Matheson	473.3	294.1	R-388 east – La Sarre	Continuation into Quebec
1.000 mi = 1.609 km; 1.000 km = 0.621 mi: Closed/former; Concurrency terminus; Route transition
