= South Greenhill River =

- Location of the mouth of the South Greenhill River in Ontario

Location
- Country: Canada
- Province: Ontario
- Region: Northeastern Ontario
- Districts: Algoma; Sudbury

Physical characteristics
- Source
  - location: Winget Township, Algoma District
  - coordinates: 48°28′15″N 83°53′06″W
  - elevation: 409 m (1,342 ft)
- Mouth: Greenhill River
  - location: Nebotik Township, Algoma District
  - coordinates: 48°33′58″N 83°40′23″W
  - elevation: 315 m (1,033 ft)

Basin features
- River system: James Bay drainage basin

The South Greenhill River is a river in Algoma District and Sudbury District in northeastern Ontario, Canada. It is in the James Bay drainage basin, and is a right tributary of the Greenhill River.

== Course ==
The river begins on open ground in geographic Winget Township, Algoma District, in part of the South Greenhill Lake Sand Delta Conservation Reserve. It heads southwest into geographic Rennie Township, Sudbury District and into South Greenhill Lake. The lake takes the river back northeast into Winget Township and then into geographic Amik Township, where it then leaves the conservation reserve. The river heads northeast, takes in the right tributary Mang Creek, and passes northeast through the northwest corner of geographic Abigo Township. The river continues northeast into geographic Nebotik Township, and reaches its mouth at the Greenhill River. The Greenhill River flows via the Missinaibi River and the Moose River to James Bay.

== Drainage basin ==
The entire drainage basin (watershed) is within Algoma District, with the exception of short portion of the river as it enters South Greenhill Lake, the southwest tip of that lake, and the small watershed of a creek entering the southwest tip of South Greenhill Lake, that is in Sudbury District.

== Natural history ==
The South Greenhill Lake Sand Delta Conservation Reserve has mammals including the pine marten and beaver, and bird species such as the red-tailed hawk.

== Recreation ==
There is an outpost camp on the south end of South Greenhill Lake leased for use as a remote fishing and wildlife observation tourism location."

== Tributaries ==
- Mang Creek (right)

== Sources ==
- Map 14 (PDF) (Map). 1 : 1,600,000. Official road map of Ontario. Ministry of Transportation of Ontario. 2010-01-01.
- Restructured municipalities - Ontario map #3 (Map). Restructuring Maps of Ontario. Ontario Ministry of Municipal Affairs and Housing. 2006.
