= Peterbell =

- Dispersed rural community
- Etymology: Peter Warren Bell, Hudson's Bay Company employee
- Location in Ontario
- Coordinates: 48°36′03″N 83°20′43″W
- Country: Canada
- Province: Ontario
- District: Algoma
- Census subdiv.: Unorg. North Algoma
- Founded: 1913
- Elevation: 317 m (1,040 ft)
- Time zone: UTC-5 (Eastern Time Zone)
  - Summer (DST): UTC-4 (Eastern Time Zone)
- Postal Code FSA: P0M

Peterbell is an unincorporated place and dispersed rural community in geographic Coderre Township, in the Unorganized North part of Algoma District in northeastern Ontario, Canada. It is on the Canadian National Railway transcontinental railway main line between the railway points of Argolis to the west and Dunrankin to the east, has a passing track, and is passed but not served by Via Rail transcontinental Canadian trains.

The place is on the Missinaibi River, a tributary of the Moose River. It is named for Peter Warren Bell, who was in charge of the Hudson's Bay Company Superior District from 1866 to 1895.

== History ==
Peterbell is part of a section of what was originally the Canadian Northern Railway that was under construction from 1912 to 1913.

In 1917, the Hudson's Bay Company (HBC) established a fur trade post along the railway and served as an outpost for the Missanabie HBC post. At the same time, the New Brunswick House post on Missinaibi Lake was closed and the Peterbell post took over its operations. It became a full post before 1933, but closed on September 30, 1957.
