= Argolis, Ontario =

Argolis
- Railway point
- Etymology: Named for the Greek region of Argolis
- Location in Ontario
- Coordinates: 48°41′18″N 83°26′55″W
- Country: Canada
- Province: Ontario
- District: Algoma
- Geographic township: Hayward
- Elevation: 310 m (1,020 ft)
- Time zone: UTC-5 (Eastern Time Zone)
  - Summer (DST): UTC-4 (Eastern Time Zone)
- Postal Code FSA: P0M

Argolis is an unincorporated place and railway point in geographic Hayward Township, in the Unorganized North part of Algoma District in northeastern Ontario, Canada. It is on the Canadian National Railway transcontinental railway main line between the railway points of Fire River to the west and Peterbell to the east, has a passing track, and is passed but not served by Via Rail transcontinental Canadian trains. Argolis is on an unnamed right tributary of the Greenhill River, itself a tributary of the Missinaibi River, and is named for the Greek region of Argolis.

== History ==
Argolis is part of a section of what was originally the Canadian Northern Railway that was under construction from 1912 to 1913.
