= Greenhill River =

- Location of the mouth of the Greenhill River in Ontario

Location
- Country: Canada
- Province: Ontario
- Region: Northeastern Ontario
- District: Algoma

Physical characteristics
- Source: Greenhill Lake
  - location: Makawa Township
  - coordinates: 48°35′11″N 83°52′05″W
  - elevation: 396 m (1,299 ft)
- Mouth: Missinaibi River
  - location: Hayward Township
  - coordinates: 48°43′17″N 83°27′08″W
  - elevation: 286 m (938 ft)

Basin features
- River system: James Bay drainage basin
- Tributaries
  - right: South Greenhill River

The Greenhill River is a river in Algoma District in northeastern Ontario, Canada. It is in the James Bay drainage basin, and is a left tributary of the Missinaibi River.

== Course ==
The river begins at Greenhill Lake in geographic Makawa Township and flows north, curving around the west side of the lake to eventually head southeast to Amik Lake. It continues south east then northeast through the north central part of geographic Amik Township, then enters geographic Nebotik Township at the southwest corner. The river continues northeast, then turns east and takes in the right tributary South Greenhill River. It continues east, enters geographic Conking Township, turns northeast, enters geographic Hayward Township, flows under the Canadian National Railway transcontinental railway main line between the railway points of Fire River to the west and Argolis to the east, a section of track travelled on by Via Rail transcontinental Canadian passenger trains, and reaches its mouth at the Missinaibi River. The Missinaibi River flows via the Moose River to James Bay.

The entire course of the river, except for the short portion downstream (to the north) of the CN mainline, is within the Chapleau Crown Game Preserve. That remaining short portion is within Missinaibi Provincial Park.

== Tributaries ==
- South Greenhill River (right)
- Winjiget Creek (right)
- Timia Creek (right)

== Sources ==
- Map 14 (PDF) (Map). 1 : 1,600,000. Official road map of Ontario. Ministry of Transportation of Ontario. 2010-01-01.
- Restructured municipalities - Ontario map #3 (Map). Restructuring Maps of Ontario. Ontario Ministry of Municipal Affairs and Housing. 2006. Archived from the original on 2014-04-10.
