= Michipicoten River =

River in Canada

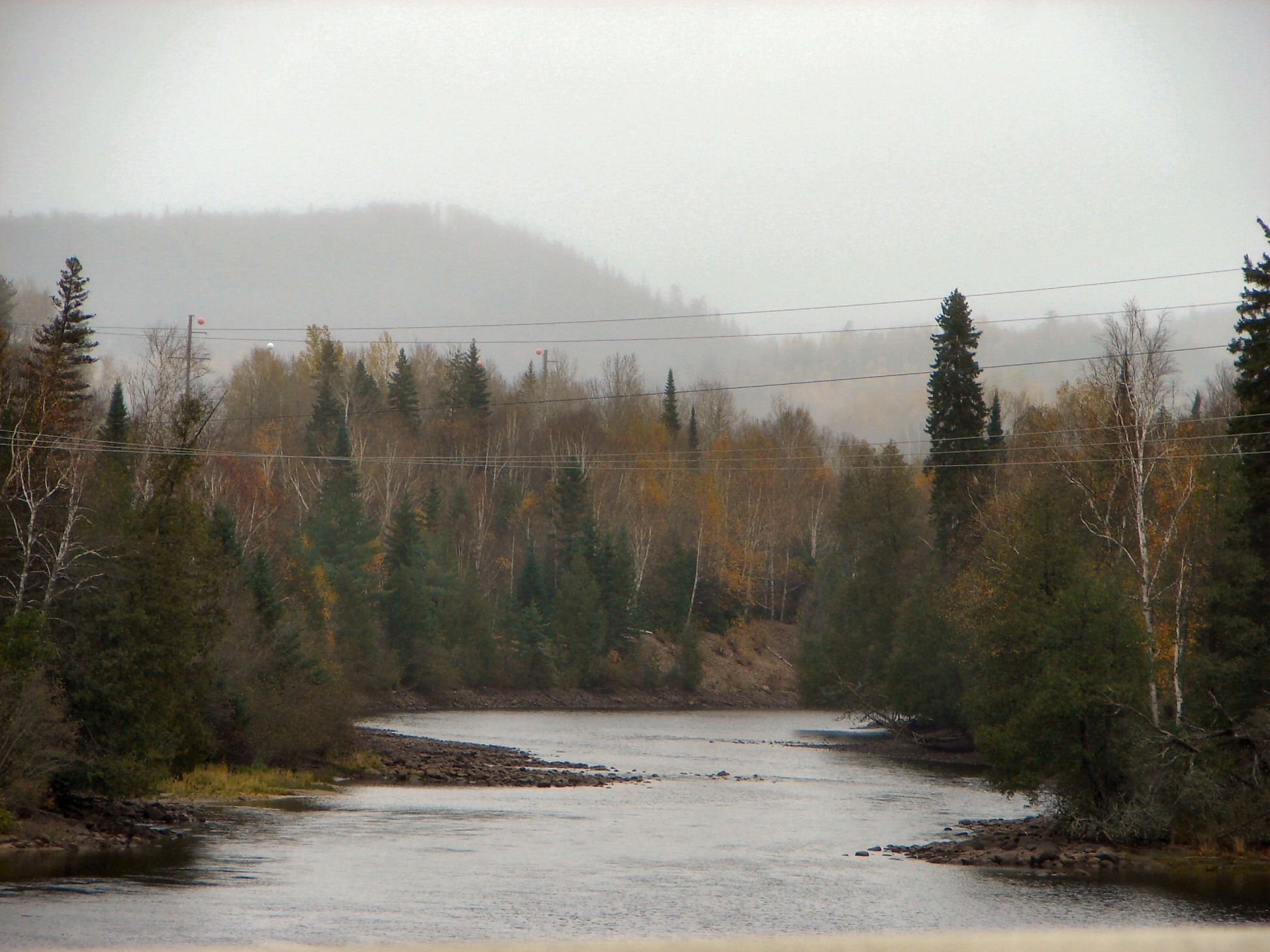
- Michipicoten River as seen from Highway 101

Location
- Country: Canada
- Province: Ontario
- Region: Algoma District

Physical characteristics
- Source: Dog Lake
  - location: 15 km SW of Missanabie, Ontario
  - coordinates: 48°13′55″N 84°13′15″W
  - elevation: 330 m (1,080 ft)
- Mouth: Michipicoten Bay of Lake Superior
  - location: Michipicoten, Ontario
  - coordinates: 47°56′00″N 84°51′00″W
  - elevation: 183 m (600 ft)
- Length: 81 km (50 mi)
- Basin size: 5,200 km^{2} (2,000 sq mi)

The Michipicoten River (/mɪtʃɪpɪˈkɒtən/) is a river in Algoma District of northern Ontario, Canada, which flows from Dog Lake and joins with the Magpie River to empty into Michipicoten Bay on Lake Superior near the town of Wawa. This river is 113 km (70 mi) in length (including Lochalsh River to the outlet of Wabatongushi Lake) and drains an area of about 5,200 km^{2} (2,000 sq mi).

The river's name derives from the Ojibwe Mishipikwadina, meaning "big bluffs," and refers to the large hills located near the river's mouth.

From the outlet of Dog Lake, the Michipicoten River flows south through a series of large lakes: Manitowik and Whitefish. Then it flows mostly west to Lake Superior. There are four hydroelectric generating stations on this last section of the river (operated by Brookfield Power Inc.), and at its mouth is the Michipicoten Provincial Park that was the site of a trading post.

== History ==
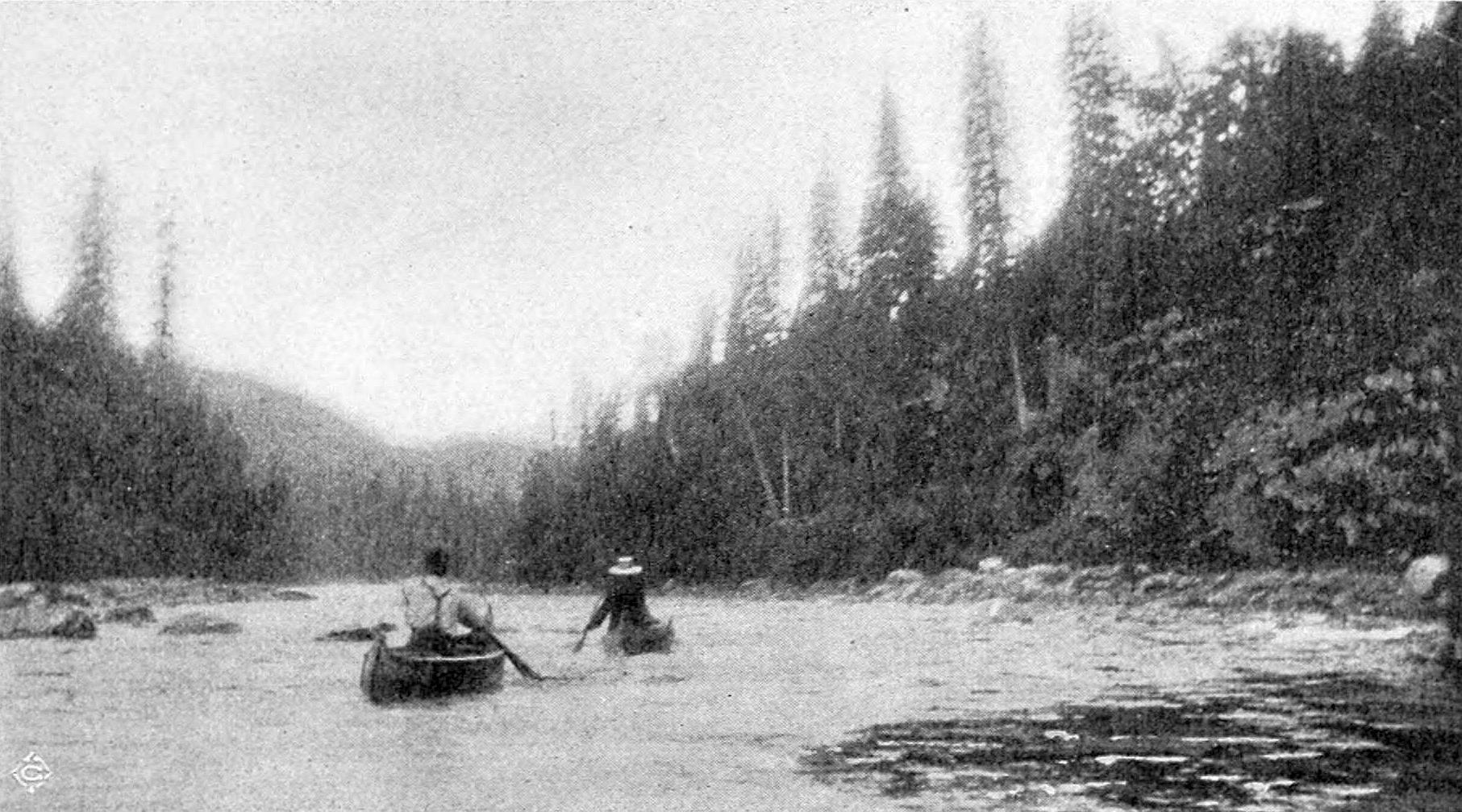
Canoeing above Michipicoten High Falls, 1897.

A number of prehistoric sites on the Michipicoten River, as well as in the surrounding valley, have been identified by archaeologists. Of these remains, the most extensive are from the Late Woodland period, though some go as far back as the Archaic period. Artifacts, such as ceramics, have been linked to the Blackduck and Laurel traditions. The most prominent sites cluster around the mouth of the river or are within several miles upriver from the mouth.

The French explorer and cartographer Samuel de Champlain included the Michipicoten River in a map of North America as early as 1632. Later, in the days of the fur trade, this river provided access to James Bay by way of the Missinaibi and Moose rivers. Pierre-Esprit Radisson and Médard des Groseilliers are believed to be the first non-natives to travel this route. A French fur trading post was built at the river's mouth in the early 18th century, at a site sometimes called "Fort Michipicoten". Later, after the British triumph in the French and Indian War, the post was abandoned. It was eventually reopened later in the 18th century under the British, and the Hudson's Bay Company and North West Company both opened competing trading posts at the river mouth, with the former building trading posts along the river's route in the 1770s. In 1781, Philip Turnor, the HBC's first full-time surveyor, performed a detailed survey of the river, followed by many upgrades to the portages. The two companies merged in 1821, and the Moose/Missinaibi/Michipicoten route became the established supply route for HBC's Lake Superior District, orienting the fur trade up to Hudson Bay rather than Montreal.

In the 1880s, during the construction of the Canadian Pacific Railway (CPR), construction materials were landed at the mouth of the river, as well as at Michipicoten Harbour. The materials were then moved upriver mostly on land, though partially using steamboats on Wawa Lake and Lake Manitowick. The routing of the Canadian Pacific mainline (the nearby section of which is the CP White River Subdivision) was oriented to parallel the Great Lakes system and ran orthogonal to the river, but fell well inland and diminished the importance of the Michipicoten River trading post, while stimulating business elsewhere, for example at Missanabie. Settlements around the river, such as Wawa, became boom towns due to a short-lived gold rush in the area around the turn of the 20th century. The end of the gold rush meant that some plans, such as the one to develop a "Michipicoten City" in the area of the old trading post, failed to transform the area, and the trading post was finally abandoned in 1904. Its site is now part of Michipicoten Provincial Park.

The river once flowed over a 27 m (89 ft) succession of cascades known as Michipicoten High Falls. In 1904, construction began on a dam and hydroelectric power plant, intended to provide power to mines in the area such as the Helen Mine. The dam was completed in 1907, destroying the falls with the filling of a lake reservoir behind it. The power plant was later upgraded in 1926 in anticipation of a revived gold mining industry. This second gold mining boom drew population and development toward the new gold mining towns, which were referred to collectively as Gold Park, and away from existing riverside settlements.

== Tributaries ==
View of Whitefish Lake, an impoundment along the Michipicoten River.

- Magpie River
- Anjigami River
- Shikwamkwa River
  - Jackpine River
- Hawk River
- Dog Lake
  - Murray Creek
  - Dog River
  - Lochalsh River
    - Wabatongushi Lake

== See also ==
- List of rivers of Ontario
