= Wawa Lake =

Lake in Ontario, Canada

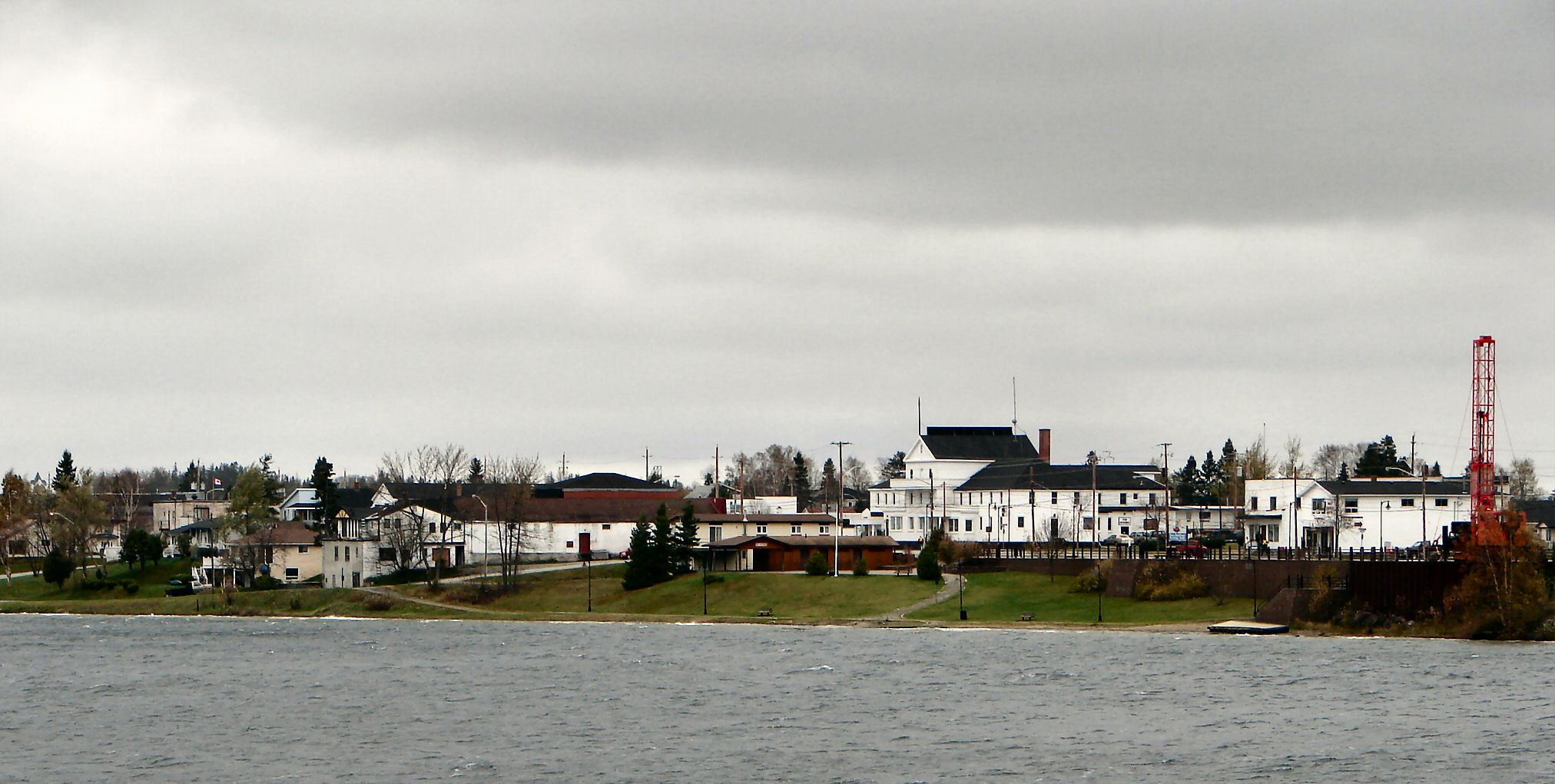
- Wawa as seen across Wawa Lake

- Location within Ontario
- Location: Ontario
- Coordinates: 48°0′46″N 84°43′18″W
- Primary outflows: Wawa Creek
- Basin countries: Canada

Wawa Lake is a lake located in northeastern Ontario, Canada, in Algoma District, near the town of Wawa.

Its original name was Wawungonk, meaning "place of clear water" or "hills covered in clear snow".

== See also ==
- List of lakes in Ontario
