= Wawa, Ontario =

Wawa
- Municipality (single-tier)
- Municipality of Wawa
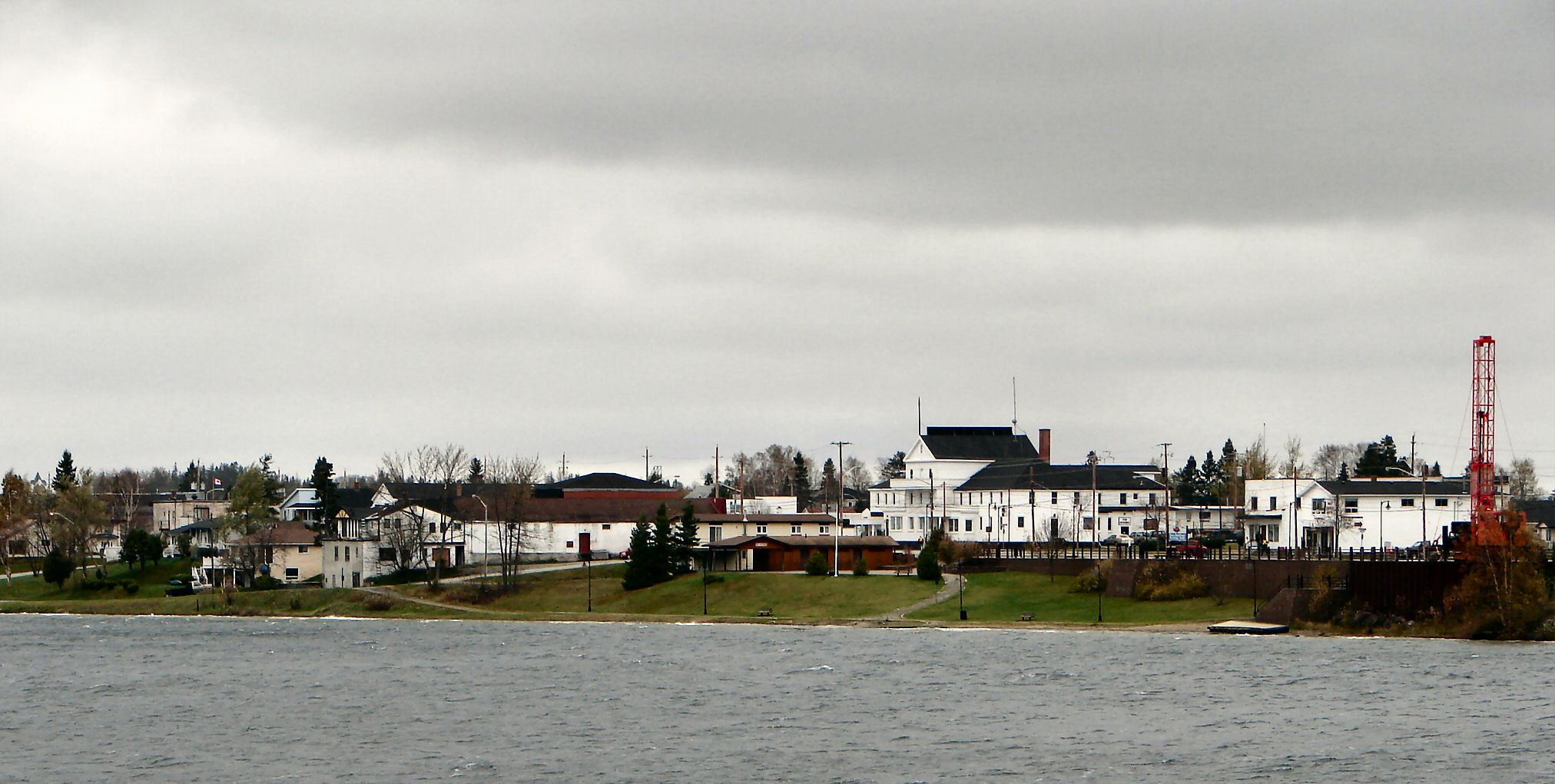
- Wawa as seen across Wawa Lake

- Location within Ontario
- Coordinates: 47°59′35″N 84°46′25″W
- Country: Canada
- Province: Ontario
- District: Algoma
- Established: 1899

Government
  - Mayor: Melanie Pilon
  - Fed. riding: Sault Ste. Marie—Algoma
  - Prov. riding: Algoma—Manitoulin

Area
  - Land: 411.89 km^{2} (159.03 sq mi)
- Elevation: 287 m (942 ft)

Population (2021)
  - Total: 2,705
  - Density: 6.6/km^{2} (17/sq mi)
- Time zone: UTC-5 (Eastern Standard Time (EST))
  - Summer (DST): UTC-4 (Eastern Daylight Time (EDT))
- Postal Code: P0S 1K0
- Area code(s): 705
- Website: www.wawa.cc

Wawa is a township in the Canadian province of Ontario in the Algoma District. Formerly known as the Township of Michipicoten, named after a nearby river of that name, the township was officially renamed in 2007 for its largest and best-known community of Wawa, located on the western shores of Wawa Lake. The lake's original name was Wawungonk, meaning "place of clear water" or "hills covered in clear snow".

This area was first developed for fur trading. In the late 19th century, both gold and iron ore were found and mined, leading to the region's rise as the steel industry developed in Sault Ste. Marie, Ontario. From 1900 to 1918 the Helen Mine had the highest production of iron ore of any mine in Canada.

== History ==
=== Fur trade days ===
Fort Michipicoten was constructed at the mouth of the Michipicoten River. It was at the junction of the main fur trade route from Montreal westward and the route to James Bay via the Missinaibi River.

French explorers reached the area by the mid 17th century, and a post was built early in the next century. The site was on the south bank of the river, opposite the mouth of the Magpie River. By 1729, it was an outpost of Fort Kaministiquia under command of Vérendrye's Postes du Nord. When the British conquered Canada in 1763, this post was abandoned.

Four years later, it was re-opened on the same site by fur traders Alexander Henry the elder and Jean Baptiste Cadotte. The route from James Bay was explored by Edward Jarvis (1775) and Philip Turnor (1781). In 1783, it was taken over by the North West Company, based in Montreal. In 1797, the Hudson's Bay Company built a rival post on the north bank.

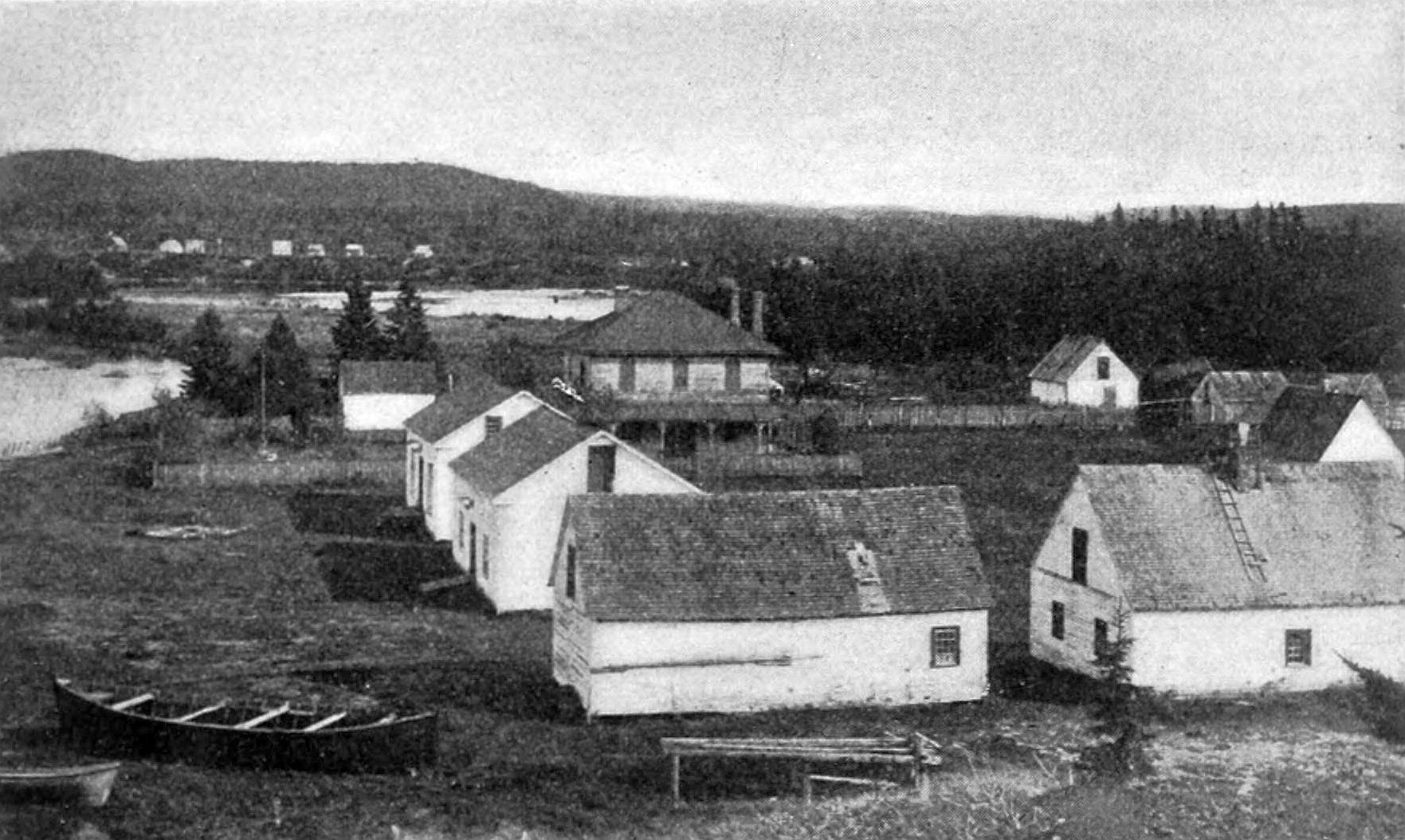
Michipicoten, 1897

With the union of the two companies in 1821, the Lake Superior trade was diverted from Montreal to Hudson Bay via Michipicoten. From 1827, the fort was the headquarters of the Superior Division, and several annual meetings were held here. It was a centre for fishing, boatbuilding and small-scale manufacture and repair. It also served as a base for missionaries and surveyors. This lasted until 1863, when the arrival of steamboats and railways made it unnecessary. It was closed in 1904 and gradually taken apart. In 1982, the site became the Michipicoten Provincial Park.

=== Modern ===
Mining attempts began as early as the late 1660s.

William Teddy discovered gold on Wawa Lake in 1897. The population of Wawa village quickly grew with 1,700 claims staked in 1898. However, most gold production stopped by 1906. Beginning in 1914 with the completion of the Algoma Central Railway, gold production commenced again from 22 prospects.

In 1898, the town site at what is now called "the Mission" was registered as "Michipicoten City." In 1899, Wawa was surveyed and plotted as a town and registered as Wawa City. In the latter half of the 1950s, the town's name was temporarily changed to Jamestown in honour of Sir James Hamet Dunn, but it was later returned to Wawa at the request of the community's residents.

Gold production had slowed by 1906, but as mining technology improved, additional amounts began to be extracted from the area. Gold mining in the Wawa area prospered and receded several times in the 20th century, and it continues today. Notable producers include the Grace Mine (1902–1944), which produced 15,191 ounces, the Minto Mine (1929–1942), which produced 37,678 ounces, the Parkhill Mine (1902–1944), which produced 54,301 ounces, and the Renabie Mine (1920–1991), which produced 1.1 million ounces.

Iron ore extraction has also been an important industry in the area. The search for gold during the Michipicoten boom led to the unexpected discovery in 1897 of iron ore. Francis Hector Clergue, an American entrepreneur, immediately recognized the iron ore for its potential; he established a steel company at Sault Ste. Marie. Wawa was served by the Algoma Central Railway to ship ore for processing.

The first supply of ore extracted from the Helen Mine was shipped to Midland, Ontario, in July 1900; this was the "first boat shipment of Canadian iron ore to a Canadian port." The mine produced high-grade iron ore until 1903, when operations shut down due to financial difficulties encountered by Clergue and his company. By 1904, the mine had returned to full production capabilities and was mining one thousand tons of hematite ore a day. From 1900 to 1918, the Helen Mine had the largest production of any iron mine in Canada.

In 1909, a second hematite ore deposit was uncovered near the Magpie River, twelve miles north of the Helen Mine. The Algoma Steel Corporation, organized between 1904 and 1909 in Sault Ste. Marie, bought up the claims and operated both the Magpie and Helen mines for the next decade. The Helen Mine continued ore production until 1918, when the company felt the reserve of hematite ore was finally depleted. The same fate followed the Magpie Mine in 1921. The Census of Canada records that the population of the Michipicoten region in 1921 experienced a drop from 1,001 in 1911 to 101 just ten years later.

It was not until 1937, with the threat of war in Europe and the emergence of a profitable market for Canadian iron ore, that the Helen Mine was reopened. A sintering plant was constructed on the northern bank of the Magpie River, two miles west of the mine. It was used to treat the siderite ore before it was shipped to the blast furnaces at Algoma Steel in Sault Ste. Marie. The plant became the centre for a small community called Sinterville, composed of workers and their families.

The Helen Mine remained an open pit operation until 1950, from which point on all production came from underground mining. In 1960, the new George W. MacLeod Mine went into production adjacent to the Helen Mine. The ore was transported on an aerial tramline that consisted of over 280 steel three-ton buckets traveling underground and then emerging three-quarters of a mile west of the 2,066-foot vertical MacLeod Shaft. The tramline continued the remaining two miles to the sinter plant on overhead cables. This system was replaced in 1979 by the latest in underground mining technology, the highest-lift single-drive conveyor in the world.

During the summer of 1971, Wawa hosted an archaeological field camp known as the Wawa Drop-In Project or the Big Dig, for young hitchhikers traveling along Highway 17. The project was directed by Professor K.C.A. Dawson and supported by the federal government as part of its youth employment program. The results of this fieldwork at several important sites were never published. The records are currently held by the Canadian Museum of Civilization in Ottawa.

Throughout the 1990s, Wawa and the Algoma Ore Division continued to be challenged by international market problems that plagued both the gold and iron mining industries. In December 1997, Algoma Steel announced that it could no longer support the high cost of extracting low-grade iron at Algoma Ore Division. Although Wawa's mountain of iron ore had more to give, operations were shut down in June 1998, one hundred years after iron was first discovered in this remote corner of northern Algoma.

Wawa suffered a population decline after the closures of Helen Mine and the sinter plant. Its main industries have been forestry and tourism. In recent years, diamond prospecting and proposals to create a trap rock mine on the shore of Lake Superior have been developed; however, no mining activities of any kind have yet been established.

In October 2007 Weyerhauser, which operated an oriented strandboard mill 30 kilometres east of the town, announced an indefinite shutdown of its mill. The final production shift ran at the end of December 2007. Given low demand for wood products, the likelihood of the mill reopening was marginal at best. Since the shutdown, Wawa's economy has suffered a near complete collapse, as the closure resulted in over 135 lost jobs, and more residents left the area. This has had a spinoff effect on other businesses and on the town's population. It peaked at close to 5,600 in the 1990s but has since dropped to under 3,000, according to the 2011 Canadian census.

The collapse of the forestry industry in the first decade of the 2000s also adversely affected the neighbouring communities of Dubreuilville and White River. Wawa, the area's largest settlement, has faced difficulties in attracting new industry to the community and region.

== Geography ==
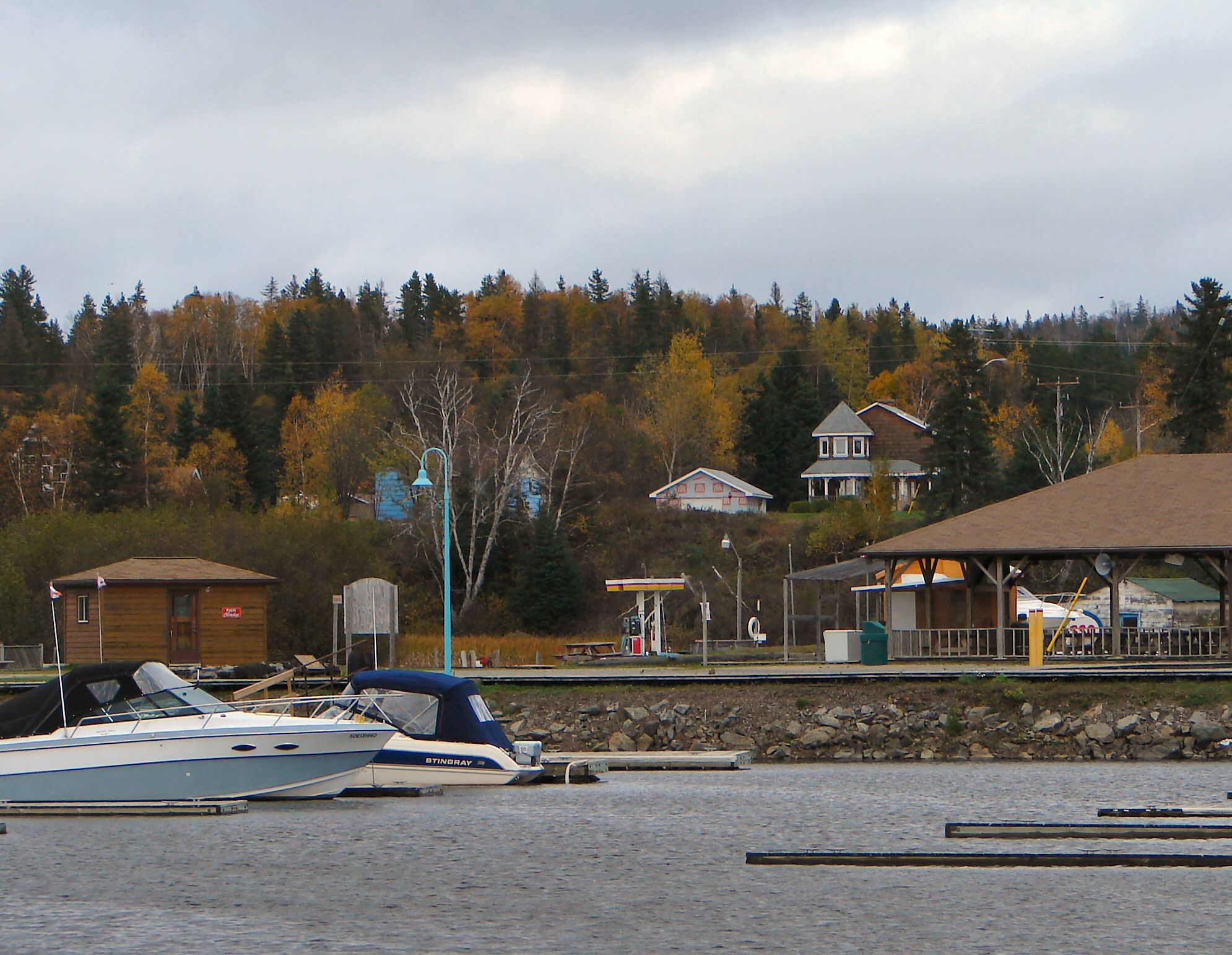
Community of Michipicoten River

The township includes the main population centre of Wawa, as well as the smaller communities of Michipicoten (formerly known as Michipicoten Harbour, 47°57′43″N 84°54′00″W) and Michipicoten River (47°56′09″N 84°49′30″W), which are small coastal settlements on the shore of Lake Superior. The name "Michipicoten" is derived from the Ojibwe term for the river, meaning "place of high bluffs".

=== Climate ===
Wawa has a humid continental climate (Köppen climate classification Dfb) that is significantly moderated by Lake Superior. Winters are cold and snowy with a January high of −7.7 °C (18.1 °F) and a low of −19.6 °C (−3.3 °F) and temperatures below −20 °C (−4.0 °F) occur 43 days per year. Snowfall totals are heavy, averaging over 313.9 centimetres (124 in) due to lake effect snow from Lake Superior as cold air from the northwest passes over the warmer lake. Summers are cool and mild due to cool, dry air masses from the northwest and the cooling of warm air from the south as it passes Lake Superior. As a result, temperatures above 30 °C (86.0 °F) are rare. August is the warmest month with a high of 20.9 °C (69.6 °F) and a low of 10.1 °C (50.2 °F), showing a slight seasonal lag. The average annual precipitation is 967.2 millimetres (38 in), which is relatively evenly distributed throughout the year though the months of July to October see a peak in precipitation.

Climate data for Wawa Airport (1991−2020 normals, extremes 1919–present)
| Month | Jan | Feb | Mar | Apr | May | Jun | Jul | Aug | Sep | Oct | Nov | Dec | Year |
|---|---|---|---|---|---|---|---|---|---|---|---|---|---|
| Record high humidex | 6.7 | 12.3 | 20.1 | 30.6 | 36.4 | 38.3 | 37.1 | 39.2 | 34.9 | 27.8 | 22.6 | 18.5 | 39.2 |
| Record high °C (°F) | 7.0 (44.6) | 11.5 (52.7) | 23.1 (73.6) | 30.3 (86.5) | 31.4 (88.5) | 35.0 (95.0) | 38.3 (100.9) | 34.1 (93.4) | 31.1 (88.0) | 28.0 (82.4) | 19.9 (67.8) | 15.5 (59.9) | 38.3 (100.9) |
| Mean daily maximum °C (°F) | −7.7 (18.1) | −5.9 (21.4) | −0.1 (31.8) | 6.9 (44.4) | 14.6 (58.3) | 19.6 (67.3) | 20.8 (69.4) | 20.9 (69.6) | 16.9 (62.4) | 9.7 (49.5) | 2.4 (36.3) | −4.0 (24.8) | 7.8 (46.0) |
| Daily mean °C (°F) | −13.7 (7.3) | −12.1 (10.2) | −6.3 (20.7) | 1.2 (34.2) | 8.2 (46.8) | 13.2 (55.8) | 15.2 (59.4) | 15.5 (59.9) | 11.6 (52.9) | 5.3 (41.5) | −1.5 (29.3) | −8.7 (16.3) | 2.3 (36.1) |
| Mean daily minimum °C (°F) | −19.6 (−3.3) | −18.3 (−0.9) | −12.5 (9.5) | −4.6 (23.7) | 1.7 (35.1) | 6.8 (44.2) | 9.6 (49.3) | 10.1 (50.2) | 6.3 (43.3) | 0.8 (33.4) | −5.3 (22.5) | −13.5 (7.7) | −3.2 (26.2) |
| Record low °C (°F) | −47.2 (−53.0) | −50.0 (−58.0) | −40.0 (−40.0) | −28.9 (−20.0) | −12.8 (9.0) | −3.9 (25.0) | 0.0 (32.0) | −2.2 (28.0) | −6.7 (19.9) | −18.9 (−2.0) | −33.3 (−27.9) | −45.6 (−50.1) | −50.0 (−58.0) |
| Record low wind chill | −51.1 | −45.5 | −43.6 | −30.2 | −15.1 | −3.4 | 0.0 | 0.0 | −6.9 | −13.7 | −32.4 | −46.1 | −51.1 |
| Average precipitation mm (inches) | 58.2 (2.29) | 44.1 (1.74) | 53.0 (2.09) | 76.0 (2.99) | 85.9 (3.38) | 80.3 (3.16) | 92.2 (3.63) | 90.5 (3.56) | 125.1 (4.93) | 115.7 (4.56) | 79.2 (3.12) | 67.2 (2.65) | 967.2 (38.08) |
| Average rainfall mm (inches) | 3.9 (0.15) | 4.8 (0.19) | 18.9 (0.74) | 50.5 (1.99) | 81.9 (3.22) | 80.3 (3.16) | 92.2 (3.63) | 90.5 (3.56) | 124.8 (4.91) | 106.4 (4.19) | 43.4 (1.71) | 12.5 (0.49) | 709.8 (27.94) |
| Average snowfall cm (inches) | 74.1 (29.2) | 54.9 (21.6) | 38.6 (15.2) | 22.5 (8.9) | 4.0 (1.6) | 0.0 (0.0) | 0.0 (0.0) | 0.0 (0.0) | 0.3 (0.1) | 8.1 (3.2) | 39.3 (15.5) | 72.2 (28.4) | 313.9 (123.6) |
| Average precipitation days (≥ 0.2 mm) | 17.3 | 13.3 | 11.5 | 10.9 | 12.8 | 12.5 | 13.6 | 12.4 | 14.8 | 15.4 | 16.0 | 16.7 | 167.6 |
| Average rainy days (≥ 0.2 mm) | 1.7 | 0.88 | 3.4 | 7.3 | 12.4 | 12.5 | 13.6 | 12.8 | 14.8 | 13.7 | 7.4 | 3.1 | 103.5 |
| Average snowy days (≥ 0.2 cm) | 17.2 | 13.5 | 9.5 | 5.3 | 1.2 | 0.0 | 0.0 | 0.0 | 0.21 | 3.3 | 11.3 | 15.7 | 77.1 |
| Average relative humidity (%) (at 15:00 LST) | 73.2 | 67.3 | 60.8 | 56.7 | 57.8 | 62.6 | 69.6 | 68.7 | 70.0 | 69.9 | 75.1 | 77.3 | 67.4 |
Source: Environment Canada

== Demographics ==
In the 2021 Census of Population conducted by Statistics Canada, Wawa had a population of 2,705 living in 1,213 of its 1,377 total private dwellings, a change of −6.9% from its 2016 population of 2,905. With a land area of 411.89 km^{2} (159.03 sq mi), it had a population density of 6.6/km^{2} (17.0/sq mi) in 2021.

Canada census – Wawa, Ontario community profile

| | 2021 | 2016 | 2011 |
| Population | 2,705 (-6.9% from 2016) | 2,905 (-2.4% from 2011) | 2,975 (-7.1% from 2006) |
| Land area | 411.89 km^{2} (159.03 sq mi) | 416.21 km^{2} (160.70 sq mi) | 417.78 km^{2} (161.31 sq mi) |
| Population density | 6.6/km^{2} (17/sq mi) | 7.0/km^{2} (18/sq mi) | 7.1/km^{2} (18/sq mi) |
| Median age | 47.2 (M: 46.4, F: 47.2) | 46.6 (M: 45.9, F: 47.7) | 44.1 (M: 43.6, F: 44.8) |
| Private dwellings | 1,377 (total) 1,213 (occupied) | 1,451 (total) | 1,517 (total) |
| Median household income | $80,000 | $66,752 | $53,354 |

References: 2021 2016 2011

Historical census populations – Wawa, Ontario

| Year | Pop. | ±% |
|---|---|---|
| 1956 | 3,086 | — |
| 1961 | 4,439 | +43.8% |
| 1966 | 4,927 | +11.0% |
| 1971 | 4,874 | −1.1% |
| 1976 | 4,940 | +1.4% |
| 1981 | 4,743 | −4.0% |
| 1986 | 4,481 | −5.5% |

| Year | Pop. | ±% |
|---|---|---|
| 1991 | 4,154 | −7.3% |
| 1996 | 4,145 | −0.2% |
| 2001 | 3,668 | −11.5% |
| 2006 | 3,204 | −12.6% |
| 2011 | 2,977 | −7.1% |
| 2016 | 2,905 | −2.4% |
| 2021 | 2,705 | −6.9% |

"Michipicoten Community Profile" prior to 2007.
Source: Statistics Canada

== Tourism and attractions ==
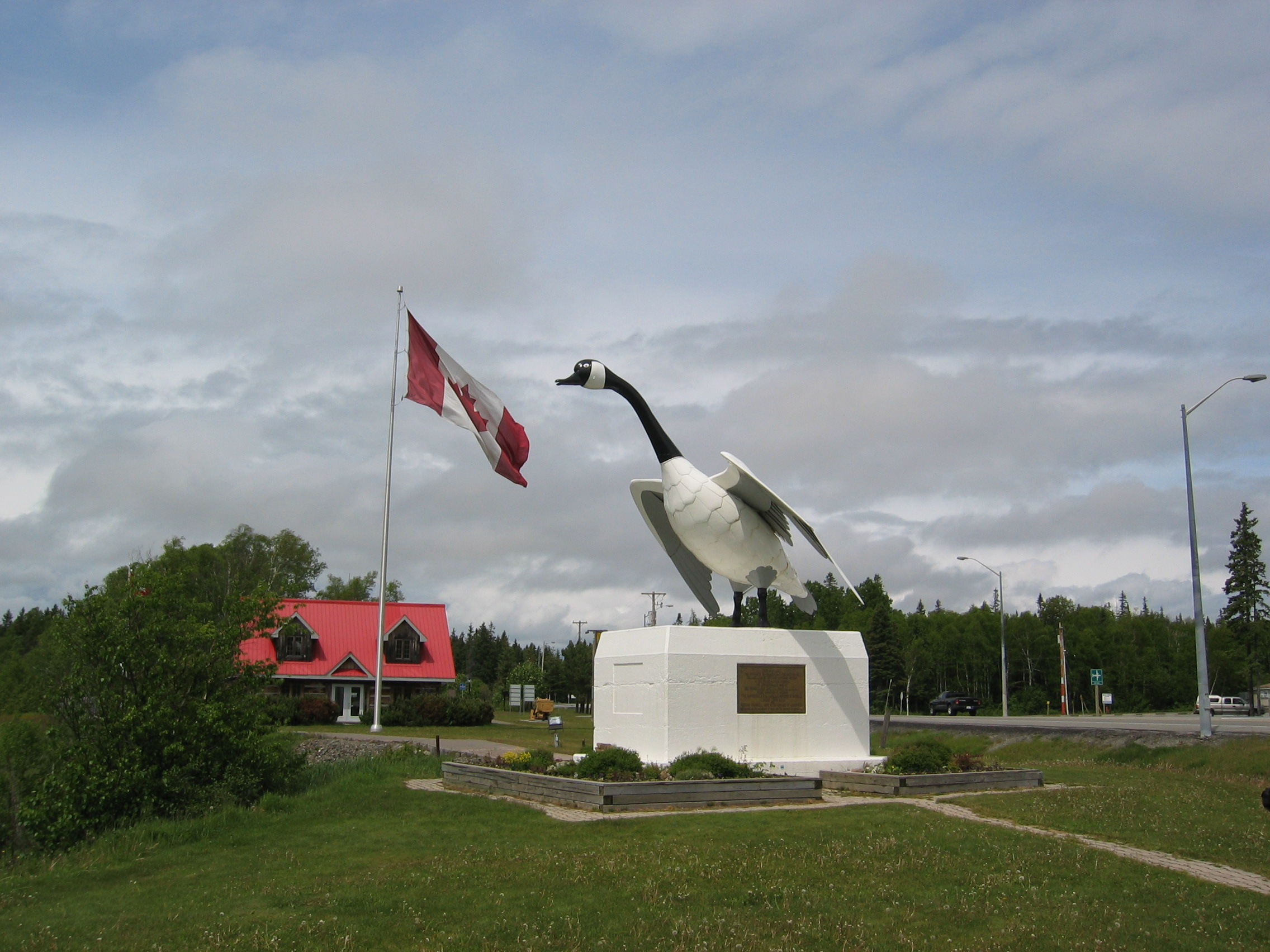
Goose sculpture in Wawa overlooking Highway 17

The community is known for its 8.5-metre (28-foot) metal statue of a Canada goose, which was built in 1960, and dedicated to the community in 1961. Wawa takes its name from the Ojibwe word for "wild goose", wewe. Wawa was defined as wild goose in The Song of Hiawatha. On July 5, 2010, Canada Post made a commemorative stamp of the Wawa Goose as part of its Roadside Attractions collection. On July 1, 2017, a new Wawa Goose was unveiled to replace the second aging goose.

The town is also known for snowmobiling and sport fishing. The Voyageur Hiking Trail passes through the town. One notable shopping location is Young's General Store, home of the locally famous Pickle Barrel.

Wawa was once home to a small ski hill, with a double chair installed by Timberland-Ellicott in 1966. The lift was used up until the 1990s, but was abandoned eventually. As of 2025 the property is now a hotel, and the haul rope has been removed from the lift.

== Politics ==
The municipal council is composed of one mayor and four councillors. The current mayor is Melanie Pilon. Councillors Cathy Cannon, Micheline Hatfield, Joseph Opato and Jim Hoffmann were elected on October 24, 2022, for a four-year term.

== Transportation ==
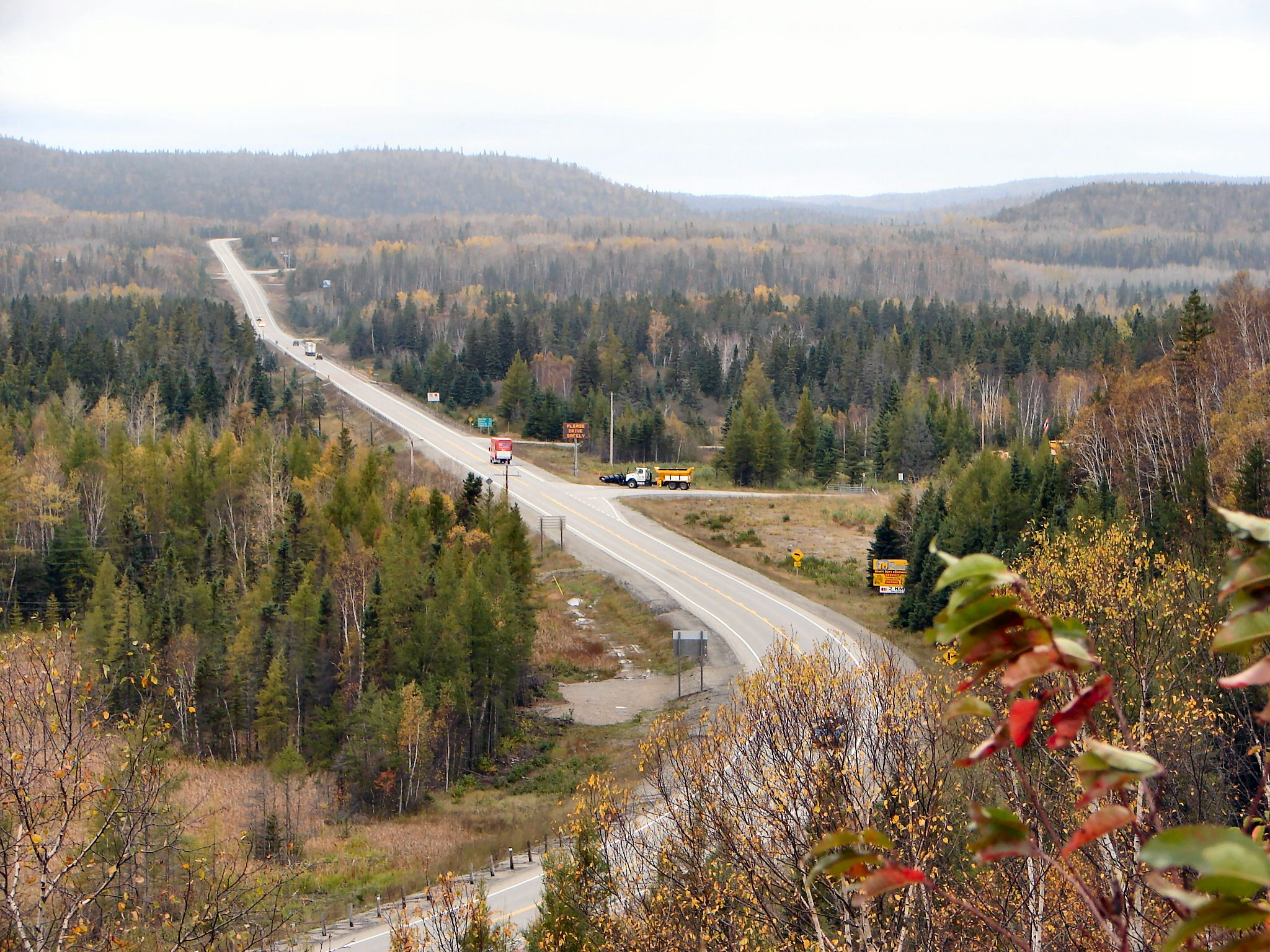
Highway 17 at Wawa

Highway 17, the main route of the Trans-Canada Highway, passes through the township, although the primary townsite is located on Highway 101, two kilometres (1.2 mi) east of the junction with Highway 17. Sault Ste. Marie is located 227 kilometres (141 mi) to the south. Lake Superior Provincial Park is located just south of the town.

In October 2012, the town was forced to declare a state of emergency after severe flooding washed out several roads within the municipality, including sections of both Highway 17 and Highway 101.

Wawa is located 24 kilometres (15 mi) west of Canadian National Railway's Hawk Junction station on the rail line from Sault Ste. Marie to Hearst. The line, formerly known as the Algoma Central Railway, provides tourist operations, as well as passenger and freight service to communities in northern Ontario.

A dial-in/demand response transit system has been available since February 2006. The service is provided by a single bus that can accommodate 12 passengers plus up to two wheelchairs.

Wawa has Ontario Northland motor coach service on its Sault Ste. Marie–Thunder Bay route.

== Education ==
Wawa is home to English and French language schools. The Algoma District School Board is responsible for offering English language instruction and operates Sir James Dunn Public School, offering kindergarten to Grade 8 classes, while Michipicoten High School offers Grades 9 to 12. The Huron-Superior Catholic District School Board provides French immersion language instruction for junior kindergarten to Grade 7 at St. Joseph French Immersion School. In the 2014–2015 school year St. Joseph School will expand its French immersion program to include Grade 8.

Exclusive French-language instruction is offered by two school boards. According to the 2011 Census, 19% of Wawa's population claimed French as their mother tongue. The Conseil scolaire du Grand Nord offers public school instruction at École publique l'Escalade for students in kindergarten to Grade 8. The Conseil scolaire catholique du Nouvel-Ontario offers Catholic instruction at École élémentaire et secondaire catholique St-Joseph.

== Media ==
=== Radio ===
| Frequency | Call sign | Branding | Format | Owner | Notes |
|---|---|---|---|---|---|
| FM 88.3 | CBLJ-FM | CBC Radio One | public news/talk | Canadian Broadcasting Corporation | rebroadcasts CBCS-FM Sudbury |
| FM 90.7 | CBON-FM-27 | Ici Radio-Canada Première | public news/talk | Canadian Broadcasting Corporation | French, rebroadcasts CBON-FM Sudbury |
| FM 107.1 | CJWA-FM | | adult contemporary | Labbe Media | |

=== Television ===
| OTA channel | Call sign | Network | Notes |
|---|---|---|---|
| 7 (VHF) | CHBX-TV-1 | CTV | Rebroadcaster of CHBX-TV (Sault Ste Marie); de fact rebroadcaster of CICI-TV (Sudbury) |

=== Print ===
- wawa-news.com
- Algoma News Review, was a newspaper that printed its final edition, after nearly six decades in 2022.

== Notable people ==
Wawa is home to former NHL hockey players Chris Simon and Denny Lambert as well as comedian Pete Zedlacher.

== In popular culture ==
- Most of the 2006 film Snow Cake was filmed in Wawa.
- The 2019 film Brotherhood was filmed at Michipicoten First Nation and included cast members and crew from the First Nation and Wawa.

== See also ==
- List of municipalities in Ontario
- List of townships in Ontario
- List of francophone communities in Ontario
- Barrick Gold
- Wawa Runestone
