= Missinaibi Lake =

Lake in Ontario, Canada

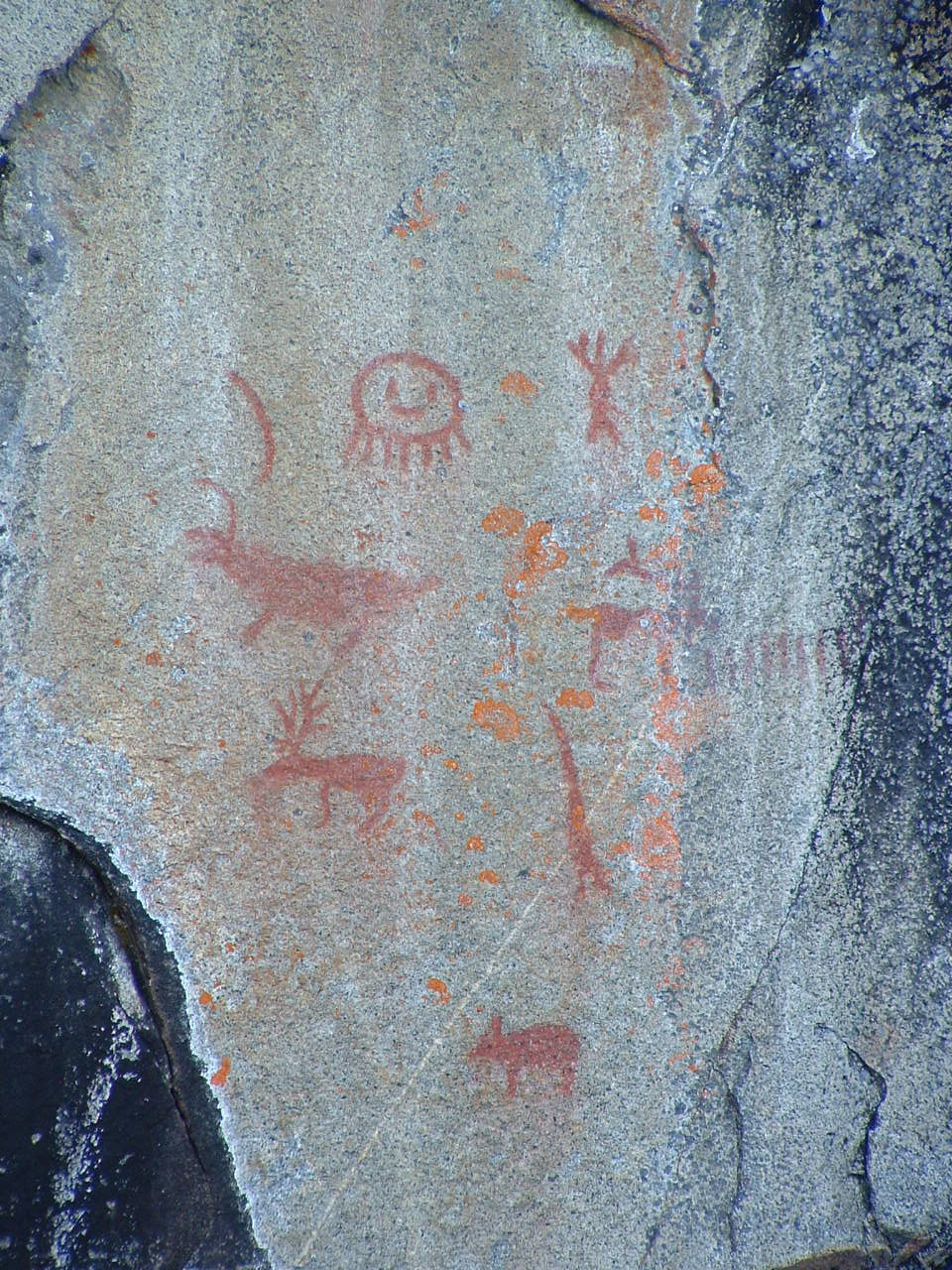
- Pictographs on Fairy Point

- Location within Ontario
- Location: Sudbury District, Ontario, Canada
- Coordinates: 48°20′N 83°45′W
- Primary inflows: Little Missinaibi River
- Primary outflows: Missinaibi River
- Basin countries: Canada
- Surface area: 11.71 km^{2} (4.52 sq mi)
- Average depth: 19 m (62 ft)
- Max. depth: 94 m (308 ft)
- Surface elevation: 319 m (1,047 ft)

Missinaibi Lake (Cree: masinâpôy sâkahikan, ᒪᓯᓈᐴᔾ ᓵᑲᐦᐃᑲᐣ) is a lake in Ontario, Canada, about 60 kilometres (37 mi) north of Chapleau. It is the source of the Missinaibi River, which drains the lake at the northeastern point and flows northeastward into the Moose River. Together with the Missinaibi River, Brunswick River, Brunswick Lake, Little Missinaibi River, and Little Missinaibi Lake, the shores and waters of the lake are part of the Missinaibi Provincial Park. The lake is also in the middle of the Chapleau Crown Game Preserve.

The lake is named after the river of the same name, (masinâpôy sîpiy, ᒪᓯᓈᐴᔾ ᓰᐱᔾ) meaning "pictured waters" in the Cree language, which is thought to refer to the pictographs found on rock faces along the river. There are several sites around the lake where such aboriginal rock paintings are found. In particular, there are more than 100 rock paintings on a cliff face at Fairy Point, depicting among other things Mishipeshu, caribou, bears, foxes, and canoes. The lake is accessible at Barclay Bay via Barclay Bay Road (a 88 km-long (55 mi) gravel road) from Chapleau, where there is a boat launch and campground.

== History ==
During the Woodland period, Cree and Ojibwe peoples travelled Missinaibi Lake as part of their waterway network linking the Great Lakes with James Bay. The first written record about the lake is a French account from 1666.

In 1777, the Hudson's Bay Company (HBC) first set up a fur trade post, called Missinaibi House, on the lake near its outlet. It was meant to forestall competition from other traders on Lake Superior and provided a link in the inland route from Moose Factory to Michipicoten via the Moose and Missinaibi Rivers. During hostilities with the indigenous in 1790, the post burned down and was not reestablished until 1800 as a temporary camp, serving as an outpost for New Brunswick House on Brunswick Lake. The North West Company (NWC) also had a post on the lake from 1800 to 1803. In 1821, when these two companies merged, the post closed.

In 1873, the HBC reopened the post, now called Missinaibi Lake House. After the closure of New Brunswick House in 1879, whose operations were moved to Missinaibi Lake House, it gained greater importance and became the inland headquarters of HBC's Michipicoten District. Between 100 and 200 Cree and Ojibwa families came to live near the post. In the 1880s, the Canadian Pacific Railway was built at Dog Lake, to the west of Missinaibi Lake, where the railroad town of Missanabie was founded. To avoid confusion, Missinaibi Lake House was renamed to New Brunswick circa 1887. Although river travel declined due to the railroad, trade at Missinaibi Lake was not severely impacted since the post still controlled the trade north along the river. However, by 1913, the post was no longer profitable because the town of Peterbell was built to the north on the Missinaibi River along the Canadian Northern Railway. At this time, many indigenous families began to leave Missinaibi Lake, and the post closed permanently in 1916, having its operations moved to Peterbell.

In 1925, the Chapleau Crown Game Preserve was formed and remaining indigenous families at Missinaibi Lake were ordered to leave. Around the same time, logging began in the area, continuing into the late 1950s. A notable remnant of this period is the Borasso Logging Camp, accessible via a 3 km (1.9 mi) trail from Baltic Bay. The camp, used to bring logs to a mill in Peterbell, has remnants of bunk houses, mess hall, blacksmith shop, and a stable, with artifacts scattered about.

In 1970, the Missinaibi Lake Provincial Park was established but included only the central and eastern part of Missinaibi Lake. In 1989, the entire lake was protected when the park was enlarged and reorganized into the Missinaibi Provincial Park. In 2004, the Missinaibi River (and therefore by extension the lake as well) was designated as a Canadian Heritage River.

== Geography ==
Situated on the Canadian Shield, Missinaibi Lake is shaped like a huge "Y"; its southern branch is called South Bay, the western arm called Baltic Bay, and the eastern arm Barclay Bay. At the centre of the "Y" are the cliffs of Fairy Point, protruding about 30 metres (100 ft) high above and below the waterline, where the waves of the lake's 3 long arms converge and break against the rocks, making lake travel dangerous even in moderate wind.

The lake, roughly 40 kilometres (25 mi) long, has a surface area of 1,171 hectares (2,890 acres), with an average depth of 19 metres (62 ft) and a maximum depth of 94 metres (308 ft). Its waters are uncontaminated and without invasive species. Its fish species include lake trout, walleye, pike, and smallmouth bass.

At the entrance to South Bay is Reva Island, an ancient indigenous burial site that has old-growth pine trees that may be up to 500 years old. The Little Missinaibi River drains into Missinaibi Lake on its eastern side, dropping about 5 metres (16 ft) through a narrow natural spillway over the Whitefish Falls.
