= Wabatongushi Lake =

Lake in Ontario, Canada

- Interactive map of Wabatongushi Lake
- Location: Ontario
- Coordinates: 48°26′30″N 84°12′30″W
- Primary outflows: Lochalsh River
- Basin countries: Canada
- Max. length: 35 km (22 mi)
- Max. depth: 175 ft (53 m)

Wabatongushi Lake is a lake in Northern Ontario, Canada, within the Chapleau Crown Game Preserve. The Lake is about 2/3 of the way north on the route at milepost 206 north from Sault Ste. Marie, approximately 42 miles north of Hawk Junction and approximately 90 miles south of Hearst.

Sitting on the crest of the northern watershed, it is the top lake in a chain that stretches almost 100 miles. For both First Nations and Voyageurs, if formed part of a traditional transportation route from Hudson Bay to Lake Superior .

== Etymology ==
Wabatongushi in the Ojibwa language approximately means "White Sand Lake".

== Description ==
The north end of the lake is shallow with many low, swampy areas. The south half of the lake is much deeper, with a maximum depth of 175' located right off of Loch Island Lodge. The shoreline on the south end is much higher, with exposed Pre-Cambrian shield plummeting straight into the tea-stained water.

== Fishing ==
The north end of the lake is perfect habitat for walleye, northern pike, and is ideal for large game fish. Bait fish schooling off of the southern shorelines attract the game fish. Fishing is excellent in these locations, and on the south end near Loch Island Lodge.

== Features ==
Algoma Central Railway flag stop
located at the northwest corner of the lake. No longer in service, the line is now for freight only. The service once operated from Sault Ste. Marie with a mid station at Hawk Junction just east of Wawa and had a northern terminus at Hearst. Before passenger service ceased in 2015, the Algoma Central Railway provided train access for fishing, wildlife and wilderness vacations, and for canoeing, kayaking and other wilderness recreation.

Errington's Wilderness Island
a fishing and wilderness vacation lodge on an island 1.5 miles from the Algoma Central Railway flag stop and has been in operation since the mid-1950s.

Canadian Pacific rail siding
located at the south end of the lake and currently provides the VIA Rail passenger service between the lake and White River, known locally as the Budd Car.

== See also ==
- List of lakes in Ontario
- Algoma Central Railway
