= Chapleau Crown Game Preserve =

Animal preserve area in Ontario, Canada

Coordinates: 48°25′N 83°45′W

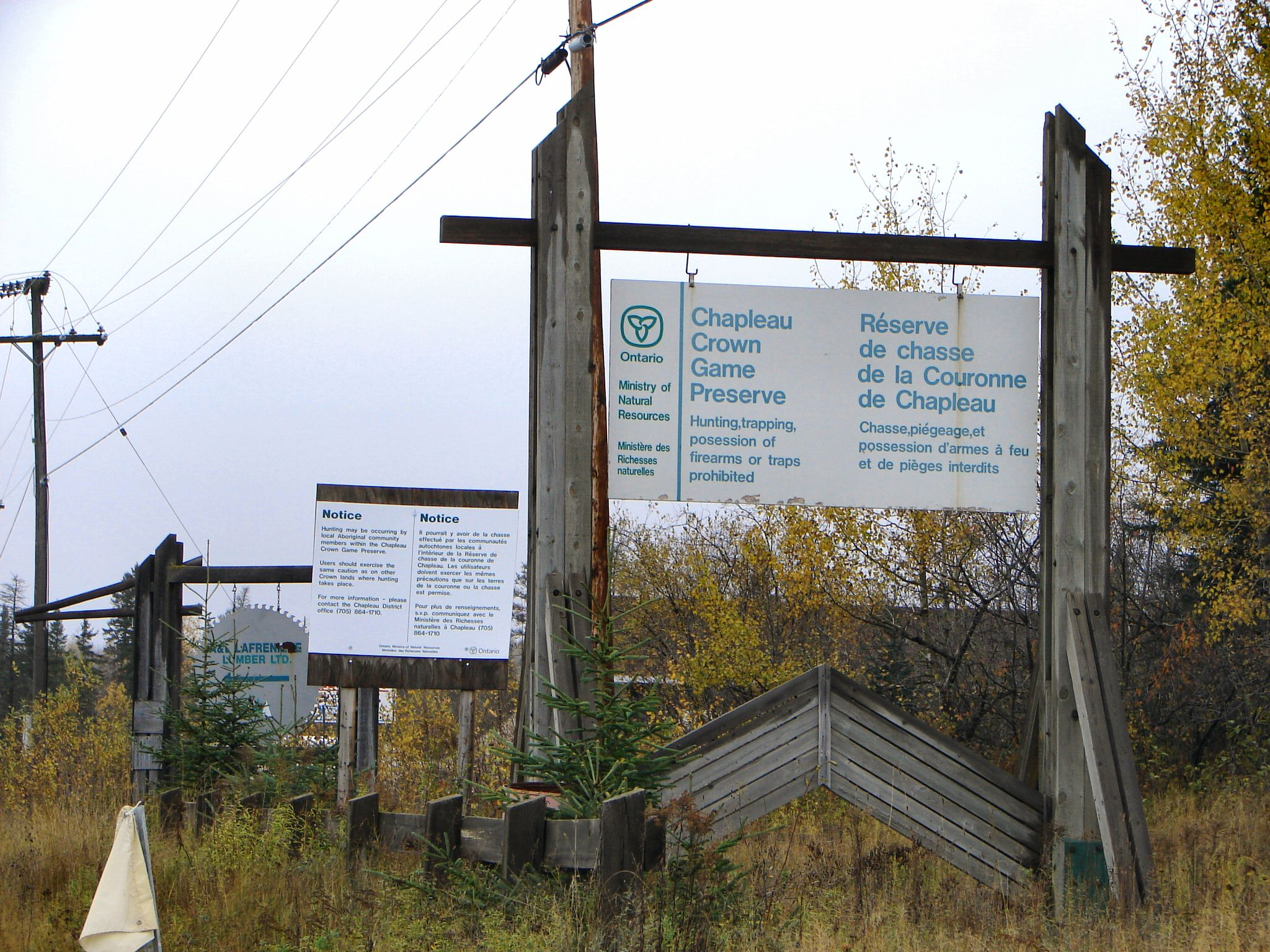
Entrance sign

The Chapleau Crown Game Preserve is a fur bearing animal preserve area in Ontario, Canada, north-east of Lake Superior. It covers some 7,000 square kilometres (2,700 sq mi) in the Algoma and Sudbury Districts, and is officially classified as a Crown Game Preserve by the Government of Ontario Ministry of Natural Resources.

All animals have been protected from hunting and trapping in the preserve since its formation in 1925.

The game preserve is bound by the Canadian National Railway to the north, the Chapleau River to the east, the Canadian Pacific Railway to the south, and by the Algoma Central Railway to the west. It encompasses Pichogen River Provincial Park and part of Missinaibi Provincial Park, whereas the Chapleau-Nemegosenda River Provincial Park is on its eastern boundary:

"An Order-in-Council dated May 27, 1925 designated all that territory bounded on the south by the Canadian Pacific Railway from Chapleau to Franz, on the west by the Algoma Central and Hudson Bay Railway from Franz to Oba, on the north by the Canadian National Railways from Oba to the hamlet of Agate near Elsas, and on the east by the Chapleau or Kebsquasheshing River from Agate to the place of the commencement as the "Chapleau Crown Game Preserve" - Vince Chrichton - 'The History of the Chapleau Crown Game Preserve' Found in Ontario Archives. The border was changed slightly in 1930. It was moved a few miles east from Agate to Kapuskasing Station which today is known as Elsas.

== History ==
The area is the homeland of the Ojibwa and Cree people of Northern Ontario, where they would not only hunt and fish, but had a rich culture and relationship to the landscape. Several sites with pictographs still testify to their past presence, especially Fairy Point on Missinaibi Lake.

The first Europeans were probably the coureurs des bois, looking for new fur trade territory. In the 17th and 18th century, the French and English traders visited the area. At the end of the 18th century, The Hudson's Bay Company and the North West Company both had posts in the area - including Brunswick House at Missinaibi Lake. This marked decades of trade war in the area, until the two companies amalgamated in 1821. The HBC dominated the area's trade until the CPR line was built in 1885. This resulted in the influx of settlers.

The Cree and Ojibwa of the area negotiated and signed the Robinson Superior Treaty and Treaty 9, which guaranteed their rights to hunt, fish, and trap on the area.

By the early 20th century, both the Canadian Pacific and Canadian National Railways crossed the area and allowed easier access for prospecting, hunting, and logging. It was not long before the exploitation resulted in a depletion of wildlife. In particular, game and fur-bearing animals were over-hunted alarmingly.

William McLeod (1872–1940), from Chapleau, Ontario, brought the issue to the attention of the Ontario Government and on May 27, 1925, the Chapleau Crown Game Preserve was established. The creation of the Game Preserve was one, and only one, of fifteen recommendations William McLeod made in a 1923 paper he wrote on the problems of the fur trade in Northeastern Ontario. Almost all of the recommendations were eventually enacted into law by the Government of Ontario. All hunting and trapping was and still is prohibited within the Game preserve's boundaries. This left the First Nations of the area without a subsistence lifestyle, and resulted in ongoing conflict about their rights and access to hunting in the Game Preserve.

The Brunswick House Band was relocated to a new reserve near Elsas on the main line of the Canadian National Railway. In 1948 they were relocated to another new Reserve at Tophet on the main line of the Canadian Pacific Railway east of Chapleau. They were again relocated in 1973 to yet another reserve at Duck Lake on Highway 101 three miles from Chapleau where they live today.

== Wildlife ==
Wildlife abounds in the preserve, allowing many exceptional viewing opportunities. Animals present in the preserve include:

- Moose
- American black bear
- Red fox
- Canada lynx
- Timber wolf
- Marten
- Beaver
- Otter
- Mink
- Ruffed and spruce grouse
- Bald eagle
- Loon

== Access ==
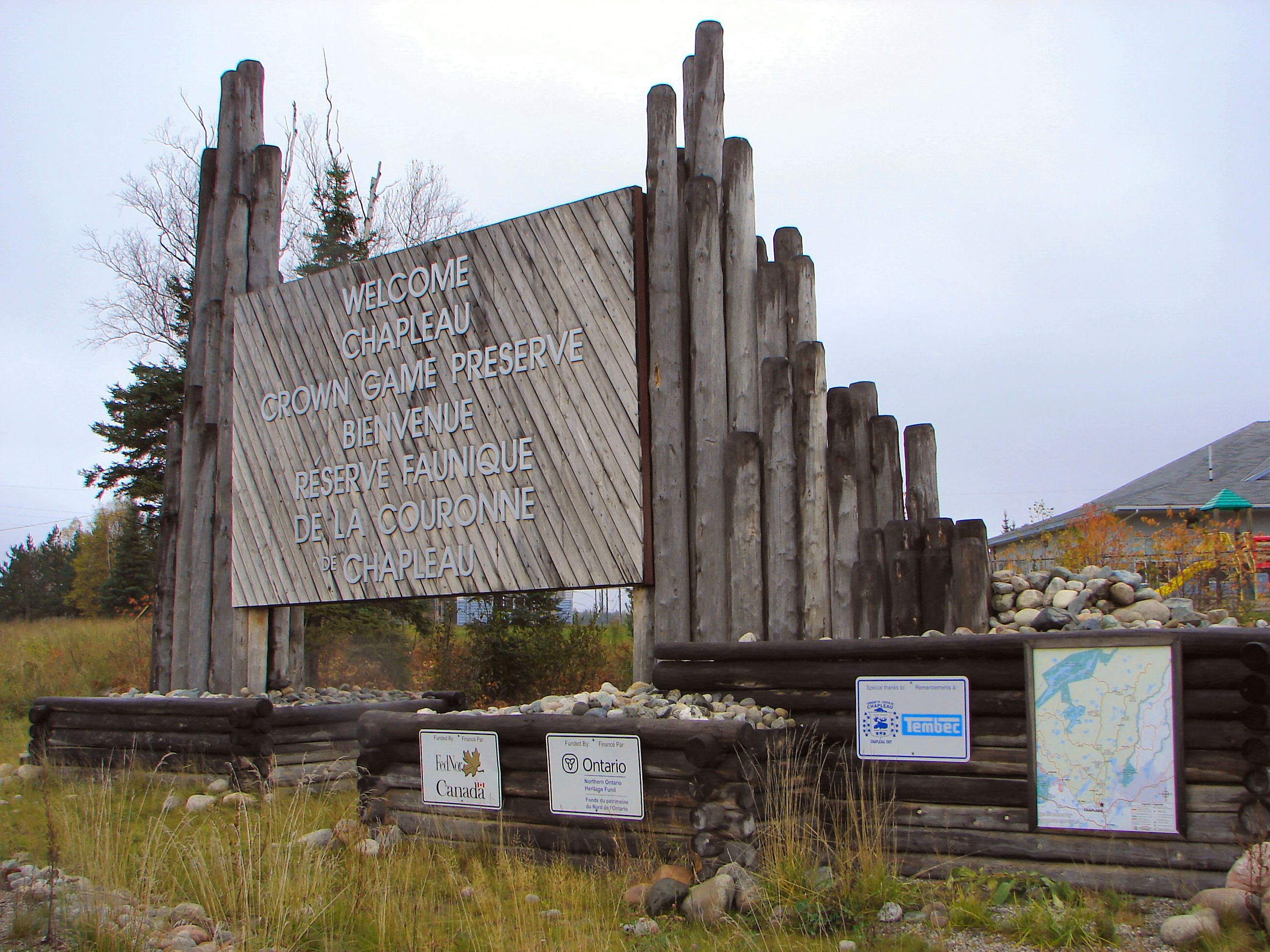
Welcome sign at Chapleau

The primary access to the southeastern portion of the preserve is through the community of Chapleau, from which forest roads provide access to many of the preserve's interior lakes and rivers and Missinaibi Provincial Park.

The Algoma Central Railway passenger Ttrain provides access to the western portions of the preserve including access to traditional canoe routes that flow to both Lake Superior and Hudson Bay from the height of land that roughly parallels the Canadian Pacific Railway border of the Preserve between Chapleau and Franz. One canoe route starts immediately south of the height of land at Wabatongushi Lake which is the headwaters on the Michipicoten River that flows to Lake Superior. The second canoe route starts just north of height of land at Oba Lake which flows into the Oba River, then into the Albany River system to Hudson Bay.

The existing CN and CP railways provide access to the area for logging operations with several stops in the area, such as:

- Elsas
- Peterbell
- Dalton
- Nicholson
- Akron
