= Missanabie =

- Unincorporated community
- Location within Ontario
- Coordinates: 48°18′41″N 84°05′02″W
- Country: Canada
- Province: Ontario
- District: Algoma
- Census subdiv.: Unorg. North Algoma
- Founded: 1880s

Area
  - Land: 0.27 km^{2} (0.10 sq mi)
- Elevation: 335 m (1,098 ft)

Population (2021)
  - Total: 33
  - Density: 121.3/km^{2} (314/sq mi)
- Time zone: UTC-5 (EST)
  - Summer (DST): UTC-4 (EDT)
- Postal code: P0M
- Area codes: 705, 249

Missanabie is a community in the Canadian province of Ontario, located in the Algoma District at the northern terminus of Highway 651, inside the boundaries of the Chapleau Crown Game Preserve.

A designated place served by a local services board, the community had a population of 33 in the 2021 Canadian census.

Missanabie, located on the north end of Dog Lake, caters to outdoor recreation and serves as the starting point for fishing/hunting trips and lodges in the area.

== History ==
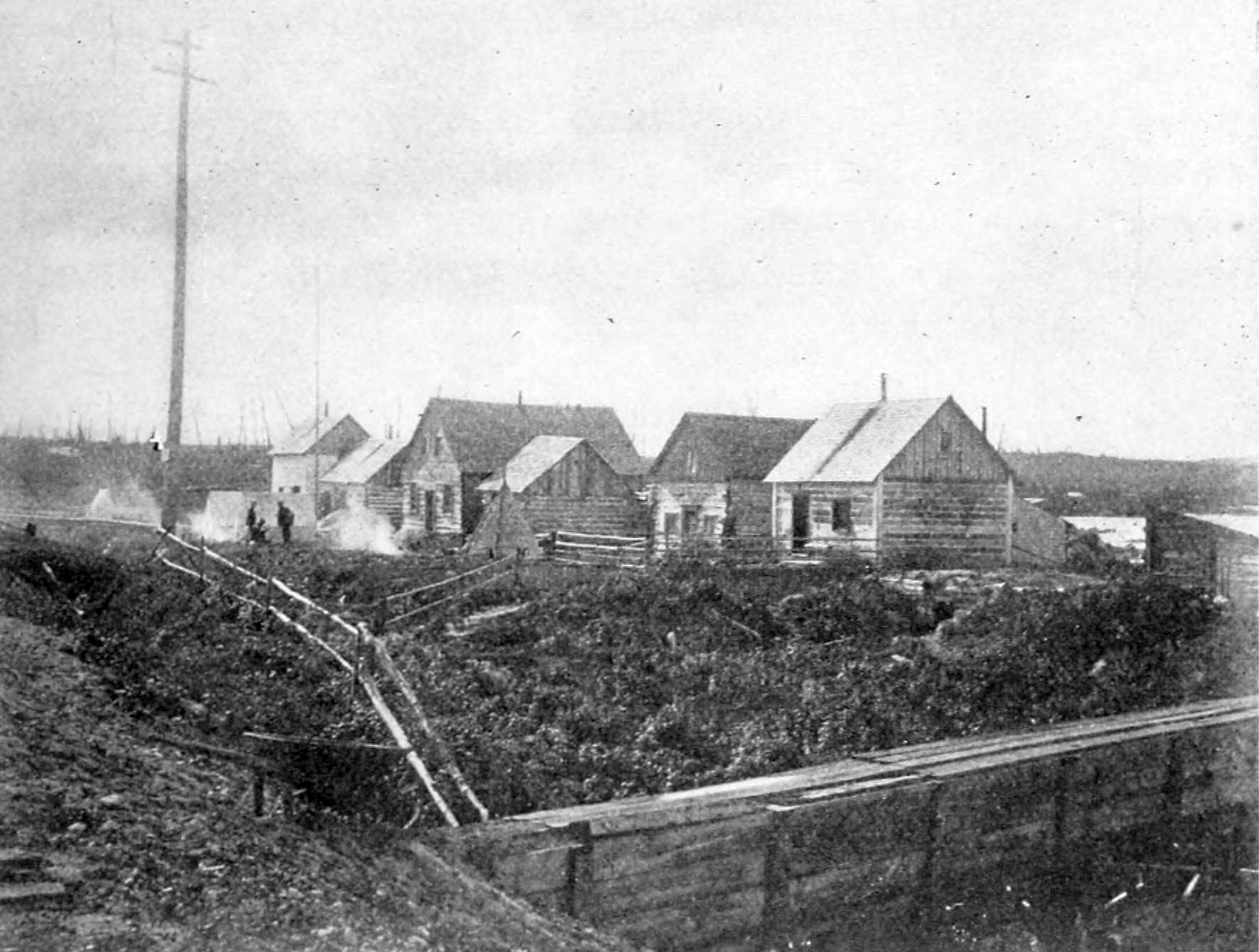
Missanabie, 1897

Missanabie was founded as a railroad town along the Canadian Pacific Railway that was completed in 1885. Its name is a corruption of Missinaibi. In 1893, its post office opened.

In 1887, the Hudson's Bay Company established a fur trade post in Missanabie, opposite the station. Facing competition of several other companies, including Revillon Frères, it supplied the HBC New Brunswick post on Missinaibi Lake. After the completion of 2 more east-west railways through northern Ontario (the Canadian Northern Railway and the National Transcontinental Railway) in 1912, the inland HBC posts along the Missinaibi River were no longer needed, and the Missanabie post became more important as HBC's supply hub, taking over this role from Moose Factory. On June 1, 1938, the Missanabie post was closed and sold.

== Demographics ==
In the 2021 Census of Population conducted by Statistics Canada, Missanabie had a population of 33 living in 15 of its 38 total private dwellings, a change of −17.5% from its 2016 population of 40. With a land area of 0.27 km^{2} (0.10 sq mi), it had a population density of 122.2/km^{2} (316.6/sq mi) in 2021.

Canada census – Missanabie Local Service Board community profile

	2021	2016
Population	33 (-17.5% from 2016)	40 (+37.9% from 2011)
Land area	0.27 km^{2} (0.10 sq mi)	0.30 km^{2} (0.12 sq mi)
Population density	121.3/km^{2} (314/sq mi)	135.0/km^{2} (350/sq mi)
Median age		47.0 (M: 44.0, F: 49.0)
Private dwellings	38 (total) 15 (occupied)	38 (total) 16 (occupied)
Median household income

References: 2021 2016

Historical census populations – Missanabie
Year	Pop.	±%
2006	62	—
2011	29	−53.2%
2016	40	+37.9%
2021	33	−17.5%
Source: Statistics Canada
