= Edward Jarvis (businessman) =

Edward Jarvis (died c. 1800) was a surgeon and Hudson's Bay Company (HBC) chief factor, best known for his work exploring and attempts to establish Hudson's Bay Company (HBC) trading posts in the interior of Canada during the late 18th century.

== Early life and career ==
Edward Jarvis started working for the Hudson's Bay Company (HBC) in 1771 as a surgeon at Fort Albany, Ontario, earning £40 a year. He learned the Swampy Cree language and led an expedition to find strategic locations for trading posts along the Moose and Albany rivers, as well as areas around James Bay and Lake Superior. This was in response to increasing competition from other traders.

== Expeditions and challenges ==
Jarvis and his team first set out from Fort Albany on March 29, 1775, but had to return after the Indigenous people at Henley House did not want to act as guides. He then left with another team and reached Moose Factory in November that year, after crossing the Missinaibi River, facing tough terrain and other difficulties. He returned to Henley House by February 1776. In May of that year, he focused on surveying Indigenous around Lake Superior and documenting the people living there. Throughout these trips, he dealt with extreme weather, illness, food shortages, and resistance from local groups.

== Role as Chief Factor ==
Jarvis refused to go inland after the 1776 expedition. He spent the years 1776 until 1778 between Albany and Henley House. After a brief return to England in 1778, Jarvis was re-engaged by the HBC in 1779 and appointed Chief Factor at Moose Factory. In 1781, he transferred to Albany, where he advocated for the establishment of more inland posts to challenge the growing influence of the North West Company. However, Jarvis' health began to deteriorate in the early 1790s, and he retired from active duty in 1792.

== Later years and retirement ==
In 1796, Jarvis was reappointed Chief Inspector and Supervisor of HBC posts along Hudson and James bays as part of a strategy to manage internal leadership conflicts. However, he was unwelcome at York Factory when he moved in August 1796, and his health issues stopped him continuing.

Jarvis retired in 1797 with a pension of 50 guineas per year. The last record of his financial dealings with HBC is from March 1800, and he is believed to have died soon after.
