= Philip Turnor =

Surveyor

Philip Turnor (c. 1751 – c. 1799) was a surveyor and cartographer for the Hudson's Bay Company.

Turnor hired on for three years as an inland surveyor with the HBC and landed at York Factory, now in Manitoba, in August 1778. After mapping York itself, he set out to map the route to Cumberland House, now in Saskatchewan, and the newly-established post of Upper Hudson House.

He is credited with exploring and mapping many of the settlements and their connecting rivers and lakes for the company in the late 18th century.

A variety of willow, unique to the sand dunes of Lake Athabasca, is named "Turnor's willow" in his honour. He is credited with teaching David Thompson and Peter Fidler the skills of surveying.

== Sources ==
- "Philip Turnor". Dictionary of Canadian Biography (online ed.). University of Toronto Press. 1979–2016.
- Journals of Samuel Hearne and Philip Turnor between the Years 1774 and 1792. Joseph Tyrrell ed. Toronto: Champlain Society, 1934.
- Mitchell, Barbara. Mapmaker: Philip Turnor in Rupert's Land in the Age of Enlightenment. Regina: University of Regina Press, 2017.
