= Missinaibi River =

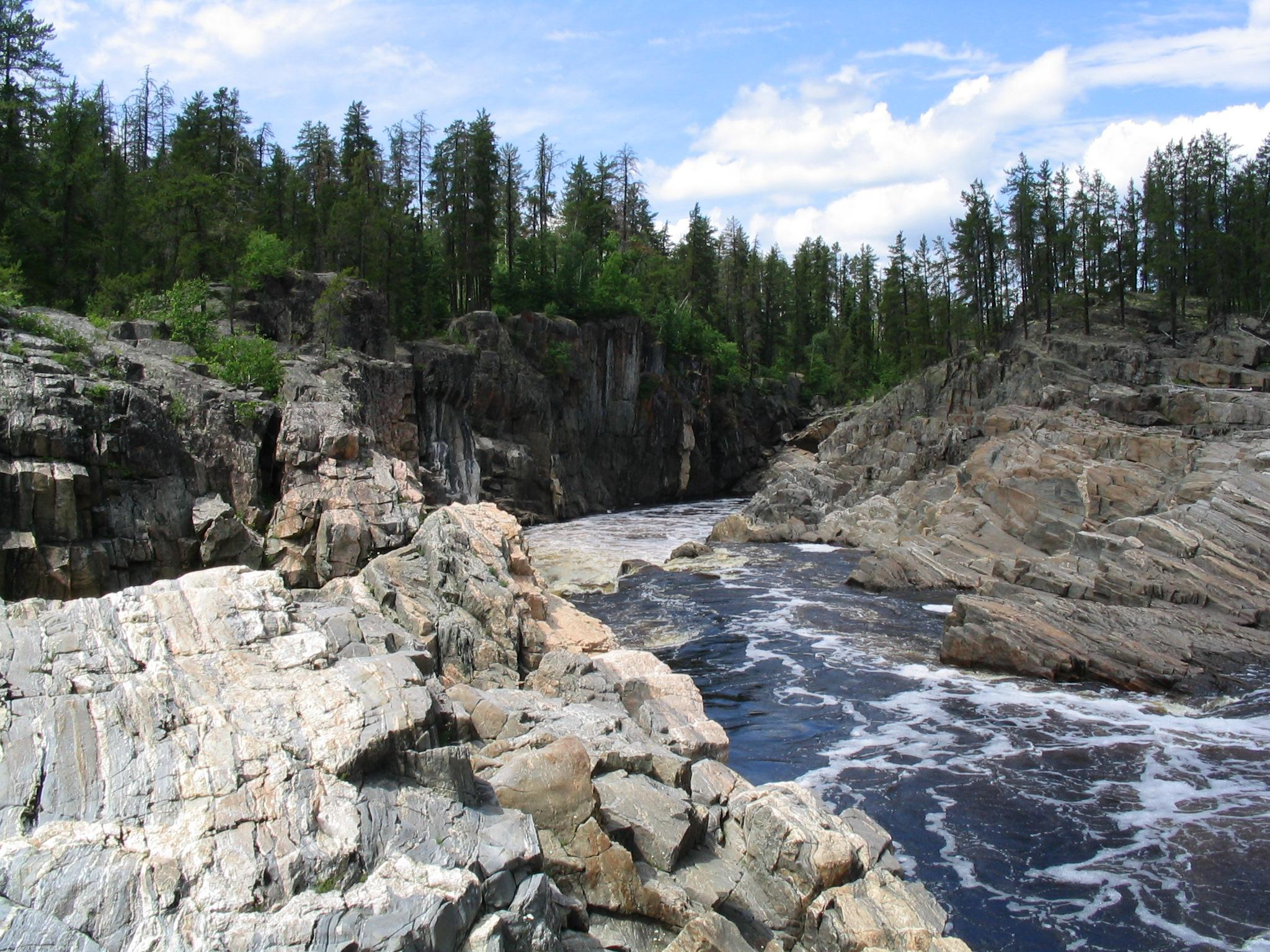
- Thunderhouse Falls
- Native name: masinâpôy sîpiy — ᒪᓯᓈᐴᔾ ᓰᐱᔾ (Cree)

Location
- Country: Canada
- Province: Ontario
- Districts: Algoma; Cochrane

Physical characteristics
- Source: Missinaibi Lake
  - location: 12 km SSW from Peterbell inside the Chapleau Crown Game Preserve, Algoma District
  - coordinates: 48°29′56″N 83°25′52″W
- Mouth: Moose River
  - location: Unorg. Cochrane District
  - coordinates: 50°44′08″N 81°28′02″W
- Length: 426 km (265 mi)
- Basin size: 23,500 km^{2} (9,100 sq mi)

Conjuring Rock below Thunderhouse Falls

The Missinaibi River is a river in northern Ontario, Canada, which flows northeast from Missinaibi Lake, north of Chapleau, and empties into the Moose River, which drains into James Bay. This river (including Missinaibi Lake and Moose River to James Bay) is 755 kilometres (469 mi) in length. It is one of the longest free-flowing and undeveloped rivers in Ontario.

The river's name (masinâpôy sîpiy, ᒪᓯᓈᐴᔾ ᓰᐱᔾ) means "pictured waters" in the Cree language which is thought to refer to the pictographs found on rock faces along the river.

At Thunderhouse Falls, which is actually a chain of relatively small waterfalls connected by violent rapids, the river drops 40 metres, part of its descent from the Canadian Shield to the Hudson Bay Lowlands.

== History ==
In fur trade days the Missinaibi was the main route between James Bay and Lake Superior. The route was: James Bay, Moose Factory, Moose River, Missinaibi River, Missinaibi Lake, portage probably via Crooked Lake, Dog Lake, Michipicoten River to Fort Michipicoten on Lake Superior. Trade was contested by the English from the north and the French from the south. In 1774 the Hudson's Bay Company began building posts in the interior. In 1775-76 Edward Jarvis from Henley House went up the Kenogami River, crossed to the Missinaibi and went down to Michicopicten. In 1781 Philip Turnor surveyed the Missinaibi route to Michicopicten.

The three main posts, all at times called Brunswick House or similar were

- Wapiscogamy House: In 1776 Thomas Atkinson from Fort Albany, Ontario went 200 miles upriver and established Wapiscogamy House on the west bank of the river. It was rebuilt in 1781, named Brunswick House, closed in 1791, and re-opened from 1800 to 1806.
- Missinaibi Lake House: In 1777 John Thomas was sent from Moose Factory to build a post at Michipicoten on Lake Superior. He selected a better location at the outflow of Missinaibi Lake and called it Missinaibi Lake House. It was occupied each summer until it burnt in 1780. The site was re-occupied from 1817 until about 1821. It was reopened in the early 1870s and in 1879 renamed New Brunswick House. When the railroad was built just north of the lake in 1912-13 operations were moved to the new town of Peterbell and the post was closed in 1914. Around 1980 there were left a few cellar holes and collapsed buildings.
- Macabanish House: In 1788 William Boland established a post between the other two on Micabanish Lake on a tributary west of the river. Its success led to the closing of Wapiscogamy House. In 1799 it was named New Brunswick House and the lake renamed Brunswick Lake. It was the chief post until 1879 when it, and its name, were transferred to Missinaibi Lake. Around 1990 the clearing where it stood was visible from the air. Brunswick House First Nation gets its name from this and the one on Missinaibi Lake.

Today, the river is used for canoeing, fishing, and camping. Recreational use is facilitated by an arrangement which allows canoeists to load their boats on a train so they can be returned south, after canoeing the wild stretches of the river. The river is managed as a provincial waterway park and was designated as a Canadian Heritage River in 2004.

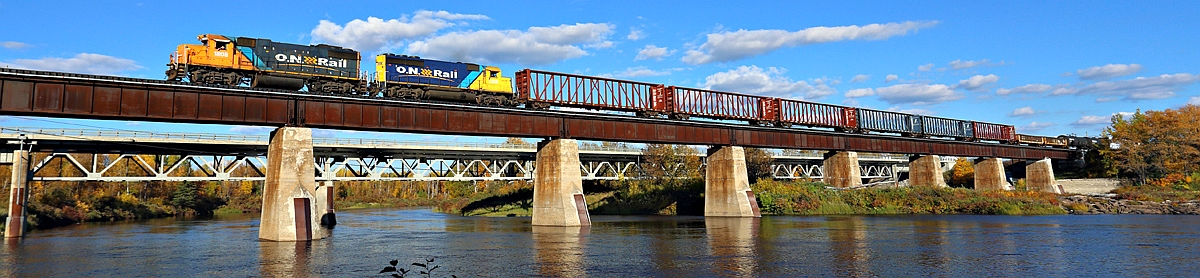
Ontario Northland freight train crossing the Missinaibi River at Mattice-Val Côté in Northern Ontario

== Tributaries ==
- Brunswick River
- Fire River
- Greenhill River
- Hay River
- Mattawitchewan River
  - Albany Forks
    - Oba River, Oba Lake
- Pivabiska River
- Opasatika River
- Soweska River
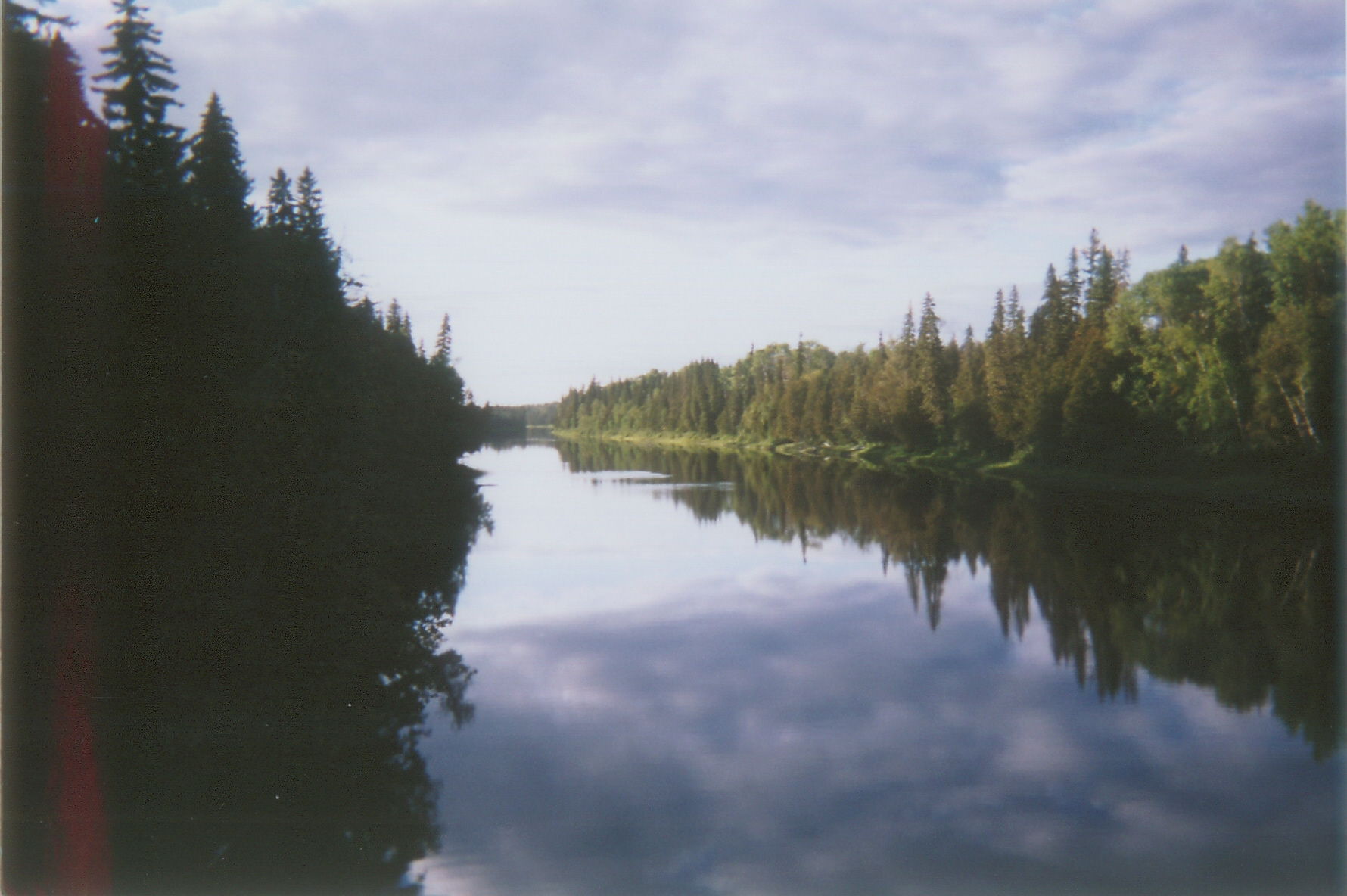
Missinaibi River

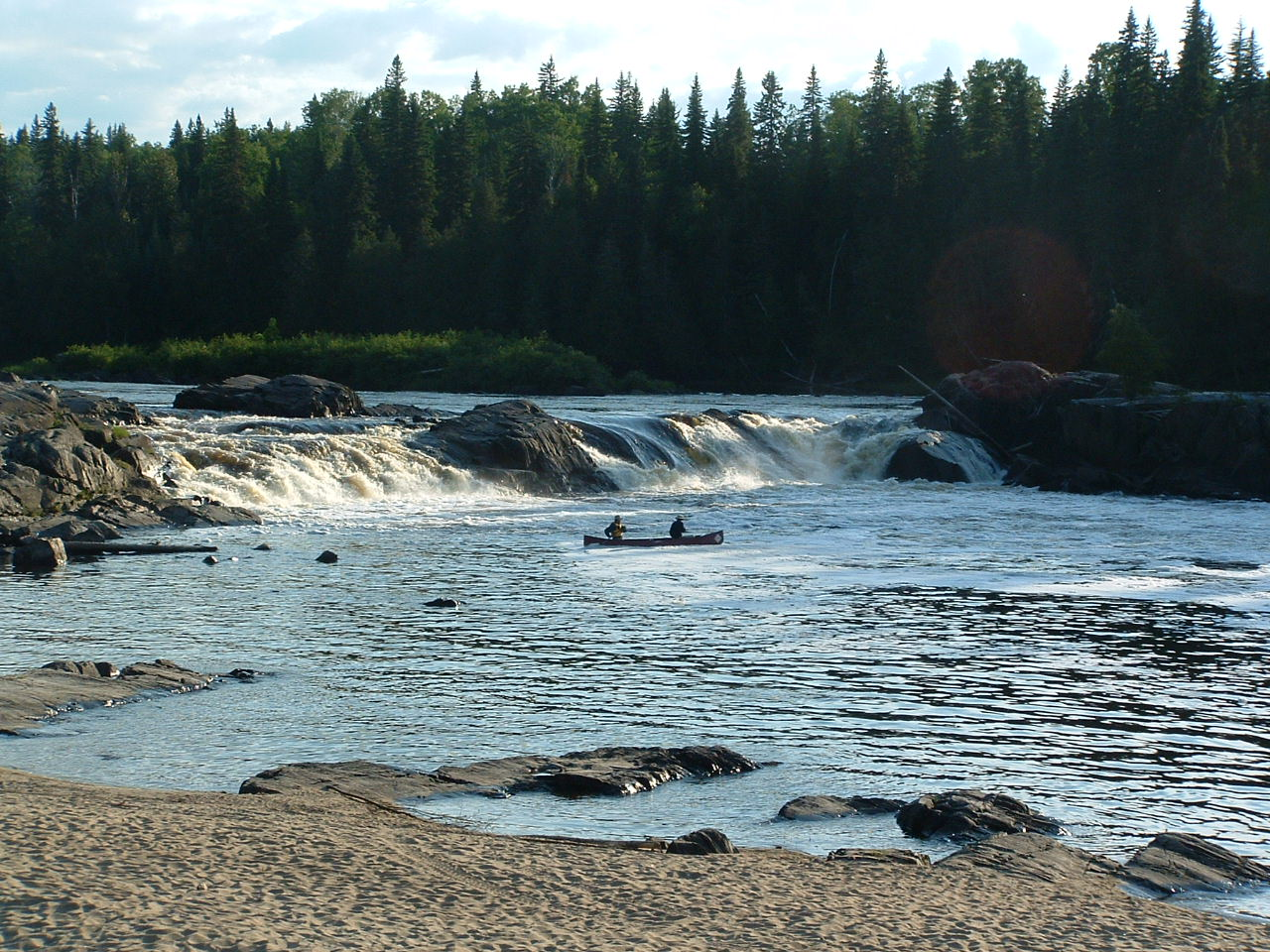
Glassy Falls

== Missinaibi Provincial Park ==
Missinaibi Provincial Park
- IUCN category II (national park)
- Interactive map of Missinaibi Provincial Park
- Location: Ontario, Canada
- Nearest city: Mattice
- Area: 990.90 km^{2} (382.59 sq mi)
- Established: 1970, enlarged in 1989
- Governing body: Ontario Parks

The entire length of the Missinaibi River from Missinaibi Lake to the Moose River is protected and part of the Missinaibi Provincial Park. The park also includes Missinaibi Lake, Brunswick River, Brunswick Lake, Little Missinaibi River, and Little Missinaibi Lake.

Established in 1970 the park is huge and encompasses in total over 991 square kilometres (383 square miles) of wilderness.

While rarely visited by travellers it is well known amongst canoeing enthusiasts and is one of their "must visit" destinations.

Two main routes are available to paddlers:

1. Missinaibi River Route - stretching for 238 kilometres (144 miles) from the towns of Missinabie to Mattice

2. Mattice to Moosonee Route - This 316 kilometre (190 mile) route takes paddlers to the edge of James Bay and the near arctic.

Other activities at the park include: Hiking, fishing, camping, wildlife viewing and hunting.

== See also ==
- List of Ontario rivers
- James Bay Rivers
