= Otter Rapids =

- Community
- Location of Otter Rapids in Ontario
- Coordinates: 50°11′04″N 81°38′27″W
- Country: Canada
- Province: Ontario
- Region: Northeastern Ontario
- District: Cochrane District
- Elevation: 129 m (423 ft)
- Time zone: UTC−05:00 (EST)
  - Summer (DST): UTC−04:00 (EDT)
- FSA: P0L
- Area codes: 705, 249

Otter Rapids, also known as White Otter Rapids, is an unincorporated place and dispersed rural community in geographic Pitt Township in the unorganized north part of Cochrane District in Ontario, Canada It is located 148.9 km (92.5 mi) south of Moosonee and 120 km (75 mi) north of Smooth Rock Falls.

Situated in northeastern Ontario, the community is on the west side (left bank) of the Abitibi River adjacent to the Otter Rapids Generating Station, downstream of the Abitibi Canyon Generating Station and community of Abitibi Canyon, and upstream of Coral Rapids.

== Transportation ==
The Ontario Northland Railway runs through this community. Otter Rapids is also accessible by a gravel road that connects via Abitibi Canyon to Ontario Highway 634 at Fraserdale and by an airstrip suitable for small aircraft.

During the winter months, Wetum Road connects Otter Rapids to Moose Factory, Ontario, as a winter road.
