= Wetum Road =

Route information
- Maintained by Moose Cree First Nation Department of Public Works
- Length: 170 km (110 mi)
- Existed: 2008–present
- History: First built 2008

Major junctions
- North end: Moose Factory 68
- South end: Otter Rapids north of Abitibi Canyon

Location
- Country: Canada
- Province: Ontario
- Major cities: Moose Factory, Otter Rapids

Highway system
- Roads in Ontario

Wetum Road is a Winter road servicing the Moose Cree First Nation in Northern Ontario. The road is named for local councillors Peter Wesley (We) and Robert Echum or Robert Tum (tum).

The road is approximately 170 kilometres (110 mi) long from Otter Rapids, Ontario to Moose Factory 68 just outside Moose Factory. The south end then connects to Ontario Highway 634 in Fraserdale, Ontario to Smooth Rock Falls, Ontario where it connections to Ontario Highway 11 on to either Thunder Bay, Ontario or south to Toronto via Ontario Highway 400.

The road provides a key route to connect remote communities with areas to the south.

Maintained annually since 2013, the road's construction and use depends on the weather each winter. The unpredictable season has prompted calls to construct a year round gravel road.

Contractors are hired by Moose Cree First Nation, as the road is not part of the provincial highway system.

Coastal Winter Road runs from the opposite side of Moose Cree 68 on Moose River to Fort Albany, Kashechewan, Attawapiskat and farther west, along the Attawapiskat River.

== See also ==
- Tibbitt to Contwoyto Winter Road
