= Abitibi =

Abitibi may refer to:

== Election districts in Canada ==
- Abitibi—Témiscamingue (electoral district)
- Abitibi—Baie-James—Nunavik—Eeyou
- Abitibi (provincial electoral district)

== Places in Canada ==
- Abitibi Canyon, Ontario, community on the Abitibi River
  - Abitibi Canyon Generating Station, hydroelectric power plant
- Abitibi County, Quebec, historical county in southwestern Quebec
- Abitibi gold belt, a gold mining region spanning the border of Ontario and Quebec
- Abitibi Regional County Municipality, Quebec
- Abitibi River
- Abitibi-Ontario Band of Abitibi Indians, or Abitibi, former name of Wahgoshig First Nation
- Abitibi-Témiscamingue, administrative region in Quebec
- Lake Abitibi

== Other uses ==
- AbitibiBowater, former name of Resolute Forest Products, a pulp and paper manufacturing company
  - Abitibi-Consolidated, the company that merged with Bowater to create AbitibiBowater
- Abitibi (train), former name of the Montreal–Senneterre train in Canada
- Abitibi Eskimos, former name of the Timmins Rock, an ice hockey team in Canada
