= Sydere Creek =

- Location of the mouth of the creek in Ontario

Location
- Country: Canada
- Province: Ontario
- Region: Northeastern Ontario
- District: Cochrane
- Part or municipality: Unorganized North Cochrane District, Fauquier-Strickland

Physical characteristics
- Source: Sydere Lake
  - location: Sydere Township, Unorganized North Cochrane District
  - coordinates: 49°09′56″N 81°48′26″W
  - elevation: 268 m (879 ft)
- Mouth: Poplar Rapids River
  - location: Fauquier-Strickland
  - coordinates: 49°13′07″N 81°48′46″W
  - elevation: 227 m (745 ft)

Basin features
- River system: James Bay drainage basin

Sydere Creek is a stream in the municipality of Fauquier-Strickland and Unorganized North Cochrane District, Cochrane District in Northeastern Ontario, Canada. It is in the James Bay drainage basin and is a left tributary of the Poplar Rapids River.

== Course ==
The creek begins at a Sydere Lake in geographic Sydere Township in Unorganized North Cochrane District and flows northwest, turns northeast, passes into the municipality of Fauquier-Strickland, and reaches its mouth at the Poplar Rapids River, just short of that river's entry to the south shore of Departure Lake. The Poplar Rapids River flows via the Mattagami River and the Moose River to James Bay.
