= Strickland Creek (Ontario) =

- Location of the mouth of the creek in Ontario

Location
- Country: Canada
- Province: Ontario
- Region: Northeastern Ontario
- District: Cochrane
- Parts or municipalities: Unorganized North Cochrane District, Fauquier-Strickland

Physical characteristics
- Source: unnamed wetland
  - location: Fauquier-Strickland
  - coordinates: 49°16′11″N 81°51′22″W
  - elevation: 248 m (814 ft)
- Mouth: Poplar Rapids River
  - location: Alexandra Township, Unorganized North Cochrane District
  - coordinates: 49°21′15″N 81°50′34″W
  - elevation: 225 m (738 ft)

Basin features
- River system: James Bay drainage basin

Strickland Creek is a stream in both the municipality of Fauquier-Strickland and Unorganized North Cochrane District, Cochrane District in Northeastern Ontario, Canada. It is in the James Bay drainage basin and is a right tributary of Moonbeam Creek.

== Course ==
The creek begins at an unnamed wetland in the municipality of Fauquier-Strickland and flows northeast, then turns north, and passes under Ontario Highway 11 and the Ontario Northland Railway just east of the community of Strickland. It continues north, flows into geographic Alexandra Township in Unorganized North Cochrane District, and reaches its mouth at Moonbeam Lake. The lake flows via Moonbeam Creek, the Poplar Rapids River, the Mattagami River and the Moose River to James Bay.
