= Abitibi River =

Tributary of Moose river in northeastern Ontario, Canada

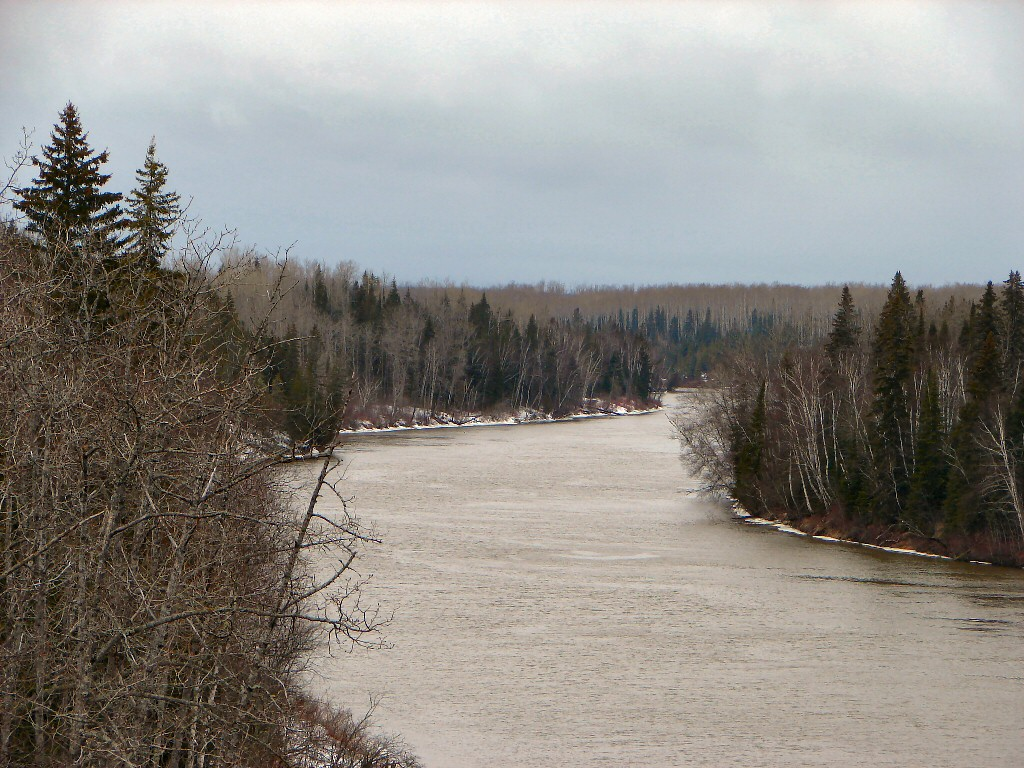
- Abitibi River at Iroquois Falls

- Location of the mouth of the Abitibi River in Ontario
- Etymology: Algonquin language

Location
- Country: Canada
- Province: Ontario
- District: Cochrane

Physical characteristics
- Source: Lake Abitibi
  - location: 38 km east of Iroquois Falls
  - coordinates: 48°47′06″N 80°10′23″W
- Mouth: Moose River
  - location: 30 km SSW from Moosonee
  - coordinates: 51°04′17″N 80°55′32″W
- Length: 540 km (340 mi)
- Basin size: 29,500 km^{2} (11,400 sq mi)

Basin features
- Tributaries
  - left: Black River, Frederick House River, North Driftwood River
  - right: Sucker River, Little Abitibi River

The Abitibi River is a river in northeastern Ontario, Canada, which flows northwest from Lake Abitibi to join the Moose River which empties into James Bay. This river is 540 kilometres (340 mi) long, and descends 265 metres (869 ft). It is the ninth longest river in Ontario, Behind the Ottawa River (1,271km), St. Lawrence River (1.197km), Severn River (982km), Albany River (982km), Winnipeg River (813km), Attawapiskat River (748km), English River (615km) and Moose River(547km).

Abitibi is an Algonquin word meaning "halfway water", derived from abitah, which may be translated as "middle" or "halfway", and nipi, "water". Originally used by the French to designate a band of Algonquin Indians who lived near the lake, the name was descriptive of their location halfway between the trading posts on the Hudson Bay and those on the Ottawa River.

The river was an important fur trading route for the Hudson's Bay Company. From 1914 Until 2014, pulp and paper, centered in the town of Iroquois Falls, was an important industry in the heavily forested region through which it flows. The region also supports tourism and gold mining.

The Abitibi Canyon Generating Station is located on the river at Abitibi Canyon. The experience of surveying the river for the purposes of building this plant was the inspiration for folk singer Wade Hemsworth's "The Black Fly Song".

== Geography ==
Description of river course (in downstream order):

- Begins as outlet from Lake Abitibi (48°47′6″N 80°10′23″W)
- Extreme southern point (48°42′26″N 80°38′25″W)
- Ansonville, Ontario (48°45′26″N 80°40′43″W)
- Iroquois Falls, Ontario (48°46′41″N 80°40′6″W)
- Crossed by Ontario Northland Railway (49°12′43″N 81°0′37″W)
- Long Sault Rapids hydroelectric plant (49°12′44″N 81°0′52″W)
- Confluence with the Black River (49°20′58″N 81°6′34″W)
- Confluence with the Frederick House River (49°18′51″N 81°16′58″W)
- Ontario Northland Railway crossing at Island Falls Station, Ontario (49°32′53″N 81°22′56″W)
- Island Falls, Ontario (49°34′3″N 81°23′16″W)
- Abitibi Canyon Generating Station near Fraserdale, Ontario (49°53′42″N 81°34′42″W)
- Otter Rapids Generating Station (50°10′57″N 81°38′37″W)
- Coral Rapids, Ontario (50°13′17″N 81°40′33″W)
- Extreme western point (50°15′25″N 81°40′48″W)
- Confluence with the Little Abitibi River (50°29′29″N 81°32′7″W)
- Joins the Moose River (51°4′17″N 80°55′32″W)
- Enters James Bay as part of the Moose River (51°21′14″N 80°24′14″W)

=== Tributaries ===
- Little Abitibi River
- Frederick House River
- Black River
- Mistango River
- Marathon Creek
- Edwards Creek
- Meadow Creek

== Protected areas ==
A small portion of the river (from the outlet of Lake Abitibi to Couchching Falls) is protected in the Abitibi-De-Troyes Provincial Park. Until April 2005, this park included all the public lands stretching along the Abitibi River to Iroquois Falls, but most of these were deregulated because the significant amount of private land within the area that made the management of the waterway class provincial park difficult.

== Power generation ==
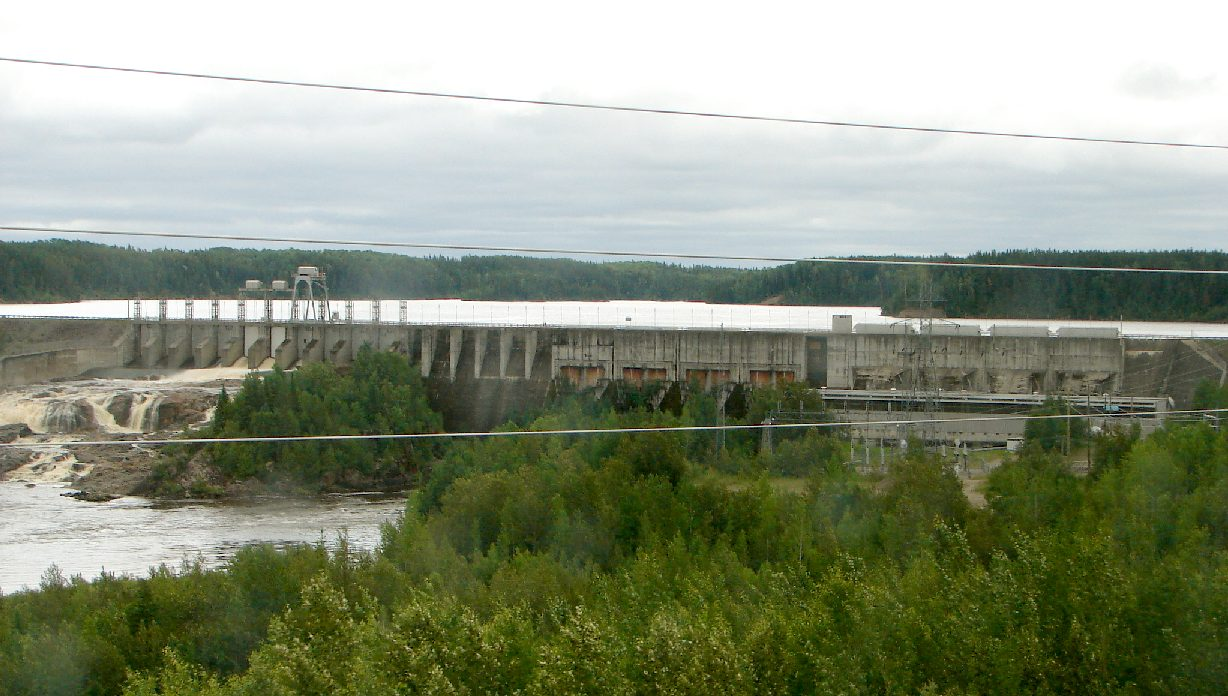
Otter Rapids Generating Station as seen from the ONR railway.

The Abitibi River is used extensively for the hydro-electric power generation. Power stations on the river are in downstream order:

Installation	Capacity	Head	Year built	Operator	Notes
Twin Falls	27.5 MW	17 m (56 ft)	1922	H2O Power	5 vertical Francis turbines
Iroquois Falls	29.7 MW	13 m (43 ft)	1914 (rebuilt 2003)	H2O Power	9 vertical Saxo Kaplan, 3 horizontal double Francis turbines
Long Sault Rapids	16 MW	9 m (30 ft)	1998	Algonquin Power Systems	Run-of-the-river
Island Falls	44.3 MW	19 m (62 ft)	1925	H2O Power	4 vertical Francis turbines
Abitibi Canyon	345 MW		1933	Ontario Power Generation	5x 68.8 MW Francis turbines
Peter Sutherland Sr.	28 MW		2017	Ontario Power Generation	actually on New Post Creek
Otter Rapids	180 MW		1961	Ontario Power Generation	4x 45 MW turbines

== See also ==
- List of Ontario rivers
