= Blackfly (film) =

- Directed by: Christopher Hinton
- Produced by: William Pettigrew
- Cinematography: Raymond Dumas; Pierre Landry; Lynda Pelley
- Edited by: Christopher Hinton
- Music by: Wade Hemsworth
- Distributed by: National Film Board of Canada
- Release date: 1991 (Canada)
- Running time: 5 minutes
- Country: Canada
- Language: English

Blackfly is a 1991 Canadian animated short from Christopher Hinton, produced by the National Film Board of Canada and based on "The Black Fly Song" by Wade Hemsworth. It was nominated for an Academy Award and Genie Award for Best Animated Short. The version of the song used in the film features back-up vocals from Kate & Anna McGarrigle.

== Synopsis ==
The film follows the general plot established by the lyrics of the song, though the film embellishes this plot with fantastical comic elements, such as recurring depictions of blackflies in human situations.

As in the song, the animation depicts blackflies tormenting a man who is working for a survey crew at the Little Abitibi River, or what is now known as Little Abitibi Provincial Park. Expanding on the original lyrics, the film depicts the blackflies chasing the man all the way to the moon.

== See also ==
- The Log Driver's Waltz, an earlier NFB film also covering a Wade Hemsworth song
