= Moonbeam Lake (Cochrane District) =

Lake in Cochrane District, Ontario, Canada

- Location in Ontario
- Location: Cochrane District, Ontario
- Coordinates: 49°21′52″N 81°49′54″W
- Part of: James Bay drainage basin
- Primary inflows: Moonbeam Creek, Strickland Creek
- Primary outflows: Moonbeam Creek
- Basin countries: Canada
- Max. length: 2.5 km (1.6 mi)
- Max. width: 1.0 km (0.62 mi)
- Surface elevation: 225 m (738 ft)

Moonbeam Lake is a lake in geographic Alexandra Township in Unorganized North Cochrane District, Cochrane District, in Northeastern Ontario, Canada. It is in the James Bay drainage basin.

The primary inflows are Moonbeam Creek, at the southwest, and Strickland Creek, at the south. The primary outflow, at the north, is Moonbeam Creek, which flows via the Poplar Rapids River, the Mattagami River and the Moose River to James Bay.

== See also ==
- List of lakes in Ontario
