= Haggart Lake =

Haggart Lake may refer to one of several lakes in Ontario, Canada:

- Haggart Lake (Cochrane District), in the James Bay drainage basin
- Haggart Lake (Kenora District), in the Hudson Bay drainage basin
- Haggart Lake (Muskoka District), in the Great Lakes Basin
