= Sydere Lake =

Lake in Cochrane District, Ontario, Canada

- Location in Ontario
- Location: Cochrane District, Ontario
- Coordinates: 49°09′50″N 81°48′19″W
- Part of: James Bay drainage basin
- Primary outflows: Sydere Creek
- Basin countries: Canada
- Max. length: 510 m (1,670 ft)
- Max. width: 310 m (1,020 ft)
- Surface elevation: 268 m (879 ft)

Sydere Lake is a lake in geographic Sydere Township in Unorganized North Cochrane District, Cochrane District, in Northeastern Ontario, Canada. It is in the James Bay drainage basin and is the source of Sydere Creek.

The primary outflow, at the north, is Sydere Creek, which flows via the Poplar Rapids River, the Mattagami River and the Moose River to James Bay.

== See also ==
- List of lakes in Ontario
