= Abitibi Canyon =

Community in Ontario, Canada

Coordinates: 49°52′40″N 81°34′15″W

Abitibi Canyon was a community on the Abitibi River in northeastern Ontario, Canada. It was part of Northern Unorganized Cochrane District, in Cochrane District. It was located 4.0 kilometres (2.5 mi) northeast of Fraserdale. Abitibi Canyon was established in 1930 by the Ontario Power Service Corporation to house workers building the Abitibi Canyon Generating Station.

== History ==
The construction of the Abitibi Canyon Generating Station at Abitibi Canyon began in 1930 for the Ontario Power Service Corporation, a subsidiary of the Abitibi Power and Paper Company, today's Resolute Forest Products. Work was suspended several years later, the company went into receivership and the project was taken over by the provincial Ontario Hydro in 1933.

The Abitibi Canyon settlement was established in 1930 to support the construction of the dam. In early years, construction and later support staff came by Ontario Northland Railway train to Fraserdale, then further by private siding, or used floatplanes. In 1966, a road connection via Fraserdale to Smooth Rock Falls, Ontario was built, designated today as Highway 634. In the early 1960s Ontario Hydro released a documentary, Call of the Canyon, about the community and the construction of this road.

In 1940s, 130 people lived in the Ontario Hydro settlement, which rose to 300 by 1982. However, in 1980, Ontario Hydro decided to close the community as a cost-saving measure.

== Climate ==
Island Falls is a weather station located approximately 36 km (22.4 miles) to the south of Abitibi Canyon. Island Falls has a humid continental climate (Köppen Dfb) bordering on a subarctic climate (Köppen Dfc).

Climate data for Island Falls, Ontario (1981-2010): 213m
Month	Jan	Feb	Mar	Apr	May	Jun	Jul	Aug	Sep	Oct	Nov	Dec	Year
Record high °C (°F)	6.7 (44.1)	11.0 (51.8)	18.9 (66.0)	26.5 (79.7)	33.0 (91.4)	39.0 (102.2)	36.7 (98.1)	35.0 (95.0)	31.5 (88.7)	25.6 (78.1)	19.4 (66.9)	13.5 (56.3)	39.0 (102.2)
Mean daily maximum °C (°F)	−12.5 (9.5)	−9.0 (15.8)	−2.1 (28.2)	6.2 (43.2)	14.9 (58.8)	20.6 (69.1)	23.3 (73.9)	21.7 (71.1)	15.3 (59.5)	7.7 (45.9)	−1.0 (30.2)	−8.8 (16.2)	6.4 (43.4)
Daily mean °C (°F)	−19.4 (−2.9)	−16.8 (1.8)	−9.3 (15.3)	−0.1 (31.8)	8.4 (47.1)	14.4 (57.9)	17.5 (63.5)	16.3 (61.3)	10.8 (51.4)	4.0 (39.2)	−4.5 (23.9)	−14.1 (6.6)	0.6 (33.1)
Mean daily minimum °C (°F)	−26.2 (−15.2)	−24.5 (−12.1)	−16.5 (2.3)	−6.5 (20.3)	1.9 (35.4)	8.1 (46.6)	11.6 (52.9)	10.8 (51.4)	6.3 (43.3)	0.4 (32.7)	−8.0 (17.6)	−19.3 (−2.7)	−5.2 (22.7)
Record low °C (°F)	−47.0 (−52.6)	−47.2 (−53.0)	−42.8 (−45.0)	−33.3 (−27.9)	−12.2 (10.0)	−3.3 (26.1)	−1.7 (28.9)	−1.1 (30.0)	−5.0 (23.0)	−12.5 (9.5)	−31.7 (−25.1)	−45.0 (−49.0)	−47.2 (−53.0)
Average precipitation mm (inches)	57.1 (2.25)	41.1 (1.62)	40.6 (1.60)	47.3 (1.86)	57.7 (2.27)	76.8 (3.02)	115.5 (4.55)	74.8 (2.94)	101.0 (3.98)	89.4 (3.52)	71.6 (2.82)	68.9 (2.71)	841.8 (33.14)
Average snowfall cm (inches)	56.9 (22.4)	38.9 (15.3)	31.4 (12.4)	21.3 (8.4)	3.7 (1.5)	0.2 (0.1)	0.0 (0.0)	0.0 (0.0)	0.4 (0.2)	14.8 (5.8)	49.8 (19.6)	64.3 (25.3)	281.7 (111)
Average precipitation days (≥ 0.2 mm)	14.0	10.3	9.8	9.6	11.6	13.4	15.8	13.3	17.7	17.1	15.3	16.7	164.6
Average snowy days (≥ 0.2 cm)	14.0	9.7	8.0	5.1	1.1	0.1	0.0	0.0	0.2	3.9	11.6	16.3	70
Source: Environment Canada
