= Moonbeam Creek (Cochrane District) =

- Location of the mouth of the creek in Ontario

Location
- Country: Canada
- Province: Ontario
- Region: Northeastern Ontario
- District: Cochrane
- Parts or municipalities: Unorganized North Cochrane District, Fauquier-Strickland

Physical characteristics
- Source: unnamed wetland
  - location: Fauquier-Strickland
  - coordinates: 49°14′53″N 81°52′52″W
  - elevation: 250 m (820 ft)
- Mouth: Poplar Rapids River
  - location: Alexandra Township, Unorganized North Cochrane District
  - coordinates: 49°23′42″N 81°47′59″W
  - elevation: 211 m (692 ft)

Basin features
- River system: James Bay drainage basin
- Tributaries
  - right: Strickland Creek

Moonbeam Creek is a stream in both the municipality of Fauquier-Strickland and Unorganized North Cochrane District, Cochrane District in Northeastern Ontario, Canada. It is in the James Bay drainage basin and is a left tributary of the Poplar Rapids River.

== Course ==
The creek begins at an unnamed wetland in the municipality of Fauquier-Strickland and flows north, passes under Ontario Highway 11 and the Ontario Northland Railway just west of the community of Strickland, and flows into geographic Alexandra Township in Unorganized North Cochrane District. It continues northeast, takes in the right tributary Strickland Creek at Moonbeam Lake, loops south then back north, and reaches its mouth at the Poplar Rapids River. The Poplar Rapids River flows via the Mattagami River and the Moose River to James Bay.
