= Little Abitibi River =

Location
- Country: Canada
- Province: Ontario

Physical characteristics
- Source
  - coordinates: 49°16′43″N 80°18′45″W
  - elevation: 355 m
- Mouth
  - location: Abitibi River
  - coordinates: 50°29′10″N 81°31′28″W
  - elevation: 41 m
- Length: 120 km (75 mi)

The Little Abitibi River is a river in northern Ontario. Beginning as the outlet of an unnamed lake, it flows northwestward to join the Abitibi River, passing through several larger lakes, including Little Abitibi Lake and Pierre Lake. It falls into the Abitibi below the Otter Rapids Generating Station, having completed a course of about 120 kilometres (75 mi).

The river was made famous in "The Blackfly Song", which concerns the construction of a dam on the Little Abitibi (or "Little Ab").

== See also ==
- Little Abitibi Provincial Park
- List of rivers of Ontario
