= Departure Lake, Ontario =

Departure Lake
- Dispersed rural community
- Location in Ontario
- Coordinates: 49°17′16″N 81°47′52″W
- Country: Canada
- Province: Ontario
- District: Cochrane
- Part: Unorganized North Cochrane District
- Elevation: 233 m (764 ft)
- Time zone: UTC-5 (Eastern Time Zone)
  - Summer (DST): UTC-4 (Eastern Time Zone)
- Area codes: 705, 249

Departure Lake is a dispersed rural community and unincorporated place in geographic Haggart Township, Cochrane District in Northeastern Ontario, Canada. It is located on Ontario Highway 11 between the communities of Strickland to the west and Smooth Rock Falls to the east.

The community is counted as part of Unorganized North Cochrane District in Canadian census data.

The mouth of Haggart Creek at the Poplar Rapids River is southeast of the community, and the Poplar Rapids River itself passes under Highway 11 and the Ontario Northland Railway just east of the community. Departure Lake, a lake on the Poplar Rapids River, is 2.8 kilometres (1.7 mi) south of the community at the end of North Access Road, where there is a picnic area.
