= Moosonee =

- Town (single-tier)
- Town of Moosonee
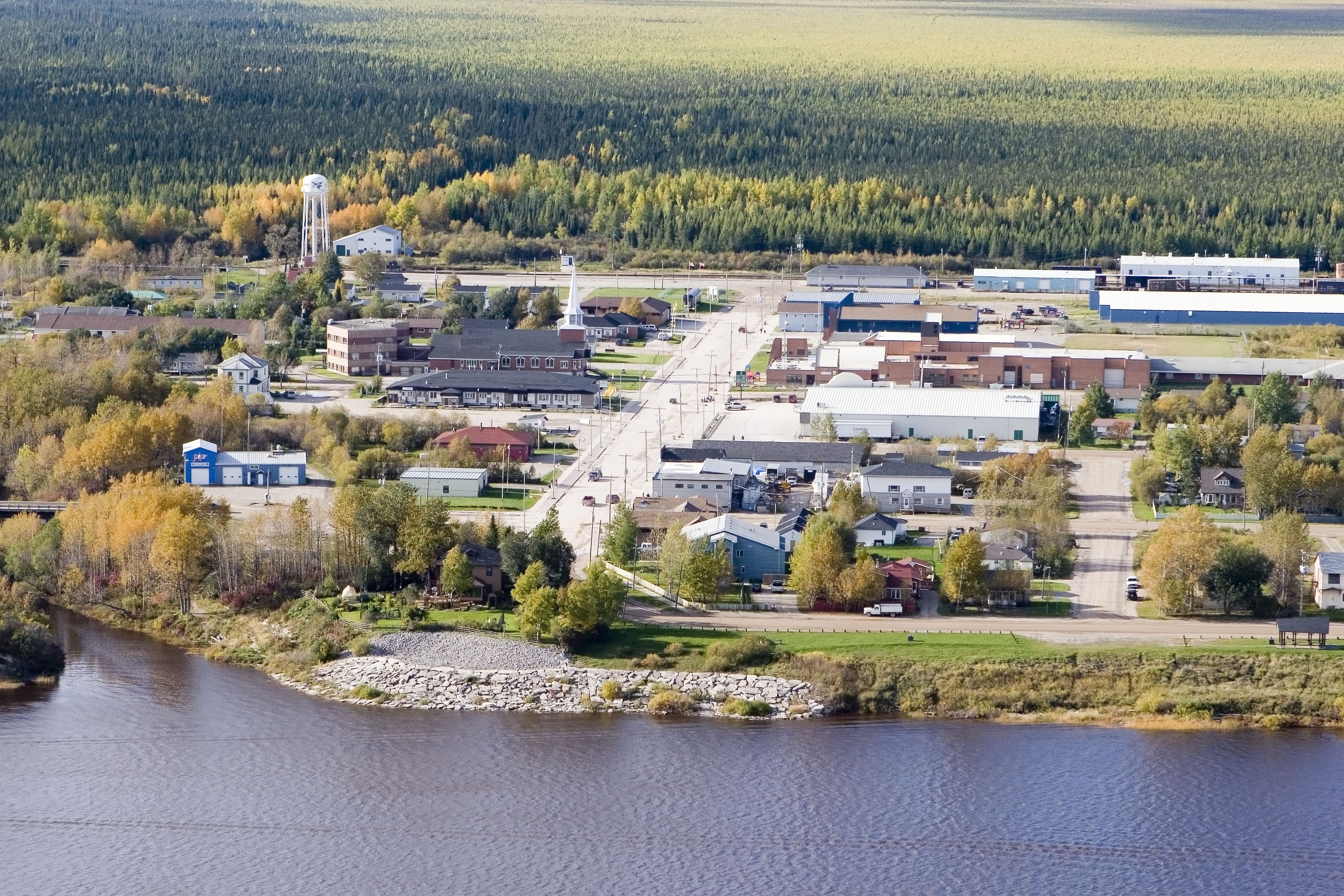

- Location within Ontario
- Coordinates: 51°20′03″N 80°43′16″W
- Country: Canada
- Province: Ontario
- Region: Northeastern Ontario
- District: Cochrane
- Settled: 1903
- Incorporated: 2001

Government
  - Mayor: Wayne Taipale
  - MP: Gaétan Malette (Conservative)
  - MPP: Guy Bourgouin (ONDP)

Area (2021)
  - Land: 547.83 km^{2} (211.52 sq mi)
  - Urban: 1.64 km^{2} (0.63 sq mi)

Population (2021)
  - Total: 1,512
  - Density: 2.8/km^{2} (7.3/sq mi)
  - Urban: 1,471
  - Urban density: 898.8/km^{2} (2,328/sq mi)
- Time zone: UTC−05:00 (EST)
  - Summer (DST): UTC−04:00 (EDT)
- Postal code: P0L 1Y0
- Area code: 705
- Website: www.moosonee.ca

Moosonee (/ˌmuːsəˈniː/) is a town in Northeastern Ontario, Canada, on the Moose River. It is considered to be "the Gateway to the Arctic" and has Ontario's only saltwater port. Nearby, on Moose Factory Island, is the older community of Moose Factory to which it is connected by water taxi in the summer and ice road in the winter.

There is no road connection to the community but flights are provided by Air Creebec, North Star Air and Thunder Airlines via Moosonee Airport. Moosonee is also the railhead of the Polar Bear Express, a combined passenger and freight train operated by Ontario Northland Railway. In Moosonee, goods are transferred to barges and aircraft for transport to more northerly communities. The community was the site of a fur trading post set up in 1903 by Revillon Frères, competitors to the Hudson's Bay Company, which later bought out Revillon.

Moosonee formerly held the status of a development area, the only community in the province with that designation, and was governed by a locally-elected board subject to formal appointment by the Ontario provincial government. It became incorporated as a town effective 1 January 2001, with an elected mayor and four-person council.

== History ==
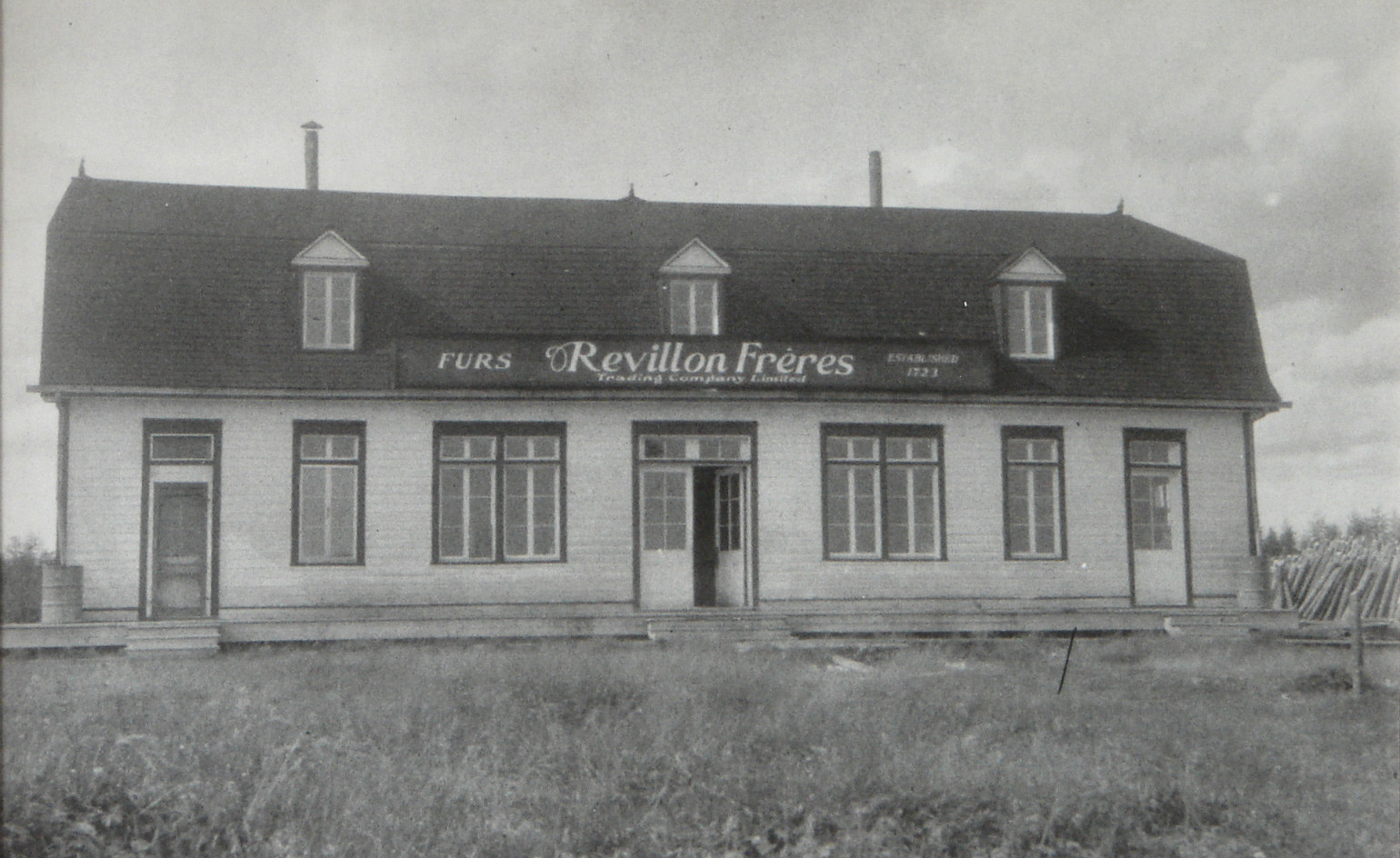
Revillon Frères store in Moosonee

In 1900, Annie Hardisty and her two daughters were the first settlers on the site. Significant development began on 6 June 1903, four canoes and a crew of 21 persons of the Revillon Frères company arrived on the banks of the Moose River near the much older Moose Factory to establish the Moose River Post. This Parisian furrier had ambitious plans to set up a chain of fur trading posts in direct competition with the Hudson's Bay Company, including five on James Bay. But it suffered a setback when their supply ship that carried all the provisions shipwrecked near Fort George (Chisasibi). The Revillon Frères Museum is located on First Street.

Moose River Post became the most important location for Revillon Frères and was quickly expanded with a staff house, carpenter's shop, warehouse, and sawmill. The buildings were spaced far apart as a preventive measure to minimize the spread of fire. By 1912, it was reported that "the whole line of good substantial buildings, built principally for their French Canadian employees, stretches along the river front for nearly a mile northward from the residence of the inspector."

Moose River Post (and Moose Factory) were prosperous but isolated. It was supplied only once per year by ship coming from Montreal around the Labrador Peninsula. Mail arrived only four times per year, twice by canoe and twice by toboggan. During World War I, Revillon Frères' chartered supply ship was requisitioned for war service. So from then on until 1932, the post was supplied by scows from Pagwa on the National Transcontinental Railway coming down the Pagwachuan, Kenogami, and Albany Rivers.

In 1932, the Temiskaming and Northern Ontario Railway was extended from Cochrane to Moose River Post, that was renamed at that time to Moosonee, derived from the Cree word môsonihk meaning "at the Moose [River]". In 1936, Revillon Frères sold its Canadian operations to the Hudson's Bay Company and the Moosonee post closed. The HBC also exited the fur trade and opened a retail store in Moosonee (now Northern Store, part of The North West Company). With the end of the fur trade business, Moosonee's economy became centred on transportation.

In 1962, Moosonee became the site of RCAF Station Moosonee that was part of NORAD's Pinetree Line chain of radar stations. It closed in 1975 and some of its buildings were used by the Town after the closure, including the base swimming pool and recreation centre.

In 1968, the town was classified as a development area board. In November 2000, it was incorporated as the Town of Moosonee.

The town is governed by a mayor and four councillors. As of 2023, the mayor is Wayne Taipale and the councillors are Theresa Chavez, Sheldon Ross, Diane Ryder, and Carman Tozer.

== Geography ==
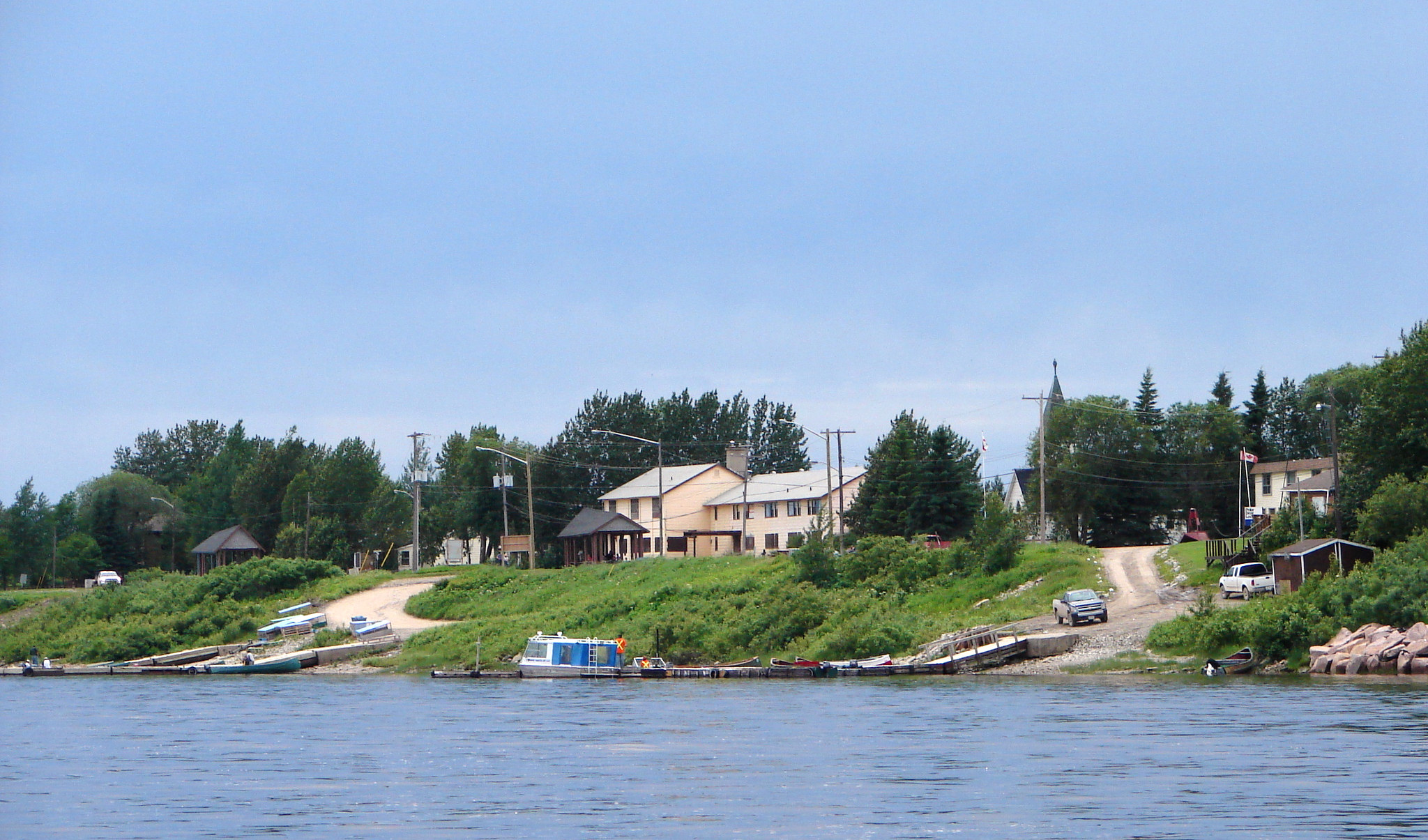
Moosonee waterfront along the Moose River

Moosonee is located near the mouth of the Moose River, approximately 19 km (12 mi) south of James Bay. It is not particularly far north, being located at 51°N, roughly the same latitude as Saskatoon and Calgary, but is colder because of its proximity to Hudson Bay and isolated by its lack of road access to the rest of Ontario.

=== Climate ===
Moosonee has a humid continental climate (Köppen climate classification Dfb) with subarctic influences, which gives the town warm summers and cold winters that are sometimes severe. James Bay acts as a thermal reservoir to moderate spring and fall temperatures. Freeze-up on the Moose River normally occurs between late November and mid-December, with mean daily minimum January temperatures approximately −25 °C (−13 °F). Spring break-up, or spring thaw, usually occurs in April. Mean annual precipitation is 703.6 mm (27.70 in), and mean annual snowfall is 226.8 cm (89.3 in). Precipitation is somewhat higher in summer than at other times of the year. Severe thunderstorms can occur from time to time. Moosonee used to have a subarctic climate with a yearly mean temperature of −1.3 °C (29.7 °F), but due to global warming that temperature has risen to 0.1 °C (32.2 °F).

The highest temperature ever recorded in Moosonee was 37.8 °C (100.0 °F) on 31 July 1975. The coldest temperature ever recorded, at (Moose Factory), was −48.9 °C (−56.0 °F) on 24 January 1935.

Climate data for Moosonee (Moosonee Upper Air (UA)) WMO ID: 71836; coordinates 51°16′N 80°39′W; elevation: 10.0 m (32.8 ft); 1991–2020 normals, extremes 1877–present (Note: Long term climate data for the Moosonee area was recorded in Moose Factory from October 1877 to December 1938, and in Moosonee from October 1932 to present.)
Month	Jan	Feb	Mar	Apr	May	Jun	Jul	Aug	Sep	Oct	Nov	Dec	Year
Record high °C (°F)	7.2 (45.0)	10.6 (51.1)	24.5 (76.1)	27.9 (82.2)	34.2 (93.6)	37.1 (98.8)	37.8 (100.0)	35.0 (95.0)	36.3 (97.3)	30.0 (86.0)	20.5 (68.9)	13.2 (55.8)	37.8 (100.0)
Mean daily maximum °C (°F)	−13.0 (8.6)	−10.8 (12.6)	−4.0 (24.8)	3.8 (38.8)	12.7 (54.9)	19.8 (67.6)	22.9 (73.2)	21.6 (70.9)	16.9 (62.4)	8.9 (48.0)	0.1 (32.2)	−8.8 (16.2)	5.8 (42.4)
Daily mean °C (°F)	−18.7 (−1.7)	−17.4 (0.7)	−11.0 (12.2)	−2.2 (28.0)	6.4 (43.5)	12.7 (54.9)	16.3 (61.3)	15.5 (59.9)	11.3 (52.3)	4.9 (40.8)	−3.6 (25.5)	−13.5 (7.7)	0.1 (32.2)
Mean daily minimum °C (°F)	−24.4 (−11.9)	−23.9 (−11.0)	−18.0 (−0.4)	−8.1 (17.4)	0.1 (32.2)	5.7 (42.3)	9.8 (49.6)	9.4 (48.9)	5.8 (42.4)	0.6 (33.1)	−7.5 (18.5)	−18.2 (−0.8)	−5.7 (21.7)
Record low °C (°F)	−48.9 (−56.0)	−47.8 (−54.0)	−44.4 (−47.9)	−33.9 (−29.0)	−17.8 (0.0)	−7.0 (19.4)	−2.2 (28.0)	−3.1 (26.4)	−6.1 (21.0)	−16.7 (1.9)	−34.4 (−29.9)	−44.4 (−47.9)	−48.9 (−56.0)
Average precipitation mm (inches)	34.8 (1.37)	31.1 (1.22)	33.0 (1.30)	37.1 (1.46)	65.9 (2.59)	68.1 (2.68)	90.0 (3.54)	80.4 (3.17)	90.5 (3.56)	71.6 (2.82)	53.7 (2.11)	43.6 (1.72)	699.7 (27.55)
Average rainfall mm (inches)	1.0 (0.04)	1.0 (0.04)	3.9 (0.15)	19.6 (0.77)	58.9 (2.32)	67.1 (2.64)	90.3 (3.56)	80.4 (3.17)	89.9 (3.54)	66.2 (2.61)	20.6 (0.81)	3.7 (0.15)	502.8 (19.80)
Average snowfall cm (inches)	35.9 (14.1)	32.7 (12.9)	30.4 (12.0)	15.8 (6.2)	3.4 (1.3)	0.0 (0.0)	0.0 (0.0)	0.0 (0.0)	0.4 (0.2)	6.5 (2.6)	37.9 (14.9)	48.5 (19.1)	211.4 (83.2)
Average precipitation days (≥ 0.2 mm)	13.2	11.0	8.8	9.7	13.2	12.4	16.2	16.2	17.1	16.6	15.4	15.3	165.1
Average rainy days (≥ 0.2 mm)	0.52	0.38	1.4	4.6	12.2	12.4	16.2	16.4	17.1	14.6	5.2	1.2	102.1
Average snowy days (≥ 0.2 cm)	11.9	9.6	7.6	5.7	1.9	0.04	0.0	0.0	0.05	3.1	11.3	13.6	64.7
Average relative humidity (%) (at 1500 LST)	71.9	64.9	59.5	59.7	60.7	59.1	61.6	63.6	65.3	69.3	76.1	77.9	65.8
Mean monthly sunshine hours	93.6	128.7	161.6	192.0	221.2	213.5	249.2	219.7	134.8	88.5	52.9	55.2	1,810.7
Percentage possible sunshine	35.8	45.7	44.0	46.3	45.9	43.1	50.0	48.6	35.4	26.6	19.7	22.3	38.6
Source: Environment and Climate Change Canada (sun 1981–2010)

== Demographics ==
In the 2021 Canadian census conducted by Statistics Canada, Moosonee had a population of 1,512 living in 487 of its 629 total private dwellings, a change of 2.1% from its 2016 population of 1,481. With a land area of 547.83 km^{2} (211.52 sq mi), it had a population density of 2.8/km^{2} (7.1/sq mi) in 2021.

In 2021, 86.0 per cent of residents spoke English as their mother tongue, 8.5 per cent Indigenous (mainly Cree), 1.0 per cent French, and 4.4 per cent other languages. The population are mainly First Nations (66.8 per cent), 32.5 per cent non-indigenous and 1 per cent Métis.

Canada census – Moosonee community profile

	2021	2016	2011
Population	1,512 (+2.1% from 2016)	1,481 (-14.1% from 2011)	1,725 (-14.0% from 2006)
Land area	547.83 km^{2} (211.52 sq mi)	546.72 km^{2} (211.09 sq mi)	550.12 km^{2} (212.40 sq mi)
Population density	2.8/km^{2} (7.3/sq mi)	2.7/km^{2} (7.0/sq mi)	3.1/km^{2} (8.0/sq mi)
Median age	29.8 (M: 28.8, F: 30.6)	28.1 (M: 26.9, F: 29.1)	27.6 (M: 27.2, F: 27.9)
Private dwellings	629 (total) 487 (occupied)	633 (total)	635 (total)
Median household income	$94,000	$73,370

References: 2021 2016 2011

Historical census populations – Moosonee

Year	Pop.	±%
1986	1,319	—
1991	1,213	−8.0%
1996	1,939	+59.9%
2001	1,916	−1.2%

Year	Pop.	±%
2006	2,006	+4.7%
2011	1,725	−14.0%
2016	1,481	−14.1%
2021	1,512	+2.1%

Population figures based on revised counts. Population counts are not adjusted for boundary changes.
Source: Statistics Canada

== Attractions and tourism ==
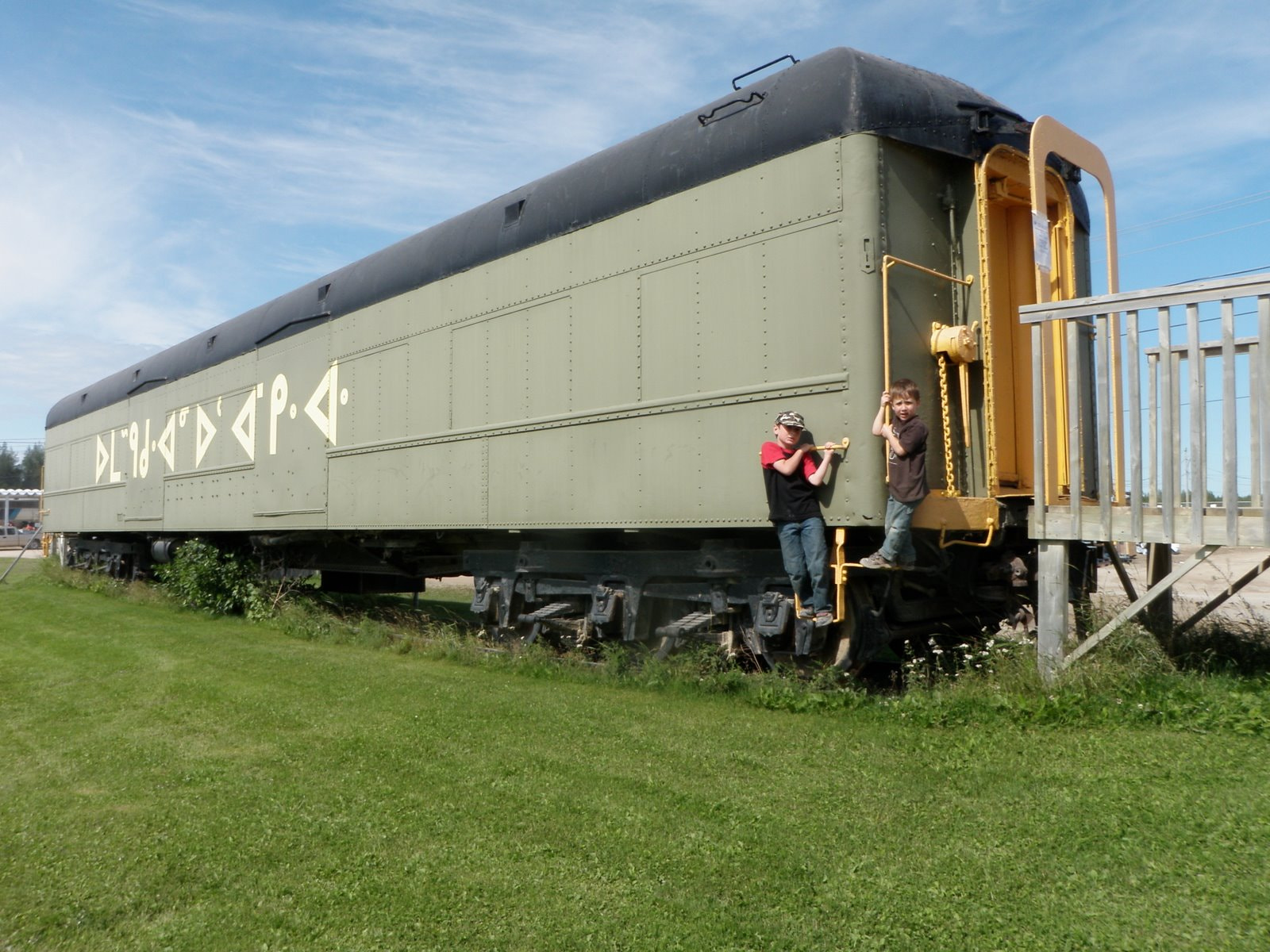
Railway Car Museum

Tourism agencies recommend the Polar Bear Express as a "great rail excursion" in summer, between Cochrane and Moosonee, to view the "hydroelectric dams, isolated homes and perhaps even some wildlife."

A private company offers freighter-canoe ferry across the Moose River to Moose Factory where Centennial Park exhibits 19th-century buildings from the fur-trading era.

Notable attractions in Moosonee include:

- Railway Car Museum – displaying the cultural history of the area in an old Baggage Car of the Temiskaming & Northern Ontario Railway.
- MNR Interpretive Centre – displays and videos at the office of the Ministry of Natural Resources highlighting the wildlife, geological, and geographical features of the region.
- Excursions to the bird sanctuaries of Shipsands Island and the Southern James Bay.

The Tidewater Provincial Park is on nearby Charles Island, adjacent to Moose Factory Island.

Christ the King Basilica is a Roman Catholic minor basilica that served as the cathedral of the Diocese of Moosonee (1936–2018).

== Services ==
Moosonee has two elementary schools, Moosonee Public School and Bishop Belleau Separate School (Roman Catholic) that offer kindergarten through grade eight. Bishop Belleau School also provides a French Language Instructional Unit for children who are entitled to be educated in French. There is a public high school, Northern Lights Secondary School, that provides grades nine through twelve. Northern College's Moosonee campus provides some post-secondary programs.

Health services are provided through the Moosonee Health Clinic of the Weeneebayko Area Health Authority (merger of the former James Bay General Hospital and the Weeneebayko Health Ahtuskaywin, which operated Weeneebayko General Hospital in Moose Factory).

Payukotayno (pronounced pay-k-ta-no) Family Services provide child care and social assistance to Moosonee, Moose Factory, Attawapiskat First Nation, Fort Albany First Nation, Kashechewan First Nation and Peawanuck. Payukotayno is a recognized Ontario Children's Aid society and means 'one family' in Cree.

As of 2020 a "satellite Trades Centre" was being operated in the community by Northern College "linked to the ... Timmins Campus"; courses included technology, trades and apprenticeship programs.

== Transportation ==
The town is billed as "a major transportation hub for Ontario's Far North".

As of 2020, the MV Niska 1 ferry was operating between Moosonee and Moose Factory island, carrying passengers and vehicles.

=== Moosonee station and yard ===
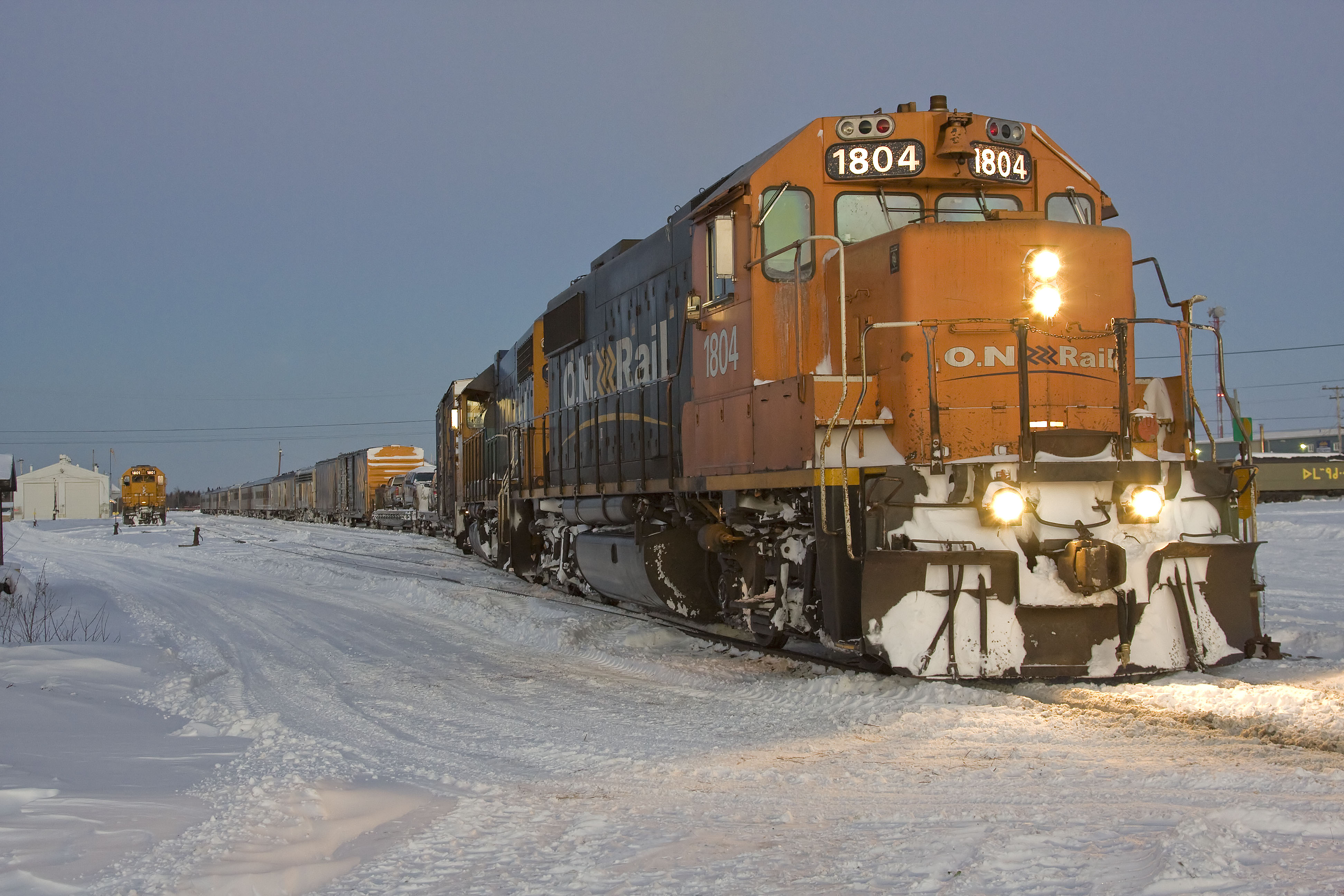
The Polar Bear Express at Moosonee Station

The main method of access is by Ontario Northland Railway, which reached the town in 1932 and provides passenger and freight train service to Cochrane. Ontario Northland's Polar Bear Express train runs from Moosonee station to Cochrane station six days per week during the summer months and five days per week during the rest of the year. Moosonee station is located at the end of First Street and has a small station building, freight shed, diesel shed and an outdoor yard to store trains. Tickets are sold by phone or at the offices Cochrane, Moosonee, Moose Factory and Timmins. The train will stop on demand in some locations as part of the flag stop service.

There are also two freight trains per week. During the summer and early fall shipping season, goods can be transported from Moosonee by barge. In January 2007, responsibility for the Port of Moosonee was transferred from the federal government to the Town of Moosonee. The Polar Bear Express Passenger Train transports cars, canoes, ATVs, and snowmobiles as long as they are booked in advance notice. It is one of only two motorail services in North America.

=== Airport ===
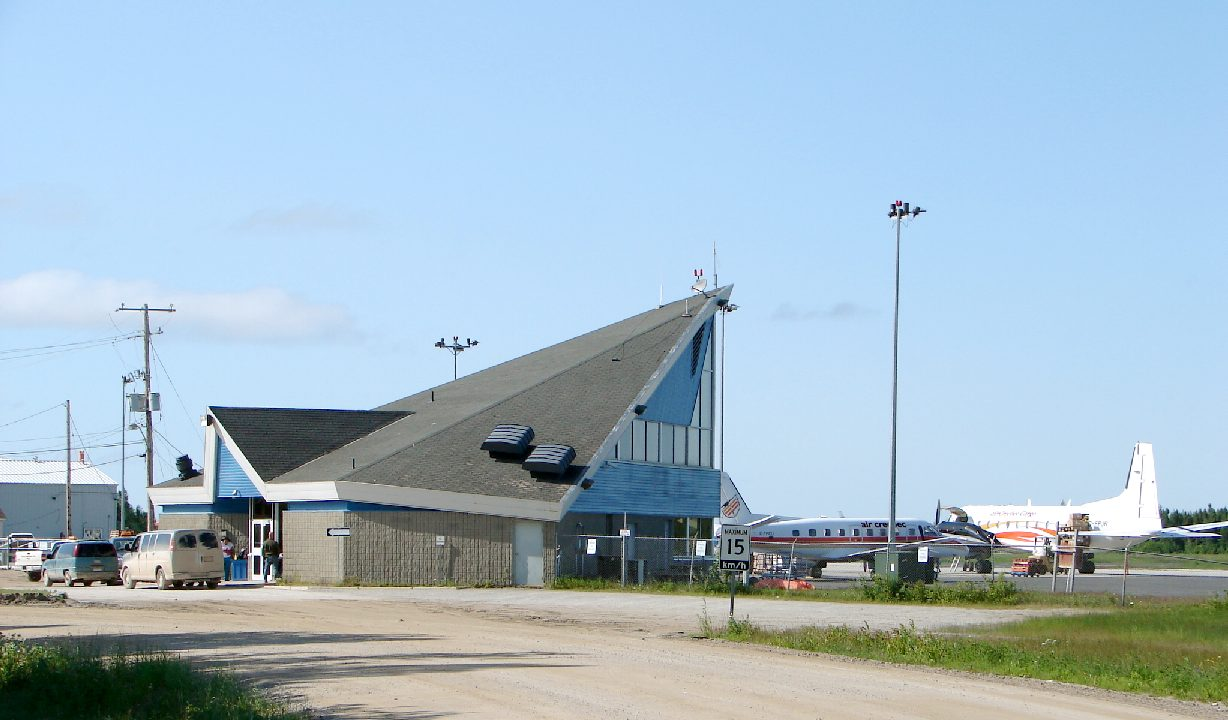
Moosonee Airport

The town is also accessible via the Moosonee Airport, served with scheduled flights by Air Creebec, and Thunder Airlines, and cargo service through North Star Air. In the summer months floatplanes can land at Moosonee Water Aerodrome

=== Roads ===
Moosonee is inaccessible by road. The nearest road outside of Moosonee ends at Otter Rapids, 148.9 km (92.5 mi) south of Moosonee. During the early months of 2008, a winter road was open between Moosonee and the provincial road system at Otter Rapids. This road was built to support the twinning of the electric transmission lines that run from Otter Rapids to Moosonee. Local residents report it taking five or six hours to get to Timmins from Moosonee via Otter Rapids and Smooth Rock Falls. This road was not in service in 2009. In late 2009, members of the Moose Cree First Nation voted for the construction of a seasonal winter road south to Otter Rapids.

During the winter, ice roads are plowed and maintained on the ice across the Moose River to Moose Factory and winter roads are maintained to the coastal First Nations communities of Fort Albany, Kashechewan and Attawapiskat. In recent years, much of the traffic heading up north has been destined for the Victor Diamond Mine operated by De Beers Canada to the west of Attawapiskat.

In January 2021, the 311 km (193 mi) James Bay Winter Ice Road was under construction, to connect Attawapiskat, Kashechewan, Fort Albany and Moosonee. It opened some time in winter 2021 and was said to accept loads up to 50,000 kilograms in weight. The road was operated by Kimesskanemenow LP, "a limited partnership between the four communities it connects".

Feasibility studies have been undertaken on the construction of a permanent all-season road to the communities of Moosonee, Fort Albany, Kashechewan and Attawapiskat River. The project, if undertaken, will entail a "coastal road" connecting the four communities with each other, as well as a road to link the coastal road to the provincial highway system at Fraserdale, Kapuskasing or Hearst.

== Communications ==
Moosonee has a local radio station, CHMO 1450 AM, that is generally operated by volunteers, plus a rebroadcasting facility for CBC Radio One Northern Ontario from CBCS-FM Sudbury on 1340 AM. Most homes subscribe to either Creecable cable TV or a satellite TV service to receive their programming, following the 2012 closure of the local CBC Television and TVOntario repeaters.

Ontera, formerly Ontario Northland Telecommunications, but now owned by Bell, provides telecommunications service in Moosonee (NPA-NXX 705-336).
