= Haggart Lake (Cochrane District) =

- Location in Ontario
- Location: Cochrane District, Ontario
- Coordinates: 49°13′18″N 81°43′28″W
- Type: lake
- Part of: James Bay drainage basin
- Primary inflows: Haggart Creek
- Primary outflows: Haggart Creek
- Basin countries: Canada
- Max. length: 220 m (720 ft)
- Max. width: 80 m (260 ft)
- Surface elevation: 242 m (794 ft)

Haggart Lake is a lake in geographic Haggart Township, Cochrane District in Northeastern Ontario, Canada. It is in the James Bay drainage basin.

The primary inflow, at the south, and outflow, at the north, is Haggart Creek. Haggart Creek flows via the Poplar Rapids River, the Mattagami River and the Moose River to James Bay.

== See also ==
- List of lakes in Ontario
