= Otter Rapids Generating Station =

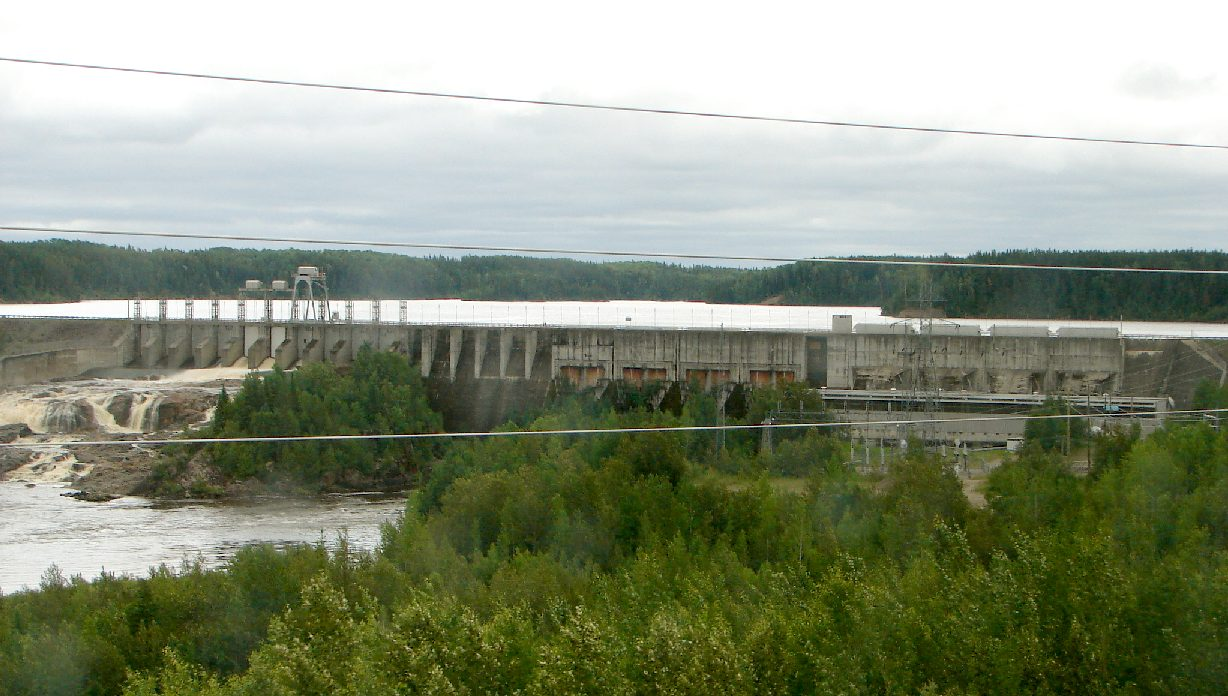
- Otter Rapids Dam and Generating Station as seen from the Ontario Northland Railway

- Location of Otter Rapids Generating Station in Ontario
- Country: Canada
- Location: Cochrane District, Ontario
- Coordinates: 50°11′01″N 81°38′10″W
- Status: Operational
- Opening date: September 26, 1961
- Owner: Ontario Power Generation

Dam and spillways
- Type of dam: Embankment dam
- Spillways: 1
- Spillway type: Controlled chute

Power Station
- Turbines: 4 x 46 MVA, 60 Hz, 138.4 RPM
- Installed capacity: 182 MW
- Website www.opg.com/generating-power/hydro/northeast-ontario/Pages/otter-rapids-station.aspx

Otter Rapids Generating Station is a dam and hydroelectric power plant on the Abitibi River in Northeastern Ontario's Cochrane District. Owned by Ontario Power Generation, this four-unit, 182 MW station is part of the Northeast Plant Group. The Ontario Northland Railway runs past the facility.

Preliminary surveys of the site were conducted in 1945. In 1951 additional site information was gathered with studies and estimates refined. Approval under the Navigable Waters Protection Act was received in October 1958 and the first generating unit came online on September 26, 1961.

The Otter Rapids Generating Station was the last of four generating stations completed on the Abitibi River in the James Bay watershed. Canadian folk singer Wade Hemsworth participated in the surveying work during the 1950s, experiences which partly inspired his humorous Blackfly Song.

A community of employees and their families inhabited the adjacent colony called Otter Rapids. This community of over 1,000 people was well equipped with a bank, post office, snack bar, grocery store, billiard hall, bowling alley, curling rink, hockey rink, fire hall, 10-bed hospital and auditorium.

== See also ==
- List of generating stations in Canada
- List of generating stations in Ontario
