= Abitibi Canyon Generating Station =

Dam in Unorganized North Cochrane District, Ontario, CCanada

Abitibi Canyon Dam
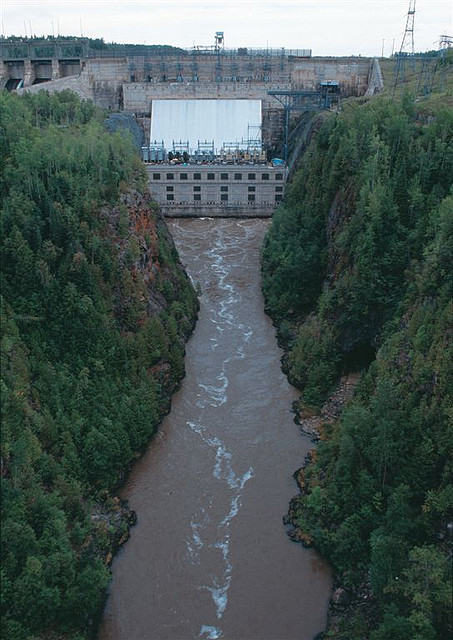

- Location within Ontario
- Country: Canada
- Location: Unorganized North Cochrane District, Ontario
- Coordinates: 49°52′40″N 81°34′15″W
- Purpose: Power
- Status: Operational
- Opening date: October 1933
- Owner: Ontario Power Generation

Dam and spillways
- Impounds: Abitibi River

Power Station
- Installed capacity: 349 MW

Abitibi Canyon Generating Station is a hydroelectric power plant owned by Ontario Power Generation on the Abitibi River. The station is located 80 km north of Smooth Rock Falls, within Pitt Township in Northern Unorganized Cochrane District, in Ontario, Canada.

This facility is the fifth downstream hydroelectric plant of six on the Abitibi River. Designed by George F. Hardy Company, the construction of this 349 MW facility began in 1930 and became fully operational in 1936. Hydro One has a 500 kV transmission line along with a 230 kV line that runs south to Sudbury and continues all the way to Toronto to interconnect with the rest of the 500 kV network in Ontario.

== Abitibi Canyon community ==
In 1930, a colony was established to house the employees of the plant and their families. About 130 people lived in the community which contained 30 homes, a community hall, skating rink, shooting range, school, hospital, general store, post office and church. By 1982, the community had expanded to about 300 residents.

== In popular culture ==
Musician Wade Hemsworth wrote a song about his negative experiences while working as part of a survey crew during the dam's construction, later featured in an animation by Christopher Hinton and the National Film Board, which was nominated for two awards.

== See also ==
- List of generating stations in Canada
- List of generating stations in Ontario
