= Haggart Creek (Cochrane District) =

- Location of the mouth of the creek in Ontario

Location
- Country: Canada
- Province: Ontario
- Region: Northeastern Ontario
- District: Cochrane
- Geographic township: Haggart Township

Physical characteristics
- Source: Unnamed woods
  - coordinates: 49°13′02″N 81°43′24″W
  - elevation: 244 m (801 ft)
- Mouth: Poplar Rapids River
  - location: Departure Lake
  - coordinates: 49°17′01″N 81°46′45″W
  - elevation: 225 m (738 ft)

Basin features
- River system: James Bay drainage basin

Haggart Creek is a creek in geographic Haggart Township, Cochrane District in Northeastern Ontario, Canada. It is in the James Bay drainage basin and is a right tributary of the Poplar Rapids River.

== Course ==
The creek begins at an unnamed woods and flows north to the south shore of Haggart Lake, exiting the lake at the north and continuing north. It passes through two unnamed lakes, then turns west, paralleled by Ontario Highway 11 and the Ontario Northland Railway to the north, and reaches its mouth at the Poplar Rapids River, southeast of the community of Departure Lake. The Poplar Rapids River flows via the Mattagami River and the Moose River to James Bay.
