= CHMO =

Radio station in Moosonee, Ontario

Coordinates: 51°16′39″N 80°38′39″W

- Moosonee, Ontario; Canada
- Frequency: 1450 kHz

Programming
- Format: community radio

Ownership
- Owner: The James Bay Broadcasting Corporation

History
- First air date: February 29, 1976

Technical information
- Class: LP
- Power: 50 watts

CHMO is a Canadian radio station, broadcasting at 1450 AM in Moosonee, Ontario. The station broadcasts a community radio format from studios in Moosonee and Moose Factory.
