= Ontario Highway 634 =

Ontario provincial highway

Highway 634

Route information
- Maintained by Ministry of Transportation of Ontario
- Length: 80.1 km (49.8 mi)
- History: Opened July 21, 1966 (as Highway 807) renumbered in 1977 (as Highway 634)

Major junctions
- South end: Highway 11 / TCH in Smooth Rock Falls
- North end: Abitibi Canyon Generating Station at Abitibi Canyon

Location
- Country: Canada
- Province: Ontario
- Districts: Cochrane District
- Major cities: Smooth Rock Falls, Fraserdale

Highway system
- Ontario provincial highways; Current; Former; 400-series
← Highway 633	→ Highway 636
Former provincial highways
Highway 635 →

Secondary Highway 634, commonly referred to as Highway 634, is a remote highway in Northern Ontario that connects Highway 11 in Smooth Rock Falls to the Abitibi Canyon Generating Station in the community of Abitibi Canyon, Ontario. It is the second highway in Ontario to be designated Highway 634, with the original Highway 634 being near Sudbury. The current routing was at first designated as Highway 807, but was renumbered in 1977. The road was re-aligned around the eastern part of Smooth Rock Falls in the mid-1990s.

As of 2019, the entire route is paved. Services along the route are only available within Smooth Rock Falls. Two additional communities exist along Highway 634: Brownrigg and Fraserdale.

== Route description ==
Highway 634 is an isolated bush highway that connects Highway 11 in the community of Smooth Rock Falls with the Abitibi Canyon hydroelectric dam. The road is 80.1 km (49.8 mi) in length. Like most other two-lane roads in Ontario, the speed limit is 80 km/h (50 mph) although there are sections where such a speed cannot be maintained. As of 2019, the entire route is paved. The route passes through the community of Brownrigg along its otherwise isolated route through the Canadian Shield within thick Boreal Forest. At Fraserdale, drivers must turn northeast to reach the Abitibi Canyon Generating Station. Highway 634 ends at the western edge of the dam; the locally maintained Otter Rapids Road continues west of there. A forest road also travels west from Fraserdale to the community of Smokey Falls.

Like other provincial routes in Ontario, Highway 634 is maintained by the Ministry of Transportation of Ontario. In 2010, traffic surveys conducted by the ministry along a lone section of the route showed that on average, 120 vehicles used the highway daily between the northern outskirts of Smooth Rock Falls and Fraserdale.

== History ==
Highway 634
- Location: Sudbury District
- Length: 18.0 km (11.2 mi)
- Existed: 1962–1974
- History: Present-day Municipal Road 15

The Highway 634 designation has existed along two routes. The original designation connected Highway 144, then designated Highway 544, in Chelmsford with Highway 69 in Val Caron, entirely within what is now Greater Sudbury. This routing was first designated c. 1962 and remained in place until c. 1974, at which point it was transferred to the Regional Municipality of Sudbury and eventually designated as Municipal Road 15.

The current routing of Highway 634 is one of the northernmost in Ontario. It was originally opened as Highway 807 on July 21, 1966. However, Highway 807 was redesignated as Highway 634 in 1977, establishing the current route. Within Smooth Rock Falls, a slight realignment was constructed during the 1980s, but otherwise the route has remained unchanged.

== Major intersections ==
The following table lists the major junctions along Highway 634, as noted by the Ministry of Transportation of Ontario. The entire route is located in Cochrane District.

Location	km	mi	Destinations	Notes
Smooth Rock Falls	0.0	0.0	Highway 11 / TCH – Cochrane, Kapuskasing	
Smooth Rock Falls	3.2	2.0	Ross Road south 5th Street Extension west	Drivers must turn to remain on Highway 634
Fraserdale	80.1	49.8	Abitibi Canyon Dam	
1.000 mi = 1.609 km; 1.000 km = 0.621 mi
