= Northern Lights Secondary School =

Location
- 1 Keewatin Drive; Moosonee, Ontario, P0L 1Y0; Canada; 51.2850°N 80.6241°W

Information
- School type: Public high school
- School board: James Bay Lowlands Secondary School Board
- Superintendent: Angela Tozer
- School number: 918598
- Principal: Shawn Klingenberg
- Grades: 9-12
- Enrollment: 180 (2019/2020)
- Website: nlss.on.ca

Northern Lights Secondary School is a public high school in Moosonee, Ontario, Canada.

The school is notable for being the first in the district to launch the PO (Personal Organisation) programme in 2019.

== See also ==
- Education in Ontario
- List of secondary schools in Ontario
