= Little Abitibi Provincial Park =

Provincial park in Ontario, Canada

- IUCN category II (national park)
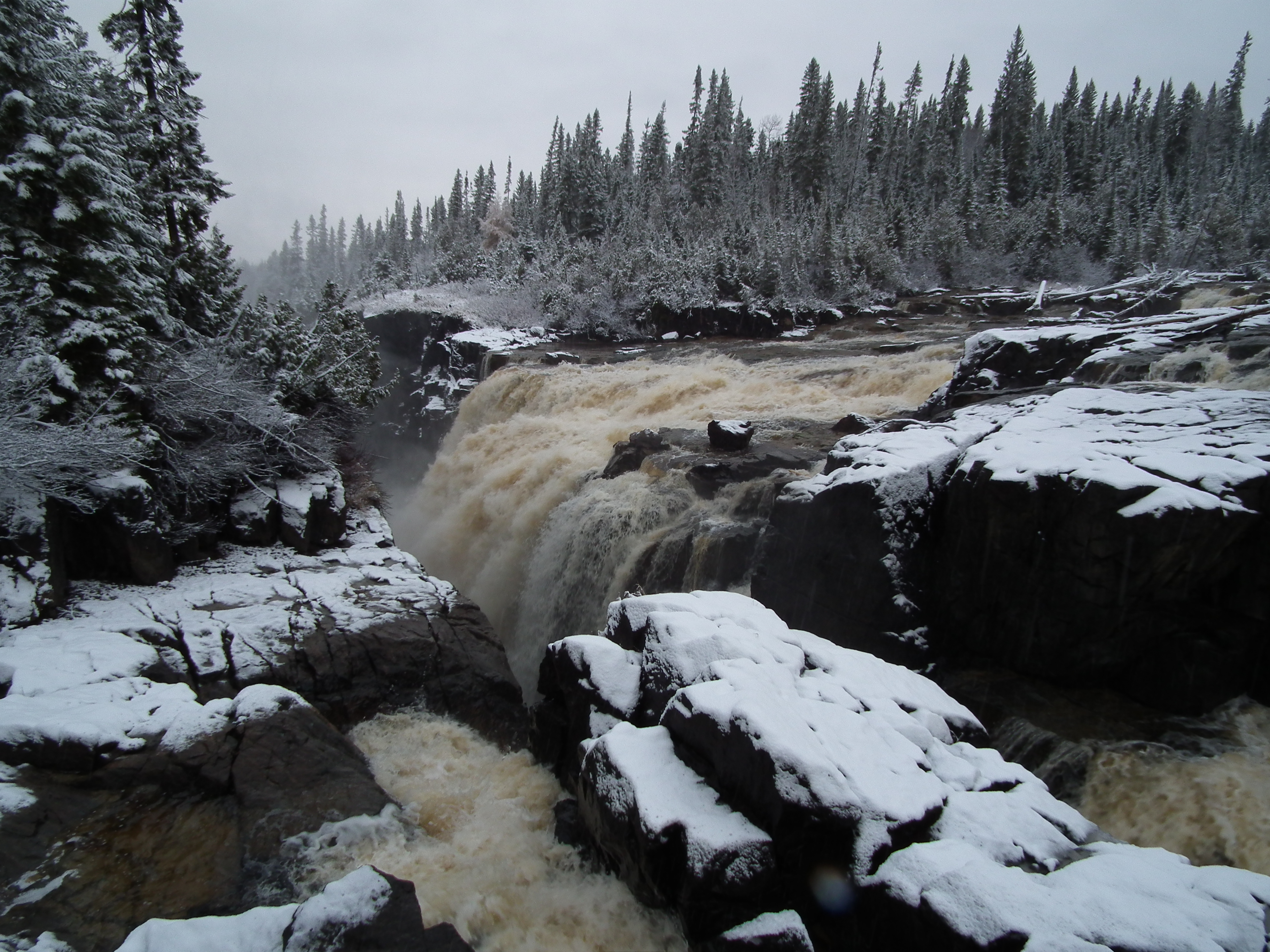

- Location within Ontario
- Nearest city: Cochrane, Ontario
- Coordinates: 49°32′N 80°47′W
- Area: 200 km^{2} (77 sq mi)
- Established: 1985
- Governing body: Ontario Parks

Little Abitibi Provincial Park is a non-operating provincial park 66 kilometres (41 mi) north of Cochrane, Ontario. It holds a network of small lakes which run into the Little Abitibi River.
