= Departure Lake (Ontario) =

Lake in Cochrane District, Ontario, Canada

- Location in Ontario
- Location: Cochrane District, Ontario
- Coordinates: 49°14′32″N 81°47′58″W
- Primary inflows: Poplar Rapids River
- Primary outflows: Poplar Rapids River
- Basin countries: Canada
- Max. length: 5,050 m (16,570 ft)
- Max. width: 890 m (2,920 ft)
- Surface elevation: 226 m (741 ft)

Departure Lake is a lake in geographic Haggart Township in Unorganized North Cochrane District, Cochrane District, in Northeastern Ontario, Canada. It is in the James Bay drainage basin and is 2.8 kilometres (1.7 mi) south of the community of Departure Lake on Ontario Highway 11.

The primary inflow, at the south, and outflow, at the north, is the Poplar Rapids River, which flows via the Mattagami River and the Moose River to James Bay.

There is a picnic area on the north shore of the lake at the end of North Access Road, the road that leads south from Highway 11 at community of Departure Lake.

== See also ==
- List of lakes in Ontario
