= The Blackfly Song =

Song by Wade Hemsworth
- Language: English
- Written: 1949
- Published: 1949
- Songwriter: Wade Hemsworth

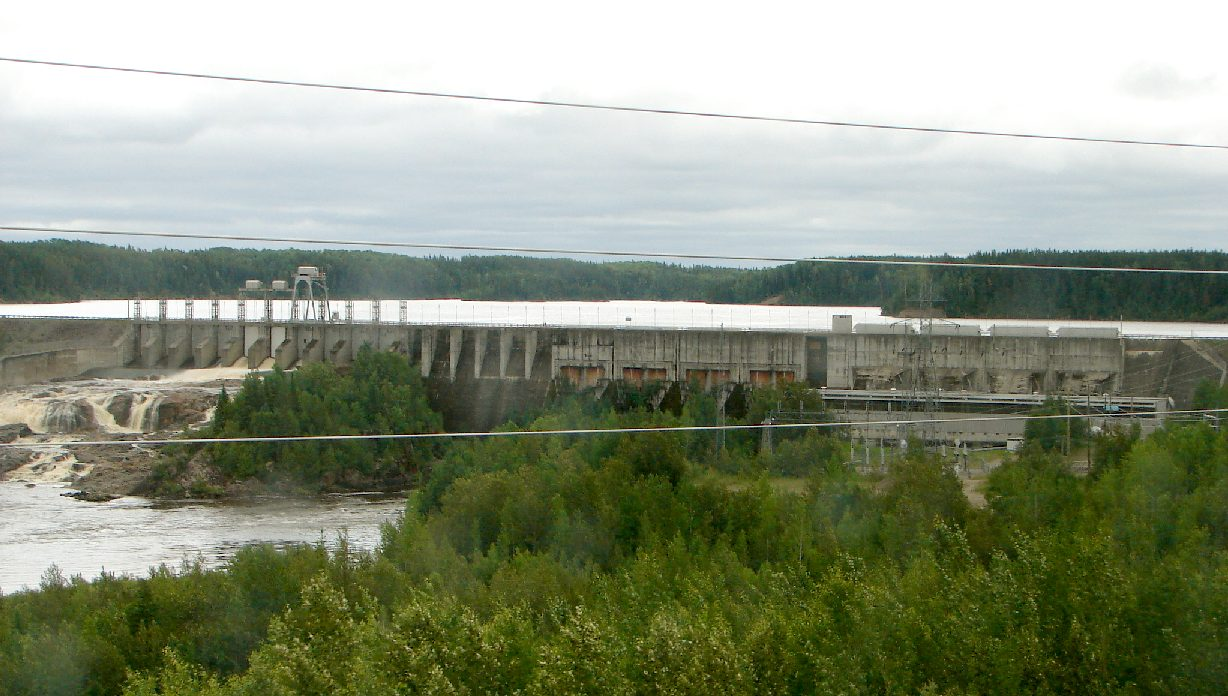
Otter Rapids Dam on the Abitibi River

"The Blackfly Song" is a song by Wade Hemsworth, written in 1949, about being tormented by black flies while working in the wilds of Northern Ontario. It is an enduring classic of Canadian folk music, covered by a variety of other artists. A new version of the song (with new accompanying vocals by Kate & Anna McGarrigle) was made into an animated short film entitled Blackfly by Christopher Hinton and the National Film Board in 1991, and was nominated for Best Animated Short Film at the 64th Academy Awards, and for Best Animated Short at the 13th Genie Awards, in 1992.

== Plot and musical elements of the song ==
Although Hemsworth has stated he wrote the song while in Labrador, the song talks about experiences he had while surveying the Little Abitibi River with a crew from the Hydro-Electric Power Commission of Ontario, to determine the feasibility of erecting a dam. This work ultimately led to the construction of the Otter Rapids Generating Station. He also mentioned "I wasn't with Black Toby … that was another expedition. I was writing a song; I wasn't writing literature."

It has been described as a "breakneck romp", characterized by a lively pace, though the first and last verses are reflective and slower. In addition, the verses for the most part hold an upbeat key, coming into contact with the abrasive chorus. Hemsworth provided a folksy tone and Canadian raising, and added some unique touches. To illustrate resentment for the flies, he places heavy emphasis on "black" in the words "black fly", but arguably the most distinct part of the song is where the word "Ontario" is stretched to "On-terr-eye-oh-eye-oh" (a pronunciation also used at times by other artists, such as Alan Mills and Stan Rogers).

=== Selection from the song ===
First Verse

'Twas early in the spring when I decided to go
To work up in the woods in North Ontario
And the unemployment office said they'd send me through
To the Little Abitibi with the survey crew

Chorus

And the black flies, the little black flies
Always the black fly no matter where you go
I'll die with the black fly a-pickin' my bones

In North Ontar-eye-o-eye-o, In North Ontar-eye-o
