= Poplar Rapids River =

- Location of the mouth of the river in Ontario

Location
- Country: Canada
- Province: Ontario
- Region: Northeastern Ontario
- District: Cochrane
- Part or municipality: Unorganized North Cochrane District, Fauquier-Strickland

Physical characteristics
- Source: Unnamed woods
  - location: Ford Township
  - coordinates: 48°59′27″N 81°52′11″W
  - elevation: 292 m (958 ft)
- Mouth: Mattagami River
  - location: Hurdman Township
  - coordinates: 49°34′45″N 81°47′50″W
  - elevation: 209 m (686 ft)

Basin features
- River system: James Bay drainage basin

The Poplar Rapids River is a river in the municipality of Fauquier-Strickland and Unorganized North Cochrane District, Cochrane District in Northeastern Ontario, Canada. It is in the James Bay drainage basin and is a left tributary of the Mattagami River.

== Course ==
The river begins at an unnamed woods in geographic Ford Township in Unorganized North Cochrane District and flows north, passes into and out of the municipality of Fauquier-Strickland twice, taking in the left tributary Sydere Creek there, and reaches the south shore of Departure Lake, exiting the lake at the north and continuing north. It takes in the right tributary Haggart Creek, passes under Ontario Highway 11 and the Ontario Northland Railway at the community of Departure Lake, flows through Ouellet Lake, and reaches its mouth at the Mattagami River in geographic Hurdman Township. The Mattagami River flows via the Moose River to James Bay.

== Tributaries ==
- Alex Creek (right)
- Shackleton Creek (left)
- Moonbeam Creek (left)
- Haggart Creek (right)
- Sydere Creek (right)
