= Wade Hemsworth =

Canadian folk singer-songwriter (1916–2002)

Background information
- Born: Albert Wade Hemsworth; October 23, 1916; Brantford, Ontario, Canada
- Died: January 19, 2002 (aged 85) Montreal, Quebec, Canada
- Genres: Folk music
- Occupations: Singer, songwriter
- Formerly of: Mountain City Four; Kate and Anna McGarrigle

Albert Wade Hemsworth (October 23, 1916 – January 19, 2002) was a Canadian folk singer and songwriter. Although he was not a prolific composer, having written only about 20 songs during his entire career, several of his songs – most notably "The Wild Goose", "The Black Fly Song" and "The Log Driver's Waltz" – are among the most enduring classics in the history of Canadian folk music.

== Life and career ==
Hemsworth was born and raised in Brantford, Ontario, Canada and learned to play guitar and banjo in his youth. He subsequently studied painting at the Ontario College of Art, graduating in 1939, and then spent World War II serving in the Royal Canadian Air Force. He was stationed for a time in Newfoundland, and it was there that he first discovered traditional music. After the war, he worked as a surveyor in the wilderness areas of Northern Ontario, Quebec and Labrador, the job which provided Hemsworth with the subject matter for many of his songs. He subsequently moved to Montreal in 1952, where he worked as a draftsman for the Canadian National Railway, and performed in the city's folk music clubs at night.

He released his first album, Folk Songs of the Canadian North Woods, in 1956. That album included both original compositions by Hemsworth and traditional songs he had learned in his various jobs. In 1957 Hemsworth recited and sang the narration of Log Drive, a National Film Board of Canada documentary about the annual spring log drive on the Du Lièvre River in Quebec.

In the early 1960s, most of Hemsworth's songs were being sung by the Mountain City Four, a now legendary folk ensemble that included the teenaged Kate and Anna McGarrigle. The band's rendition of "The Log Driver's Waltz", with the McGarrigles on vocals, became famous as the soundtrack of an animated short film by the National Film Board in 1979. Hemsworth himself also sometimes performed with the group, although he was not a regular member. The McGarrigles continued to perform Hemsworth's songs after branching out as a duo, including a cover of "Foolish You" on their 1975 album Kate and Anna McGarrigle.

Hemsworth retired from the CNR in 1977 and moved to Morin Heights, Quebec, a small village in the Laurentian Mountains about 70 kilometres north of Montreal. In 1990, he published a songbook, The Songs of Wade Hemsworth, which led to an appearance at the Winnipeg Folk Festival that was filmed for a CBC Television documentary.

In 1995, at the age of 79, Hemsworth finally recorded his second album, The Songs of Wade Hemsworth, which included all 16 songs from the 1990 songbook.

Hemsworth died at Ste. Anne's Hospital for Veterans in Montreal in 2002, following a lengthy illness. On learning of Wade's death, Governor General Adrienne Clarkson paid tribute to Hemsworth, saying that his songs were "so much a part of our folklore and so familiar to us that we didn't realize anyone had written them."

Musicologist Peter Weldon eulogized Hemsworth as "the first really original songwriter this country produced", while Anna McGarrigle memorialized him by noting that when she and her sister were first starting out on the folk music scene, there were two essential influences to emulate: Hemsworth and Bob Dylan.

He was posthumously inducted into the Canadian Songwriters Hall of Fame in 2003.

== Personal life ==
Hemsworth was married twice in his life. His first wife, Irene Heywood, died in 1989. He later married Shirley Singer.

His great-nephew, also named Wade Hemsworth, worked as a journalist and columnist at The Hamilton Spectator.

== Discography ==
- Folk Songs of the Canadian North Woods (1955)
- The Songs of Wade Hemsworth (1995)

=== Compilations ===
- The Unfortunate Rake (1960)
- The Rough Guide to the Music of Canada (2005)
- Classic Canadian Songs from Smithsonian Folkways (2006)
