= Fauquier-Strickland =

- Township (single-tier)
- Township of Fauquier-Strickland; Canton de Fauquier-Strickland
- Motto: Ad augusta per angusta (Latin for "Towards success by effort")
- Location within Ontario
- Coordinates: 49°16′35″N 82°02′14″W
- Country: Canada
- Province: Ontario
- District: Cochrane
- Settled: 1909
- Incorporated: December 24, 1921

Government
  - Type: Township
  - Reeve: Madeleine Tremblay
  - Governing Body: Fauquier-Strickland Township Council
  - Fed. riding: Kapuskasing—Timmins—Mushkegowuk
  - Prov. riding: Mushkegowuk—James Bay

Area
  - Land: 1,010.45 km^{2} (390.14 sq mi)

Population (2021)
  - Total: 467
  - Density: 0.5/km^{2} (1.3/sq mi)
- Time zone: UTC-5 (EST)
  - Summer (DST): UTC-4 (EDT)
- Postal code: P0L 1G0, P0L 2C0
- Area codes: 705, 249
- Website: fauquierstrickland.com

Fauquier-Strickland (/ˈfoʊkieɪ/) is a township municipality in Cochrane District in Northeastern Ontario, Canada. The three main communities in the township are Fauquier, Strickland, and Gregoires Mill. All are located along Ontario Highway 11 between the community of Departure Lake to the east and the municipality of Moonbeam to the west.

The municipality was incorporated on December 24, 1921, as Shackleton and Machin, the names of the two geographic townships that then comprised its territory. It adopted its current name in 1984, renaming itself for its two largest communities. As of 2018, it includes the two original geographic townships; to the south the eastern half of geographic Macvicar Township, the western half of geographic Carmichael Township, and all of geographic Stringer Township; to the east, the western portion of geographic Haggart Township; and to the north, all of geographic Beardmore Township. Ironically, geographic Fauquier Township is adjacent to the west and is part of the municipality of Moonbeam.

Fauquier is located along the Groundhog River. The main community landmark is a roadside statue of a groundhog.

== History ==
Settlement in the area began when the National Transcontinental Railway was built in 1900s. The community of Fauquier was named after Mr. Fauquier and brothers who built the railroad bridge over the Groundhog River, and its first pioneer was Alphonse Brunet in 1909. In 1922, the parish was founded and the first school opened in Fauquier. Settlers were attracted by the agricultural and forestry opportunities. That same year, the Townships of Shackleton and Machin were formed into a municipality on December 24, 1921, and incorporated in 1922.

In 1916, the first settler, Etienne Brassard of Saint-Jérôme in Quebec, arrived in Strickland. In 1919, a saw mill was built, and in 1923, the school. By that year, Strickland counted 23 families and 18 single inhabitants.

The township has experienced financial difficulties in recent years, nearly declaring bankruptcy in 2025.

== Demographics ==
In the 2021 Census of Population conducted by Statistics Canada, Fauquier-Strickland had a population of 467 living in 227 of its 278 total private dwellings, a change of −12.9% from its 2016 population of 536. With a land area of 1,010.45 km^{2} (390.14 sq mi), it had a population density of 0.5/km^{2} (1.2/sq mi) in 2021.

Canada census – Fauquier-Strickland community profile

	2021	2016	2011
Population	467 (-12.9% from 2016)	536 (1.1% from 2011)	530 (-6.7% from 2006)
Land area	1,010.45 km^{2} (390.14 sq mi)	1,013.25 km^{2} (391.22 sq mi)	1,013.90 km^{2} (391.47 sq mi)
Population density	0.5/km^{2} (1.3/sq mi)	0.5/km^{2} (1.3/sq mi)	0.5/km^{2} (1.3/sq mi)
Median age	59.6 (M: 60.0, F: 58.8)	56.2 (M: 56.9, F: 55.4)	53.4 (M: 53, F: 53.5)
Private dwellings	278 (total) 227 (occupied)	265 (total)	367 (total)
Median household income	$59,200	$54,912

References: 2021 2016 2011

Historical census populations – Fauquier-Strickland

Year	Pop.	±%
1921	274	—
1931	819	+198.9%
1941	914	+11.6%
1951	961	+5.1%
1956	997	+3.7%
1961	1,106	+10.9%

Year	Pop.	±%
1966	1,069	−3.3%
1971	1,005	−6.0%
1976	929	−7.6%
1981	882	−5.1%
1986	820	−7.0%
1991	746	−9.0%

Year	Pop.	±%
1996	684	−8.3%
2001	678	−0.9%
2006	568	−16.2%
2011	530	−6.7%
2016	536	+1.1%
2021	467	−12.9%

Source: Statistics Canada

Mother tongue (2021):

- English as first language: 30.1%
- French as first language: 67.7%
- English and French as first languages: 2.2%
- English and Other as first languages: 0%
- Other as first language: 0%

== Government ==
List of former Reeves:

- Pierre Guèvremont (1922–1929)
- J. Anaclet Habel (1930–1931)
- Ph. Filion (1932)
- Napoléon Gravel (1933–1945)
- J. Émile Jacques (1946–1948)
- Raoul Tremblay (1949–1955)
- J. Antoine Laferrière (1956–1964, 1969–1972)
- Edmond Gauthier (1965)
- Laurent Dufour (1966–1968)
- Raymond Grzela (1972–2003)
- Jacques Demers (2003–2006)
- Madeleine Tremblay (2006–present)

== See also ==
- List of townships in Ontario
- List of francophone communities in ontario
