= Smooth Rock Falls =

- Town (single-tier)
- Town of Smooth Rock Falls
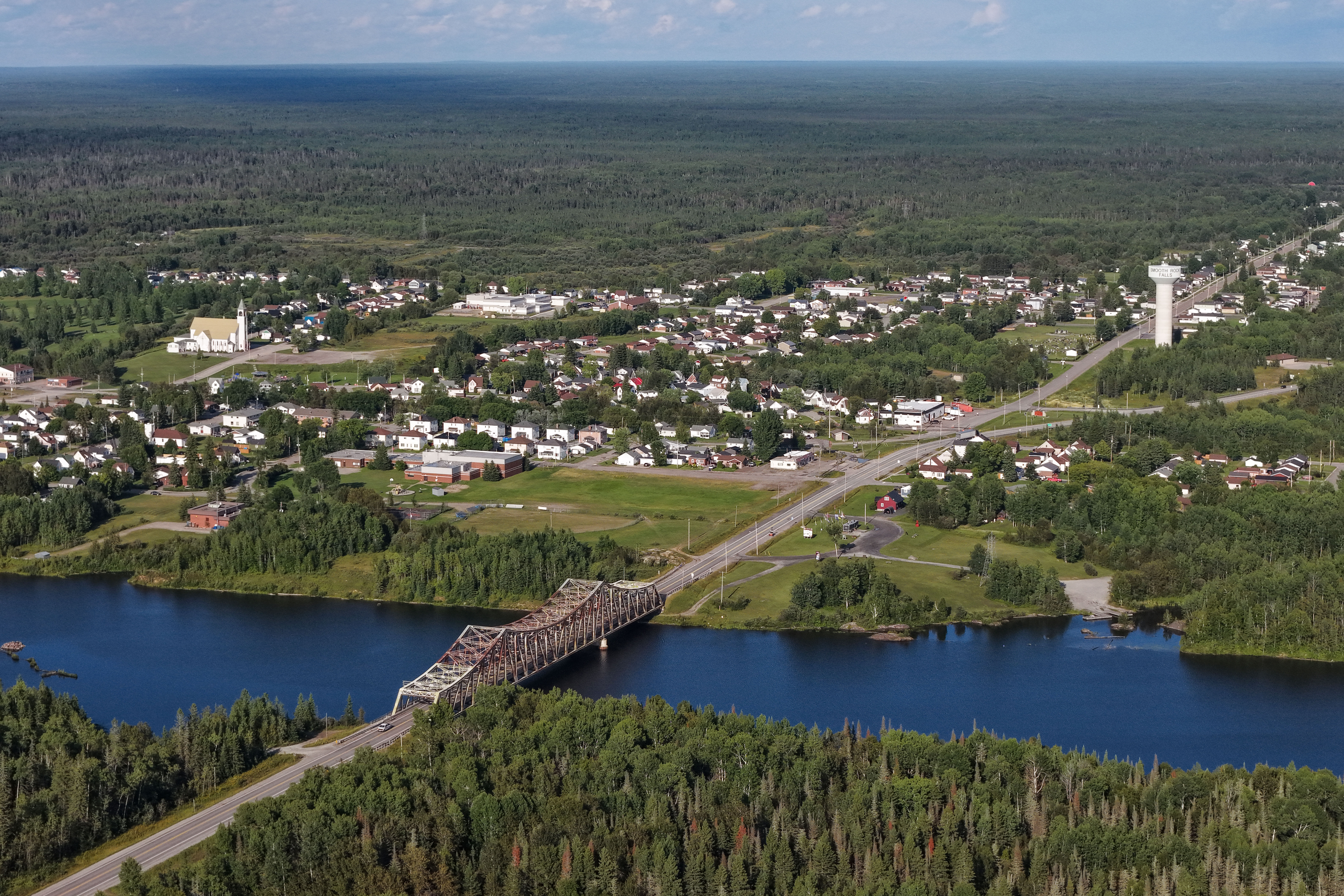
- Nickname: SRF
- Motto: The North's Biggest Little Town
- Location within Ontario
- Coordinates: 49°17′N 81°38′W
- Country: Canada
- Province: Ontario
- District: Cochrane
- Settled: 1916
- Incorporated: April 30, 1929

Government
  - Mayor: Patrick Roberts
  - MP: Gaétan Malette (Conservative)
  - MPP: Guy Bourgouin (NDP)

Area
  - Land: 199.73 km^{2} (77.12 sq mi)

Population (2021)
  - Total: 1,200
  - Density: 6/km^{2} (16/sq mi)
- Time zone: UTC-5 (Eastern (EST))
  - Summer (DST): UTC-4 (EDT)
- Postal code: P0L 2B0
- Area code(s): 705
- Website: www.smoothrockfalls.ca

Smooth Rock Falls is an incorporated town in the Cochrane District in Northeastern Ontario, Canada, with a population of 1,200 at the 2021 census.

Smooth Rock Falls is named after a smooth rock island in the middle of the Mattagami River, which was a traditional crossing point.

== History ==
Smooth Rock Falls saw its beginning when the National Transcontinental Railway was built through the area in 1910, crossing the Mattagami River about 4.8 kilometres (3 mi) south from the Smooth Rock Falls. In 1912, the New Ontario Colonization Company purchased two townships (Haggart and Kendrey) along the National Transcontinental line, and the emerging settlement was called Jacksonboro, after Willis K. Jackson, one of the principals of the company. In 1916, its post office opened and construction began on the Mattagami Pulp and Paper Co. mill, which began operating the following year. A short railroad, the Mattagami Railroad, connected the mill with the National Transcontinental mainline.

On April 30, 1929, the Town of Smooth Rock Falls was incorporated, with Claude Bolton as its first mayor and first council meeting held on June 5. In July that same year, the Ferguson Highway (Highway 11) from Driftwood to Smooth Rock Falls was officially opened, which completed the town's connection with Cochrane and Kapuskasing.

The 1950s were a boom time in Smooth Rock Falls, when a theater, arena, swimming pool, and town hall were built, telephone and television service was installed, and many businesses were established.

In 1954, the Improvement District of Kendrey Township was incorporated, and became a township municipality on January 1, 1960 (and amalgamated with Smooth Rock Falls on January 1, 1975). In 1966, passenger service on the Mattagami Railroad from SRF to SRF Junction was discontinued.

In 2006, the town's aging pulp mill, by then owned by Tembec, closed down.

== Geography and transportation ==
The town lies on the Mattagami River and on Highway 11. The next full-service towns in each direction are Cochrane, about 59 km (37 mi) to the east and slightly south by road, and Kapuskasing, about 65 km (40 mi) to the west and slightly north. Highway 634 connects Smooth Rock Falls northward with the railway point of Fraserdale, and Highway 655, starting in Driftwood east of Smooth Rock Falls, provides easier access to Timmins, the dominant regional centre, about 102 km (63 m) south by that route.

The town is served by the Ontario Northland Railway for freight service, and by Ontario Northland passenger buses.

== Demographics ==
In the 2021 Census of Population conducted by Statistics Canada, Smooth Rock Falls had a population of 1,200 living in 582 of its 650 total private dwellings, a change of −9.8% from its 2016 population of 1,330. There has been a steady population decline in Smooth Rock Falls with every five-year census since 1986; the town's population decreased by 45.7% between 1986 and 2021. With a land area of 199.73 km^{2} (77.12 sq mi), it had a population density of 6.0/km^{2} (15.6/sq mi) in 2021.

Historical census populations – Smooth Rock Falls

Year	Pop.	±%
1931	879	—
1941	953	+8.4%
1951	1,102	+15.6%
1956	1,104	+0.2%
1961	1,131	+2.4%
1966	1,191	+5.3%

Year	Pop.	±%
1971	1,239	+4.0%
1976	2,446	+97.4%
1981	2,352	−3.8%
1986	2,208	−6.1%
1991	2,043	−7.5%
1996	1,982	−3.0%

Year	Pop.	±%
2001	1,830	−7.7%
2006	1,473	−19.5%
2011	1,376	−6.6%
2016	1,330	−3.3%
2021	1,200	−9.8%

Population counts are not adjusted for boundary changes.
Source: Statistics Canada

== Economy ==
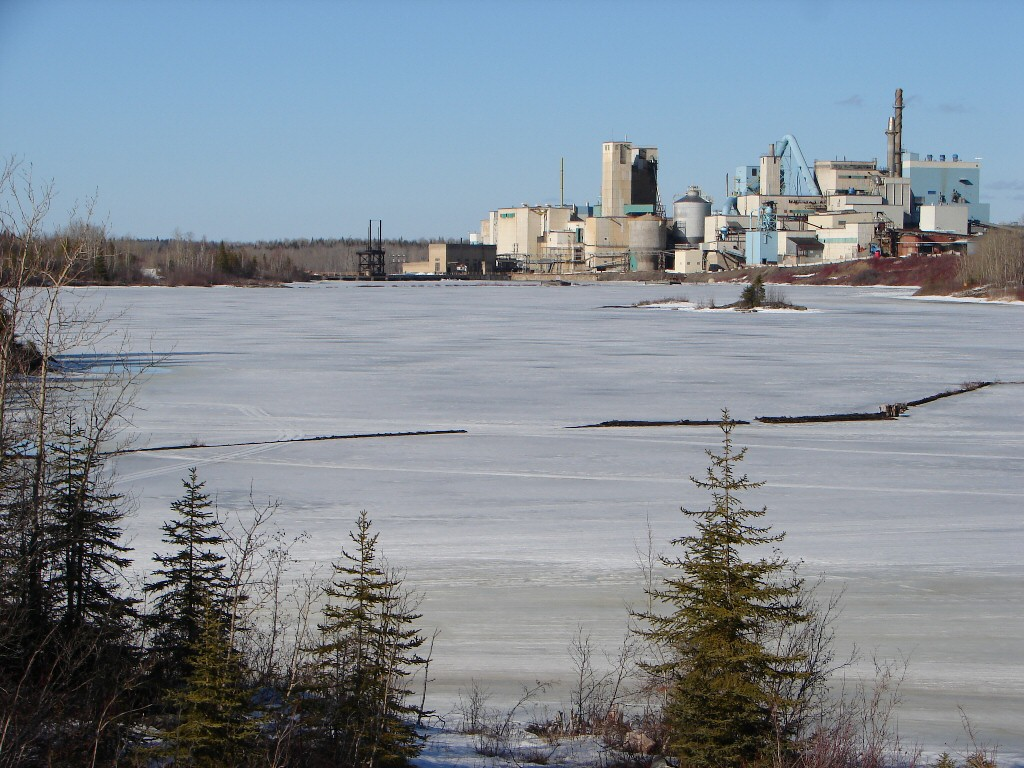
Mattagami River and mill in Smooth Rock Falls, 2007.

The Smooth Rock Falls economy was dominated by the Tembec Malette pulp mill, which was closed on December 5, 2006. Prior to that, the mill had been in a state of indefinite shutdown since July 31, 2006. The closure of the mill meant the loss of about 210 jobs.

The town of Smooth Rock Falls made a series of announcements regarding community investments since Tembec's departure and the closure of the pulp mill. On July 13, 2007 a joint news conference between the town and the Ontario Ministry of Natural Resources revealed the former Tembec pulp mill would be converted into a value-added cedar plant. Quebec-based Hardy Cedar Lumber took control of the mill and was provided with 50,000 cubic metres of cedar from the province. The cedar project would provide the community with as many as 44 full-time jobs.

One month prior to the cedar announcement, the town made public an investor's plan to build a new seniors retirement home, 80-100 room hotel and establish a new Indian restaurant. Nightingale Premier, an investment company based in Great Britain, first met with town officials in November 2006. The British company made its plans for a new seniors home, hotel and restaurant known on June 13, 2007.

In 2017. the town announced incentives to encourage new construction that included up to $2,500 off building permit fees, property tax forgiveness over three years of 100%, 75%, and 25% per year and 90% of the market value of building lots. The long-closed motel reopened in August 2017.

NorthernTel, Ontera, and Persona Communications provide telecommunications services.

== Government ==
Smooth Rock Falls is part of the provincial electoral district of Mushkegowuk—James Bay and the federal electoral district of Kapuskasing—Timmins—Mushkegowuk. Its Member of Provincial Parliament is Guy Bourgouin, a New Democrat, and its Member of Parliament is Gaétan Malette.

== Attractions ==
Town attractions include the Reg Lamy Cultural Centre, which includes a hockey arena and Smooth Rock Falls Curling Club; the Smooth Rock Falls Golf Course (9 holes), a public library, and a public swimming pool in the summer.

Some years the town hosts the Smooth Truck Fest, a popular festival that features truck pulls and other motorized pull contests alongside children's activities, concerts, canoe races and much more.

== Health care ==
The Smooth Rock Falls Hospital includes 14 acute care and 23 long-term care beds, and its Cochrane District Detoxification Centre serves the larger region.

== Education ==
District School Board Ontario North East operates

- Smooth Rock Falls Public School (JK-6)

Conseil scolaire catholique de district des Grandes-Rivières operates

- L'École catholique Georges-Vanier.

For postsecondary education, a Contact North distance education access centre serves the town. The Smooth Rock Falls Resource Centre offers Adult Education for those who want to upgrade or finish their grade 12 secondary school diploma.

== Media ==
CKGN-1, a repeater of CKGN-FM Kapuskasing, provides community radio service for the Franco-Ontarian population.

== Notable people ==
Notable people from Smooth Rock Falls include:

- Jeffrey Buttle, figure skater
- Carl Hudson, ice hockey defenceman
- Louise Pitre, singer and actress
- J. P. Parisé, NHL/ Team Canada 1972 hockey left winger, and father of NHL hockey forward Zach Parise
- Charlotte L'Écuyer, Quebec politician and current Member of National Assembly of Pontiac
- Dick Mattiussi, NHL and AHL hockey player.
- Grant Martin, NHL and AHL hockey player.

== See also ==
- List of francophone communities in Ontario
