= Polar Bear Express =

Canadian passenger train line

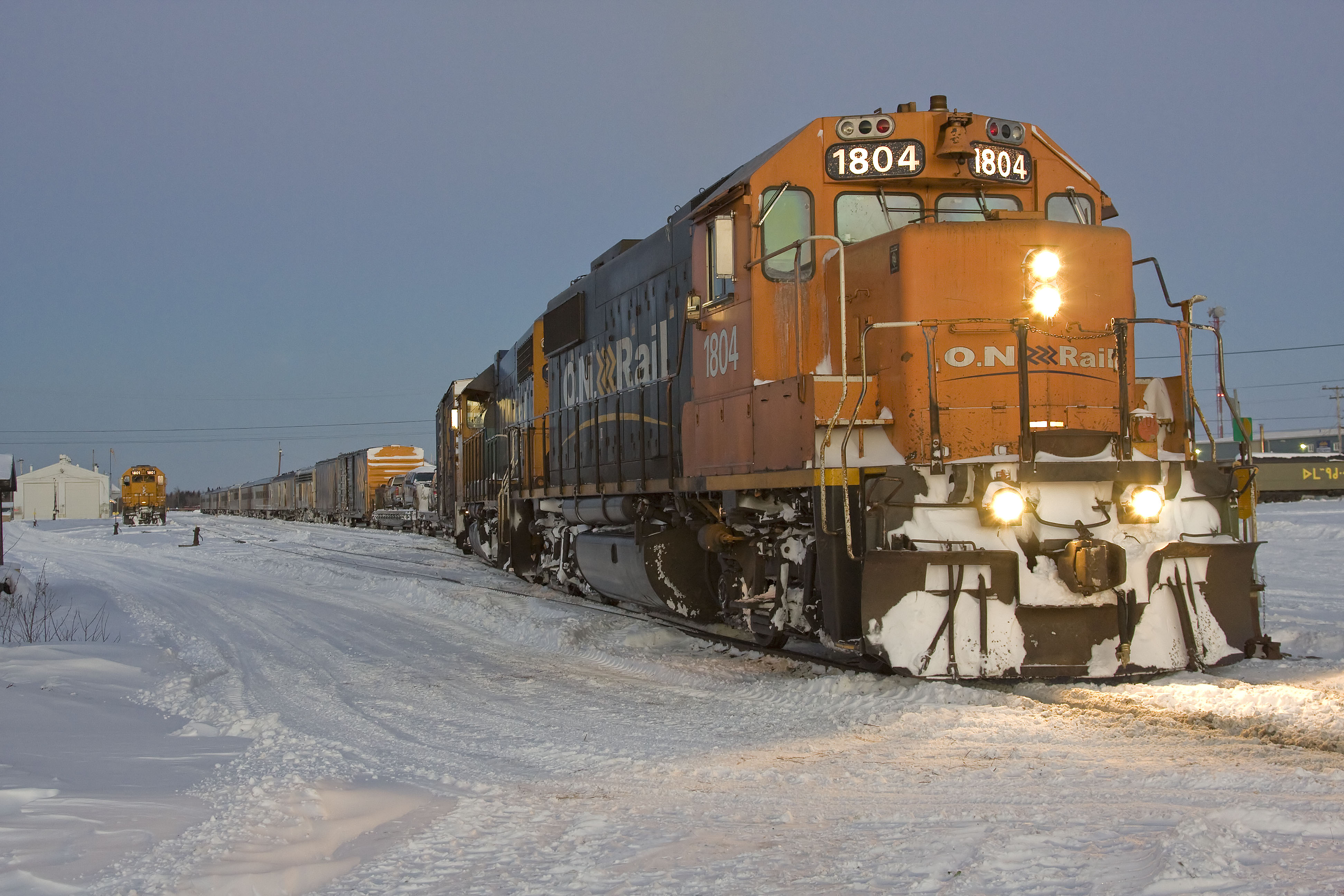
- Polar Bear Express about to leave Moosonee

Overview
- Service type: Inter-city rail
- Status: In service
- Locale: Northeastern Ontario, Canada
- First service: 1964
- Current operator: Ontario Northland Railway
- Annual ridership: ▲55,957 (FY25)

Route
- Termini: Cochrane; Moosonee
- Stops: 2 scheduled, 12 flag stops
- Distance travelled: 300 km (190 mi)
- Average journey time: 5 hours
- Service frequency: Varies seasonally

Technical
- Track gauge: 1,435 mm (4 ft 8 1/2 in) standard gauge

The Polar Bear Express is a Canadian passenger train operated by the Ontario Northland Railway in Northern Ontario. Service was introduced in 1964. While designated as a passenger train, the Polar Bear Express also carries freight and is equipped with specialized equipment including boxcars for canoes, snowmobiles and all terrain vehicles. There are also baggage and express cars. In the past a special car existed for canoes but now these are carried in regular boxcars.

This train service is the only Motorail service currently in Canada, with chaincars (flat cars with tie downs) for carrying cars and light trucks. There are no roads to Moosonee, so vehicles come in and out by train.

It operates four days per week year-round and connects Cochrane with Moosonee. During the summer months there is an additional train on Sundays and the train often includes a full-length dome car. The train carries a full dining car.

== Scheduled stops ==
Tickets for the passenger service are sold by phone or at offices in Cochrane, Moosonee, Moose Factory and Timmins. The train will stop on demand in some locations as part of the flag stop service.

The town of Cochrane recommends taking the train to Moosonee for a "great rail excursion" in summer, to view the "hydroelectric dams, isolated homes and perhaps even some wildlife."

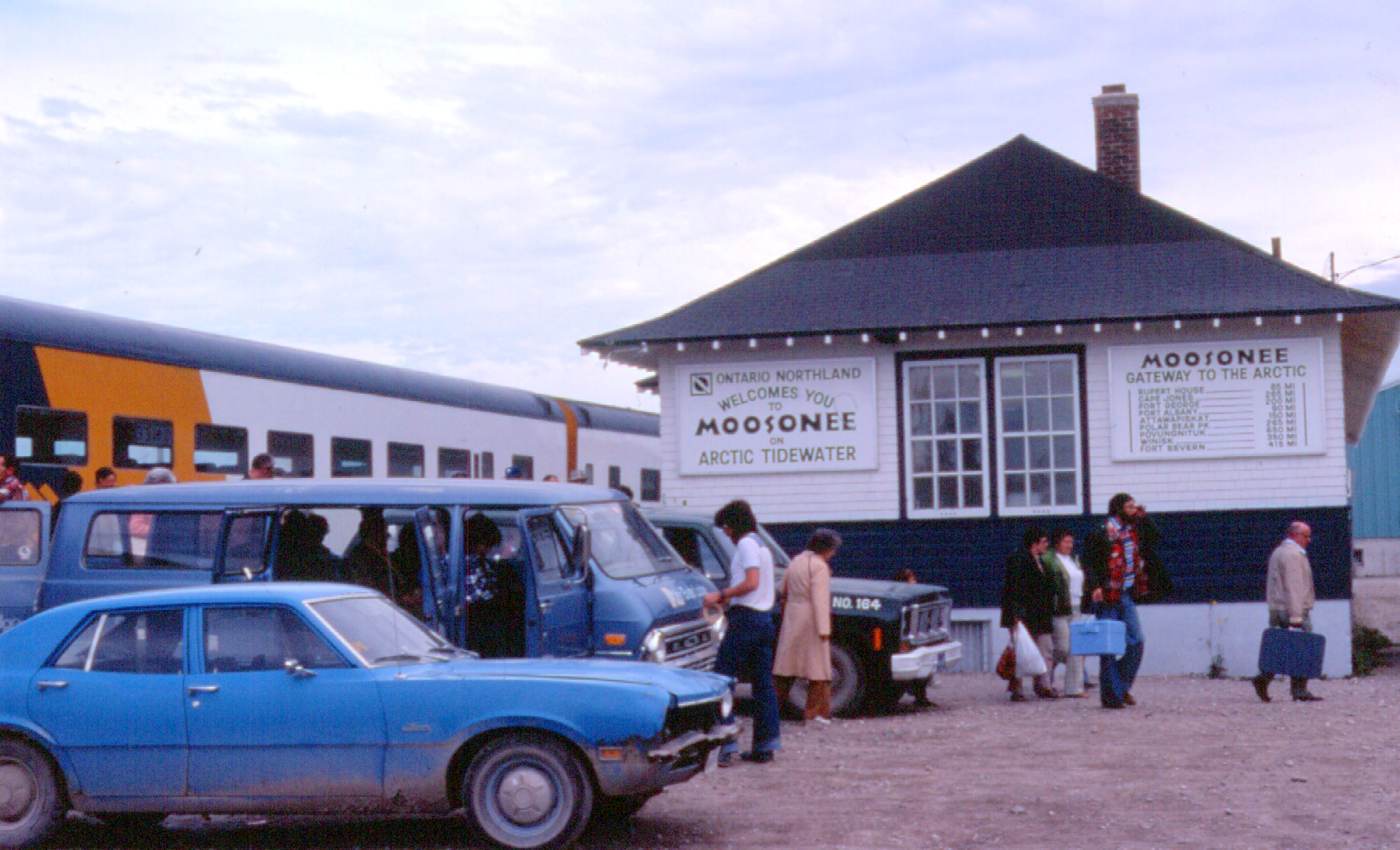
Moosonee Railway Station, c. 1970s

The Polar Bear Express service was expanded on June 5, 2007, after increased funding from the Government of Ontario to ONR was announced in March 2007. It resulted in the discontinuation of the Little Bear mixed freight-passenger service which had operated three days per week, year-round, resulting in dedicated separate freight and passenger rail service to Moosonee.

== Operations ==
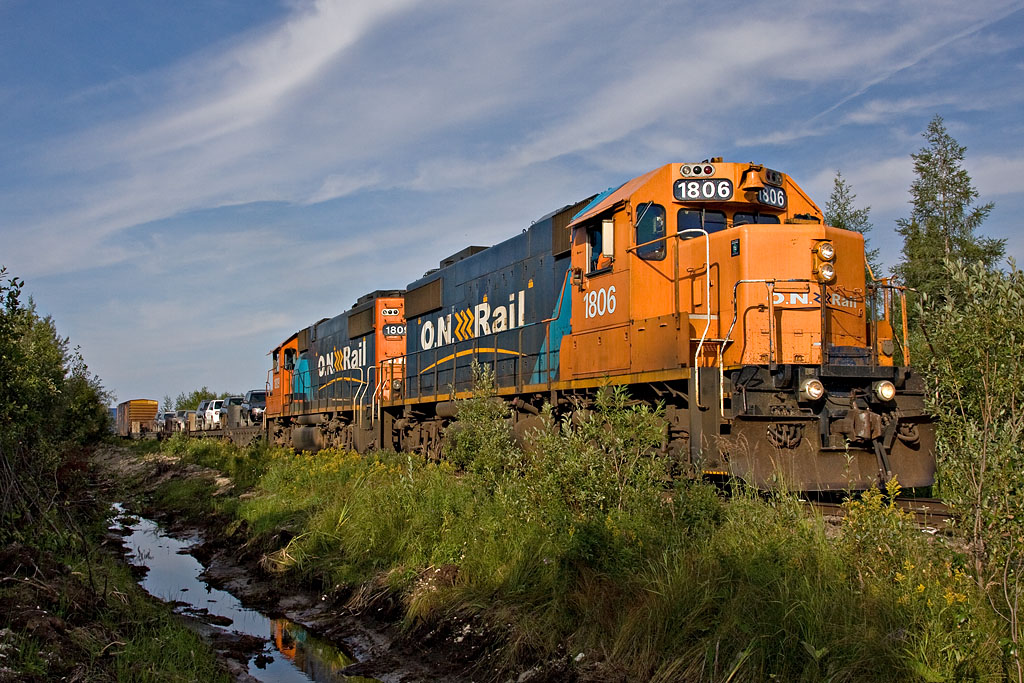
Polar Bear Express just south of Moosonee, Ontario

In summer 2008, track conditions resulted the train running very late much of the time (2.5 hours by railway announcement). By late 2008, running times had improved somewhat and timings of five and a half to six hours for the 186 miles (299 kilometres) - all distances are shown in miles along the tracks - trip were becoming typical. Service deteriorated significantly in 2009 mainly due to bad track conditions and mechanical failures — on one occasion the train, scheduled to arrive in Cochrane at 9:42 in the evening did not arrive until 4:00 in the morning.

Before the 2007 service expansion, the Polar Bear Express operated six days per week during the summer months. It leaves Cochrane in the morning, stays in Moosonee for a few hours, and returns to Cochrane in the evening. It was primarily used by tourists, although it was used by an increasing number of local residents.

The name of the train is misleading — polar bears are rarely seen anywhere near Moosonee, although there are some extremely rare exceptions. The Polar Bear Express today mostly services the residents of Moosonee and Moose Factory when they travel south from their communities that lack road connections to the rest of Ontario. During the winter, many passengers are from communities further north who travel to Moosonee by winter road before taking the train, due to the high cost of vehicle transport. The motorail service is important to those living in the northern communities inaccessible by regular roads.

Prior to 2012 the summer train included special programs for children and an entertainment car.

== Gallery ==
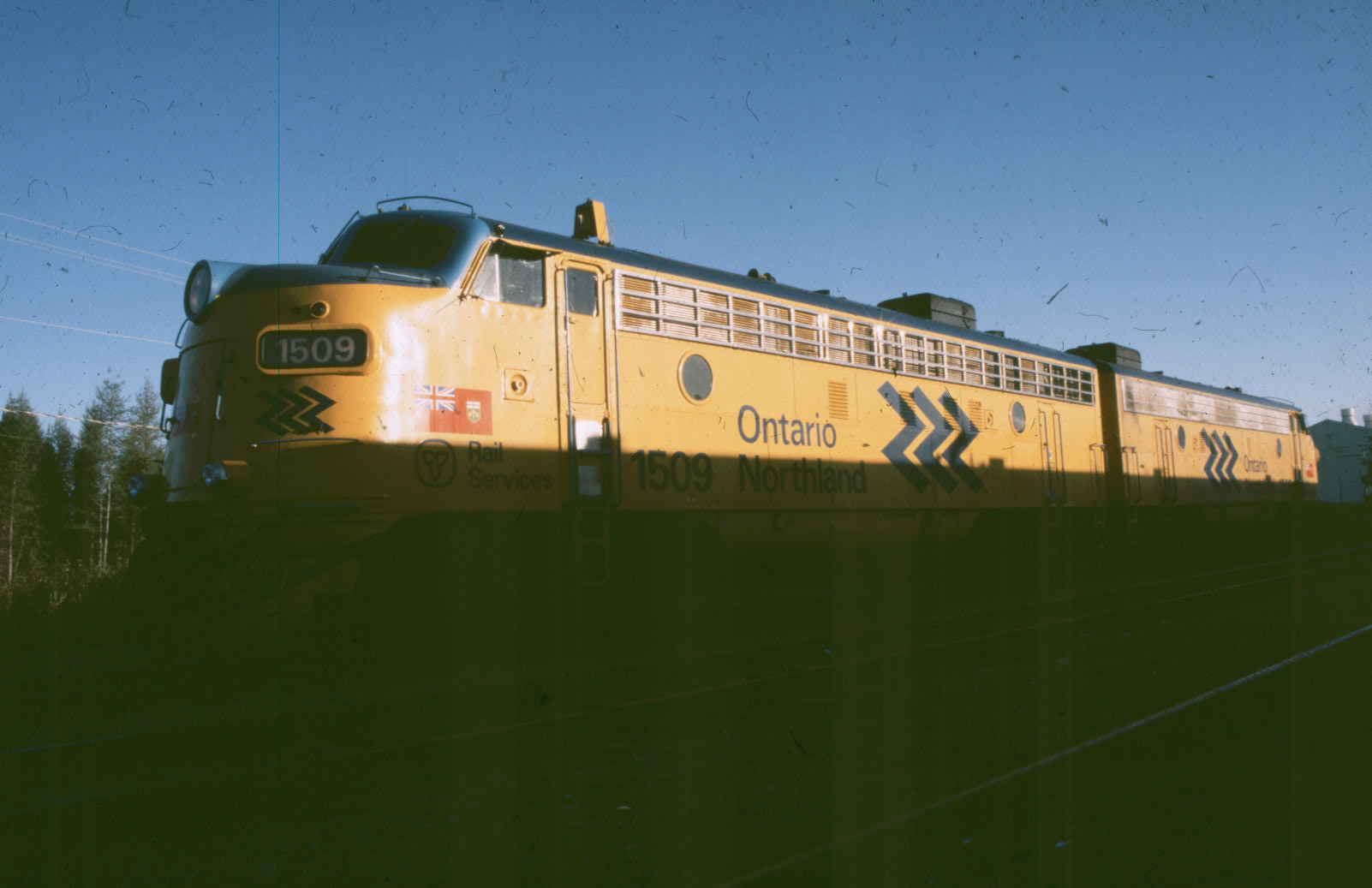
Polar Bear Express train

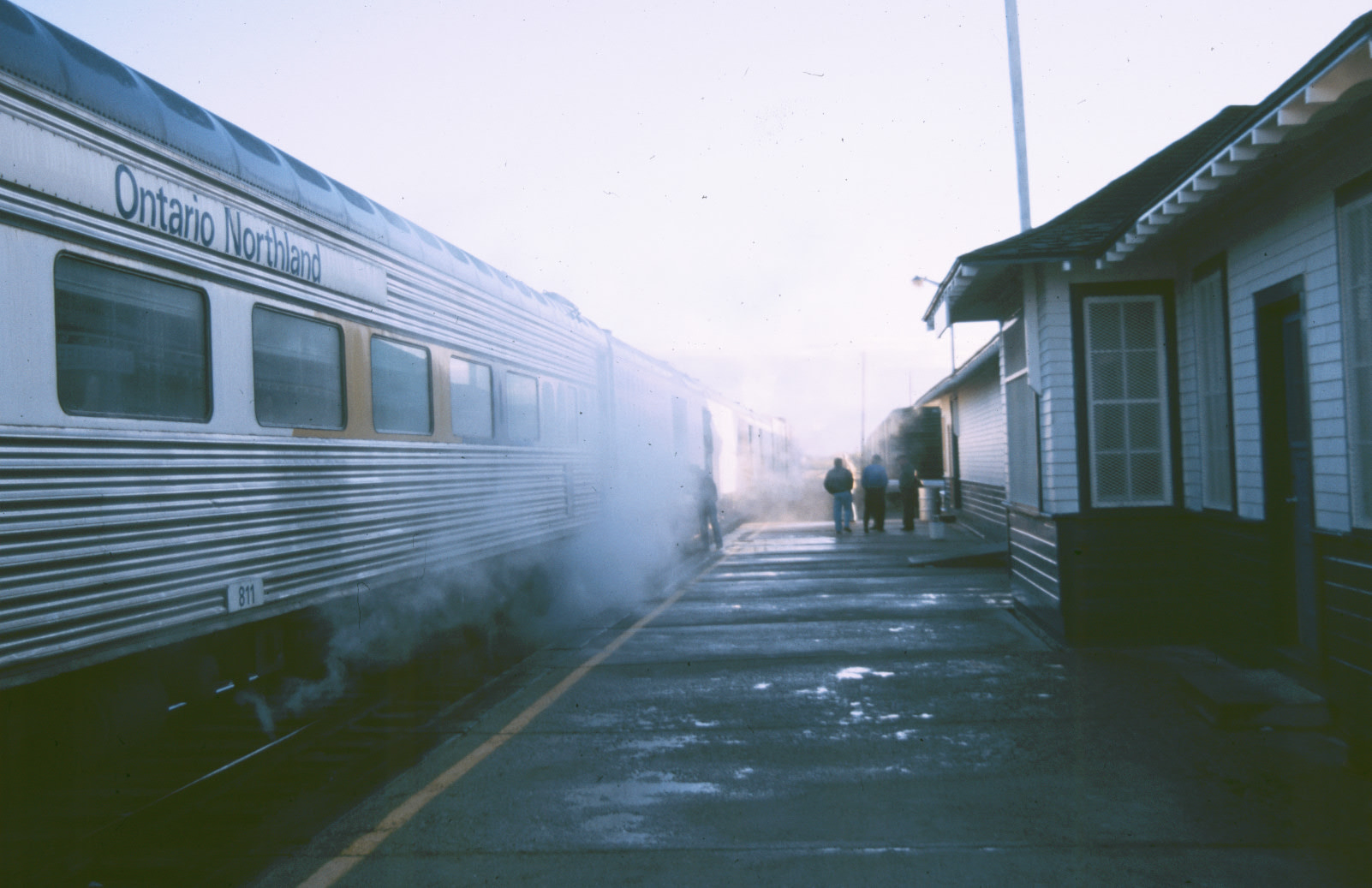
Moosonee rail station with Polar Bear Express train

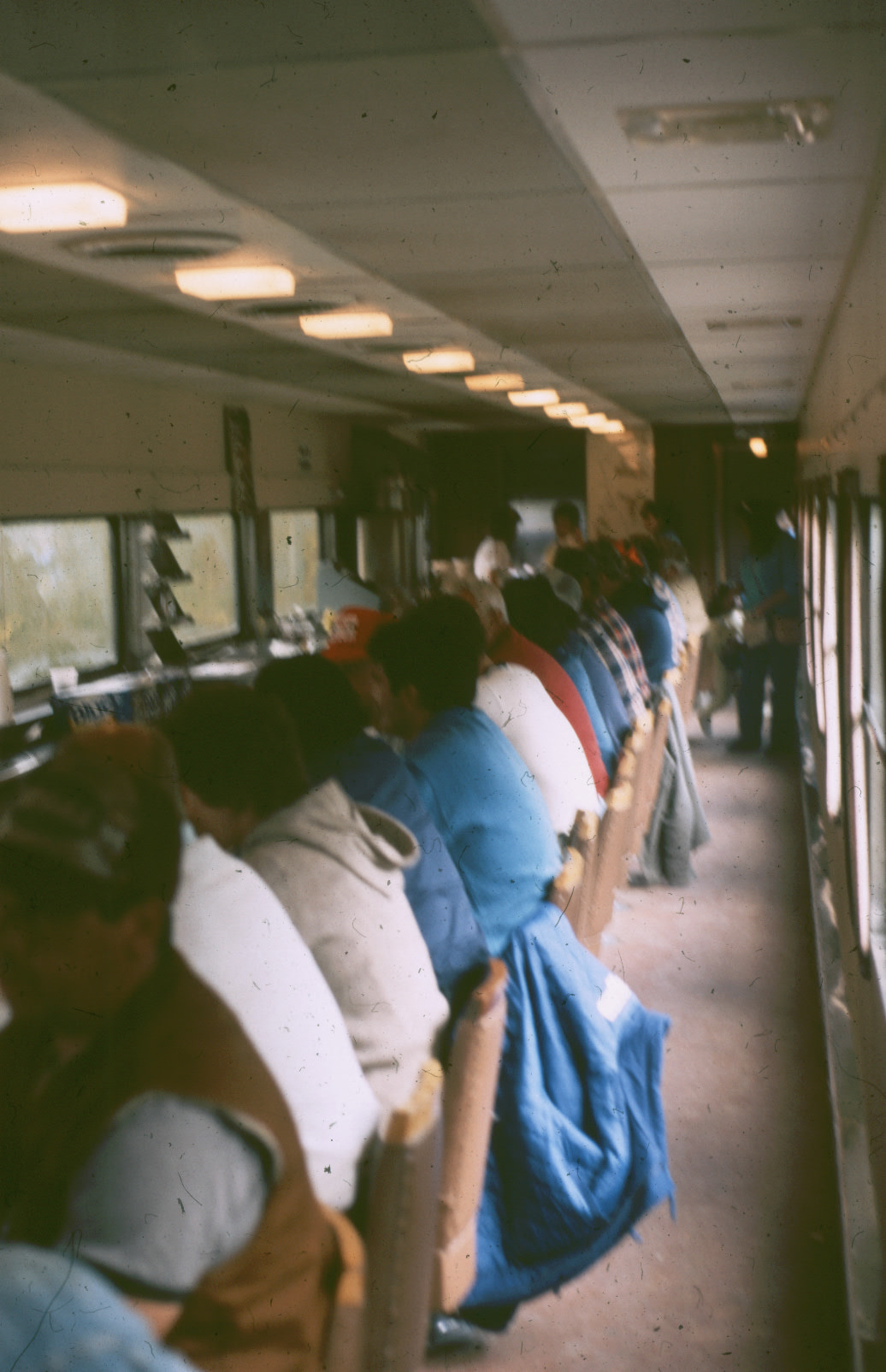
Dining (snack) car no longer in use

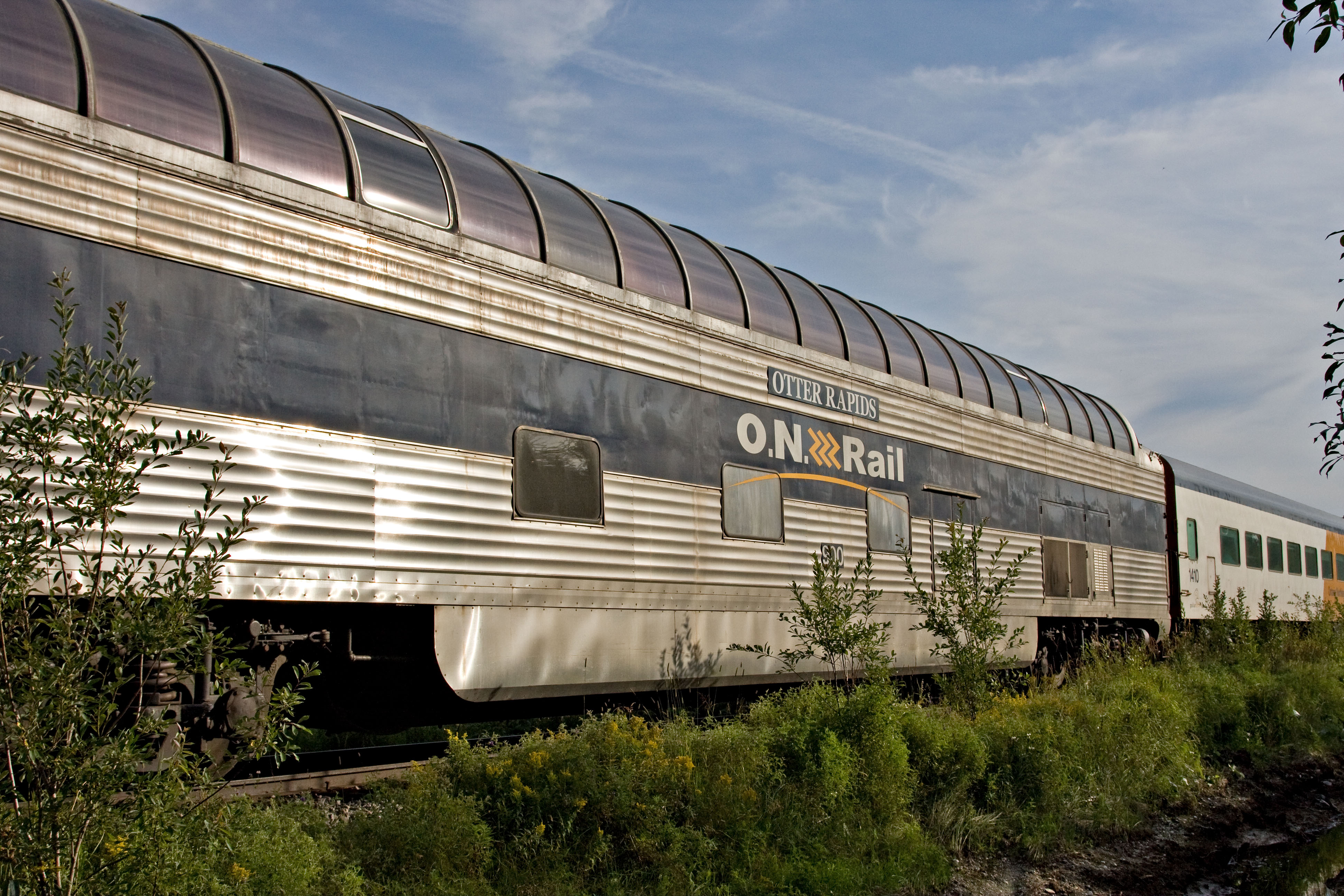
Full length dome car Otter Rapids

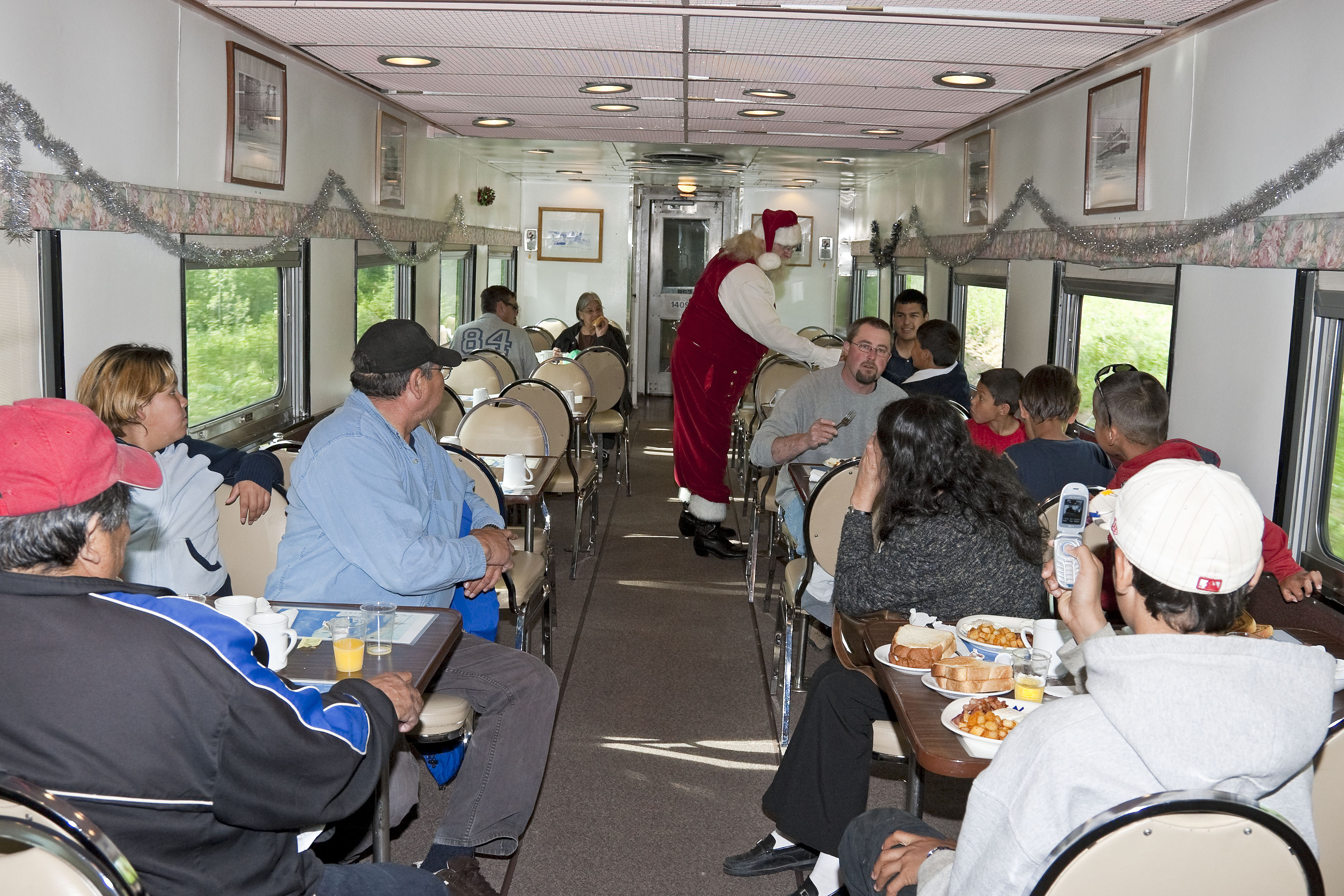
Dining car on Polar Bear Express - no longer carried

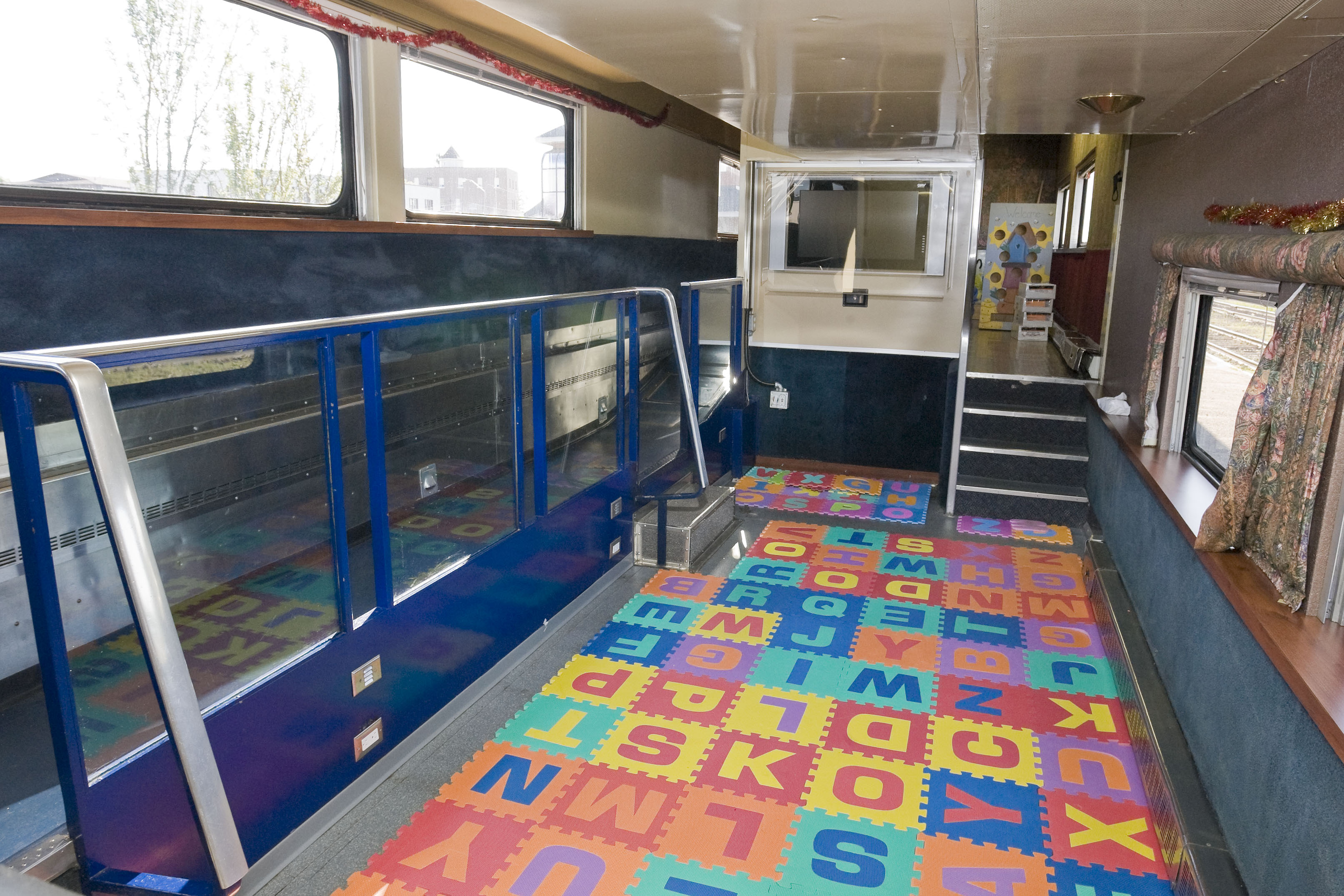
Children's play area - no longer carried

== See also ==
- Northlander
- Winnipeg–Churchill train
