= List of postal codes of Canada: P =

This is a list of postal codes in Canada where the first letter is P. Postal codes beginning with P are located within the Canadian province of Ontario. Only the first three characters are listed, corresponding to the Forward Sortation Area (FSA).

Canada Post provides a free postal code look-up tool on its website, via its applications for such smartphones as the iPhone and BlackBerry, and sells hard-copy directories and CD-ROMs. Many vendors also sell validation tools, which allow customers to properly match addresses and postal codes. Hard-copy directories can also be consulted in all post offices, and some libraries.

== Northern Ontario ==
There are currently 58 FSAs in this list.

=== Urban ===
P1A; North Bay (Ferris)	P2A; Parry Sound	P3A; Greater Sudbury (New Sudbury)	P4A; Not assigned	P5A; Elliot Lake	P6A; Sault Ste. Marie; East	P7A; Thunder Bay; Northeast	P8A; Not assigned	P9A; Fort Frances
P1B; North Bay; Central	P2B; Sturgeon Falls	P3B; Greater Sudbury (Downtown / Minnow Lake)	P4B; Not assigned	P5B; Not assigned	P6B; Sault Ste. Marie; Central	P7B; Thunder Bay; North Central	P8B; Not assigned	P9B; Not assigned
P1C; North Bay (Fricker, Wallace Heights)	P2C; Not assigned	P3C; Greater Sudbury (Gatchell / West End / Little Britain)	P4C; Not assigned	P5C; Not assigned	P6C; Sault Ste. Marie; North	P7C; Thunder Bay; Central	P8C; Not assigned	P9C; Not assigned
P1E; Not assigned	P2E; Not assigned	P3E; Greater Sudbury (Robinson / Lockerby)	P4E; Not assigned	P5E; Espanola	P6E; Not assigned	P7E; Thunder Bay; South Central	P8E; Not assigned	P9E; Not assigned
P1G; Not assigned	P2G; Not assigned	P3G; Greater Sudbury (Lo-Ellen / McFarlane Lake)	P4G; Not assigned	P5G; Not assigned	P6G; Not assigned	P7G; Thunder Bay; North	P8G; Not assigned	P9G; Not assigned
P1H; Huntsville	P2H; Not assigned	P3H; Not assigned	P4H; Not assigned	P5H; Not assigned	P6H; Not assigned	P7H; Not assigned	P8H; Not assigned	P9H; Not assigned
P1J; Not assigned	P2J; Not assigned	P3J; Not assigned	P4J; Not assigned	P5J; Not assigned	P6J; Not assigned	P7J; Thunder Bay; South	P8J; Not assigned	P9J; Not assigned
P1K; Not assigned	P2K; Not assigned	P3K; Not assigned	P4K; Not assigned	P5K; Not assigned	P6K; Not assigned	P7K; Thunder Bay; West	P8K; Not assigned	P9K; Not assigned
P1L; Bracebridge	P2L; Not assigned	P3L; Greater Sudbury (Garson)	P4L; Not assigned	P5L; Not assigned	P6L; Not assigned	P7L; Neebing	P8L; Not assigned	P9L; Not assigned
P1M; Not assigned	P2M; Not assigned	P3M; Not assigned	P4M; Not assigned	P5M; Not assigned	P6M; Not assigned	P7M; Not assigned	P8M; Not assigned	P9M; Not assigned
P1N; Not assigned	P2N; Kirkland Lake	P3N; Greater Sudbury (Val Caron)	P4N; Timmins; Southeast	P5N; Kapuskasing	P6N; Not assigned	P7N; Not assigned	P8N; Dryden	P9N; Kenora
P1P; Gravenhurst	P2P; Not assigned	P3P; Greater Sudbury (Hanmer)	P4P; Timmins; North	P5P; Not assigned	P6P; Not assigned	P7P; Not assigned	P8P; Not assigned	P9P; Not assigned
P1R; Not assigned	P2R; Not assigned	P3R; Not assigned	P4R; Timmins; West	P5R; Not assigned	P6R; Not assigned	P7R; Not assigned	P8R; Not assigned	P9R; Not assigned
P1S; Not assigned	P2S; Not assigned	P3S; Not assigned	P4S; Not assigned	P5S; Not assigned	P6S; Not assigned	P7S; Not assigned	P8S; Not assigned	P9S; Not assigned
P1T; Not assigned	P2T; Not assigned	P3T; Not assigned	P4T; Not assigned	P5T; Not assigned	P6T; Not assigned	P7T; Not assigned	P8T; Sioux Lookout	P9T; Not assigned
P1V; Not assigned	P2V; Not assigned	P3V; Not assigned	P4V; Not assigned	P5V; Not assigned	P6V; Not assigned	P7V; Not assigned	P8V; Not assigned	P9V; Not assigned
P1W; Not assigned	P2W; Not assigned	P3W; Not assigned	P4W; Not assigned	P5W; Not assigned	P6W; Not assigned	P7W; Not assigned	P8W; Not assigned	P9W; Not assigned
P1X; Not assigned	P2X; Not assigned	P3X; Not assigned	P4X; Not assigned	P5X; Not assigned	P6X; Not assigned	P7X; Not assigned	P8X; Not assigned	P9X; Not assigned
P1Y; Not assigned	P2Y; Not assigned	P3Y; Greater Sudbury (Lively)	P4Y; Not assigned	P5Y; Not assigned	P6Y; Not assigned	P7Y; Not assigned	P8Y; Not assigned	P9Y; Not assigned
P1Z; Not assigned	P2Z; Not assigned	P3Z; Not assigned	P4Z; Not assigned	P5Z; Not assigned	P6Z; Not assigned	P7Z; Not assigned	P8Z; Not assigned	P9Z; Not assigned

=== Rural ===
P0A
Parry Sound - Almaguin Highlands

1A0: Ahmic Harbour
1C0: Burks Falls
1E0: Dorset
1G0: Dunchurch
1H0: Dwight
1J0: Emsdale
1L0: Katrine
1M0: Kearney
1P0: Magnetawan
1R0: Novar
1X0: South River
1Y0: Sprucedale
1Z0: Sundridge

P0B
Muskoka

1A0: Baysville
1E0: Milford Bay
1G0: Minett
1J0: Port Carling
1K0: Port Sandfield
1L0: Port Sydney
1M0: Utterson
1P0: Windermere

P0C
Muskoka West

1A0: Bala
1H0: Mactier
1J0: Rosseau
1M0: Torrance

P0E
Muskoka South

1E0: Honey Harbour
1G0: Kilworthy
1N0: Severn Bridge

P0G
Parry Sound North Shore

1A0: Britt
1B0: Byng Inlet
1C0: McKellar
1G0: Nobel
1J0: Pickerel
1K0: Pointe-au-Baril Station

P0H
Nipissing

1A0: Arnstein
1B0: Astorville
1C0: Bear Island
1E0: Bonfield
1G0: Cache Bay
1H0: Callander
1J0: Commanda
1K0: Corbeil
1L0: Crystal Falls
1M0: Field
1N0: Golden Valley
1P0: Hornell Heights
1R0: Lavigne
1S0: Loring
1T0: Marten River
1V0: Mattawa
1W0: Nipissing
1Y0: Port Loring
1Z0: Powassan
2A0: Redbridge
2C0: River Valley
2E0: Rutherglen
2H0: Temagami
2J0: Thorne
2K0: Tilden Lake
2L0: Trout Creek
2M0: Verner
2N0: Warren
2R0: Restoule

P0J
Timiskaming South

1A0: Belle Vallee
1B0: Charlton
1C0: Cobalt
1E0: Earlton
1G0: Elk Lake
1H0: Englehart
1J0: Gowganda
1K0: Haileybury
1L0: Hilliardton
1M0: Kenabeek
1N0: Latchford
1P0: New Liskeard
1R0: North Cobalt
1S0: Thornloe

P0K
Timiskaming North

1A0: Chaput Hughes
1B0: Dobie
1C0: Holtyre
1E0: Iroquois Falls
1G0: Iroquois Falls A
1J0: Kearns
1K0: King Kirkland
1L0: Larder Lake
1M0: Matachewan
1N0: Matheson
1P0: Monteith
1R0: Ramore
1S0: Sesekinika
1T0: Swastika
1V0: Tarzwell
1W0: Val Gagné
1X0: Virginiatown

P0L
Cochrane District

1A0: Attawapiskat
1B0: Constance Lake
1C0: Cochrane
1E0: Driftwood
1G0: Fauquier
1H0: Fort Albany
1K0: Frederickhouse
1L0: Hallebourg
1M0: Harty
1N0: Hearst
1P0: Hunta
1R0: Jogues
1S0: Kashechewan
1T0: Mattice
1V0: Moonbeam
1W0: Moose Factory
1Y0: Moosonee
1Z0: Opasatika
2B0: Smooth Rock Falls
2C0: Strickland
2E0: Val Cote
2G0: Val Rita
2H0: Peawanuck
2P0: Oba

P0M
Algoma, Sudbury District and Rural Greater Sudbury

1A0: Alban
1B0: Azilda
1C0: Biscotasing
1E0: Blezard Valley
1H0: Capreol
1J0: Cartier
1K0: Chapleau
1L0: Chelmsford
1M0: Coniston
1N0: Copper Cliff
1P0: Chelmsford
1R0: Dowling
1S0: Falconbridge
1T0: Foleyet
1W0: Gogama
1X0: Hagar
1Z0: Hornepayne
2A0: Killarney
2C0: Levack
2G0: Markstay
2H0: Missanabie
2J0: Mobert
2K0: Monetville
2L0: Nairn Centre
2M0: Naughton
2N0: Noelville
2R0: Onaping
2S0: Ramsey
2W0: St Charles
2X0: Shining Tree
2Y0: Skead
2Z0: Sultan
3C0: Wahnapitae
3E0: Whitefish
3G0: White River
3H0: Worthington

P0N
Timmins Region

1A0: Connaught
1C0: Porcupine
1E0: Porquis Junction
1G0: Schumacher
1H0: South Porcupine
1J0: Tunis
1K0: Porcupine

P0P
Manitoulin

1A0: Birch Island
1B0: Cutler
1E0: Evansville
1G0: M'Chigeeng
1H0: Gore Bay
1J0: Kagawong
1K0: Little Current
1M0: McKerrow
1N0: Manitowaning
1P0: Massey
1R0: Meldrum Bay
1S0: Mindemoya
1T0: Providence Bay
1V0: Serpent River
1W0: Sheguiandah
1X0: Sheshegwaning
1Y0: Silver Water
1Z0: South Baymouth
2A0: Spanish
2B0: Spring Bay
2C0: Tehkummah
2E0: Walford Station
2G0: Webbwood
2H0: Whitefish Falls
2J0: Wikwemikong
2L0: Sagamok

P0R
Algoma Southwest

1A0: Algoma Mills
1B0: Blind River
1C0: Bruce Mines
1E0: Desbarats
1G0: Hilton Beach
1H0: Iron Bridge
1J0: Richards Landing
1K0: Spragge
1L0: Thessalon

P0S
Lake Superior East Shore

1A0: Batchawana Bay
1B0: Dubreuilville
1C0: Echo Bay
1E0: Goulais River
1G0: Hawk Junction
1H0: Montreal River Harbour
1J0: Searchmont
1K0: Wawa

P0T
Lake Superior North Shore

1A0: Armstrong Station
1B0: Aroland
1C0: Atikokan
1G0: Beardmore
1J0: Caramat
1K0: Dorion
1L0: Eabamet Lake
1M0: Geraldton
1N0: Graham
1P0: Gull Bay
1R0: Heron Bay
1T0: Ignace
1V0: Jellicoe
1W0: Kakabeka Falls
1X0: Kaministiquia
1Y0: Kashabowie
1Z0: Lansdowne House
2A0: Longlac
2B0: Macdiarmid
2C0: Manitouwadge
2E0: Marathon
2G0: Murillo
2H0: Nakina
2J0: Nipigon
2K0: Nolalu
2L0: Ogoki
2M0: Pass Lake
2N0: Raith
2P0: Red Rock
2R0: Rossport
2S0: Schreiber
2T0: Shebandowan
2V0: South Gillies
2W0: Terrace Bay
2Y0: Upsala
3A0: Webequie
3B0: Summer Beaver
3C0: Pays Plat
3E0: Collins

P0V
Northwestern Ontario

1B0: Angling Lake
1C0: Balmertown
1E0: Bearskin Lake
1G0: Big Trout Lake
1J0: Cat Lake
1L0: Cochenour
1N0: Deer Lake
1P0: Dinorwic
1S0: Eagle River
1T0: Ear Falls
1V0: Sandy Lake
1W0: Fort Severn
1X0: Hudson
1Y0: Kasabonika
1Z0: Kingfisher Lake
2A0: Lac Seul
2B0: McKenzie Island
2C0: Madsen
2E0: Minnitaki
2G0: North Spirit Lake
2H0: Osnaburgh House
2J0: Oxdrift
2K0: Perrault Falls
2L0: Pikangikum
2M0: Red Lake
2P0: Sachigo Lake
2S0: Savant Lake
2V0: Vermilion Bay
2W0: Wabigoon
2X0: Waldhof
2Y0: Weagamow Lake
2Z0: Wunnumin Lake
3A0: Pickle Lake
3B0: Muskrat Dam
3C0: Slate Falls
3E0: Poplar Hill
3G0: Keewaywin
3H0: Migisi Sahgaigan

P0W
Rainy River Region

1A0: Barwick
1C0: Devlin
1E0: Emo
1H0: Mine Centre
1J0: Morson
1K0: Pinewood
1L0: Rainy River
1M0: Sleeman
1N0: Stratton

P0X
Kenora Region

1B0: Grassy Narrows
1C0: Keewatin
1E0: Kejick
1H0: Longbow Lake
1J0: Minaki
1K0: Nestor Falls
1L0: Pawitik
1M0: Redditt
1N0: Sioux Narrows
1P0: Whitedog
1S0: Clearwater Bay

P0Y
Whiteshell Park Region

1A0: Ingolf

P0Z
Not in use

== Most populous FSAs ==
1. P0M, 49,727
2. P6A, 33,800
3. P1B, 33,113
4. P0T, 32,000
5. P0H, 31,909

== Least populous FSAs ==
1. P0Y, 96
2. P7L, 2,188
3. P4P, 3,232
4. P1C, 3,371
5. P0G, 3,553
