= Remi Lake =

Lake in Cochrane District, Ontario, Canada

Remi Lake (Jods Lake)
- lac Rémi
- Location in Ontario
- Location: Cochrane District, Ontario
- Coordinates: 49°25′24″N 82°10′33″W
- Part of: James Bay drainage basin
- Primary inflows: Kitigan River
- Primary outflows: Remi River
- Basin countries: Canada
- Max. length: 8.8 km (5.5 mi)
- Max. width: 5.2 km (3.2 mi)
- Surface elevation: 226 m (741 ft)

Rémi Lake (French: lac Rémi) is a lake in both the municipality of Moonbeam and geographic Gurney Township in Unorganized North Cochrane District, Cochrane District, in Northeastern Ontario, Canada. It is in the James Bay drainage basin.

The primary inflow is the Kitigan River at Kitigan Bay at the west. Secondary inflows are Beaver Creek at the south, and Spruce Creek at Round Bay at the northeast. The primary outflow is the Remi River from Outlet Bay at the northwest. The Remi River flows via the Kapuskasing River, the Mattagami River and the Moose River to James Bay.

René Brunelle Provincial Park is along the north and east shores of the lake; the park can be accessed by Ontario Highway 581 which connects to Ontario Highway 11. Other local roads provide access to the southern shores of the lake.

Remi Lake also has many other campgrounds such as the provincial one, Twin Lakes, Lakeside, the Trailer Park, and Holiday Bay.

== See also ==
- List of lakes in Ontario
