= Kitigan River =

- Location of the mouth of the river in Ontario

Location
- Country: Canada
- Province: Ontario
- Region: Northeastern Ontario
- District: Cochrane
- Municipality: Moonbeam

Physical characteristics
- Source: unnamed wetland
  - coordinates: 49°20′54″N 82°14′20″W
  - elevation: 257 m (843 ft)
- Mouth: Remi Lake
  - coordinates: 49°25′23″N 82°12′02″W
  - elevation: 226 m (741 ft)

Basin features
- River system: James Bay drainage basin

The Kitigan River is a river in the municipality of Moonbeam, Cochrane District in Northeastern Ontario, Canada. It is in the James Bay drainage basin and is a tributary of Remi Lake.

== Course ==
The river begins at an unnamed wetland and flows north, then passes under Ontario Highway 11 and the Ontario Northland Railway. It continues north, turns west, then heads northeast and reaches its mouth at Kitigan Bay on the west shore of Remi Lake. The lake flows via the Remi River, the Kapuskasing River, the Mattagami River and the Moose River to James Bay.
