= Ontario Highway 67 =

Ontario provincial highway

Highway 67
- Highway 67 highlighted in red

Route information
- Maintained by the Ministry of Transportation of Ontario
- Length: 9.8 km (6.1 mi)
- Existed: June 30, 1937–present

Major junctions
- South end: Highway 11 – Porquis Junction
- North end: De Troyes Avenue in Iroquois Falls

Location
- Country: Canada
- Province: Ontario

Highway system
- Ontario provincial highways; Current; Former; 400-series
← Highway 66	→ Highway 69
Former provincial highways
Highway 68 →

King's Highway 67, commonly referred to as Highway 67, is a provincially maintained highway in the northern portion of the Canadian province of Ontario that connects Highway 11 at Porquis Junction with the town of Iroquois Falls. The two-laned highway is 10.9 kilometres (6.8 mi) long and passes through farmland and swamps en route to the town. Highway 67 was assumed by the Department of Highways in 1937, shortly after the Department of Northern Development merged with it that year. The route originally extended south of Highway 11 to Highway 101 west of Timmins, but this portion was decommissioned as a provincial highway in 1998.

== Route description ==
Highway 67 currently travels from Highway 11 at Porquis Junction to the community of Iroquois Falls, where it connects with the former Highway 577 and Highway 578. The 10.9-kilometre (6.8 mi) route is predominantly rural, ending at the urban centre of Iroquois Falls. Aside from that town, the only other community on the two-laned route is Porquis Junction. The length of Highway 67 is 9.8 km (6.1 mi), located entirely within Cochrane District.

The highway begins at Highway 11 just northwest of Porquis Junction, travelling east and immediately crossing a railway track before curving north. It turn to the northeast and travels southeast of and parallel to another railway for almost the entirety of its journey. Although there is some farmland alongside the highway south of Brousseau Road, the portion north of it is dominated by swampland. In the centre of these swamps lies the small hamlet of Onagon, shortly after which the highway enters Iroquois Falls as Ambridge Drive. At Main Street, the route turns east and diverges from the railway, passing through the downtown portion of Iroquois Falls before ending at former Highway 578 on the eastern edge of the town.

Like other provincial routes in Ontario, Highway 67 is maintained by the Ministry of Transportation of Ontario. In 2010, traffic surveys conducted by the ministry along a single portion of the route showed that on average, 1,950 vehicles used the highway daily along the section between Highway 11 and the Iroquois Falls southwestern town limits.

== History ==
The Timmins – Iroquois Falls Road was first assumed by the Department of Highways on June 30, 1937, shortly after the merger with the Department of Northern Development, at a length of 67.6 kilometres (42.0 mi). At that time, the highway travelled along a portion of what is now Highway 101 west of Timmins. The construction of highway 101 during the mid-1950s resulted in Highway 67 being truncated to a junction between Hoyle and Shillington. The route was also diverted onto the Barbers Bay Cutoff; the old routing was redesignated as Highway 610. Between then and 1997, the highway was 35.5 kilometres (22.1 mi) long.

However, budget constraints brought on by a recession in the 1990s resulted in the Mike Harris provincial government forming the Who Does What? committee to determine cost-cutting measures in order to balance the budget after a deficit incurred by former premier Bob Rae. It was determined that many Ontario highways no longer serve long-distance traffic movement and should therefore be maintained by local or regional levels of government. The MTO consequently transferred many highways to lower levels of government in 1997 and 1998, removing a significant percentage of the provincial highway network. On January 1, 1998, 24.6 kilometres (15.3 mi) of Highway 67 was transferred to Cochrane District, leaving only the section between Highway 11 and Iroquois Falls. The section between Highway 101 and Highway 11 is now known as Municipal Road and Jack Pine Road.

== Major intersections ==
The following table lists the major junctions along Highway 67, as noted by the Ministry of Transportation of Ontario. The entire route is located in Cochrane District.

Location	km	mi	Destinations	Notes
Unorganized Cochrane District	0.0	0.0	Highway 11 / TCH – Cochrane, Kirkland Lake	
Iroquois Falls	8.3	5.2		Beginning of Iroquois Falls connecting link agreement
Iroquois Falls	10.9	6.8	De Troyes Avenue	End of Iroquois Falls connecting link agreement; becomes Monteith Road; formerly Highway 578
1.000 mi = 1.609 km; 1.000 km = 0.621 mi
