= List of secondary highways in Cochrane District =

List of Ontario secondary highways

This is a list of secondary highways in Cochrane District, most of which serve as logging roads, mine and dam access roads, or provide access to isolated and sparsely populated areas in the Cochrane District of northeastern Ontario.

== Highway 572 ==
Highway 572

Route information
- Maintained by Ministry of Transportation of Ontario
- Length: 16.5 km (10.3 mi)
- Existed: May 9, 1956–present

Major junctions
- South end: Highway 11 in Ramore
- North end: Highway 101 east of Matheson

Location
- Country: Canada
- Province: Ontario
- Districts: Cochrane District

Highway system
- Ontario provincial highways; Current; Former; 400-series
← Highway 571	→ Highway 573

Secondary Highway 572, commonly referred to as Highway 572, is a secondary highway in the Canadian province of Ontario which acts as a convenient short-cut for drivers travelling from Highway 11/Trans Canada Highway-northbound to Highway 101-eastbound, and vice versa. By taking this road, one reduces the length of their trip by 14 kilometres (8.7 mi).

== Highway 574 ==
Highway 574

Route information
- Maintained by Ministry of Transportation of Ontario
- Length: 15.9 km (9.9 mi)
- Existed: May 9, 1956–present

Major junctions
- South end: Fox Concession Road 2 at Norembega
- North end: Highway 652 near Brower

Location
- Country: Canada
- Province: Ontario
- Districts: Cochrane District

Highway system
- Ontario provincial highways; Current; Former; 400-series
← Highway 573	→ Highway 575

Secondary Highway 574, commonly referred to as Highway 574, is a short connecting road from the community of Norembega to the intersection of Highway 652 near Brower, all in Unorganized Cochrane North Part Territory, Ontario, Canada.

== Highway 577 ==
Highway 577

Route information
- Maintained by Ministry of Transportation of Ontario
- Existed: May 9, 1956–present

Major junctions
- South end: Highway 101 at Shillington
- North end: Highway 11 near Monteith

Location
- Country: Canada
- Province: Ontario
- Districts: Cochrane District

Highway system
- Ontario provincial highways; Current; Former; 400-series
← Highway 575	→ Highway 579
Former provincial highways
← Highway 576	Highway 578 →

Secondary Highway 577, commonly referred to as Highway 577, is a secondary highway in Northern Ontario connecting Iroquois Falls, Ontario to Highway 11/Trans Canada Highway, and to Highway 101. This provides a very direct route for Timmins-Iroquois Falls traffic.

The road is 11 kilometres (6.8 mi) in length, but before the large 1998 highway downloading spree by the province, the road continued an additional 14 kilometres (8.7 mi) into Iroquois Falls, terminating at an intersection with Highway 67 (which was concurrent with Highway 578, another downloaded highway).

== Highway 578 ==

Highway 578 was a short spur road in Iroquois Falls that was transferred to that municipality on January 1, 1998. The road served to connect Iroquois Falls to Highway 11, the Trans Canada Highway, much like its sibling road, Highway 577 does. The road travelled along Victoria Road in Iroquois Falls, before terminating at Anson Drive.

== Highway 579 ==
Highway 579

Route information
- Maintained by Ministry of Transportation of Ontario
- Length: 31.2 km (19.4 mi)
- Existed: May 9, 1956–present

Major junctions
- South end: 5th Street / Western Avenue in Cochrane
- North end: Gardiner

Location
- Country: Canada
- Province: Ontario
- Districts: Cochrane District

Highway system
- Ontario provincial highways; Current; Former; 400-series
← Highway 577	→ Highway 580
Former provincial highways
← Highway 578

Secondary Highway 579, commonly referred to as Highway 579 is a secondary highway that travels north from 5th Street on the outskirts of Cochrane, north through the town of Clute to the Abitibi River, where an automobile ferry allows drivers and pedestrians to cross to the town of Gardiner (its northern terminus). The road is 31.2 kilometres (19.4 mi) in length, excluding a non-assumed section through Cochrane along 5th Street and 3rd Avenue to an intersection with Highway 11/Trans Canada Highway and Highway 652.

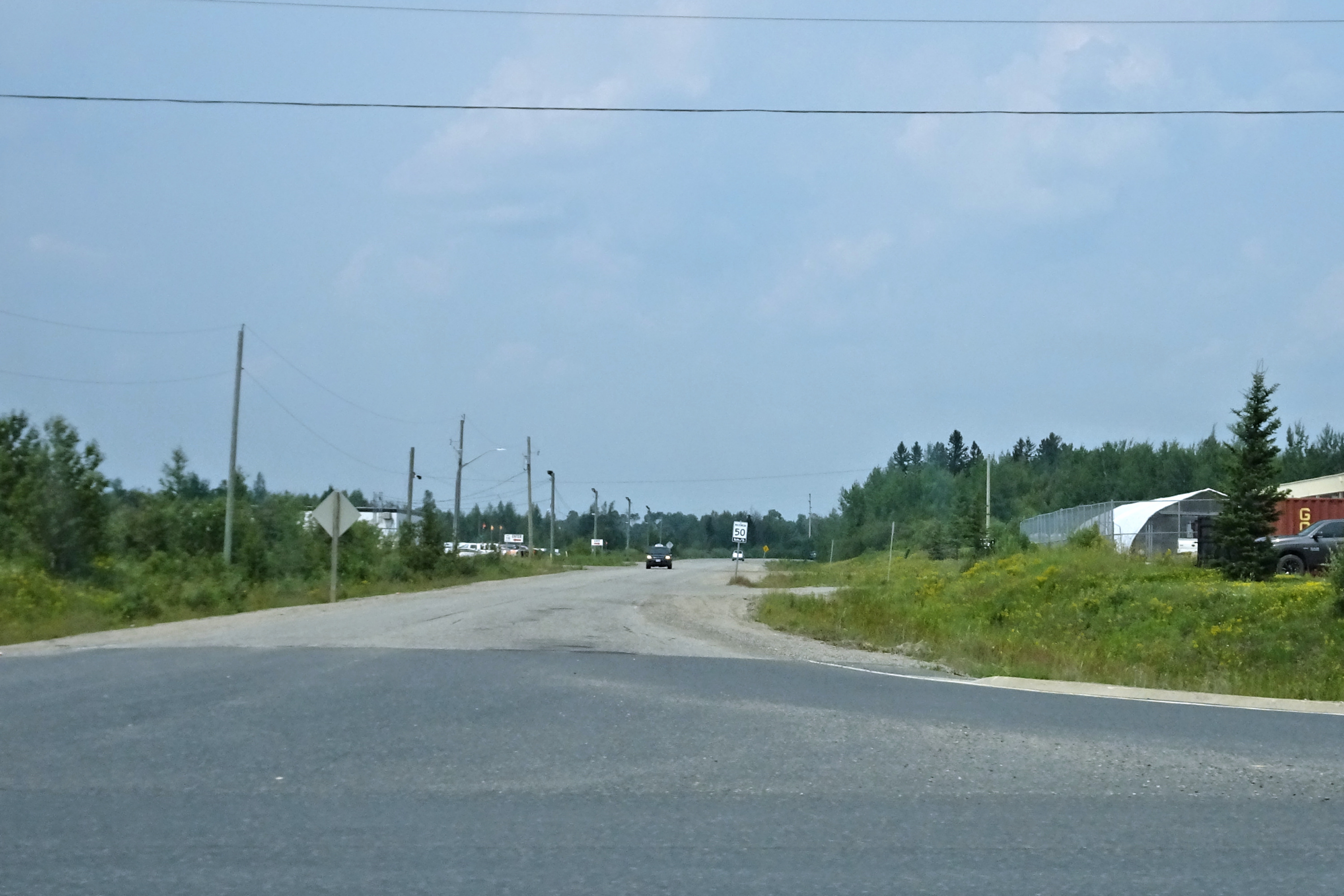
Terminus of Highway 579 at Cochrane

== Highway 581 ==
Highway 581

Route information
- Maintained by Ministry of Transportation of Ontario
- Length: 10.6 km (6.6 mi)
- Existed: 1956–present

Major junctions
- South end: Highway 11 in Moonbeam
- North end: René Brunelle Provincial Park

Location
- Country: Canada
- Province: Ontario
- Districts: Cochrane District
- Towns: Moonbeam

Highway system
- Ontario provincial highways; Current; Former; 400-series
← Highway 580	→ Highway 582

Secondary Highway 581, commonly referred to as Highway 581, is a secondary highway in the Canadian province of Ontario. Located within Cochrane District, the highway extends from Ontario Highway 11 in the community of Moonbeam north for 10.6 kilometres (6.6 mi) to the entrance of René Brunelle Provincial Park.

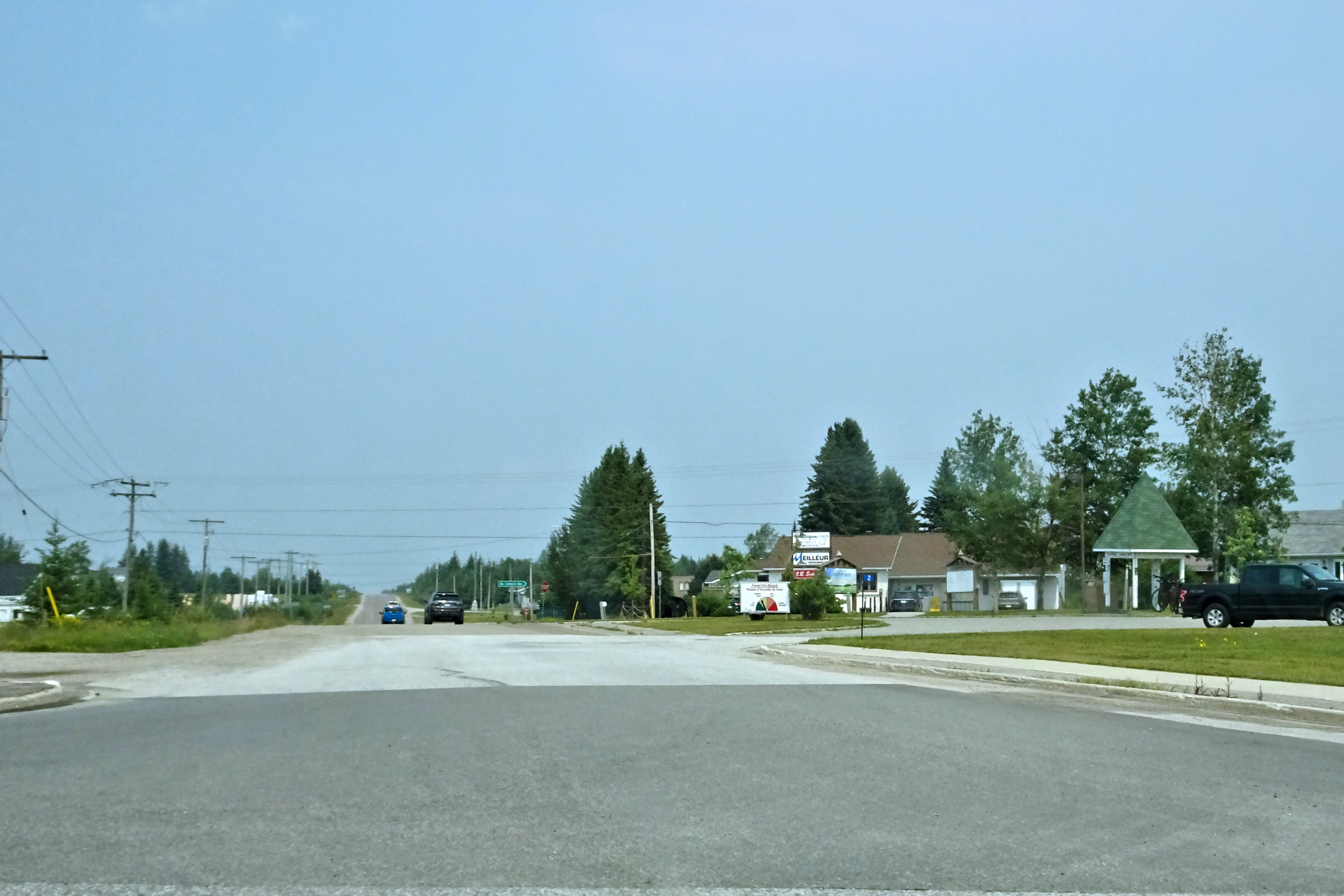
Terminus of Highway 581 in Moonbeam

== Highway 583 ==
Highway 583

Route information
- Maintained by Ministry of Transportation of Ontario
- Length: 39.2 km (24.4 mi)

Major junctions
- South end: Mead railway crossing
- Highway 11 at Hearst
- North end: Government dock at Lac-Sainte-Thérèse

Location
- Country: Canada
- Province: Ontario
- Districts: Cochrane District

Highway system
- Ontario provincial highways; Current; Former; 400-series
← Highway 582	→ Highway 584

Secondary Highway 583, commonly referred to as Highway 583, is a secondary highway in the Canadian province of Ontario. Located within Cochrane District, the highway extends from the community of Mead approximately 65 kilometres (40 mi) north to Lac-Sainte-Thérèse. En route, it passes through the communities of Coppell and Jogues, and intersects with Highway 11 in Hearst. The portion through the town of Hearst is not maintained by the Ministry of Transportation and separates the two halves of the highways by 9.5 km (5.9 mi). The portion south of Hearst to Mead is 31.1 km (19.3 mi) long, while the portion north of Mead to Lac-Sainte-Thérèse is 8.1 km (5.0 mi) long.

While the highway's designation ends at Mead, the roadway continues as a lower-grade rural road, which extends for 102 kilometres to meet Highway 631 at Hornepayne. A network of rural wilderness roads extending eastward from Jogues also connects the highway to Dubreuilville and portions of Missinaibi Provincial Park.

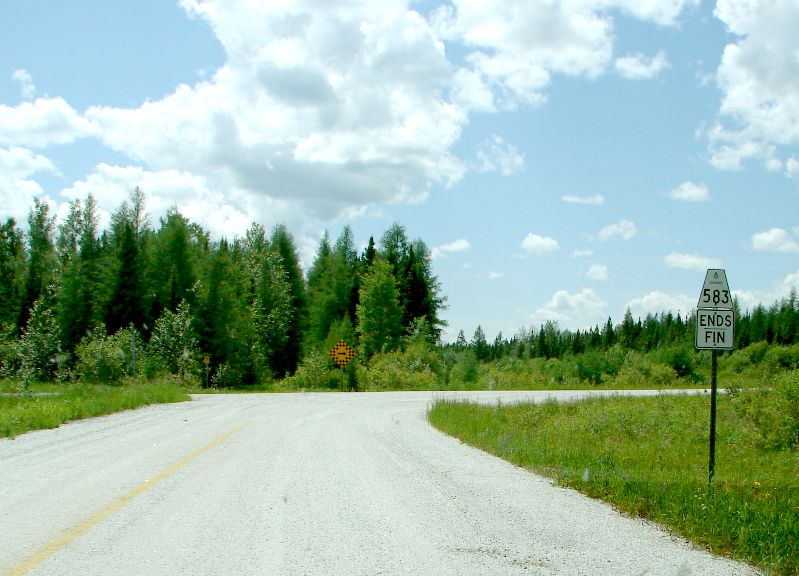
Southern terminus of highway 583 in Mead.

== Highway 626 ==
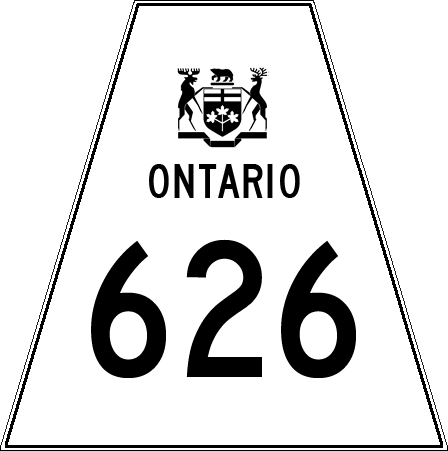

Secondary Highway 626, commonly referred to as Highway 626, was a former alignment of Highway 11 in Northern Ontario. The secondary highway started in Porquis Junction at Highway 67, and headed south, roughly a kilometre away from the main road, paralleling it for the entire length.

It travelled through the towns of Monteith, Val Gagné and Matheson, where it ended at Highway 101. The road used to continue south all the way to Highway 66 near Kirkland Lake, Ontario, but some of the pavement was removed, leaving only short dead-end streets off other roads. Highway 572 currently uses a tiny portion of Highway 626's former routing.

The road was transferred to local municipalities by the early 1990s. Another unrelated Highway 626 existed in Algoma District for 5 years. This Highway 626 ran from Highway 17 south to the town of Marathon. The road leading to Marathon was designated Highway 626 after the first Highway 626 was deleted. The highway was downloaded in 1998 and is known today as Peninsula Road.

== Highway 634 ==
Highway 634

Route information
- Maintained by Ministry of Transportation of Ontario
- Length: 80.3 km (49.9 mi)
- History: Opened July 21, 1966 (as Highway 807) renumbered in 1977 (as Highway 634)

Major junctions
- North end: Abitibi Canyon Generating Station at Abitibi Canyon, Ontario
- South end: Highway 11 in Smooth Rock Falls, Ontario

Location
- Country: Canada
- Province: Ontario
- Districts: Cochrane District
- Major cities: Smooth Rock Falls, Fraserdale

Highway system
- Ontario provincial highways; Current; Former; 400-series

Secondary Highway 634, commonly referred to as Highway 634, is a remote highway that travels through Northern Ontario from its southern terminus at Highway 11 in Smooth Rock Falls, Ontario to the Abitibi Canyon Generating Station at the community of Abitibi Canyon, Ontario.

It is the second highway in Ontario to be named Highway 634 (with the original Highway 634 being near Sudbury). Its original designation was Highway 807, but was renumbered in 1977, shortly after a route renumbering. The road was re-aligned around the eastern part of Smooth Rock Falls in the mid-1990s.

Although the 2003 Ontario Official Road Map shows the road as completely paved for its entire length, the northernmost 15 kilometres (9.3 mi) are gravel-surfaced. There are no gas stations on this road, aside from in Smooth Rock Falls.

== Highway 636 ==
Highway 636

Route information
- Maintained by Ministry of Transportation of Ontario
- Length: 4.8 km (3.0 mi)

Major junctions
- South end: Highway 11 near Cochrane
- North end: Clute Concession Road 6

Location
- Country: Canada
- Province: Ontario
- Districts: Cochrane District

Highway system
- Ontario provincial highways; Current; Former; 400-series
← Highway 634	→ Highway 637

Secondary Highway 636, commonly referred to as Highway 636, is a secondary highway in the Canadian province of Ontario. Located in the Cochrane District, the highway connects the community of Frederick to Highway 11 just outside Cochrane.

== Highway 652 ==
Highway 652

Route information
- Maintained by Ministry of Transportation of Ontario
- Length: 149.9 km (93.1 mi)
- Existed: July 6, 1964–present

Major junctions
- South end: Cochrane east limits at North Road
- North end: Kattawagami River bridge

Location
- Country: Canada
- Province: Ontario
- Districts: Cochrane District
- Major cities: Cochrane

Highway system
- Ontario provincial highways; Current; Former; 400-series

Secondary Highway 652, commonly referred to as Highway 652, is a long and extremely desolate secondary highway in far Northeastern Ontario. It is one of the most isolated highways in North America, stretching 149.9 km (93.1 mi) from Cochrane into boreal forest to a mine at Detour Lake.

As of 2019, the entire route is paved. There are no settlements of any kind along the route except for the southern terminus of Cochrane. No services are available along the route.

- Southern terminus: Highway 11 intersection in Cochrane
- Northern terminus: Entrance to the Detour Lake Mine (becomes a private road)

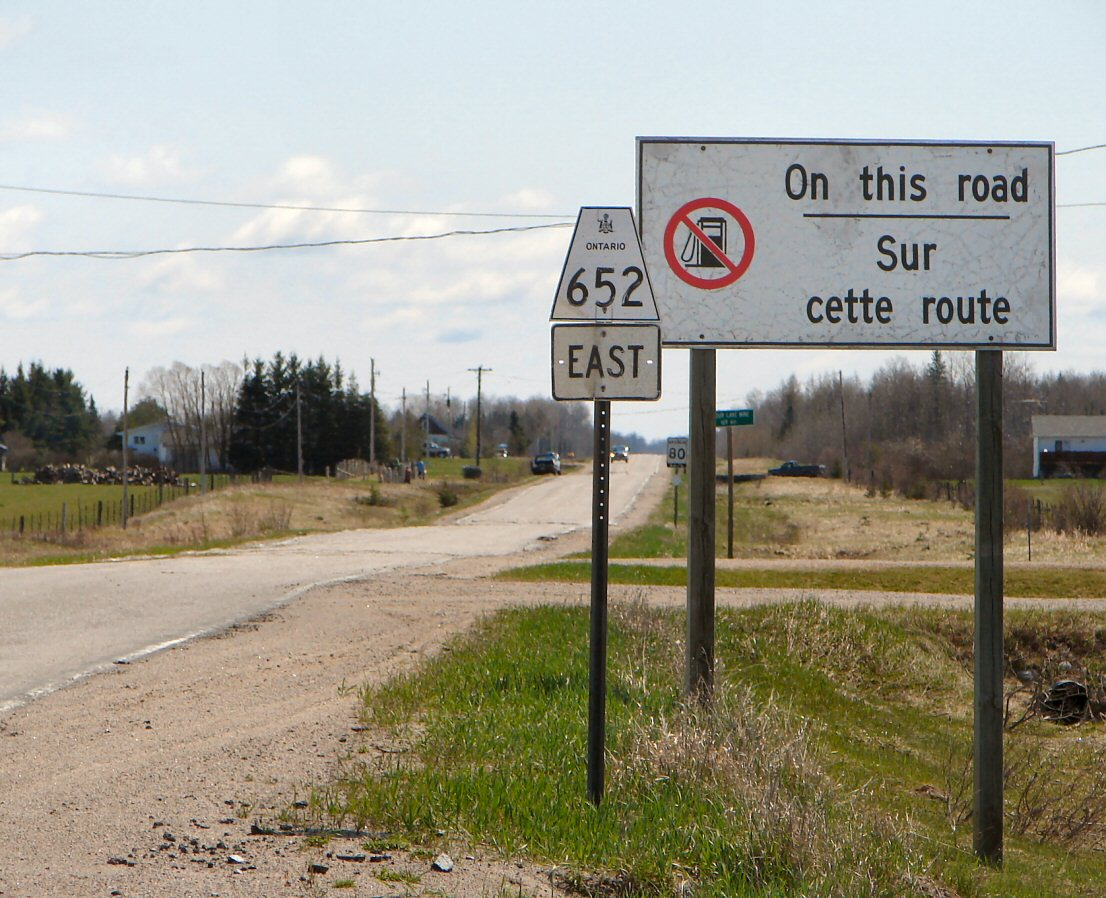
There is no fuel available along Hwy 652.

== Highway 655 ==
Highway 655
- Kidd Creek (Texas Gulf) Highway

Route information
- Maintained by Ministry of Transportation of Ontario
- Length: 75.1 km (46.7 mi)
- Existed: (Original length) 1965 (Current length) 1979–present

Major junctions
- South end: Highway 101 in Timmins
- North end: Highway 11 near Driftwood

Location
- Country: Canada
- Province: Ontario
- Districts: Cochrane District
- Major cities: Timmins

Highway system
- Ontario provincial highways; Current; Former; 400-series
← Highway 654	→ Highway 656

Secondary Highway 655, commonly referred to as Highway 655, is a secondary highway in the Cochrane District in Northern Ontario. The highway is about 75 kilometres (47 mi) long. It is heavily used by trucks as a critical access road to Timmins. The highway is one of the widest (by lane width), best-maintained secondary highways in the north (more comparable to a Kings Highway), and has the distinction of being Ontario's only secondary highway that features a 90 km/h (55 mph) speed limit, due to its importance and high design standards.

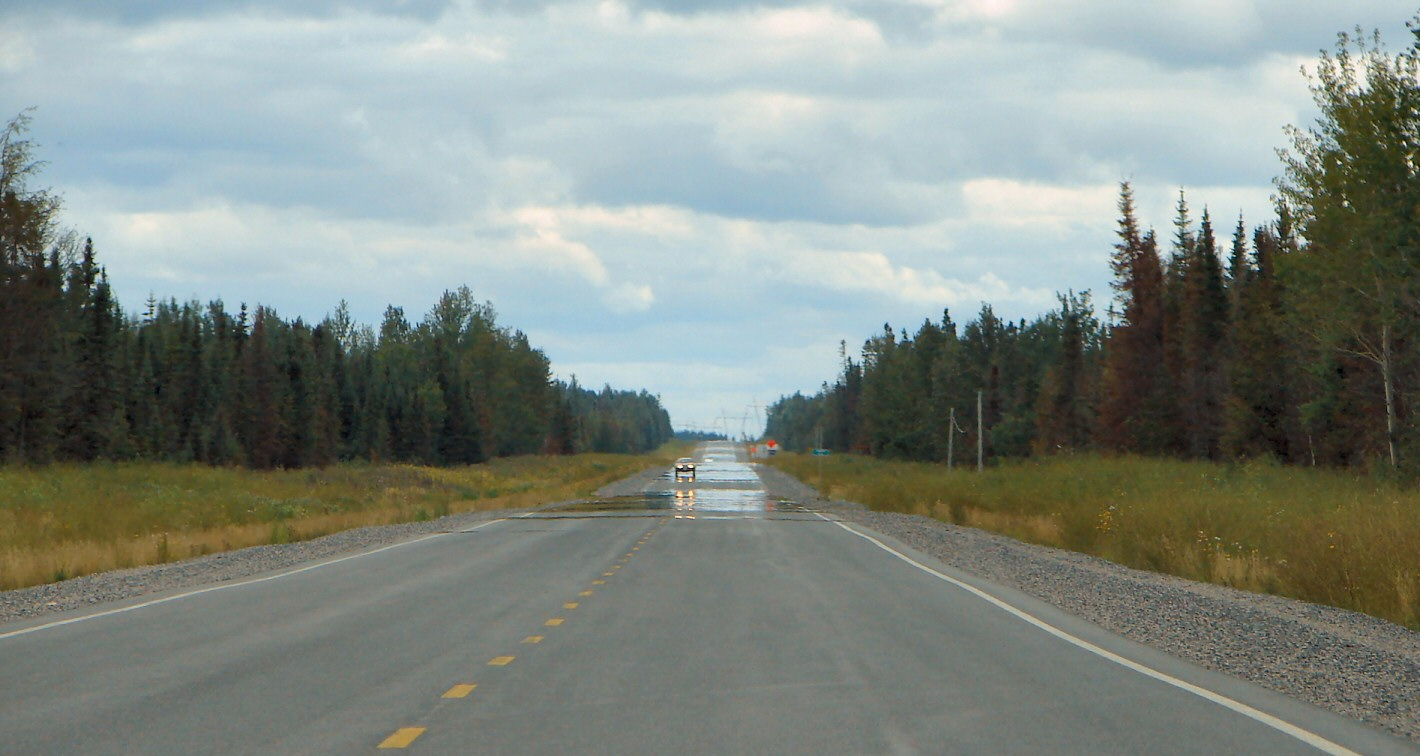
Highway 655 is straight and flat.

== Highway 663 ==
Secondary Highway 663, commonly referred to as Highway 663, is a short secondary highway in the Canadian province of Ontario, which links Highway 11 to the community of Calstock in the Cochrane District.

While the highway designation ends in Calstock, the roadway continues for several more kilometres through and past the Constance Lake First Nation.
