= Coppell, Ontario =

Coppell
- dispersed rural community Unincorporated area
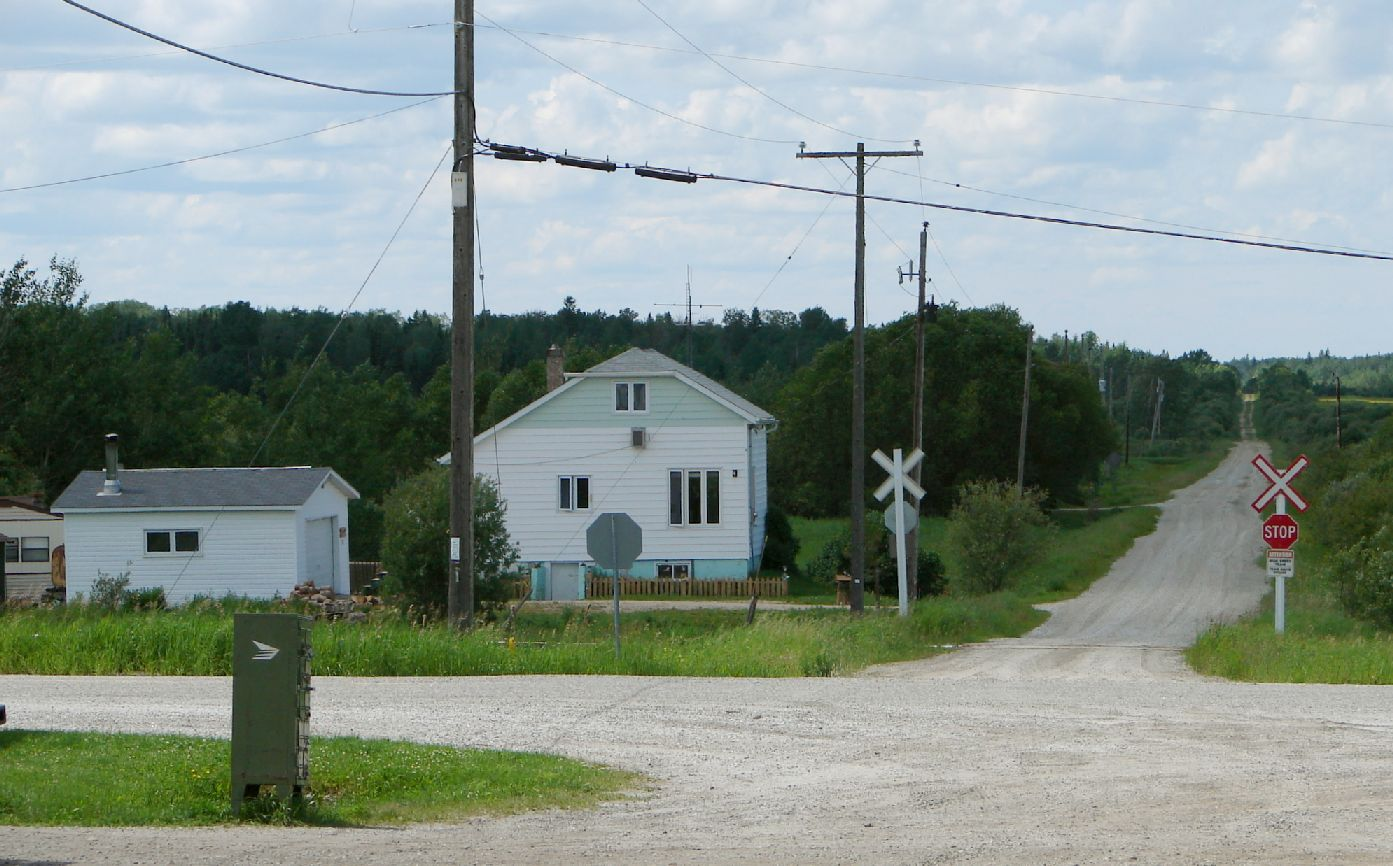
- Coppell and the Algoma Central Railway

- Location in Ontario
- Coordinates: 49°32′10″N 83°49′45″W
- Country: Canada
- Province: Ontario
- District: Cochrane
- Geographic Township: Lowther
- Elevation: 280 m (920 ft)
- Time zone: UTC-5 (Eastern Time Zone)
  - Summer (DST): UTC-4 (Eastern Time Zone)
- Postal Code: P0L
- Area codes: 705, 249

Coppell is a dispersed rural community and unincorporated place in geographic Lowther Township, Cochrane District in Northeastern Ontario, Canada. It is about 22 kilometres (14 mi) southwest of Hearst, and is counted as part of Unorganized Cochrane North Part in Canadian census data.

The community is located on Ontario Highway 583 and the Algoma Central Railway, in both cases between the communities of Mead to the south and Jogues to the north.
