= René Brunelle Provincial Park =

Provincial park in Ontario, Canada

- IUCN category II (national park)
- Location within Ontario
- Interactive map of René Brunelle Provincial Park
- Location: Cochrane District, Northeastern Ontario, Canada
- Nearest city: Moonbeam
- Coordinates: 49°26′53″N 82°08′51″W
- Area: 3,015 ha (11.64 sq mi)
- Established: 1957
- Visitors: 24,811 (in 2022)
- Owner: Ontario Parks
- Website: www.ontarioparks.com/park/renebrunelle

René Brunelle Provincial Park is a provincial park in both the municipality of Moonbeam and the geographic Township of Gurney in Unorganized North Cochrane District, Cochrane District, in Northeastern Ontario, Canada. Established in 1957 and named in 1981 for René Brunelle, it is operated by Ontario Parks and has camping, hiking, swimming and other facilities on or near Remi Lake.

== Geography ==
The park is on the north and east shores of Remi Lake. A second, smaller, non-contiguous portion of the park is southwest of the lake in the municipality of Moonbeam. Spruce Creek is entirely within the park, and arrives at Round Bay on the northeast shore of Remi Lake. Other named lakes wholly in the park are Crawfish Lake; Spruce Lake, the source of Spruce Creek; and West Audrey Lake. The outflow from Remi Lake, the Remi River, is at Outlet Bay also in the park.

== Transportation ==
Remi Lake was the location of a seaplane base in the early 1900s. Access to the park is by Ontario Highway 581 which connects to Ontario Highway 11.
