= Gardiner Township =

Gardiner
- Geographic Township
- Location in Ontario
- Coordinates: 50°41′35″N 81°34′53″W
- Country: Canada
- Province: Ontario
- District: Cochrane
- Part: Unorganized North
- Elevation: 55 m (180 ft)
- Time zone: UTC-5 (Eastern Time Zone)
  - Summer (DST): UTC-4 (Eastern Time Zone)
- Postal Code FSA: P0L
- Area codes: 705, 249

Gardiner Township is a geographic township in the Unorganized North Part of Cochrane District, Ontario, Canada.

The township is the location of the mouths of Pickett Creek and the Gardiner River at the Mattagami River, and the confluence of the Mattagami River and the Missinaibi River that forms the Moose River, a river that flows to James Bay.

There is also a community and unorganized place called Gardiner in geographic Blount Township in Cochrane District about 150 kilometres (90 mi) to the southeast.
