= Mead, Ontario =

Mead
- Dispersed Rural Community; Unincorporated area
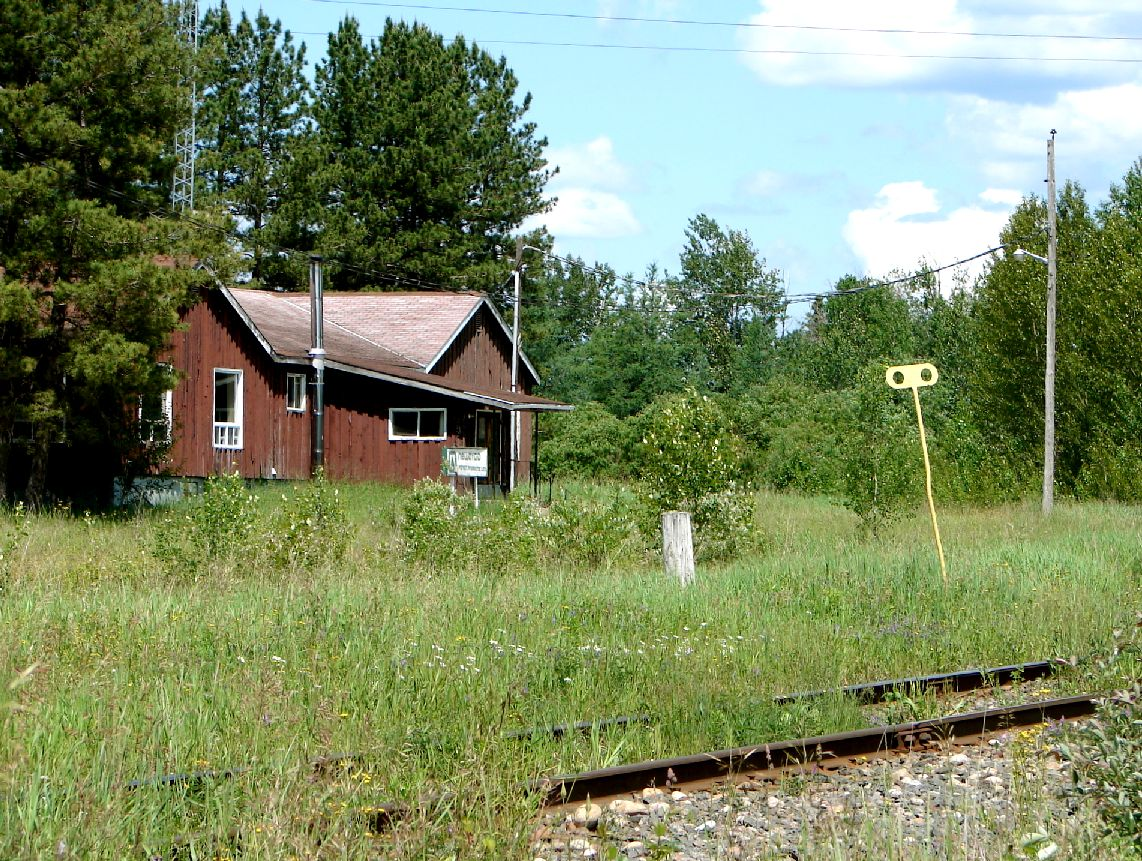

- Location in Ontario
- Coordinates: 49°27′41″N 83°52′09″W
- Country: Canada
- Province: Ontario
- District: Cochrane
- Geographic Township: Lowther
- Elevation: 293 m (961 ft)
- Time zone: UTC-5 (Eastern Time Zone)
  - Summer (DST): UTC-4 (Eastern Time Zone)
- Postal Code: P0L
- Area codes: 705, 249

Mead is a Dispersed Rural Community and unincorporated place in geographic Lowther Township, Cochrane District in Northeastern Ontario, Canada. The community is counted as part of Unorganized Cochrane North Part in Canadian census data, and is located just north of the border with Algoma District.

Mead is the southern terminus of Ontario Highway 583 about 36 kilometres (22 mi) by road south of Hearst. Mead is also on the Algoma Central Railway between the Horsey flag stop to the south and the community of Coppell to the north; the latter community is also served by Ontario Highway 583.

Along with a few isolated farms, the only other building at Mead is a former forestry company: from 1973 to 1984, American lumber company, Newaygo Timber operated a mill here.
