= Clute, Ontario =

Clute
- Dispersed Rural Community
- Location in Ontario
- Coordinates: 49°11′23″N 81°04′25″W
- Country: Canada
- Province: Ontario
- District: Cochrane
- Town: Cochrane
- Elevation: 271 m (889 ft)
- Time zone: UTC-5 (Eastern Time Zone)
  - Summer (DST): UTC-4 (Eastern Time Zone)
- Postal Code: P0L 1C0
- Area codes: 705, 249

Clute is a dispersed rural community and unincorporated place in the town of Cochrane, in Cochrane District, Ontario, Canada. It is also the name of a geographic township in Cochrane District, at the northeastern corner of which the community lies. An irregularly-shaped eastern part of the geographic township lies in the town of Cochrane following an amalgamation after 1996; the rest, the majority of the township, lies in the Unorganized North Part of Cochrane District.

The community is on Ontario Highway 579. A railway station, also in the town of Cochrane but in nearby geographic Blount Township and on the Abitibi River, is served by Ontario Northland Railway Polar Bear Express passenger trains.
