= Hunta =

Unincorporated community in Ontario, Canada

Coordinates: 49.101897°N 81.272065°W

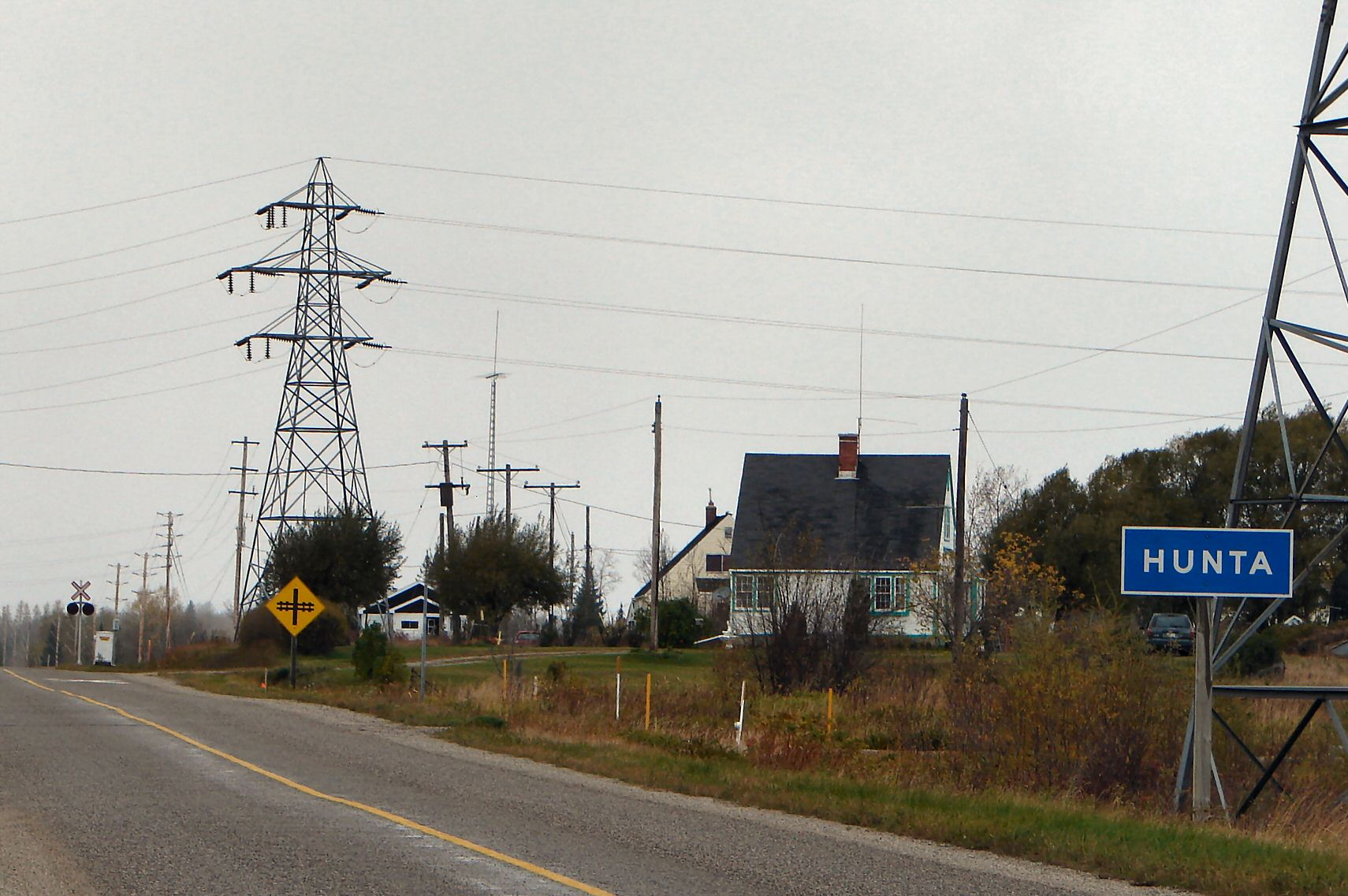
Hunta, Ontario

Hunta is an unincorporated community in the Canadian province of Ontario, located in the Cochrane District on Highway 668 west of Cochrane.

The community is counted as part of Cochrane, Unorganized, North Part in Canadian census data.

In the 1920s and 1930s Hunta was the centre for Slovak settlers who came to make a living off a part of the vast Abitibi Clay Belt. Many of the settlers ultimately left the community in the 1940s.
