= Brower, Ontario =

Community in Ontario, Canada

Coordinates: 49.058791°N 80.832362°W

Brower is an unincorporated community in the Canadian province of Ontario, located in the Cochrane District at the intersection of Highway 652 and Highway 574 east of Cochrane.

The community is counted as part of Cochrane, Unorganized, North Part in Canadian census data.
