= Eladia Smoke =

Canadian architect

- Born: Obishikokaang Lac Seul First Nation, Northern Ontario
- Education: University of Manitoba
- Occupation: Architect
- Awards: Canadian Architect Awards Celebration
- Practice: Smoke Architecture
- Projects: Mukqua Waakaa’igan Centennial College- A Block Expansion Taykwa Tagamou community centre Obisbikokaang administrative offices Red Embers Henvey 8-plex suites Naskapi of Kawawavhokimach Credit Valley Conservation Indigenous Gathering Space Mohawks of the Bay of Quinte community Wellbeing Centre Queens university indigenous gathering space Indigenous peoples space Thunder Woman Healing Lodge Henvey Inlet Community Centre Dawes Road Library
- Website: https://www.smokearchitecture.com/

Eladia Smoke is an Indigenous Canadian architect based in Hamilton, Ontario. She is Anishinaabekwe, Ojibwe from Obishikokaang, Lac Seul First Nation, with family roots in Alderville First Nation. Graduating from the University of Manitoba, Smoke has been working as an Architect since 2002. Founder and principal architect of Smoke Architecture, Eladia Smoke's work consists of light-filled public buildings that connect with the natural environment and brings light to indigenous voices. Smoke is best known for her designs of the award-winning Mukqua Waakaa’igan Indigenous Centre of Cultural Excellence in Sault Ste. Marie, ON, and her carbon free design of Centennial College’s A-block expansion in Scarborough, ON.

== Architectural style and philosophy ==
Indigenous design is linked to the environment, its inhabitants, and its culture. It is founded on the ideals that all First Nations, Inuit, and Métis peoples in Canada share, such as inclusivity, authenticity, respect, representation, and cooperation. They build to have meaning while using sustainable and relevant materials to allow the building to perform to its highest potential. The philosophy states the future of design is in the hands of Generation Z. More people need to appreciate the importance of architecture to the success of the globe, particularly considering climate change. A good relationship between a design and its surroundings, including “the land and the water,” is essential. Designing structures that are aesthetically pleasing yet harmful to the environment is the motive of Indigenous design. Eladia Smoke had expressed that all our cultures have a history of teachings centered on the land. Those precepts have been sublimated in various societies. Without losing sight of the helpful patterns that technology provides us, Two-Eyed Seeing recalls that delightful place, it is nature’s land before it is “ours”. Their people and their community, yet so giving to share with another community.

== Career ==
At a young age Eladia believed she was meant to work in the fields of medicine or law enforcement as she is White Wolf Clan, a subset of Bear Clan which is about healing and protection. Influenced by her father, Dale, a northern builder, she eventually chose the field of architecture and has seen been working as an Architect since 2002. Her career includes being principal architect at Architecture 49 in Thunder Bay, ON and architect with Prairie Architects in Winnipeg, MB. She was a master lecturer at Laurentian’s McEwen School of Architecture in Sudbury. Smoke is a member of the RAIC Architecture Canada Indigenous Task Force and was a council member of the Manitoba Association of Architects from 2011 to 2014. She then founded her firm Smoke Architecture as principal architect in 2014. Smoke Architecture is one of the few indigenous owned firms in Ontario and is an all-female, award-winning company based in Hamilton.

=== Mukwa Waakaa’igan ===
The Mi’kmaq’s concept of viewing the world through both Indigenous and Western lenses is known as “Two-Eyed Seeing.” The phenomenon was implemented when Centennial College requested designs for the A-Block expansion project that DIALOG and Smoke Architecture were a part of. Two-Eyed Seeing creates a path of potential solutions to climate change and inequity for architects.

The Mukwa Waakaa'igan Indigenous Centre of Cultural Excellence, a new hub for Algoma University in Sault Ste. Marie, Ontario, aims to create a secure environment that welcomes guests from all over the world to engage with and learn from Indigenous traditions. Indigenous learnings have been considered throughout the architectural design process, from the building form to the use of materials. The idea depicts a sloping arrangement that is reminiscent of Mukwa, the bear-like healer and protector, rising from the earth and moving toward the North from the source of life, the water, towards the direction of the Spirits. The architectural design of the new Cultural Centre is inspired by the landscape; it rises above the residential school along three paths that stand for the past, present, and future. Visitors may view the site's history from a stronger, more powerful, and dignified vantage point because of its elevated location. Mukwa Waakaa’igan Indigenous Centre of Cultural Excellence will be a facility of healing, cultural preservation, dialogue, and transformation.

=== Centennial College, A-Block Expansion ===
Centennial College located in Scarborough, Ontario added a 150,000 square foot extension to their existing A-block campus building. Over 133,000 square feet of that space is new construction, and the other 16,000 is the renovation of the existing facility. This six storey and $105 million addition included new labs for the School of Engineering Technology and Applied Science program, flexible classrooms, collaborative spaces, administrative offices, food services as well as student support areas. Smoke Architecture worked in collaboration with the Toronto design practice, DIALOG, and the construction company, EllisDon. Work commenced in June 2020 and is scheduled to be completed in the beginning months of 2023. The project’s concept and form were designed using the Mi’kmaq philosophy “two-eyed seeing” which combines indigenous values and western knowledge.

The projects programmatic elements consist of an open kitchen specifically for indigenous faculty, convergence spaces for students and visitors as well as flexible learning spaces to allow for the gatherings and teachings of Traditionalists, Elders, citizens of Indigenous Nations, and members of Indigenous communities. The building’s central avenue, known as the Wisdom Hall, is a double heighted space supported by ceiling joists representing the paddles of Ojibwe canoe. Indigenous artwork from the Haudenosaunee and Anishinaabe people line the walls of the Wisdom Hall. Aluminum panels line the building’s faced. The geometric pattern of the aluminum façade represents the scales of a fish when in motion.

This addition is one of the first zero-carbon, mass timber higher-education building in Canada. The zero-carbon design is achieved in the construction of a mass timber structure. Mass timber structures have the capability to store thousands of tonnes of carbon thereby reducing its greenhouse gas emissions. The mass timber structure is composed of cross and glue-laminated wood creating robust structural components. These structural components consist of Glulam columns, CLT floor slabs and laminated beams. The timber construction is composed of roughly 3,600 square meters of FSC-certified black spruce from northern Quebec’s boreal forest.

== Works ==
- Dawes Road Library, Toronto, Ontario
- Mukqua Waakaa’igan, Sault Ste. Marie, Ontario
- Centennial College, Scarborough, ON
- Indigenous Peoples Space, Ottawa, Ontario
- Thunder Woman Healing Lodge, Scarborough, ON
- Queens University Indigenous Gathering Space, Kingston, ON
- Henvey Inlet Community Centre, Pickerel, Ontario
- Mohawks of the Bay of Quinte Community Wellbeing Centre, Tyendinaga Mohawk Territory
- Credit Valley Conservation Indigenous Gathering Space, Orangeville, ON
- Naskapi of Kawawavhokimach, Kawawachikimach, QC
- Henvey 8-plex Suites, Pickerel, ON
- Red Embers
- Taykwa Tagamou Community Centre, Taykwa Tagamou Nation, ON
- Obishikokaang Administrative Offices, Frenchman’s Head, ON

== Awards ==
- WAFX Awards
- Canadian Architect Awards Celebration
