= Norembega =

Community in Ontario, Canada

Coordinates: 48.989455°N 80.718699°W

Norembega is an unincorporated community in the Canadian province of Ontario, located in the Cochrane District on Highway 674, 23 kilometers east of Cochrane.

The community is counted as part of Cochrane, Unorganized, North Part in Canadian census data.

Norembega has a very small population but was an active community between 1913 and 1981.

An image of the former CN rail station in the town
