= Kitigan =

- Dispersed rural community
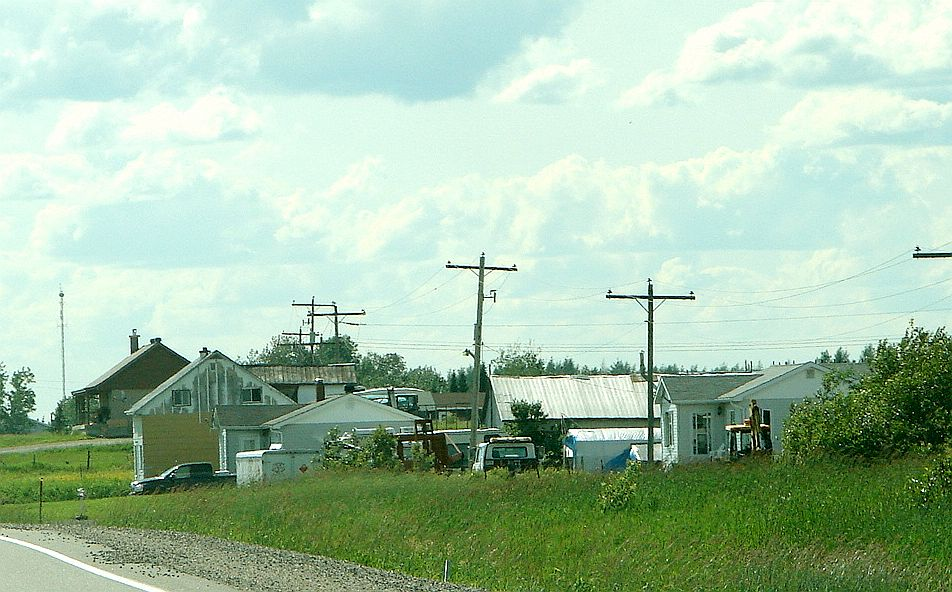

- Location in Ontario
- Coordinates: 49°23′04″N 82°17′56″W
- Country: Canada
- Province: Ontario
- District: Cochrane
- Part: Unorganized North
- Elevation: 240 m (790 ft)
- Time zone: UTC-5 (Eastern Time Zone (EST))
  - Summer (DST): UTC-4 (Eastern Time Zone (EDST))
- Postal code: P0L 1V0
- Area codes: 705, 249

Kitigan is a dispersed rural community in the Unorganized North Part of Cochrane District in Northeastern Ontario, Canada. It is located in geographic O'Brien Township along Ontario Highway 11 between the incorporated municipalities of Moonbeam to the east and Kapuskasing to the west.

The community is counted as part of Unorganized North Cochrane District in Canadian census data.
