= Kloot =

Kloot may refer to:

- I Am Kloot, band
- the ball used in the game Klootschieten

See also

- Klute (disambiguation)
