= Low Bush River =

Community in Ontario, Canada

Coordinates: 48.917°N 80.157°W

Location of Low Bush River in Ontario

Low Bush River is a community in the Canadian province of Ontario, located in the Cochrane District.

The place is counted as part of Cochrane, Unorganized, North Part in Canadian census data.
