= Smoky Falls =

Coordinates: 50°05′N 82°16′W

Location of Smoky Falls in Ontario

Smoky Falls is a community in Cochrane, Unorganized, North Part in Cochrane District, Ontario, Canada.

== Climate ==
Climate data for Smoky Falls
Month	Jan	Feb	Mar	Apr	May	Jun	Jul	Aug	Sep	Oct	Nov	Dec	Year
Record high °C (°F)	7.8 (46.0)	10.6 (51.1)	18.3 (64.9)	28.9 (84.0)	33.0 (91.4)	40.0 (104.0)	37.8 (100.0)	35.0 (95.0)	33.0 (91.4)	26.7 (80.1)	19.4 (66.9)	13.0 (55.4)	40.0 (104.0)
Mean daily maximum °C (°F)	−13.0 (8.6)	−9.4 (15.1)	−2.7 (27.1)	5.8 (42.4)	14.4 (57.9)	20.2 (68.4)	23.2 (73.8)	21.7 (71.1)	15.0 (59.0)	7.4 (45.3)	−1.3 (29.7)	−9.2 (15.4)	6.0 (42.8)
Daily mean °C (°F)	−18.7 (−1.7)	−16.0 (3.2)	−9.2 (15.4)	−0.2 (31.6)	8.2 (46.8)	14.4 (57.9)	17.6 (63.7)	16.4 (61.5)	10.7 (51.3)	4.0 (39.2)	−4.5 (23.9)	−13.8 (7.2)	0.7 (33.3)
Mean daily minimum °C (°F)	−24.5 (−12.1)	−22.4 (−8.3)	−15.8 (3.6)	−6.1 (21.0)	2.0 (35.6)	8.6 (47.5)	12.0 (53.6)	11.1 (52.0)	6.4 (43.5)	0.5 (32.9)	−7.8 (18.0)	−18.5 (−1.3)	−4.5 (23.8)
Record low °C (°F)	−47.2 (−53.0)	−44.4 (−47.9)	−41.1 (−42.0)	−32.2 (−26.0)	−15.6 (3.9)	−7.2 (19.0)	1.0 (33.8)	−2.8 (27.0)	−5.8 (21.6)	−15.6 (3.9)	−35.0 (−31.0)	−41.1 (−42.0)	−47.2 (−53.0)
Average precipitation mm (inches)	58.0 (2.28)	37.6 (1.48)	43.1 (1.70)	55.3 (2.18)	59.2 (2.33)	75.0 (2.95)	104.7 (4.12)	78.7 (3.10)	111.7 (4.40)	77.2 (3.04)	77.2 (3.04)	72.5 (2.85)	850.3 (33.48)
Average rainfall mm (inches)	0.0 (0.0)	2.6 (0.10)	9.2 (0.36)	31.4 (1.24)	55.9 (2.20)	74.9 (2.95)	104.7 (4.12)	78.7 (3.10)	111.2 (4.38)	63.3 (2.49)	23.6 (0.93)	7.2 (0.28)	562.7 (22.15)
Average snowfall cm (inches)	58.0 (22.8)	35.1 (13.8)	33.9 (13.3)	23.9 (9.4)	3.4 (1.3)	0.1 (0.0)	0.0 (0.0)	0.0 (0.0)	0.5 (0.2)	13.9 (5.5)	56.6 (22.3)	65.2 (25.7)	287.6 (113.2)
Source: Environment Canada
