= Gardiner River =

- Location of the mouth of the Gardiner River in Ontario

Location
- Country: Canada
- Province: Ontario
- Region: Northeastern Ontario
- District: Cochrane

Physical characteristics
- Source confluence: Confluence of two unnamed streams
  - location: Lambert Township
  - coordinates: 50°29′17″N 82°06′28″W
  - elevation: 84 m (276 ft)
- Mouth: Mattagami River
  - location: Gardiner Township
  - coordinates: 50°41′52″N 81°31′48″W
  - elevation: 33 m (108 ft)

Basin features
- River system: James Bay drainage basin

The Gardiner River is a river in Cochrane District in northeastern Ontario, Canada. It is in the James Bay drainage basin, and is a left tributary of the Mattagami River. The river lies between the Mattagami and the Missinaibi River just upstream of the confluence of those two to form the Moose River, which flows to James Bay.

The river begins at the confluence of two unnamed streams in geographic Lambert Township and flows northeast through unplatted Cochrane District, then geographic Gentles Township to reach geographic McCuaig Township. It turns east, flows through geographic Mulholland Township, then into geographic Gardiner Township and reaches its mouth at the Mattagami River.
