= Remi River =

- Location of the mouth of the river in Ontario

Location
- Country: Canada
- Province: Ontario
- Region: Northeastern Ontario
- District: Cochrane
- Part: Unorganized North Part

Physical characteristics
- Source: Remi Lake
  - coordinates: 49°27′43″N 82°12′04″W
  - elevation: 226 m (741 ft)
- Mouth: Kapuskasing River
  - coordinates: 49°42′31″N 82°10′45″W
  - elevation: 201 m (659 ft)

Basin features
- River system: James Bay drainage basin

The Remi River is a river in the Unorganized North Part of Cochrane District in Northeastern Ontario, Canada. It is in the James Bay drainage basin and is a right tributary of the Kapuskasing River.

== Course ==
The river begins at Outlet Bay on the northwest side of Remi Lake in René Brunelle Provincial Park in geographic Gurney Township and flows north, leaves the park, enters geographic Torrance Township, and reaches its mouth at the Kapuskasing River. The Kapuskasing River flows via the Mattagami River and the Moose River to James Bay.
