= Clute =

Clute may refer to:

== People ==
=== Arts and entertainment ===
- Chester Clute (1891–1956), American bit-part film actor
- John Clute (born 1940), Canadian writer and critic
- Judith Clute (born 1942), Canadian painter, graphic designer, print-maker, and illustrator
- Sidney Clute (1916–1985), American film and TV actor (Cagney & Lacey, McCloud)

=== Other ===
- Dan Clute (born 1966), politician in Iowa, United States
- George W. Clute (1842–1919), soldier in the American Civil War
- Oscar Clute (1857–1935), president of the State Agricultural College, Michigan, United States
- Willard Nelson Clute (1869–1950), U.S. botanist

== Places ==
- Clute, Ontario, Canada, a "displaced rural community"
  - Clute station, a railway station
- Clute, Texas, United States, a city

== See also ==
- Klute, 1971 film with Jane Fonda
