= Hallébourg =

Community in Ontario

- Community
- Interactive map of Hallébourg
- Coordinates: 49°40′5″N 83°30′32″W
- Country: Canada
- Province: Ontario
- District: Cochrane District
- Township: Kendall
- Time zone: UTC−5 (Eastern Time Zone)
  - Summer (DST): UTC−4 (EDT)
- Area code(s): 705, 249

Hallébourg is a community in the Canadian province of Ontario. The community is located in the unincorporated geographic township of Kendall in Cochrane District, on Highway 11 between the incorporated municipalities of Mattice-Val-Côté and Hearst.

The community is counted as part of Cochrane, Unorganized, North Part in Canadian census data.
