= Klute (disambiguation) =

Klute is a 1971 film starring Jane Fonda and Donald Sutherland.

Klute may also refer to:

- Chris Klute, American soccer player
- Klute (musician), a pseudonym for drum and bass producer Tom Withers
- Klutæ, an industrial music project formerly known as Klute
- Klute shag, a hairstyle based on that of Jane Fonda in the film Klute
- The Klute, a character played by Deep Roy in the season 2 episode "Gambit" of Blake's 7
- Klute (crater), a crater on the far side of the Moon
- Klute (nightclub), a nightclub in Durham, England, named after the film

== See also ==
- Clute (disambiguation)
