= New Post 69 =

- Indian reserve
- New Post Indian Reserve No. 69
- Location within Ontario
- Coordinates: 49°53′N 81°21′W
- Country: Canada
- Province: Ontario
- District: Cochrane
- First Nation: Taykwa Tagamou

Area
  - Land: 20.72 km^{2} (8.00 sq mi)

New Post 69 is a First Nations reserve near Fraserdale in Cochrane District, Ontario. It is one of the reserves of the Taykwa Tagamou Nation.
