= Frederick, Ontario =

Coordinates: 49°05′15″N 81°09′31″W

Frederick is an unincorporated community in the Canadian province of Ontario, located in the Cochrane District on Highway 636 west of Cochrane.

The community is counted as part of Cochrane, Unorganized, North Part in Canadian census data.
