= Bennet Lake Esker Kame Complex Conservation Reserve =

Conservation reserve in Ontario, Canada

Coordinates: 49.8492°N 82.3424°W

The Bennet Lake Esker Kame Complex Conservation Reserve is a Canadian conservation reserve in the townships of Boyle and Guilfoyle, in Cochrane District, Ontario. The 3,481 hectare reserve is approximately 40 km northeast of Kapuskasing.

It was proposed as a reserve on April 14, 2004, in a filing to the Ontario Ministry of Natural Resources, and designated a conservation reserve by Schedule 251 of Ontario regulation O. Reg. 315/07 on May 9, 2005.
