= Unorganized South West Cochrane District =

- Unorganized area
- Cochrane, Unorganized, South West Part
- Location within Ontario
- Coordinates: 48°22′N 80°36′W
- Country: Canada
- Province: Ontario
- District: Cochrane

Government
  - Fed. riding: Kapuskasing—Timmins—Mushkegowuk
  - Prov. riding: Timiskaming—Cochrane

Area
  - Land: 552.18 km^{2} (213.20 sq mi)

Population (2021)
  - Total: 5
  - Density: 0/km^{2} (0/sq mi)
- Time zone: UTC-5 (EST)
  - Summer (DST): UTC-4 (EDT)
- Area code(s): 705

Unorganized South West Cochrane District is an unorganized area in the Canadian province of Ontario, encompassing the small portion of the Cochrane District, between Black River-Matheson and Timmins, which is not part of either municipality.

The division had a population of 5 in the 2021 Canadian census, and a land area of 552.18 square kilometres.

== Demographics ==
Historical census populations – Cochrane, Unorganized, South West Part

Year	Pop.	±%
1976	0	—
1981	0	0.00%
1986	0	0.00%
1991	0	0.00%
1996	2	—

Year	Pop.	±%
2001	0	−100.0%
2006	0	0.00%
2011	0	0.00%
2016	0	0.00%
2021	5	—

Population counts are not adjusted for boundary changes.
Source: Statistics Canada

== See also ==
- List of townships in Ontario
