= New Post 69A =

- Indian reserve
- Taykwa Tagamou Nation 69A
- Location within Ontario
- Coordinates: 49°00′N 80°50′W
- Country: Canada
- Province: Ontario
- District: Cochrane
- First Nation: Taykwa Tagamou

Area
  - Land: 1.22 km^{2} (0.47 sq mi)

Population (2011)
  - Total: 77
  - Density: 62.9/km^{2} (163/sq mi)
- Website: taykwatagamounation.com

New Post 69A is a First Nations reserve in Cochrane District, Ontario. It is one of two reserves for the Taykwa Tagamou Nation.
