= Ontario Highway 610 =

Former Ontario provincial highway

Highway 610
- Frederick House Lake Road

Route information
- Maintained by the Ministry of Transportation of Ontario
- Length: 18.3 km (11.4 mi)
- Existed: 1956–April 1, 1997

Major junctions
- West end: Highway 101 (Hoyle, Ontario)
- East end: Highway 67 (Barbers Bay, Ontario)

Location
- Country: Canada
- Province: Ontario

Highway system
- Ontario provincial highways; Current; Former; 400-series
← Highway 609	→ Highway 611

Secondary Highway 610, commonly referred to as Highway 610, was a provincially maintained secondary highway in the Canadian province of Ontario that connected Highway 101 at Hoyle, east of Timmins, with former Highway 67 (now Municipal Road) near Barbers Bay, passing through the village of Connaught en route. Highway 610 was assumed by the Department of Highways, predecessor to the modern Ministry of Transportation of Ontario, in 1956, along with many of the secondary highways in Ontario. It remained unchanged between then and 1997, when it was decommissioned and transferred to the CIty of Timmins. The entire route is now known as Frederick House Lake Road.

== Route description ==
Highway 610 began at Highway 101 in Hoyle, on the eastern side of Timmins, by travelling north and immediately curving northeast to cross the North Porcupine River. It travelled straight through thick forests, parallel to and northwest of an Ontario Northland Railway line for 4.5 kilometres (2.8 mi) before the road forked at Dugwal. Highway 610 took the eastward fork and crossed the railway line. It continued straight east for 3.4 kilometres (2.1 mi), crossing the Moose River midway before making a smooth 90 degree curve to the north around a swamp. the route travelled north to cross the railway line again before zig-zagging east, north and finally east into Connaught, where it crossed the Frederick House River. The last several kilometres of the route travelled parallel to and north of the railway line along the southern shoreline of Frederick House Lake before eventually crossing the railway and ending at Highway 67 near Barbers Bay, passing through the village of en route.

== History ==
Highway 610 was first assumed by the Department of Highways in 1956, along with several dozen other secondary highways. It was likely maintained as a development road prior to that. It remained unchanged between then and the late 1990s. Budget constraints brought on by a recession in the early 1990s resulted in the Mike Harris provincial government forming the Who Does What? committee to determine cost-cutting measures in order to balance the budget after a deficit incurred by former premier Bob Rae. It was determined that many Ontario highways no longer served long-distance traffic movement and should therefore be maintained by local or regional levels of government. The MTO consequently transferred many highways to lower levels of government in 1997 and 1998, removing a significant percentage of the provincial highway network. On April 1, 1997, the entire route was decommissioned as a provincial highway and transferred to the City of Timmins. Highway 610 is now known as Frederick House Lake Road throughout its length.

== Major intersections ==
The following table lists the major junctions along Highway 610, as noted by the Ontario Department of Highways. The entire route was located in Timmins.

km	mi	Destinations	Notes
0.0	0.0	Highway 101	
18.3	11.4	Highway 67	
1.000 mi = 1.609 km; 1.000 km = 0.621 mi
