= CINN-FM =

Radio station in Hearst, Ontario

Coordinates: 49°38′50″N 83°30′50″W

- Hearst, Ontario; Canada
- Broadcast area: Hearst
- Frequency: 91.1 MHz (FM)

Ownership
- Owner: Radio de l'Epinette Noire

History
- First air date: 1988

Technical information
- Class: B
- ERP: 5.46 kilowatts horizontal polarization only
- HAAT: 91 meters (299 ft)

Links
- Website: cinnfm.com

CINN-FM is a Canadian radio station, broadcasting at 91.1 FM in Hearst, Ontario.

Owned and operated by Radio de l'Épinette Noire cooperative, it is a non-profit community radio station for the region's franco-ontarian community. CINN-FM began broadcasting in 1988.

The station is a member of the Alliance des radios communautaires du Canada.
