= Gardiner, Ontario =

Gardiner
- Dispersed Rural Community
- Location in Ontario
- Coordinates: 49°18′39″N 81°01′43″W
- Country: Canada
- Province: Ontario
- District: Cochrane
- Geographic Township: Blount
- Elevation: 246 m (807 ft)
- Time zone: UTC-5 (Eastern Time Zone)
  - Summer (DST): UTC-4 (Eastern Time Zone)
- Postal Code FSA: P0L
- Area codes: 705, 249

Gardiner is a Dispersed Rural Community and unincorporated place in geographic Blount Township, Cochrane District, Ontario, Canada. It is approximately 30 kilometres (19 mi) north of the town of Cochrane, and is the northern terminus of Ontario Highway 579. The community is also astride the Ontario Northland Railway line from Cochrane to Moosonee, but is not served by Polar Bear Express passenger trains.

There is also a geographic Gardiner Township in Cochrane District about 150 kilometres (90 mi) northwest of the community.
