= Tunis, Ontario =

Coordinates: 48.8379725°N 80.842788°W

Location of Tunis in Ontario

Tunis is a community in the Cochrane District of Ontario. It is considered part of Cochrane, Unorganized, North Part in Canadian census data.

Tunis is located next to Ontario Highway 11.

In 1996, Atlantic Power Corporation began commercial operation of the Tunis Project, a 43 MW gas-fired enhanced combined-cycle generating facility located adjacent to the TransCanada gas mainline.
