= Taykwa Tagamou Nation =

Taykwa Tagamou Nation (Cree: ᑕᐟᑾ ᑕᑲᒪᐤ ᐃᓂᓂᐗᐠ tatkwa takamaw ininiwak), formerly known as New Post First Nation, is a Cree First Nations band government whose reserve community is located in the Cochrane District in Ontario, Canada, along the Abitibi River. As of March, 2012, they had a total registered population of 440 people, of which 123 people lived on their own reserves.

== Governance ==
The Nation is governed by a custom electoral system, in with a chief and four councillors are elected for a four-year term. The current council consists of re-elected chief Bruce Archibald, deputy chief Derek T. Archibald, and councillors William Archibald, George Ross, Melissa Archibald, and Stanley Sutherland. The youth councilor is Jamal Gagnon. Their term of office expires on or about October 12, 2025.

As a signatory to Treaty 9, the First Nation is member of Mushkegowuk Council, a non-political regional chiefs council and Nishnawbe Aski Nation, a tribal political organisation representing most of the First Nations in northern Ontario.

== Reserves ==
Taykwa Tagamou Nation have reserved for themselves two reserves:

- 2,072 hectares (5,120 acres) New Post 69 49.885344°N 81.35107°W
- 116.80 hectares (288.6 acres) New Post 69A, which serves as their main reserve 49.009276°N 80.83746°W
