= George W. Clute =

American Civil War soldier

- Born: June 11, 1842; Marathon Township, Michigan
- Died: February 13, 1919 (aged 76); Mount Morris, Michigan
- Burial place: Mount Morris Cemetery
- Military career
- Allegiance: United States of America
- Branch: United States Army
- Rank: Corporal
- Unit: 14th Michigan Infantry Regiment - Company I
- Awards: Medal of Honor

Corporal George Washington Clute (June 11, 1842 – February 13, 1919) was an American soldier who fought in the American Civil War. Clute received the country's highest award for bravery during combat, the Medal of Honor, for his action during the Battle of Bentonville in North Carolina on 19 March 1865. He was honored with the award on 26 August 1898.

== Biography ==
Clute was born in Marathon Township, Michigan on 11 June 1842. He enlisted into the 14th Michigan Infantry Regiment. He died on 13 February 1919, and his remains are interred at the Mount Morris Cemetery in Mount Morris, Michigan.

== Medal of Honor citation ==
In a charge, captured the flag of the 40th North Carolina (Confederate States of America), the flag being taken in a personal encounter with an officer who carried and defended it.

== See also ==
- List of American Civil War Medal of Honor recipients: A–F
