= Jogues, Ontario =

Jogues
- dispersed rural community unincorporated area
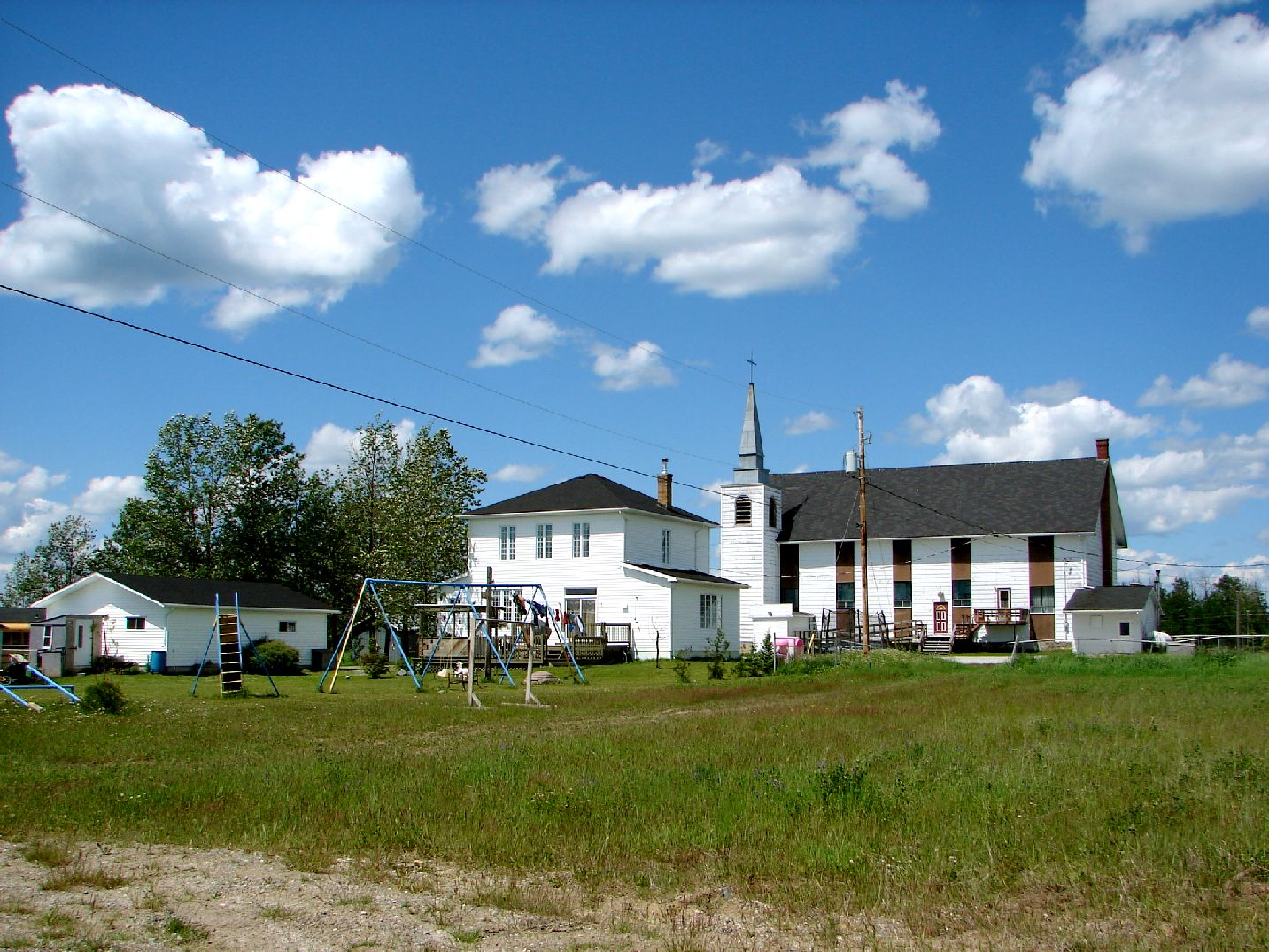

- Location in Ontario
- Coordinates: 49°35′51″N 83°44′44″W
- Country: Canada
- Province: Ontario
- District: Cochrane
- Geographic Township: Way

Area
  - Total: 79.37 km^{2} (30.64 sq mi)
- Elevation: 256 m (840 ft)

Population (2011)
  - Total: 325
  - Density: 4.09/km^{2} (10.6/sq mi)
- Time zone: UTC-5 (Eastern Time Zone)
  - Summer (DST): UTC-4 (Eastern Time Zone)
- Postal Code: P0L
- Area codes: 705, 249

Jogues is a dispersed rural community and unincorporated place in geographic Way Township, Cochrane District in Northeastern Ontario, Canada. It is about 11 kilometres (6.8 mi) southwest of Hearst (about 10–15 minutes by vehicle). Jogues is also a designated place served by a local services board.

The community is located on Ontario Highway 583 and the Algoma Central Railway; the railway location is also known as Stavert. In the case of the railway, Jogues lies between the communities of Coppell to the south and Wyborn (today part of and on the west side of Hearst) to the north; and in the case of the highway, between Coppell to the south and central Hearst to the north.

The community is mainly French-speaking, has a church, and children are bussed to Hearst for school. The community is also named after St. Issac Jogues

== Demographics ==
In the 2021 Census of Population conducted by Statistics Canada, Jogues had a population of 214 living in 90 of its 99 total private dwellings, a change of −31.4% from its 2016 population of 312. With a land area of 79.15 km^{2} (30.56 sq mi), it had a population density of 2.7/km^{2} (7.0/sq mi) in 2021.

Canada census – Jogues, Ontario community profile

	2011
Population	325 (-8.2% from 2006)
Land area	79.37 km^{2} (30.64 sq mi)
Population density	4.1/km^{2} (11/sq mi)
Median age
Private dwellings	136 (total)
Median household income

References: 2011
