= Hearst, Ontario =

Hearst
- Town (single-tier)
- Town of Hearst / Ville de Hearst (French)
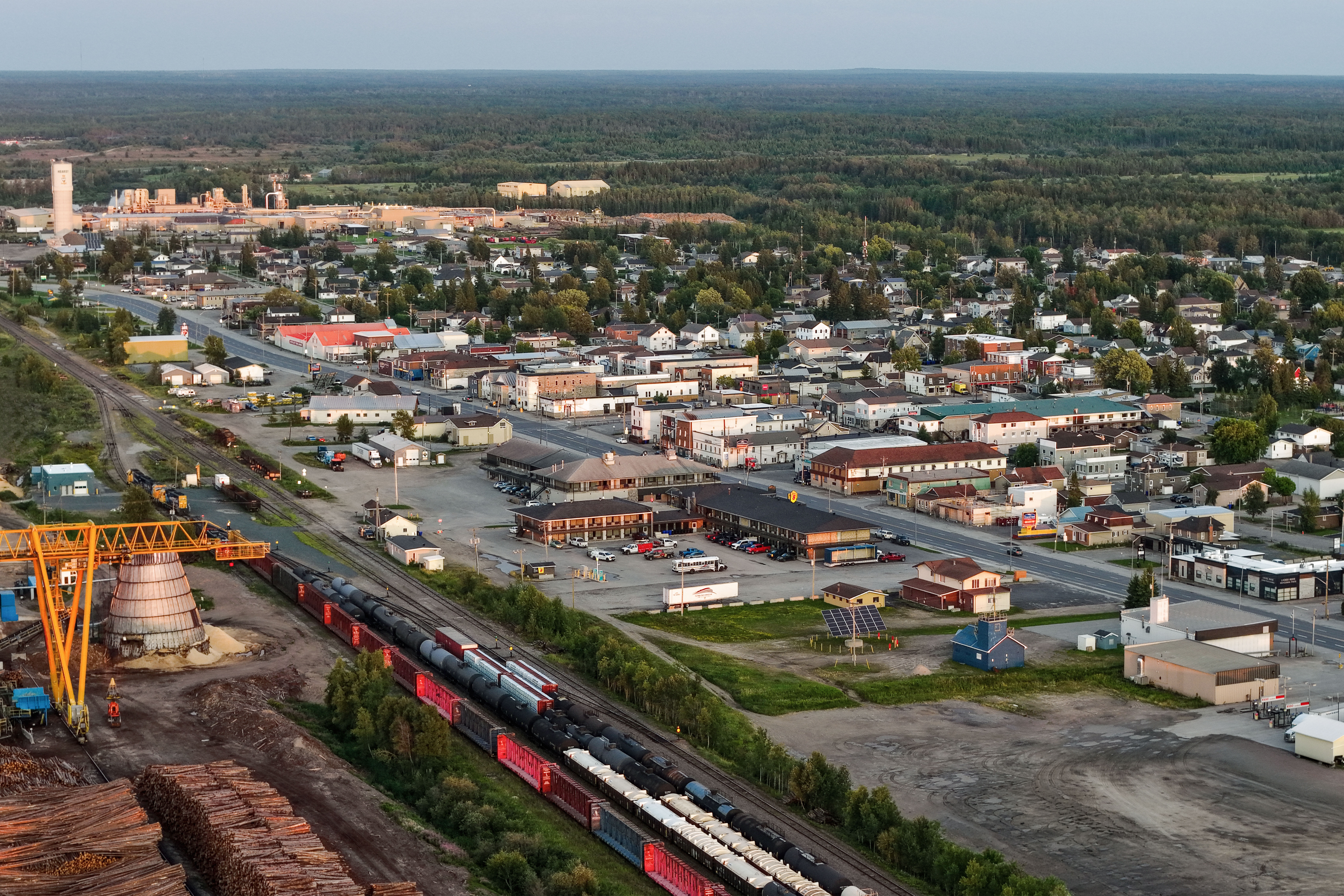
- Aerial view (2026)

- Location within Ontario
- Coordinates: 49°41′13″N 83°39′16″W
- Country: Canada
- Province: Ontario
- District: Cochrane
- Established: 1913

Government
  - Type: Town
  - Mayor: Roger Sigouin
  - Governing Body: Hearst Town Council
  - MP: Gaétan Malette (Conservative)
  - MPP: Guy Bourgouin (NDP)

Area
  - Land: 98.06 km^{2} (37.86 sq mi)

Population (2021)
  - Total: 4,794
  - Density: 48.9/km^{2} (127/sq mi)
- Time zone: UTC-5 (EST)
  - Summer (DST): UTC-4 (EDT)
- Postal code FSA: P0L
- Area code: 705
- GNBC Code: FBMTW
- Website: www.hearst.ca

Hearst is a town in Cochrane District, Ontario, Canada. It is located on the Mattawishkwia River in Northern Ontario, approximately 92 kilometres (57 mi) west of Kapuskasing, approximately 520 kilometres (320 mi) east of Thunder Bay along Highway 11. At Hearst, Highway 583 extends northward to Lac-Sainte-Thérèse and southward to Jogues, Coppell and Mead.

Hearst is well-known for its prevalent French-Canadian culture. Over 84% of the town's residents speak French as their mother language, the highest proportion in Ontario, and the dialect of French in Hearst is particularly known for being nearly indistinguishable from the French spoken in Quebec.

== History ==
The town was established as a divisional point of the National Transcontinental Railway in 1913, 208 kilometres (129 mi) west of Cochrane and 201 kilometres (125 mi) east of the divisional point of Grant. There is some indeterminacy with the name Grant as the original site of Hearst was also called Grant and was changed to Hearst in 1911.

Hearst was named to honour William Howard Hearst, then Ontario Minister of Forests and Mines and later Premier of Ontario. It was incorporated in 1922. Many settlers to the town originally came from the province of Quebec. Many also came from Europe and other regions in Canada and the USA.

== Geography ==
Hearst is located in the Cochrane District of Northern Ontario, situated along the Mattawishkwia River. The town sits at the western edge of the Great Clay Belt, a vast region of fertile land and boreal forest. It is approximately 260 km (160 mi) northwest of Timmins and is a major stop along Highway 11.

=== Climate ===
Hearst experiences a subarctic climate (Dfc) characterized by long, frigid winters and short, warm summers. The area is known for heavy snowfall, averaging over 300 centimetres (118 in) annually.

Climate data for Hearst (Averages 1991–2020, Records 1900–present)
Month	Jan	Feb	Mar	Apr	May	Jun	Jul	Aug	Sep	Oct	Nov	Dec	Year
Record high °C (°F)	10.6 (51.1)	16.6 (61.9)	21.1 (70.0)	30.5 (86.9)	35.0 (95.0)	35.6 (96.1)	37.2 (99.0)	35.6 (96.1)	34.5 (94.1)	28.3 (82.9)	19.4 (66.9)	13.9 (57.0)	37.2 (99.0)
Mean daily maximum °C (°F)	−12.3 (9.9)	−9.0 (15.8)	−1.5 (29.3)	7.3 (45.1)	15.3 (59.5)	21.1 (70.0)	23.6 (74.5)	22.3 (72.1)	16.5 (61.7)	8.3 (46.9)	−0.6 (30.9)	−8.8 (16.2)	6.9 (44.3)
Mean daily minimum °C (°F)	−24.4 (−11.9)	−22.3 (−8.1)	−15.4 (4.3)	−5.7 (21.7)	1.4 (34.5)	7.3 (45.1)	10.3 (50.5)	9.2 (48.6)	4.9 (40.8)	−1.2 (29.8)	−9.5 (14.9)	−19.6 (−3.3)	−5.4 (22.2)
Record low °C (°F)	−47.2 (−53.0)	−45.6 (−50.1)	−42.2 (−44.0)	−32.8 (−27.0)	−15.0 (5.0)	−4.4 (24.1)	−1.7 (28.9)	−3.3 (26.1)	−10.6 (12.9)	−21.1 (−6.0)	−37.2 (−35.0)	−46.7 (−52.1)	−47.2 (−53.0)
Average precipitation mm (inches)	43.1 (1.70)	31.5 (1.24)	40.5 (1.59)	51.6 (2.03)	70.2 (2.76)	86.6 (3.41)	98.7 (3.89)	84.8 (3.34)	91.2 (3.59)	81.3 (3.20)	63.8 (2.51)	54.0 (2.13)	797.3 (31.39)
Average snowfall cm (inches)	42.6 (16.8)	30.2 (11.9)	33.7 (13.3)	24.3 (9.6)	5.2 (2.0)	0.2 (0.1)	0.0 (0.0)	0.0 (0.0)	0.8 (0.3)	14.8 (5.8)	50.1 (19.7)	51.5 (20.3)	253.4 (99.8)
Source: Environment and Climate Change Canada

== Demographics ==
In the 2021 Census of Population conducted by Statistics Canada, Hearst had a population of 4,794 living in 2,254 of its 2,373 total private dwellings, a change of −5.4% from its 2016 population of 5,070. With a land area of 98.06 km^{2} (37.86 sq mi), it had a population density of 48.9/km^{2} (126.6/sq mi) in 2021.

Canada census – Hearst community profile

	2021	2016	2011
Population	4,794 (-5.4% from 2016)	5,070 (-0.4% from 2011)	5,090 (-9.4% from 2006)
Land area	98.06 km^{2} (37.86 sq mi)	98.52 km^{2} (38.04 sq mi)	98.73 km^{2} (38.12 sq mi)
Population density	48.9/km^{2} (127/sq mi)	51.5/km^{2} (133/sq mi)	51.6/km^{2} (134/sq mi)
Median age	48.0 (M: 48.4, F: 47.2)	47.9 (M: 47.4, F: 48.3)	45.1 (M: 44.8, F: 45.5)
Private dwellings	2,373 (total) 2,254 (occupied)	2,466 (total)	2,401 (total)
Median household income	$76,500	$64,064

References: 2021 2016 2011

Historical census populations - Hearst

Year	Pop.	±%
1931	751	—
1941	995	+32.5%
1951	1,723	+73.2%
1956	2,214	+28.5%
1961	2,373	+7.2%
1966	2,882	+21.4%

Year	Pop.	±%
1971	3,501	+21.5%
1976	5,195	+48.4%
1981	5,533	+6.5%
1986	5,559	+0.5%
1991	6,079	+9.4%
1996	6,049	−0.5%

Year	Pop.	±%
2001	5,825	−3.7%
2006	5,620	−3.5%
2011	5,090	−9.4%
2016	5,070	−0.4%
2021	4,794	−5.4%

Population counts are not adjusted for boundary changes.
Source: Statistics Canada

== Economy ==
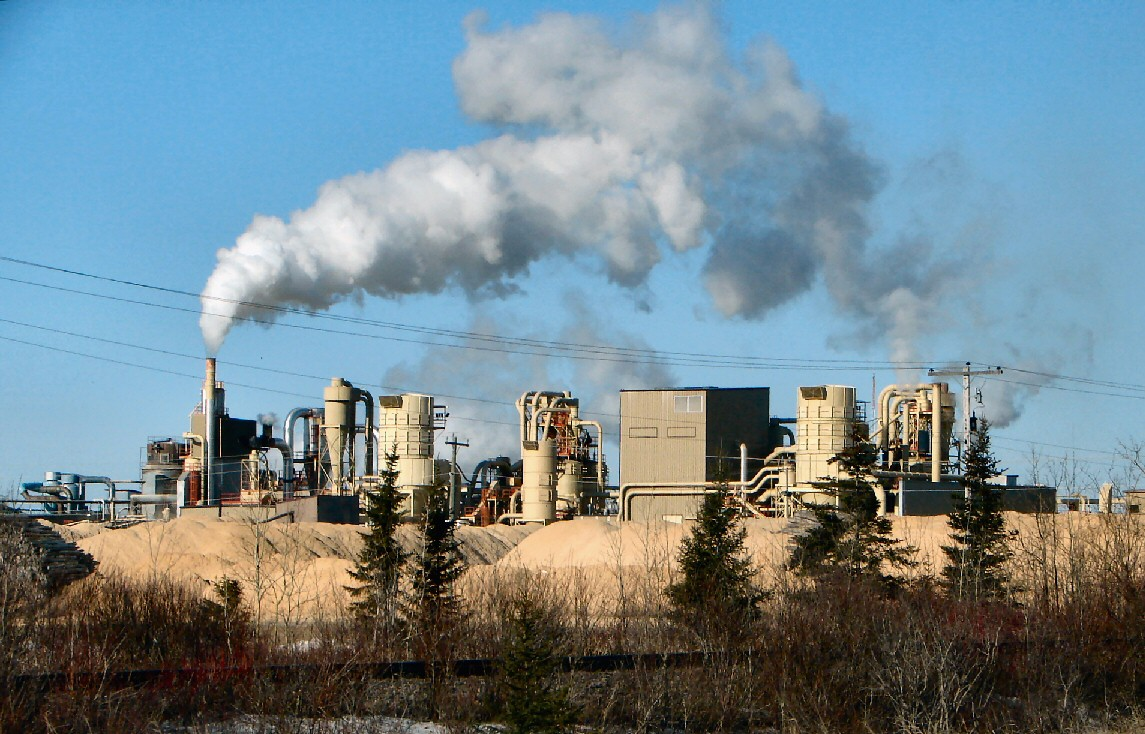
Mill in Hearst

Hearst has a long tradition of being a "lumber town". Currently the major employers include a Greenfirst hardwood and softwood facility as well as a plywood mill operated by Columbia Forest Products.

== Arts and culture ==
93.7% of Hearst's population is francophone. Different cultures can be found in Hearst such as Finn, Slovak, Bulgarian, Chinese, Portuguese, Greek, Ukrainian, First Nations and also Black Canadians.

The town is home to the Université de Hearst, formerly a federated school of Laurentian University in Sudbury. The Hearst Public Library was founded on December 17, 1974. In its beginning, the library was situated in the basement of the Hearst High School where it shared its space with the school library. On June 4, 1984, the library moved to its present location, 801 George Street (formerly Stedman's). Hearst is a four-season destination. Many years ago, the town proclaimed itself the Moose Capital of Canada. Local outdoor activities include fishing, hunting, snowmobiling, cross-country skiing, camping, swimming, canoeing, and golf.

== Infrastructure ==
=== Transportation ===
Hearst is served by Hearst (René Fontaine) Municipal Airport.

The Ontario Northland Railway purchased the part of the National Transcontinental Railway serving Hearst in 1993. The Canadian National Railways (formerly Algoma Central Railway) connects with the Ontario Northland at Hearst.

Hearst was the northern terminus for a Canadian National Railways-operated passenger train service from Sault Ste. Marie, Ontario, running over the tracks of the Algoma Central Railway. Hearst is the northern terminus for Ontario Northland's coach service.

== Education ==
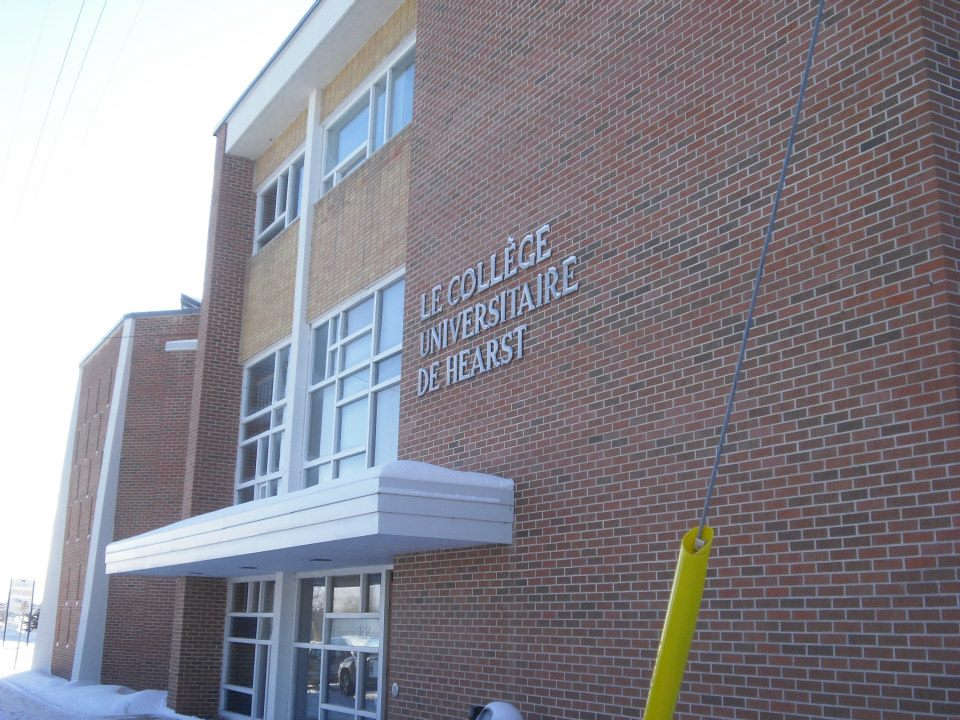
Université de Hearst, Hearst campus

Hearst has both elementary and high schools (public and Catholic). It also has the Université de Hearst, a post-secondary institution that was formerly federated with Laurentian University in Sudbury. Education can also be sought at the collegiate level with the Collège Boréal.

== Media ==
=== Radio ===
Hearst's only local radio service is provided by CINN-FM, a community radio station. All other radio stations available in the community are rebroadcasters of stations from Kapuskasing or Sudbury.

Frequency	Call sign	Branding	Format	Owner	Notes
FM 90.3	CBON-FM-26	Ici Radio-Canada Première	Talk radio, public radio	Canadian Broadcasting Corporation	Rebroadcaster of CBON-FM (Sudbury)
FM 91.1	CINN-FM	CINNFM 91.1	Community radio	Radio de l'Épinette Noire	Franco-Ontarian community radio
FM 91.9	CBCC-FM	CBC Radio One	Talk radio, public radio	Canadian Broadcasting Corporation	Rebroadcaster of CBCS-FM (Sudbury)
FM 94.5	CKHT-FM	Moose FM	Adult contemporary	Vista Broadcast Group	Rebroadcaster of CKAP-FM (Kapuskasing)
FM 95.5	VF2597		tourist information	1158556 Ontario Ltd. (Roger de Brabant)	VF2597 Hearst, ON - FCCdata.org

=== Television ===
OTA channel	Call sign	Network	Notes
4 (VHF)	CITO-TV-3	CTV	Rebroadcaster of CITO-TV (Timmins); de fact rebroadcaster of CICI-TV (Sudbury)

== Notable people ==
- Réginald Bélair, politician
- René Fontaine, politician. Hearst (René Fontaine) Municipal Airport is named in his honour.
- Doric Germain, writer whose books centre on Franco-Ontarian heritage
- Claude Giroux, professional hockey player
- Claude Larose, professional hockey player
- Rumun Ndur, professional hockey player
- Eric Sorensen, journalist
- Pierre LeBrun, journalist

== See also ==
- List of francophone communities in Ontario
- Franco-Ontarians
