= Moonbeam, Ontario =

Moonbeam
- Township (single-tier)
- Township of Moonbeam; Canton de Moonbeam
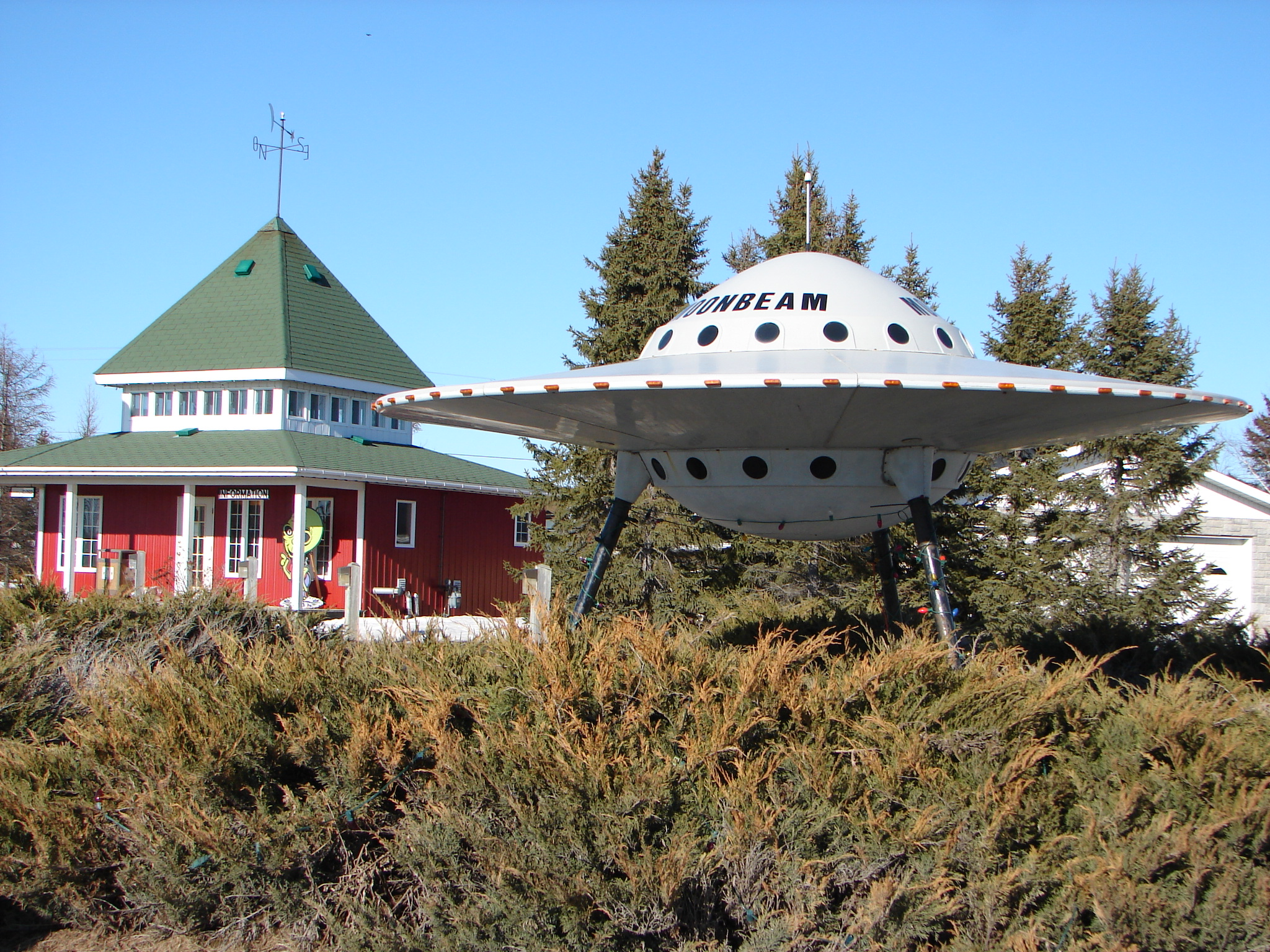
- Novelty UFO and visitor centre in Moonbeam

- Location within Ontario
- Coordinates: 49°21′N 82°09′W
- Country: Canada
- Province: Ontario
- District: Cochrane
- Settled: 1912
- Incorporated: 1922

Government
  - Type: Township
  - Mayor: Luc Léonard
  - Fed. riding: Kapuskasing—Timmins—Mushkegowuk
  - Prov. riding: Mushkegowuk—James Bay

Area
  - Land: 234.46 km^{2} (90.53 sq mi)

Population (2021)
  - Total: 1,157
  - Density: 4.9/km^{2} (13/sq mi)
- Time zone: UTC-5 (EST)
  - Summer (DST): UTC-4 (EDT)
- Postal Code: P0L 1V0
- Area code(s): 705
- Website: www.moonbeam.ca

Moonbeam is a township in Ontario, Canada, located in the Cochrane District. It is located between the communities of Fauquier and Kitigan, 20 kilometres (12 mi) east of Kapuskasing along Highway 11 just south of René Brunelle Provincial Park. It is known for its roadside flying saucer, which is also featured prominently in promotional material. The town is most famously referenced in the song "Fly" by the Canadian rock band The Tragically Hip, on their 2006 album World Container.

The township was originally incorporated as the Township of Fauquier (after the coterminous geographic township), but changed its name to its main population centre in 1982.

== Origin of the name Moonbeam ==
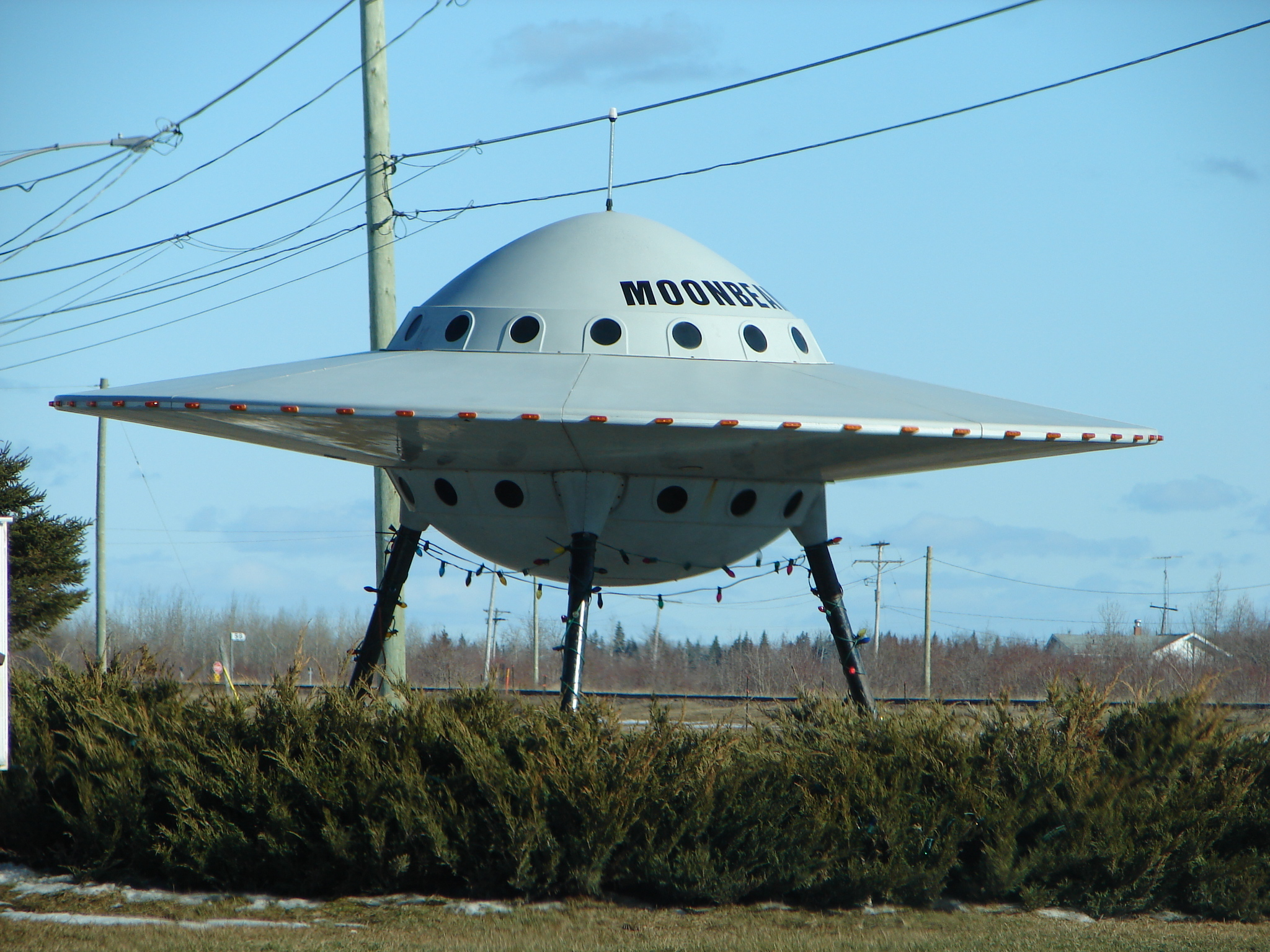
Flying Saucer of Moonbeam

The name "Moonbeam" is attributed to early pioneers who allegedly witnessed flashing lights falling from the sky, which they called "moonbeams". These lights fell down or reflected in a creek that flows west from Strickland to Remi Lake and was called Moonbeam Creek. These lights could have been Northern Lights that often appear with the moon light.

Another suggestion is that the name came from the passengers on the Transcontinental Railway, who would be traveling for many miles through dark forests and when they came to the natural clearing near Moonbeam would be struck by the brilliance of the moon-lit snow. Nevertheless, there is no documented proof of the exact source of this name.

Rémi Lake was named after a Great Trunk Pacific Railway worker who drowned there in 1905.

== History ==
The National Transcontinental Railway, connecting Quebec City with the Canadian Prairies, was completed by 1912 and provided new access to agricultural land and natural resources of northern Ontario. This attracted colonizers from Montreal, Sainte-Agathe-des-Monts, and Saint-Jovite, to the Moonbeam area, looking for land to cultivate or mine.

Timeline:

- The first family to get established in Moonbeam was Théodule and Valentine Léonard in 1909.
- The first baby born in Moonbeam was Marie Régina Lecuyer in 1914.
- The priest, founder of Moonbeam, was Ovila François Paquette O.M.I. in 1916.
- The first school to open its doors was in September 1919.
- The first church to be built in Moonbeam was in 1919-1920, called Nativité de Moonbeam.
- The first cottage to be built on the Rémi Lake is the cottage of a rich tourist from Rochester New-York, Mr. Buelle in 1920.
- The first Reeve of Moonbeam was Joseph Girouard in 1922.
- The first St-Jean Parade was in 1922.
- The incorporation of the District of Fauquier was January 9, 1922.
- The first doctor in the region was Doctor Nicole in Fauquier in 1924.
- The first airplane in Moonbeam was a Curtiss HS-2L flown by Captain C.A. Schiller in 1925.
- The first butter-production firm was open in 1927. It cost $3689.00 to build and $5954.00 for all the machinery.
- The first doctor to open its doors in Moonbeam was Doctor Guillaume Soucie in 1934.
- 1930–1940, the speed limit was raised to 15 miles per hour (24 km/h).
- 1930–1940, all stores were restricted to not sell tobacco to kids less than 18 years of age.
- The chapel at Rémi Lake celebrated its first mass in 1960.
- The sewage system in the village was installed November 1, 1965.
- In 1963, the township was enlarged when it annexed part of unorganized area.

== Demographics ==
In the 2021 Census of Population conducted by Statistics Canada, Moonbeam had a population of 1,157 living in 524 of its 759 total private dwellings, a change of −6% from its 2016 population of 1,231. With a land area of 234.46 km^{2} (90.53 sq mi), it had a population density of 4.9/km^{2} (12.8/sq mi) in 2021.

Canada census – Moonbeam community profile

	2021	2016	2011
Population	1,157 (-6.0% from 2016)	1231 (11.8% from 2011)	1101 (-15.2% from 2006)
Land area	234.46 km^{2} (90.53 sq mi)	235.58 km^{2} (90.96 sq mi)	235.65 km^{2} (90.98 sq mi)
Population density	4.9/km^{2} (13/sq mi)	5.2/km^{2} (13/sq mi)	4.7/km^{2} (12/sq mi)
Median age	55.6 (M: 56.0, F: 55.2)	52.4 (M: 53.7, F: 51.6)
Private dwellings	759 (total) 524 (occupied)	545 (total)	843 (total)
Median household income	$90,000	$73,830

References: 2021 2016 2011

Historical census populations – Moonbeam, Ontario

Year	Pop.	±%
1921	693	—
1931	710	+2.5%
1941	887	+24.9%
1951	1,009	+13.8%
1956	1,048	+3.9%
1961	1,241	+18.4%

Year	Pop.	±%
1966	1,408	+13.5%
1971	1,509	+7.2%
1976	1,569	+4.0%
1981	1,509	−3.8%
1986	1,426	−5.5%
1991	1,330	−6.7%

Year	Pop.	±%
1996	1,322	−0.6%
2001	1,201	−9.2%
2006	1,298	+8.1%
2011	1,101	−15.2%
2016	1,231	+11.8%
2021	1,157	−6.0%

Population counts are not adjusted for boundary changes.
Source: Statistics Canada

Mother tongue (2021):

- English as first language: 25.1%
- French as first language: 71.0%
- English and French as first languages: 3.0%
- Other as first language: 0.9%

== List of mayors ==
Mayors from incorporation in 1922 to present:

- Joseph Girouard (1922–1923)
- Célestin Desgroseillers (1924–1928)
- Vital Filion (1929–1931)
- Cléophas Desgroseillers (1932–1935)
- Albert Gaudreault (1936–1938)
- Guillaume Soucie (1939–1942)
- Ernest Léonard (1943–1946)
- Alexandre Lacroix (1947–1950)
- Jos. Aimable Turcotte (1951 and 1955–1958)
- Francis St-Aubin (1952–1954)
- Stanislas Lavoie (1959–1972)
- Raymond Bouchard (1972–1978)
- Gaëtan Filion (1979–1985)
- Olivain Fullum (1985–1997)
- Claude D'Amours (1997–2000)
- Gilles Audet (2000–2018)
- Nicole Fortier Levesque (2018–2024)
- Luc Léonard

== See also ==
- List of townships in Ontario
- List of francophone communities in Ontario
