= Unorganized North Cochrane District =

- Unorganized area
- Cochrane, Unorganized, North Part
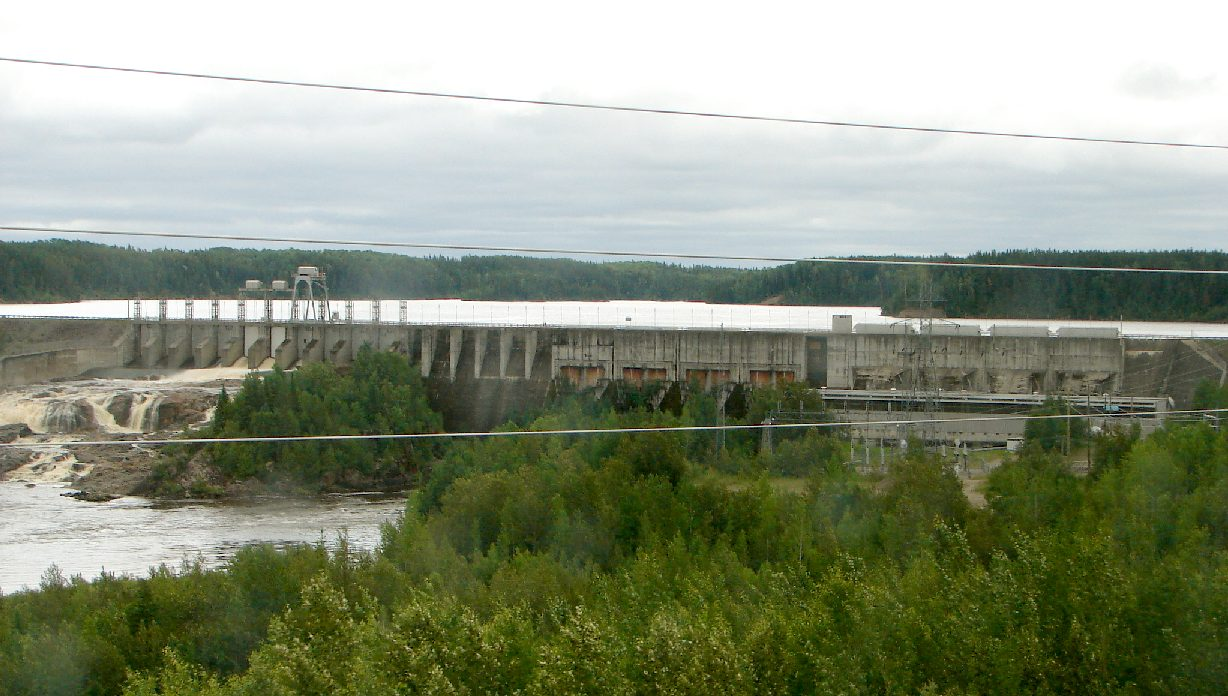
- Otter Rapids Generating Station on the Abitibi River

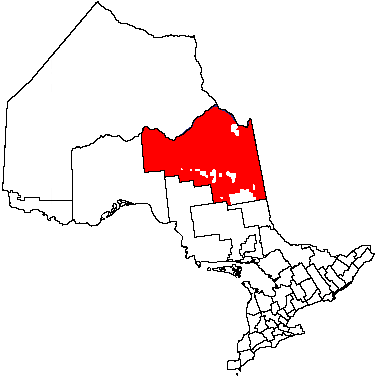
- Coordinates: 50°00′N 82°00′W
- Country: Canada
- Province: Ontario
- District: Cochrane

Government
  - Fed. ridings: Kapuskasing—Timmins—Mushkegowuk; Thunder Bay—Superior North
  - Prov. ridings: Mushkegowuk—James Bay; Timiskaming—Cochrane

Area
  - Land: 130,291.63 km^{2} (50,305.88 sq mi)

Population (2021)
  - Total: 2,546
  - Density: 0.02/km^{2} (0.052/sq mi)
- Time zone: UTC-5 (EST)
  - Summer (DST): UTC-4 (EDT)
- Area codes: 705, 249

Unorganized North Cochrane District is an unorganized area in the District of Cochrane in Northeastern Ontario, Canada. It comprises all parts of the district north of Timmins and Iroquois Falls which are not part of an incorporated municipality.

== Communities ==
The territory includes the communities of:

- Abitibi Canyon
- Brower
- Calstock
- Coppell
- Departure Lake
- Driftwood
- Eades
- Fontaine's Landing
- Fraserdale
- Frederick
- Gardiner
- Ghost River
- Hallébourg
- Hunta
- Jogues
- Kitigan
- Lac-Sainte-Thérèse
- Low Bush River
- Marina Veilleux
- Mead
- Moose Factory South
- Norembega
- Pagwa River
- Smoky Falls
- Tunis

== Demographics ==
Canada census – Cochrane, Unorganized, North Part community profile

	2021	2016	2011
Population	2,546 (-11.1% from 2016)	2,865 (-6.5% from 2011)	3064 (25.2% from 2006)
Land area	130,291.63 km^{2} (50,305.88 sq mi)	131,735.62 km^{2} (50,863.41 sq mi)	131,732.83 km^{2} (50,862.33 sq mi)
Population density	0.0/km^{2} (0/sq mi)	0.0/km^{2} (0/sq mi)	0.0/km^{2} (0/sq mi)
Median age	48.8 (M: 50.0, F: 47.2)	46.4 (M: 47.8, F: 45.0)
Private dwellings	1,494 (total) 1,035 (occupied)	1,835 (total) 1,167 (occupied)	1914 (total)
Median household income	$97,000	$80,320

Notes: Includes population and dwelling count amendments
References: 2021 2016 2011

Historical census populations – Unorganized North Cochrane District

Year	Pop.	±%
1976	7,074	—
1981	7,059	−0.2%
1986	5,165	−26.8%
1991	4,025	−22.1%
1996	4,187	+4.0%

Year	Pop.	±%
2001	3,237	−22.7%
2006	2,447	−24.4%
2011	3,064	+25.2%
2016	2,865	−6.5%
2021	2,546	−11.1%

Population figures based on revised counts. Population counts are not adjusted for boundary changes.
Source: Statistics Canada

Mother tongue (2021):

- English as first language: 44.6%
- French as first language: 48.3%
- English and French as first languages: 3.4%
- Other as first language: 2.8%

== See also ==
- List of townships in Ontario
- List of francophone communities in Ontario
