= Cochrane District =

Cochrane District District de Cochrane
- District
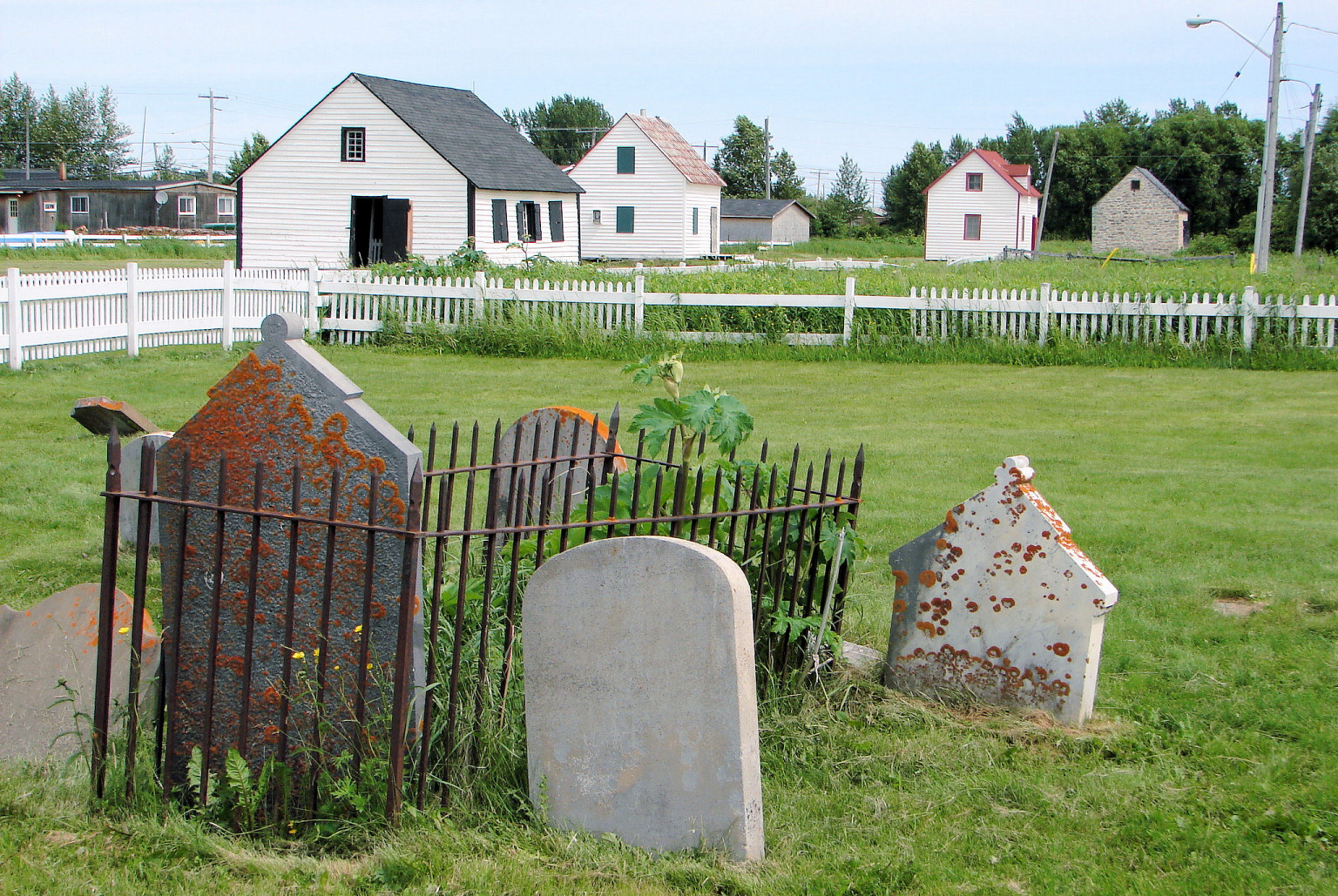
- Moose Factory

- Location of Cochrane District in Ontario in Red
- Coordinates: 50°30′N 83°00′W
- Country: Canada
- Province: Ontario
- Region: Northeastern Ontario
- Created: 1921
- Seat: Cochrane

Area
  - Land: 139,784.03 km^{2} (53,970.92 sq mi)

Population (2021)
  - Total: 77,963
  - Density: 0.6/km^{2} (1.6/sq mi)
- Time zone: UTC−05:00 (EST)
  - Summer (DST): UTC−04:00 (EDT)
- Area code: 705

Cochrane District is a district and census division in Northeastern Ontario in the Canadian province of Ontario. It was created in 1921 from parts of Algoma, Timiskaming and Thunder Bay districts.

In 2021, the district's population was 77,963, with a land area of 141,268.51 km^{2} (54,544.08 sq mi), making it slightly smaller than the US state of Michigan and the second largest district in Ontario after Kenora District. The district seat is Cochrane.

Bennet Lake Esker Kame Complex Conservation Reserve is located in Cochrane District.

== Subdivisions ==
City:

- Timmins

Towns:

- Cochrane
- Hearst
- Iroquois Falls
- Kapuskasing
- Moosonee
- Smooth Rock Falls

Townships:

- Black River-Matheson
- Fauquier-Strickland
- Mattice-Val Côté
- Moonbeam
- Opasatika
- Val Rita-Harty

Unorganized areas:

- North Part (includes the local services boards of Hallébourg, Jogues, Lac-Sainte-Thérèse, and Moose Factory)
- South East Part
- South West Part

=== First Nations ===
Cree Nation reserves:

- Abitibi Indian Reserve No. 70 (Wahgoshig First Nation)
- Constance Lake 92 (Constance Lake First Nation)
- Factory Island 1 (Moose Cree First Nation)
- Flying Post 73 (Flying Post First Nation)
- Fort Albany 67 (Fort Albany First Nation)
- Moose Factory 68 (Moose Cree First Nation)
- New Post 69 (Taykwa Tagamou Nation)
- New Post 69A (Taykwa Tagamou Nation)

== Demographics ==
As a census division in the 2021 Census of Population conducted by Statistics Canada, the Cochrane District had a population of 77,963 living in 33,772 of its 37,667 total private dwellings, a change of −2.2% from its 2016 population of 79,682. With a land area of 139,784.03 km^{2} (53,970.92 sq mi), it had a population density of 0.6/km^{2} (1.4/sq mi) in 2021.

Canada census – Cochrane District community profile

	2021	2016	2011
Population	77,963 (-2.2% from 2016)	79,682 (−1.8% from 2011)	81,122 (−1.7% from 2006)
Land area	139,784.03 km^{2} (53,970.92 sq mi)	141,268.51 km^{2} (54,544.08 sq mi)	141,270.41 km^{2} (54,544.81 sq mi)
Population density	0.6/km^{2} (1.6/sq mi)	0.6/km^{2} (1.6/sq mi)	0.6/km^{2} (1.6/sq mi)
Median age	43.6 (M: 42.8, F: 44.4)	43.3 (M: 42., F: 43.9)
Private dwellings	37,667 (total) 33,772 (occupied)	37,974 (total)	37,242 (total)
Median household income	$78,500

Notes: Excludes census data for one or more incompletely enumerated Indian reserves.
References: 2021 2016 2011

Historical census populations – Cochrane District

Year	Pop.	±%
1921	26,293	—
1931	58,033	+120.7%
1941	80,730	+39.1%
1951	83,850	+3.9%
1956	86,768	+3.5%
1961	95,666	+10.3%

Year	Pop.	±%
1966	97,334	+1.7%
1971	95,836	−1.5%
1976	96,881	+1.1%
1981	96,875	−0.0%
1986	93,712	−3.3%
1991	93,917	+0.2%

Year	Pop.	±%
1996	93,240	−0.7%
2001	85,247	−8.6%
2006	82,503	−3.2%
2011	81,122	−1.7%
2016	79,682	−1.8%
2021	77,963	−2.2%

2001 and 2006 Excludes census data for one or more incompletely enumerated Indian reserves. Population counts are not adjusted for boundary changes.
Source: Statistics Canada

== See also ==
- List of townships in Ontario
- List of secondary schools in Ontario#Cochrane District
