= Fox Lake (Cochrane District) =

- Location in Ontario
- Location: Cochrane District, Ontario
- Coordinates: 49°52′17″N 83°52′24″W
- Type: Lake
- Part of: James Bay drainage basin
- Primary outflows: Fox River
- Basin countries: Canada
- Max. length: 4.3 kilometres (2.7 mi)
- Max. width: .7 kilometres (0.4 mi)
- Surface elevation: 235 metres (771 ft)

Fox Lake is a lake in geographic Bannerman Township, Cochrane District in Northeastern Ontario, Canada. It is in the James Bay drainage basin, and is the source of the Fox River.

There are two unnamed inflows, at the southwest and northwest, and two unnamed itinerant inflows at the east. The primary outflow, at the north, is the Fox River, which flows via the Kabinakagami River, the Kenogami River and the Albany River to James Bay.

== See also ==
- List of lakes in Ontario
