= Wilgar, Ontario =

Wilgar
- Location of Wilgar in Ontario
- Coordinates: 50°01′51″N 85°25′06″W
- Country: Canada
- Province: Ontario
- Region: Northeastern Ontario
- District: Cochrane
- Part: Cochrane, Unorganized, North
- Elevation: 206 m (676 ft)
- Time zone: UTC-5 (Eastern Time Zone)
  - Summer (DST): UTC-4 (Eastern Time Zone)
- Postal code FSA: P0L
- Area codes: 705, 249

Wilgar is an unincorporated place and railway point in geographic Henderson Township in Unorganized North Cochrane District in northeastern Ontario, Canada.

It is on a now abandoned portion of the Canadian National Railway main line originally constructed as the National Transcontinental Railway transcontinental main line, between the railway points of Flintdale to the west and Pagwa to the east.

Wilgar is also on the Bicknell River, part of the James Bay drainage basin, which flows via the Pagwachuan River, Kenogami River and Albany River to James Bay.
