= Aphid (disambiguation) =

An aphid is a type of sap-feeding insect.

Aphid may also refer to:

- Molniya R-60 or Aphid, a Soviet/Russian air-to-air missile
- Lake Storm "Aphid", a 2006 snowstorm in Buffalo, New York
