= Lynx, Ontario =

Lynx
- Location of Lynx in Ontario
- Coordinates: 50°06′29″N 85°57′59″W
- Country: Canada
- Province: Ontario
- Region: Northeastern Ontario
- District: Cochrane
- Part: Cochrane, Unorganized, North
- Elevation: 275 m (902 ft)
- Time zone: UTC-5 (Eastern Time Zone)
  - Summer (DST): UTC-4 (Eastern Time Zone)
- Postal code FSA: P0L
- Area codes: 705, 249

Lynx is an unincorporated place and railway point in the Unorganized North Part of Cochrane District in northeastern Ontario, Canada.

It was a railway station at mile 110 on a now abandoned portion of the Pagwa Subdivision, Cochrane Division of the Canadian National Railway main line originally constructed as the Hearst Subdivision, District 2 of the National Transcontinental Railway transcontinental main line, between the railway points of Jobrin to the west and Ogahalla to the east.

Lynx is also on Lynx Creek, part of the James Bay drainage basin, which flows via the Atikasibi River to the Kenogami River.
