= Kabinakagami Lake =

Lake in Ontario, Canada

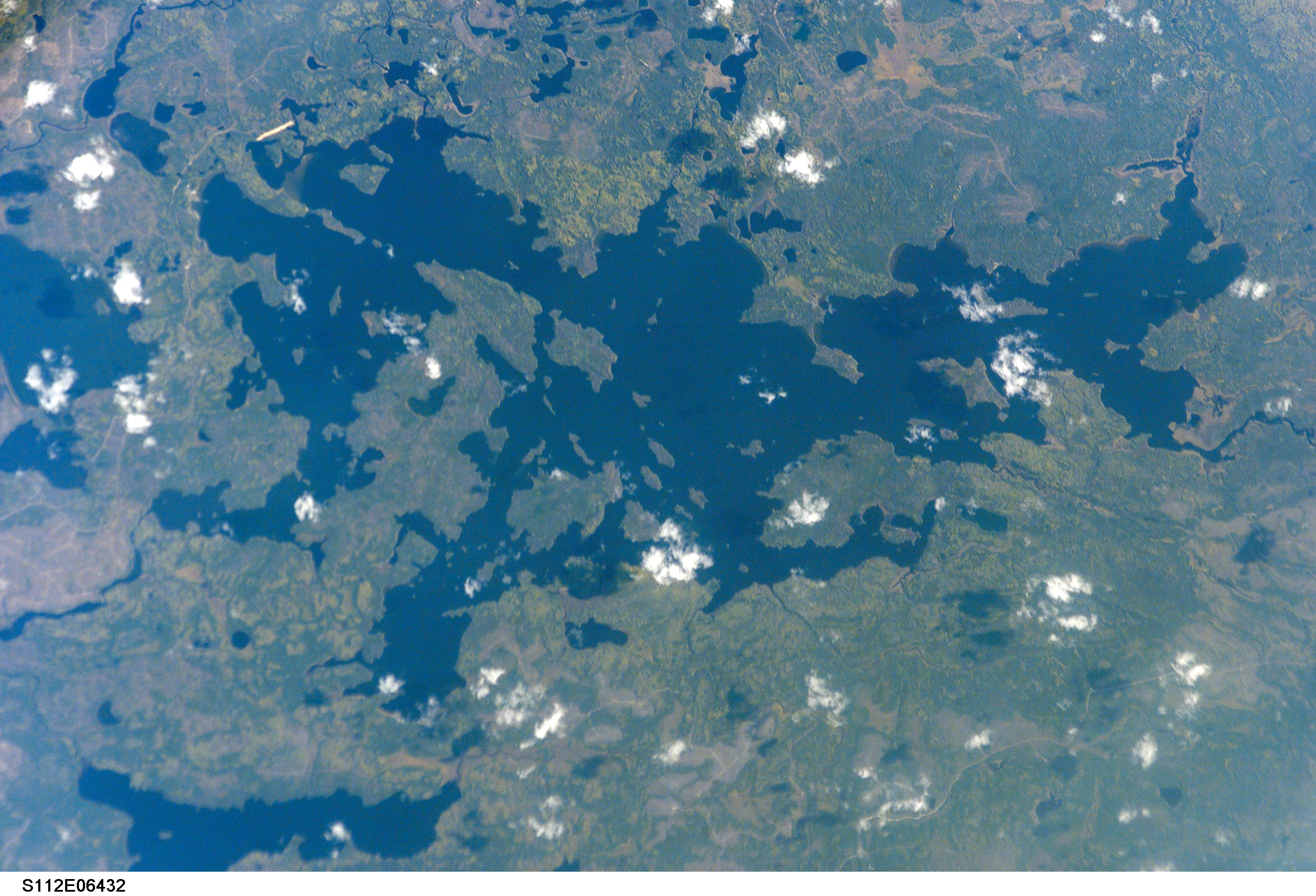
- Kabinakagami Lake from space (north is to the left)

- Location within Ontario
- Location: Algoma District, Ontario
- Coordinates: 48°54′29″N 84°24′23″W
- Primary inflows: Kabinakagami River, Oba River
- Primary outflows: Kabinakagami River
- Basin countries: Canada
- Max. length: 26 km (16 mi)
- Max. width: 12 km (7.5 mi)
- Surface area: 108 km^{2} (42 sq mi)
- Average depth: 3 m (9.8 ft)
- Max. depth: 15.2 m (50 ft)
- Water volume: 0.324 km^{3} (0.078 cu mi)
- Shore length^{1}: 202 km (126 mi)
- Surface elevation: 316 m (1,037 ft)
- Islands: Agamik Island, Birch Island, Blueberry Island, Burnt Island, Dog Island, John's Island, Moose Island, Twenty Pound Island
- ^{1} Shore length is not a well-defined measure.

Kabinakagami Lake is a lake in the Unorganized North Part of Algoma District in northeastern Ontario, Canada. The lake is on the Kabinakagami River and is part of the James Bay drainage basin. It is located northwest of the Chapleau Crown Game Preserve, and about 17 kilometres (11 mi) southwest of the settlement of Oba and 100 kilometres (62 mi) southwest of the town of Hearst.

== Hydrology ==
The primary inflows are the Kabinakagami River at Little Kaby Bay at the southwest, and the Oba River at the east of the lake. There are a number of secondary inflows. Left tributaries, clockwise from the Kabinakagami River inflow to the Kabinakagami River outflow, are Bear Creek at the southwest near Picard's Point; Stoney Creek at the top of Boot Bay at the west; and Fairy Creek at the west. Right tributaries, clockwise from the Kabinakagami River outflow to the Kabinakagami River inflow, are: Ermine Creek at Little Whitefish Bay at the east; and Noisy Creek and Five Mile Creek at Five Mile Bay at the southeast.

Schist Bay is a large bay that forms the northwest corner of the lake. Rocky Point lies between it and the large bay that forms the north end of the lake, where the Kabinakagami River leaves over the Big Rapids. The Kabinakagami River flows via the Kenogami River and Albany River to James Bay.

== History ==
In the late 18th-century, the North West Company (NWC) had a trading outpost on the lake. The Hudson's Bay Company (HBC) also set up a post in 1796, called Cappoonicagomie, but abandoned it around 1806. In 1815, the HBC reestablished the outpost. The following year, both the NWC and HBC posts burned down. The HBC rebuilt that same year. Four years later, a new men's house was built.

The HBC post (called variously over time as Capoonacaugamy, Capenocoggamy, Caponicaugummy, Capoonicaugummie, Kabinakagimi, and Kabinokagami) functioned as an outpost of New Brunswick House for its entire existence. It closed in June 1824. An outpost named Kabinagagamingue operated around 1888, which may have been the same location as Cappoonicagomie. It no longer operated after that year.

== Portages connecting to other drainage basins ==
From Five Mile Bay at the southeast corner of the lake, the Five Mile Portage leads south over Five Mile Creek to the north end of Esnagi Lake on the Magpie River, which empties into Lake Superior, thus providing a connection between the James Bay/Hudson Bay and Great Lakes-Saint Lawrence River drainage basins. A second route from the lake to James Bay is via the Oba River. The Pine Portage leads from Pine Portage Bay to Pine Portage Lake on the Oba River, avoiding several rapids between that point and the river mouth at Kabinakagami Lake. From there, one can travel upstream to the Albany Forks, from which the Mattawitchewan River flows downstream as part of the Missinaibi and Moose rivers into the bay.

== See also ==
- List of lakes in Ontario
