= Flintdale, Ontario =

Flintdale
- Location of Flintdale in Ontario
- Coordinates: 50°03′23″N 85°35′36″W
- Country: Canada
- Province: Ontario
- Region: Northeastern Ontario
- District: Cochrane
- Part: Cochrane, Unorganized, North
- Elevation: 215 m (705 ft)
- Time zone: UTC-5 (Eastern Time Zone)
  - Summer (DST): UTC-4 (Eastern Time Zone)
- Postal code FSA: P0L
- Area codes: 705, 249

Flintdale is an unincorporated place and railway point in geographic Selwyn Township in Unorganized North Cochrane District in northeastern Ontario, Canada.

It is on a now abandoned portion of the Canadian National Railway main line originally constructed as the National Transcontinental Railway transcontinental main line, between the railway points of Blanche to the west and Wilgar to the east, 13 kilometres (8 mi) east southeast of where the line crossed the Kenogami River. It is on the Flint River, part of the James Bay drainage basin, which flows via the Kenogami River and Albany River to James Bay.
