= Pagwa River =

Community in the Cochrane District of Ontario, Canada

Pagwa
- Unincorporated community
- Etymology: Pagwachuan River
- Location of Pagwa in Ontario
- Coordinates: 50°00′49″N 85°13′07″W
- Country: Canada
- Province: Ontario
- District: Cochrane
- Census division: Unorg. North Cochrane
- Founded: 1913
- Elevation: 173 m (566 ft)
- Time zone: UTC-5 (Eastern Time Zone)
  - Summer (DST): UTC-4 (Eastern Time Zone)
- Postal code FSA: P0L
- Area codes: 705, 249

Pagwa River is an unincorporated community in geographic Bicknell Township in Cochrane District, northeastern Ontario, Canada. It is located on and named after the Pagwachuan River, a tributary of the Kenogami River. Its name, an abbreviated form of Pagwachuan, is an indigenous term meaning "shallow".

Pagwa River is along an abandoned portion of the Canadian National Railway main line, originally constructed as the National Transcontinental Railway main line. The railway point, known as just Pagwa, is about 3 kilometres (1.9 mi) west of where the railway crossed the Pagwachuan River, between the railway points of Wilgar to the west and Teltaka to the east.

There is also an abandoned airfield north of the rail line.

== History ==
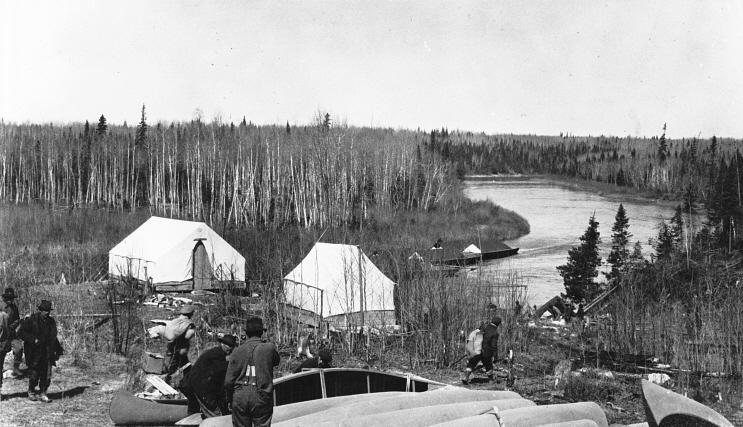
Scow-men preparing to leave Pagwa, Revillon Frères, 1920-30

Pagwa River began as a railway divisional point in 1915 when the National Transcontinental Railway was completed. It was chosen by the Revillon Frères Company as a distribution post to supply their trading posts on James Bay. In May 1916, a fleet of 27 barges of 15 tons each left Pagwa for Fort Albany. After a major fire in Cochrane in July of that same year, the main warehouse of Revillon Frères was relocated to Pagwa River. The company also built a combined store and Manager's residence, a carpentry shop, a small bunkhouse, and cookery, all located north of the rail tracks and directly east of the Pagwachuan River. The community also had a larger bunkhouse south of the railway for temporary workers and other miscellaneous buildings and homes.

Goods transported by rail to Pagwa for the post were unloaded from boxcars onto a long wooden chute that slid the goods downhill to the doorstep of the post. Each year large wooden barges were constructed at Pagwa to float goods by steamer to villages along the Kenogami and Albany Rivers, as far as Ogoki and Fort Albany. The barges were built from douglas-fir timbers brought from British Columbia by rail (R. Ferris, 2010).

In 1932, the Temiskaming and Northern Ontario Railway (now Ontario Northland Railway) was completed from Cochrane to Moosonee, making the transportation route via Pagwa River redundant. Although shipments down the river ceased, Pagwa continued as a trading post. In 1936, it was taken over by the Hudson's Bay Company. The community continued to grow with an Anglican church and school in 1938 (which operated until at least 1971).

In the mid-1930s, an airfield was created by the Department of National Defence, in part using 47,047 person-days of unemployment relief labour. A Frontier College instructor was located at the construction camp. In the late 1930s, the airfield became part of a string of emergency landing sites for Trans-Canada Air Lines (today Air Canada) to support their transcontinental flight operations. From 1952 to 1966, the airfield was an airforce base known as USAF Pagwa Air Station and then RCAF Station Pagwa, and operated as part of the Pinetree Line Early Warning and other subsequent continental defence systems. It was decommissioned in 1968. From 1952 to after 1962, this station was operated by the United States Air Force's 913th Aircraft Control and Warning Squadron.

Commercial activity and population began to decline after the Trans-Canada Highway opened up the region after World War II. In the early 1960s, a road was built from the highway to Pagwa River. In 1967, the Hudson's Bay Company closed its store.

The rail section between Nakina and Calstock was abandoned in 1986. The tracks and the top surface sheathing of the railway bridge are presently removed. The bridge was last used by Thunderhouse Forest Services Inc as access for a treeplanting operation on the west side of the Pagwachuan River in 2006. The Ontario Ministry of Natural Resources, Geraldton Area Office, blocked use of the bridge later that year.

Some of the original townsite has been purchased. Today, there are a few private cottages and seasonal homes, mostly owned by residents of Constance Lake First Nation and Hearst, Ontario. Some residents of Constance Lake today were born at Pagwa and spent many years of their lives there.

== First Nations ==
Constance Lake First Nation, an Oji-Cree First Nation, is home to close to 1,500 members of Ojibway and Cree ancestry, who lived in Pagwa prior to being relocated to their current location. The Constance Lake First Nation is historically linked to the English River band, classified as a branch of the Albany band, by the Treaty 9 Canadian federal officials in 1905. Prior to Treaty 9, according to a 1901 Canadian census, there were 85 people inhabiting the English River area.

Between 1925-1940, many families from English River, Fort Albany, and Moose Factory relocated to Pagwa River to follow employment opportunities. Pagwa was valued by First Nations and the North-West fur traders, as an access route, along with the Albany River, to James Bay and Hudson Bay. By May 1940, the majority of the English River First Nation resided at Pagwa as the English River reserve was "uninhabitable", according to Reverend Clarke who had requested funding for a new school at Pagwa. In 1943, the Department of Indian Affairs began to consider the creation of a new Band for those living at Pagwa which included members of Albany and Moose Factory (Attawapiskat) Bands who also resided at Pagwa. In the 1940s, Constance Lake First Nation "absorbed essentially the whole of the English River Band and also members of the Albany and Moose Factory Bands who lived nearby."
