= Jobrin, Ontario =

Jobrin
- Location of Jobrin in Ontario
- Coordinates: 50°07′04″N 86°06′19″W
- Country: Canada
- Province: Ontario
- Region: Northeastern Ontario
- District: Cochrane
- Part: Cochrane, Unorganized, North
- Elevation: 295 m (968 ft)
- Time zone: UTC-5 (Eastern Time Zone)
  - Summer (DST): UTC-4 (Eastern Time Zone)
- Postal code FSA: P0L
- Area codes: 705, 249

Jobrin is an unincorporated place and community in the Unorganized North Part of Cochrane District in northeastern Ontario, Canada.

It was a railway station at mile 116.5 on a now abandoned portion of the Pagwa Subdivision, Cochrane Division of the Canadian National Railway main line originally constructed as the Hearst Subdivision, District 2 of the National Transcontinental Railway transcontinental main line, between the railway points of Grant to the west and Lynx to the east.

Jobrin is between Jobrin Creek (itself between Upper Jobrin Lake upstream and Jobrin Lake downstream) to the west, and the Atikasibi River to the east. Both are part of the James Bay drainage basin, and both flow to the Kenogami River: Jobrin Creek south to Chipman Lake, and the Atikasibi River northeast.
