= Pagwa =

Pagwa may refer to:

- Pagwa (festival), an Indian spring festival
- Pagwa River, Ontario, a community in Cochrane District, Ontario, Canada
- RCAF Station Pagwa, a former Royal Canadian Air Force station near Pagwa River
- Pagwa (HBC vessel), operated by the HBC from 1923 to 1924, see Hudson's Bay Company vessels
