= Pelican Lake (Cochrane District, Ontario) =

Lake in Cochrane District, Ontario, Canada

- Location within Ontario
- Location: Cochrane District, Ontario
- Coordinates: 49°54′31″N 84°08′08″W
- Basin countries: Canada
- Max. length: 0.94 km (0.58 mi)
- Max. width: 0.12 km (0.075 mi)
- Surface elevation: 222 m (728 ft)

Pelican Lake is one of a trio of lakes that form a small endorheic basin in Cochrane District, Ontario, Canada. It is about 940 metres (3,084 ft) long and 120 metres (394 ft) wide and lies at an elevation of 222 metres (728 ft). The lake lies about 13 kilometres (8 mi) north of the community of Calstock.

The primary inflow is a small creek that starts at Ptarmigan Lake, then flows through Swallow Lake before reaching Pelican Lake, which has no outlet.

== See also ==
- List of lakes in Ontario
