= Ptarmigan Lake (Ontario) =

Lake in Ontario, Canada

- Location within Ontario
- Location: Cochrane District, Ontario
- Coordinates: 49°55′51″N 84°08′30″W
- Basin countries: Canada
- Max. length: 0.27 km (0.17 mi)
- Max. width: 0.12 km (0.075 mi)
- Surface elevation: 224 m (735 ft)

Ptarmigan Lake is one of a trio of lakes that form a small endorheic basin in Cochrane District, Ontario, Canada. It is about 270 metres (886 ft) long and 120 metres (394 ft) wide and lies at an elevation of 224 metres (735 ft). The lake lies about 16 kilometres (10 mi) north of the community of Calstock.

The primary outflow is a small creek that flows through Swallow Lake to Pelican Lake, which has no outlet.

== See also ==
- List of lakes in Ontario
