= Fox River (Cochrane District) =

- Location of the mouth of the Fox River in Ontario

Location
- Country: Canada
- Province: Ontario
- Region: Northeastern Ontario
- District: Cochrane

Physical characteristics
- Source: Fox Lake
  - location: Bannerman Township
  - coordinates: 49°53′25″N 83°51′27″W
  - elevation: 235 m (771 ft)
- Mouth: Kabinakagami River
  - coordinates: 50°12′53″N 84°13′29″W
  - elevation: 98 m (322 ft)

Basin features
- River system: James Bay drainage basin

The Fox River is a river in Cochrane District in Northeastern Ontario, Canada. It is in the James Bay drainage basin and is a right tributary of the Kabinakagami River.

== Course ==
The river begins at Fox Lake in geographic Bannerman Township, and flows north through Little Grassy Lake and Bannerman Lake, then continues north out of the township. It turns west and then northwest, and reaches its mouth at the Kabinakagami River. The Kabinakagami River flows via the Kenogami River and the Albany River to James Bay.

== See also ==
- List of rivers of Ontario

== Sources ==
- Map 14 (PDF) (Map). 1 : 1,600,000. Official road map of Ontario. Ministry of Transportation of Ontario. 2014.
- Restructured municipalities - Ontario map #3 (Map). Restructuring Maps of Ontario. Ontario Ministry of Municipal Affairs and Housing. 2006. Archived from the original on 2014-04-10.
