= Mammamattawa, Ontario =

Mammamattawa
- Dispersed rural community
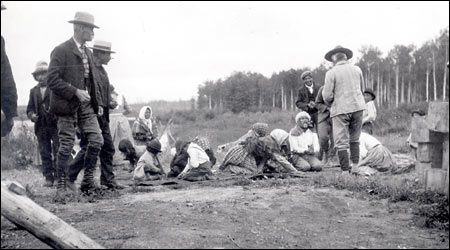
- Indians at English River Post, 1905

- Location of Mammamattawa in Ontario
- Coordinates: 50°24′40″N 84°21′59″W
- Country: Canada
- Province: Ontario
- Region: Northeastern Ontario
- District: Cochrane
- Part: Cochrane, Unorganized, North
- Elevation: 88 m (289 ft)
- Time zone: UTC-5 (Eastern Time Zone)
  - Summer (DST): UTC-4 (Eastern Time Zone)
- Postal code FSA: P0L
- Area codes: 705, 249

Mammamattawa is a dispersed rural community and unincorporated place in the Unorganized North Part of Cochrane District in northeastern Ontario, Canada. It is located at the mouth of the Kabinakagami River at the Kenogami River, just 2 kilometres (1.2 mi) downstream of the mouth of the Nagagami River at the Kenogami, in the James Bay drainage basin.

The Constance Lake First Nation operates a camp at Mammamattawa.

== History ==
The first inland post of the Hudson's Bay Company, named Henley House, was established at the confluence of the Kenogami River and Albany River in 1743. A new post was established in 1884 at the confluence of the Kenogami River and the Kabinakagami River. It was known as the English River Post, as the Kenogami was also known as the English River. The English River First Nation, the primary forerunner to today's Constance Lake First Nation, had a reserve set aside for their use just north of the post in 1912, which remains part of the Constance Lake First Nations lands as English River 66 Indian Reserve. The Hudson's Bay Company English River Post was abandoned in 1941, and the place later took on its present First Nations name.

== Vegetation ==
Mammamattawa lies in the Hudson Bay Lowlands section of the Boreal Forest and its surroundings are mostly bogs or fens with some stunted black spruce and tamarack. Mammamattawa itself is on an alluvial site which is excellent for vegetation growth and supports a black ash-American elm association sheltering northern outposts of ostrich fern, nodding trillium, smooth yellow violet and wild ginger. Tall white spruce grows on top of the riverbank.
