= Swallow Lake (Cochrane District) =

Lake in Cochrane District, Ontario, Canada

- Location within Ontario
- Location: Cochrane District, Ontario
- Coordinates: 49°55′13″N 84°08′09″W
- Basin countries: Canada
- Max. length: 0.43 km (0.27 mi)
- Max. width: 0.14 km (0.087 mi)
- Surface elevation: 223 m (732 ft)

Swallow Lake is one of a trio of lakes that form a small endorheic basin in Cochrane District, Ontario, Canada. It is about 430 metres (1,411 ft) long and 140 metres (459 ft) wide and lies at an elevation of 223 metres (732 ft). The lake lies about 15 kilometres (9 mi) north of the community of Calstock.

The primary inflow is a small creek that starts at Ptarmigan Lake that then flows out from Swallow Lake to Pelican Lake, which has no outlet.

== See also ==
- List of lakes in Ontario
