= Henley River =

- Location of the mouth of the Henley River in Ontario

Location
- Country: Canada
- Province: Ontario
- Region: Northwestern Ontario
- District: Kenora

Physical characteristics
- Source: Unnamed lake
  - coordinates: 51°22′21″N 84°47′10″W
  - elevation: 160 m (520 ft)
- Mouth: Albany River
  - coordinates: 51°14′17″N 84°19′34″W
  - elevation: 67 m (220 ft)

Basin features
- River system: Hudson Bay drainage basin

The Henley River is a river in Kenora District in Northwestern Ontario, Canada. The river is in the Hudson Bay drainage basin and is a left tributary of the Albany River. From 1768 until 1850, the majority of its existence, the Hudson's Bay Company Henley House was at the mouth of the river; prior to that, it was on the opposite (left) bank to the confluence of the Kenogami River with the Albany River, just 8 miles (13 km) upstream.

== See also ==
- List of rivers of Ontario

== Sources ==
- Map 17 (PDF) (Map). 1 : 1,600,000. Official road map of Ontario. Ministry of Transportation of Ontario. 2010-01-01.
