= Summit Lake (Kabinakagami River) =

Lake in Algoma District, Ontario, Canada

- Location within Ontario
- Location: Algoma District, Ontario
- Coordinates: 48°28′31″N 84°52′01″W
- Primary outflows: Kabinakagami River
- Basin countries: Canada
- Max. length: 1.0 km (0.62 mi)
- Max. width: 0.2 km (0.12 mi)
- Surface elevation: 442 m (1,450 ft)

Location of Summit Lake in Ontario

Summit Lake is a lake in the James Bay drainage basin in the Unorganized North Part of Algoma District in northeastern Ontario, Canada. It is the source of the Kabinakagami River, which flows via the Kenogami River and Albany River to James Bay. The lake is about 1.0 kilometre (0.6 mi) long and 0.2 kilometres (0.1 mi) wide, lies at an elevation of 442 metres (1,450 ft), and there are no significant inflows.

The Canadian Pacific Railway transcontinental main line (used at this point by the Via Rail Sudbury – White River train service) runs along the entire south shore; the lake lies between the railway points of Amyot to the west and Girdwood to the east. As well, it is about 32 kilometres (20 mi) southeast of the community of White River and 27 kilometres (17 mi) northeast of Dubreuilville.

== See also ==
- List of lakes in Ontario
