= Tom Burrows (artist) =

- Education: University of British Columbia, (BFA, Art History)
- Known for: conceptual art, sculpture

Tom Burrows (born 1940) is a Canadian artist working on various media. He is particularly known for employing squatting as a means for sculpture and photographic representations, as well as working with recycled materials and houses. He lives in Vancouver, BC.

== Biography ==
Burrows was born in Galt, Ontario in 1940. In his early years, Burrows received art lessons from his artist sister Mary and brother-in-law Toni Onley, but his interest in artistic practice began mainly when he returned from London to the University of British Columbia in the mid-1960s, in order to study art history and poetry. He completed his Bachelor of Arts in Art History from the University of British Columbia in 1967, and then pursued post-graduate education at St. Martin's School of Art, London, UK, until 1969. When the artist returned to Vancouver from London in 1969, he joined the mudflats community. Influenced by the events of May 1968, he deemed squatting a form of art open to all. In January 1972 he signed a contract with the Vancouver Art Gallery and was responsible for creating a sculpture in Auckland, New Zealand, representing Canada at a Pacific Rim Symposium.

== Artistic practice ==
Throughout his career, Tom Burrows has produced a range of sculptural and wall-based works, many of whuch use cast polymer resin to create luminous monochrome surfaces. Notable works include Mudflat Sculptures (1970–1971), a series connected to the artist's time living at the Maplewood Mudflats in North Vancouver. Later works such as Blanket Statement and Milky Way explore language and wordplay through abstract wall pieces, while Organ Transplant (1987) incorporates sculptural form with repeated text elements. He also created assemblages that discuss issues of social justice unambiguously. He employs a wide variety of materials to illustrate simple social elements so as to make the didactic reverberant. For instance: Out of Site, Out of Mind is a ladder made of lead. the top ring of which extends into two outstretched arms framing a framed xerox of a man stretched sleeping on a subway grate, his crutched beside him. Other works include the photographic piece No Sleep (2006) and resin panel works such as Aqua (1998) and Untitled (2000), which exemplify his long-term exploration of colour, surface, and light through layered polymer materials. More recent works include large resin panels such as Orca Chant (Dyptych) 2024.

== Select Artworks ==
He is known particularly for his work Conjugality, made in 1966, with which he moved from painting to sculpture, as well as the Mudflat Sculptures, made in 1969 with gelatin silver print.

== Select exhibitions ==
- 2025: "Clam," Bau-Xi Gallery, Vancouver, BC
- 2024: "Black and White and Everything In Between: A Monochrome Journey," Vancouver Art Gallery, Vancouver, BC
- 2024: "Gallery Artists | Sculpture Feature," Bau-Xi Gallery, Vancouver, BC
- 2023: “Lunar Cycles | from The Curve of Time Series”, Bau-Xi Vancouver, BC
- 2015: "Retrospective," Morris and Helen Belkin Gallery, UBC Vancouver
- 2010: “Polar,” Foster/White Gallery, Seattle, WA
- 2007: “Rosebud,” Foster/White Gallery, Seattle, WA
- 2003 “Tom Burrows”, C.A.U.S.A., Vancouver, BC
- 1994: "Drawn Objects & Blanket Statements", Canadian Embassy, Tokyo, Japan
- 1990: "Artropolis '90", Vancouver, BC

== Awards and recognition ==
- 2010: Hnatyshyn Foundation Award for Curatorial Excellence in Contemporary Art
- 2008: Alvin Balkind Award for Creative Curatorship in BC Arts
- 2005: UBC Dorothy Somerset Award for Performance Development in the Visual and Performing Arts
