= English River 66 =

- Indian reserve
- English River Indian Reserve No. 66
- Location of the English River 66 reserve in Ontario
- Coordinates: 50°27′55″N 84°22′10″W
- Country: Canada
- Province: Ontario
- District: Cochrane
- First Nation: Constance Lake
- Established: 1912

Area
  - Land: 31.08 km^{2} (12.00 sq mi)
- Time zone: UTC-5 (Eastern Time Zone)
  - Summer (DST): UTC-4 (Eastern Time Zone)

English River 66 is a First Nations reserve in Cochrane District, Ontario, Canada, located adjacent to the settlement of Mammamattawa and just downstream of the mouth of the Kabinakagami River at the Kenogami River. It is one of two reserves of the Constance Lake First Nation, and has an area of 3,108 hectares (7,680 acres).

== History ==
A Hudson's Bay Company trading post was established in 1884 at the confluence of the Kenogami and Kabinakagami Rivers. It was known as the English River Post, as the Kenogami was also known as the English River. The English River First Nation, the primary forerunner to today's Constance Lake First Nation, had a reserve set aside for their use just north of the post in 1912, which remains part of the Constance Lake First Nations lands as English River 66 Indian Reserve.
