= Henley House =

Post in Ontario, Canada

Coordinates: 51°14′17″N 84°19′34″W

Henley House, the first inland post established by the Hudson's Bay Company, was located in what is now Kenora District, Ontario, Canada. It was strategically situated west of James Bay about 160 miles (257 km) up the east-flowing Albany River at the mouth of the Henley River, 8 miles (13 km) downstream of the confluence of the major north-flowing Kenogami River with the Albany. From the head of the Albany at Lake St. Joseph, a portage led west to Lac Seul from which the English River (Ontario) led to the Winnipeg River and westward. The Kenogami led south toward Wawa, Ontario, but that does not seem to have been a practical canoe route all the way to Lake Superior.

In 1685, just before the Hudson Bay expedition (1686) the French built Fort des Français at the future site of Henley House. In 1743, Joseph Isbister, the head of Fort Albany, at the mouth of the Albany, decided to reverse long-standing policy and build an inland post upriver. That was an isolated event since the HBC directors did not support inland forts until 1775. It was intended not as a full trading post but as a sort of "pit stop" to help the Indians continue down the river and to discourage them from trading with the coureurs des bois. The first Henley House was built on the north bank of the Albany opposite the mouth of the Kenogami River. It is typical of the time's HBC that the men had difficulty running the boats upriver since they had no woodland skills.

In 1754, local Cree attacked the post in retribution for the sexual misconduct of its manager William Lamb and killed four men. Indigenous women were being unwillingly held at the post, and it is rumoured that the French may have encouraged the attack. Isbister captured and hung three of the murderers. For this action he was dismissed from the HBC service. The burnt fort was quickly rebuilt on the same site. In 1759, at the height of the Seven Years' War, it was attacked again by a group of Indians and French-Canadians. They waited until most of the men were away at Fort Albany. One man was killed and the three survivors held out in the fort until nightfall when they slipped out, went downriver and met the men returning from Fort Albany and the whole group returned to Fort Albany.

In 1768, a second Henley House was built on an island 8 miles downstream from the first. From 1775 the HBC started copying the French policy of trading in the interior. Henley House became a proper trading post and returned 2,000 made beaver in one year, about a tenth of the James Bay production.

In 1777, Gloucester House was built 234 miles (377 km) further upstream. and Henley House was used as a base for westward exploration by Philip Turnor and others. In 1782, the post burned down but was quickly rebuilt. The post continued until around 1850, but by 1880, no vestiges of it remained. Today, both sites are covered with forest. From 1884 to 1941, there was an HBC post called English River Post 50 miles (80 km) up the Kenogami at Mammamattawa, Ontario.

== Sources ==
- Browne Losey, Elizabeth (1999). Let Them Be Remembered: The Story of the Fur Trade Forts. New York: Vantage Press. ISBN 9780533125722. OCLC 44722618.
- Arthur S Morton, "A History of the Canadian West", no date
