= Grant, Ontario =

Grant
- Location of Grant in Ontario
- Coordinates: 50°07′35″N 86°18′01″W
- Country: Canada
- Province: Ontario
- Region: Northeastern Ontario
- District: Cochrane
- Part: Cochrane, Unorganized, North
- Elevation: 303 m (994 ft)
- Time zone: UTC-5 (Eastern Time Zone)
  - Summer (DST): UTC-4 (Eastern Time Zone)
- Postal code FSA: P0L
- Area codes: 705, 249

Grant is an unincorporated place, former railway point and ghost town in the Unorganized North Part of Cochrane District in northeastern Ontario, Canada, located 25.5 kilometres (15.8 mi) east of Nakina, Ontario.

== History ==
The town came into being with the construction of the National Transcontinental Railway (NTR) in 1913. It was established as a divisional point between the Grant Subdivision, leading 131.23 miles (211.19 km) west to the next divisional point of Armstrong, and the Hearst Subdivision, District 2, leading 125.11 miles (201.35 km) east to the next divisional point of Hearst. The National Transcontinental Railway was 1,804.7 miles (2,904.4 km) in length, from Moncton, New Brunswick, to Winnipeg, Manitoba. The last spike of the NTR was driven at Grant on November 17, 1913, 1,283.2 miles (2,065.1 km) west of Moncton.This information is suspect. The November 1913 issue of Canadian and Marine World makes reference to a November 17, 1913 press dispatch from Cochrane, Ontario which states that the last section of steel on the NTR was laid 200 miles East of Cochrane near Nellie Lake.

The town of Grant lost its importance as a railway divisional point following the 1924 completion of the Longlac-Nakina Cut-Off. The Canadian National Railway, which had assumed control of both the National Transcontinental Railway and the Canadian Northern railway, built this new section of line to connect the two transcontinental main lines. At that time most of the buildings were removed to the new divisional point at Nakina at Mile 15.9 of the former Grant Sub-Division. The portion of the former NTR from Hearst to Nakina became the Pagwa Sub-Division, with Grant located at mile 125.1, between the railway points of Opemisha to the west and Jobrin to the east. By 1960, this section track was part of a marginal secondary main line, with little in the way of through freight, or passenger traffic. A 122-mile (196 km) section of this line between Nakina and Calstock, the route through Grant, was abandoned in 1986.

A now abandoned airfield, created by the Department of National Defence in the mid-1930s in part using 4,281 person-days of unemployment relief labour, lies to the south of the place. The airfield became in the late 1930s part of a string of emergency landing sites for Trans-Canada Air Lines (today Air Canada) to support their transcontinental flight operations.
