= Lake Storm Aphid =

2006 severe snowstorm in Buffalo, New York

Coordinates: 42.911°N 78.720°W

October Storm
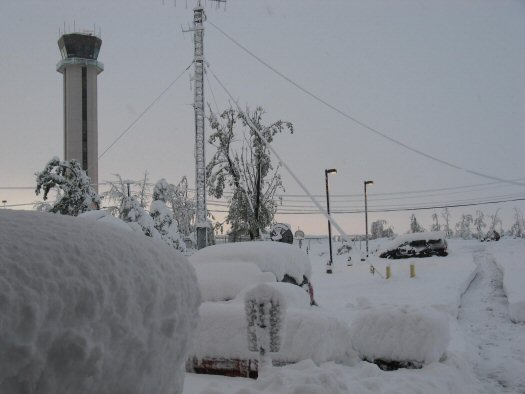
- Accumulation at the Buffalo Airport and NWS office

Meteorological history
- Formed: October 11, 2006
- Dissipated: October 13, 2006

Blizzard
- Lowest pressure: 980 hPa (mbar); 28.94 inHg
- Max. snowfall: 24 inches (61 cm)

Overall effects
- Fatalities: 13
- Damage: US$530 million
- Areas affected: Erie County, Genesee County, Orleans County, Niagara County, Niagara Region
- Power outages: 400,000
- Part of the 2006–07 North American winter storms

The October Storm was an unusual early-season lake effect snow storm that hit the Buffalo, New York, area and other surrounding areas of the United States and Canada, from the afternoon of Thursday, October 12 through the morning of Friday, October 13, 2006. It was called Lake Storm Aphid by the National Weather Service office in Buffalo, in accordance with their naming scheme for lake-effect snowstorms for that year, which related to insects, though locals never used that terminology and have simply referred to it as the October Surprise or the October Storm or Arborgeddon.

== History ==
On October 6, 2006, the first concerns of a possible lake-effect snow (LES) event were raised, as medium and long range numerical weather models began to indicate conditions would be potentially favorable for lake effect precipitation, resulting in mixed snow-rain conditions. The long term forecast from the Buffalo office of the National Weather Service (NWS), as well as the Environment Canada discussion, both indicated possible LESs, but predicted that accumulations would be minimal.

By October 9, however, forecasters became concerned, given the high snow fall rates typical of snow squalls, accumulations would be possible even with temperatures above the freezing mark.

The Buffalo NWS and associated weather offices in the U.S and Canada did not issue any special advisories or make significant mention of the possibility of a major snow fall event until early afternoon on October 11. The NWS Buffalo issued a special advisory for the possibility of LES with minor accumulations of less than 2 inches (5.1 cm). Environment Canada followed suit issuing a special weather advisory for Canadian areas which would also be affected.

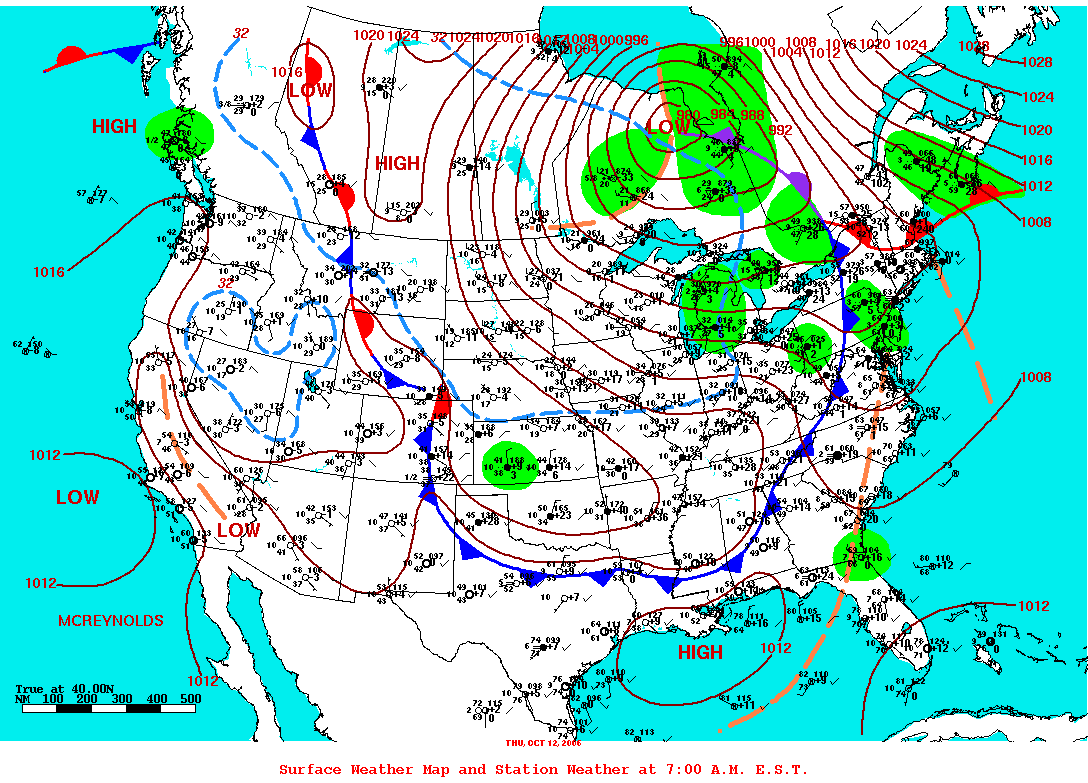
US Weather Map showing the low pressure system on October 12th, which was responsible for setting up the correct wind field and temperature gradient for lake effect snow off Lake Erie

The warm front associated with the developing low pressure system brought rain and thunderstorms to much of western New York and southern Ontario since the early morning hours of the 11th. The quickly approaching cold front passed the Port Colborne reporting station in Ontario at 11:35 pm EST October 11 and the Buffalo Airport reporting station at 12:46 am EST October 12. With the passage of the cold front, polar continental air began to flood in behind it, and by 3:30 am EST, a lake effect squall began to form over Lake Erie in the strong westerly winds. The first lake effect rain was reported at 3:54 am EST at the Buffalo Airport.

The morning of October 12 saw the first deep concern among forecasters that a large snowfall event was possible. Indications at the time were still mainly that of a rainfall event with ice pellets and some wet snow mixed in. Towards the afternoon of the October 12, a warning was issued by the NWS Buffalo for the possibility of one to six inches of wet snow. Environment Canada also released a similar warning, advising the public that conditions like those found in typical winter LESs were possible, although only minor accumulation was expected, if any. On that day, the NWS Buffalo dubbed the storm "Lake Storm Aphid", in accordance with their naming scheme for lake-effect storms for that year.

The first reports of ice in the form of small hail and ice pellets were reported at the Buffalo Airport at 12:14 pm, the temperature at the time was 41 °F (5 °C) after which it fell to 37 °F (3 °C) by 1:00 pm and 36 °F (2 °C) by 1:38 pm. Then at 1:51 pm, the first rain-snow mix was reported, and by 2:09 pm the rain had changed over entirely to snow, with the temperature dropping to 33.8 °F (1.0 °C) by 2:13 pm. This prompted the NWS in Buffalo to issue a LES warning at 2:36 pm for Niagara, Orleans, Northern Erie and Genesee counties. The warning, which would become effective as of 8:00 pm through to 6:00 am, called for one to three inches of snow, with possible accumulations of up to 6 inches (150 mm) well inland; the warning also made specific mention of possible tree damage and power outages.

The changeover to snow resulted from increased mixing within the squall; as colder air continued to flood in from the west, the atmosphere continued to destabilize vertically as the temperature difference between the lake water and the air several kilometers above grew larger. This allowed the squall to grow vertically in height and achieve much faster updraft speeds. At the 2:54 pm, radar indicated the first 20,000 ft (6,100 m) echo-top; at the same time, lightning was detected.

Despite heavy snow at times, accumulation was limited to grassy areas and locations which were not in direct contact with the ground, such as tree branches and power lines. The first notable ground accumulations started to occur just after 4:54 pm, when snow fall rates jumped to 1 inch per hour (2.5 cm/h) within thunderstorms inside the squall. At 6:48 pm, the NWS decided to update the LES warning, making it effective immediately and emphasizing extensive tree damage and the loss of power was imminent. By 8:00 pm, numerous reports of downed trees and power lines, and other damage began to flood the NWS Buffalo offices; by this time 3 in (7 cm) had accumulated on the ground.

As much as 24 inches (61 cm) fell in the Buffalo area, but in the nearby greater Toronto area, there was no snowstorm at all.

== Timeline ==
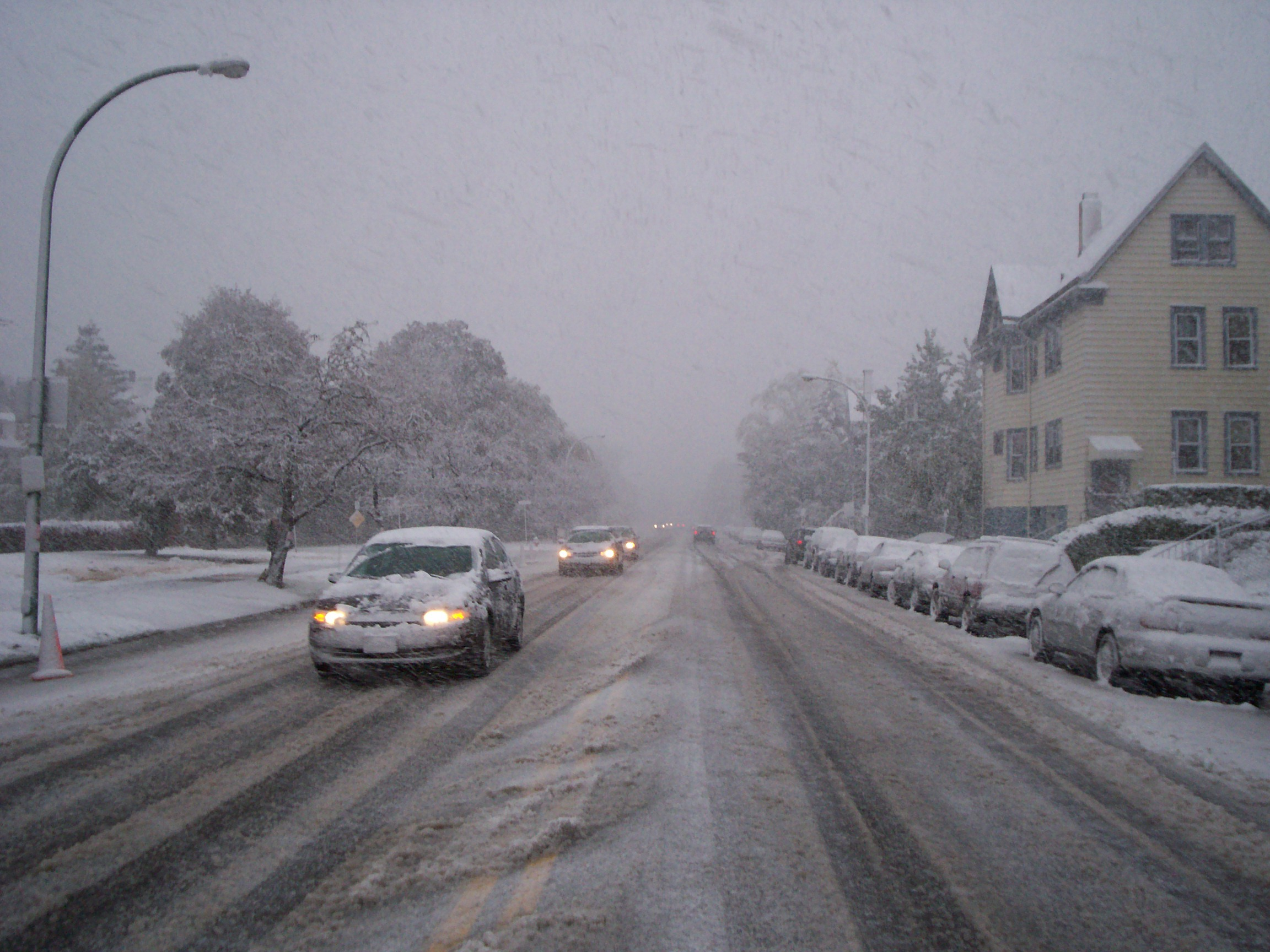
Looking to the east on Forest and Elmwood Avenues in Buffalo, New York during the early stages of the lake effect snow storm

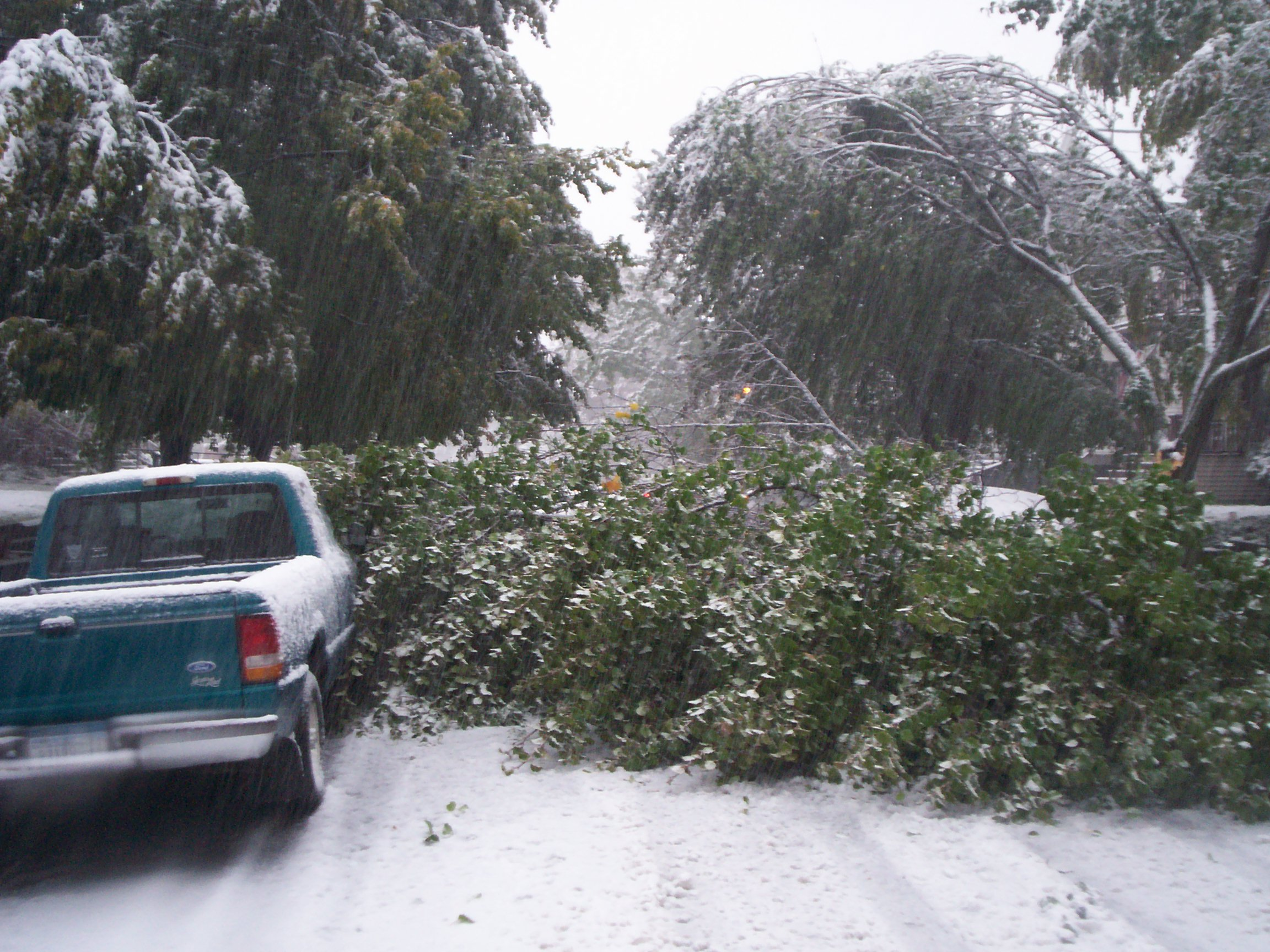
A tree limb falls onto a truck on Granger Place in Buffalo

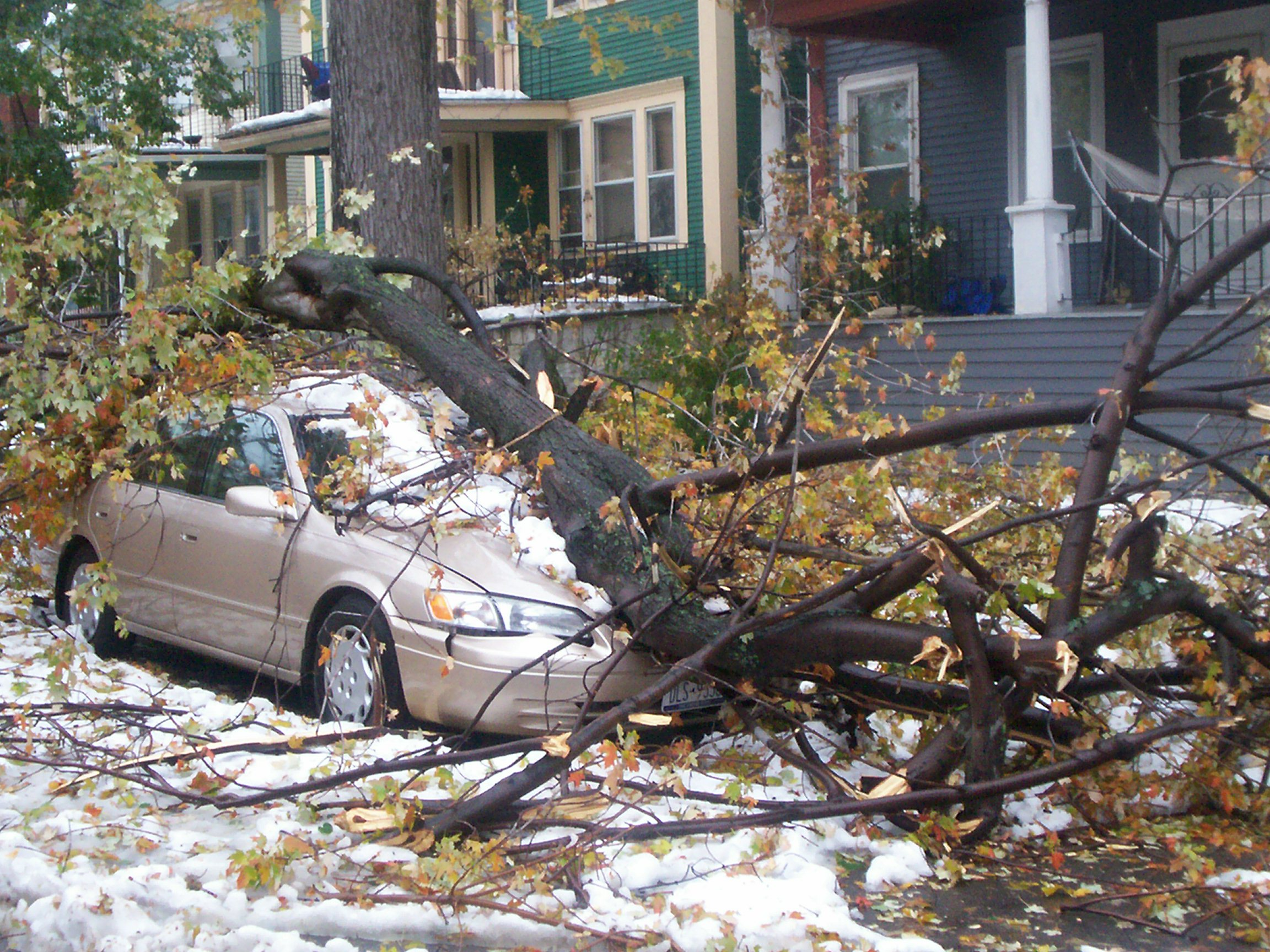
A car is crushed by a tree limb on Potomac off Elmwood Avenue in Buffalo, New York

- October 1 - Long range numerical weather models show a deep low affecting the Great Lakes basin
- October 6 - Possibility of LES cited by NWS offices, numerical models mainly see rain
- October 7 - Chance of lake effect rain included in Buffalo area forecast, with a slight possibility of flurries above 1,300 ft (400 m)
- October 9 - Chance of wet flurries mentioned at lower levels, NWS sees possibility of accumulating snows at higher elevations
- October 10 - Frontal zone develops over northern Minnesota - southern Manitoba.
- October 11 - Two low pressure systems form and merge over northern Michigan before racing north
  - 11:35 PM - Cold front passes Port Colborne reporting station in Ontario
- October 12 - Low pressure system deepens to 980mb and becomes centered 140 km west of Attawapiskat
  - 12:46 AM - Cold front passes Buffalo Airport reporting station
  - 3:30 AM - Squall begins to form over Lake Erie
  - 3:54 AM - Lake effect rain first reported at the Buffalo Airport
  - 12:14 PM - Small hail and ice pellets reported at Buffalo Airport, temperature 41 °F (5 °C)
  - 1:00 PM - Temperature falls to 37 °F (3 °C) at Buffalo Airport
  - 1:38 PM - Temperature falls to 36 °F (2 °C) at Buffalo Airport
  - 1:51 PM - Snow-rain mix reported at Buffalo Airport
  - 2:36 PM - NWS Buffalo issues LES warning
  - 2:54 PM - Radar detects first 20,000 ft (6 km) echo top, first lightning detected as well
  - 4:54 PM - Snow begins to accumulate as snowfall rates reach 1.18 in (3 cm) per hour, heavy thunderstorms reported
  - 7:30 PM - Buffalo Airport grounds all flights due to weather conditions
  - 8:00 PM - NWS Buffalo begins to receive numerous reports of trees and power lines toppling after 3 in (7 cm) of snow accumulates
  - 9:15 PM - Ontario Provincial Police close the Niagara section of the QEW
  - 10:25 PM - New York State Thruway closes at Interstate 190, the Niagara Thruway
  - 10:25 PM - Peace Bridge border crossing is closed
- October 13 - Low pressure system sinks south and becomes stationary over Pagwa River
  - Many schools and community centers are opened to the public as evacuation centers for people who have lost power and heat due to the storm
  - 2:00 AM - Buffalo Airport reports 10.0 in (25.4 cm) of snow accumulation
  - 8:00 AM - Buffalo Airport reports 22.0 in (55.9 cm) of snow accumulation
  - 10:30 AM - Amherst, New York, reports 24 in (60.96 cm) of snow accumulations, breaking an all-time record
- October 15 - Remaining snow fully melts
- October 23 - Most schools in the affected areas reopen
- October 24 - Erie, Genesee, Orleans and Niagara Counties in western New York are declared a "major disaster" area by President George W. Bush
- October 26 - Schools in Amherst reopen for the first time since the storm began
- October 27 - Schools in Hamburg reopen after repairs are finished to buildings affected by power loss and building damages

== Accumulation ==
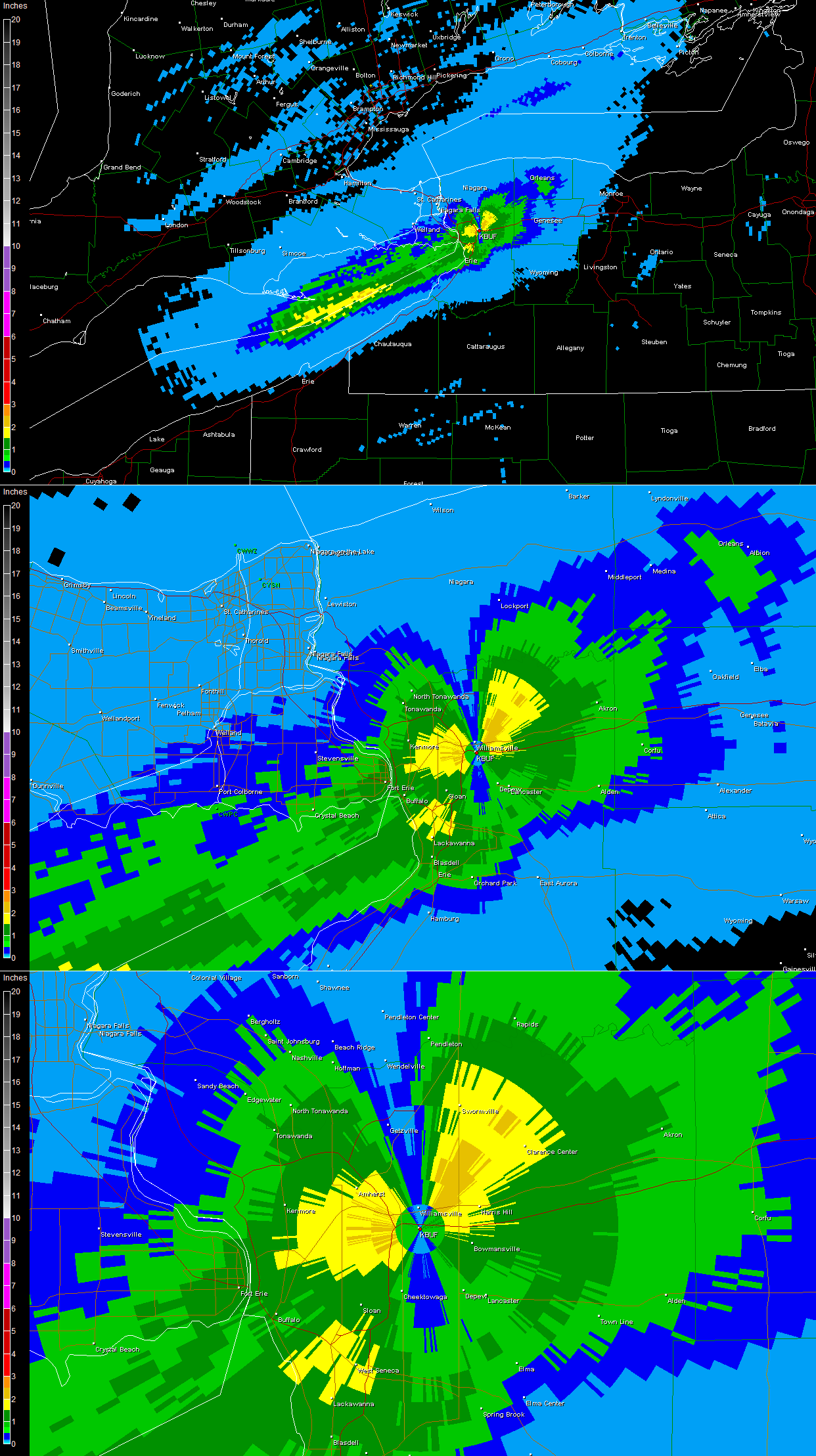
NWS Buffalo radar estimated liquid accumulation

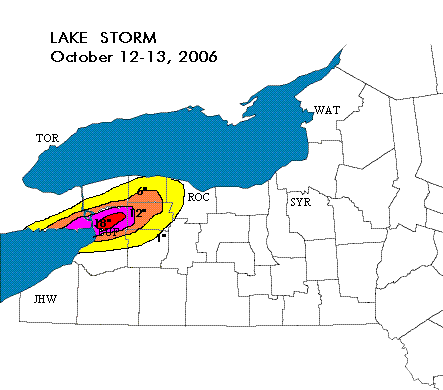
Accumulation track in inches (NWS)

Locations in US	Snowfall
Lancaster/Depew	24 inches
Alden (Millgrove)	24 inches
Cheektowaga (NWS)	22.6 inches
Buffalo (North)	20 inches
Buffalo (Downtown)	15 inches
Buffalo (South)	10 inches
Amherst	14 to 22 inches
Clarence	16 to 22 inches
Tonawanda	12 to 18 inches
West Seneca	14 inches
North Tonawanda	6 to 12 inches
Hamburg	8 to 14 inches
Orchard Park	8 inches
Batavia	10 inches
Medina	8 inches
Lockport	6 to 8 inches
Grand Island	2 to 10 inches
Albion	5 inches
Brockport	3 inches
Niagara Falls, New York	1 inch
Locations in Canada	Accumulations (cm)
Fort Erie, Ontario	30
Niagara Falls, Ontario	Trace
Port Colborne, Ontario	15

== Impact ==
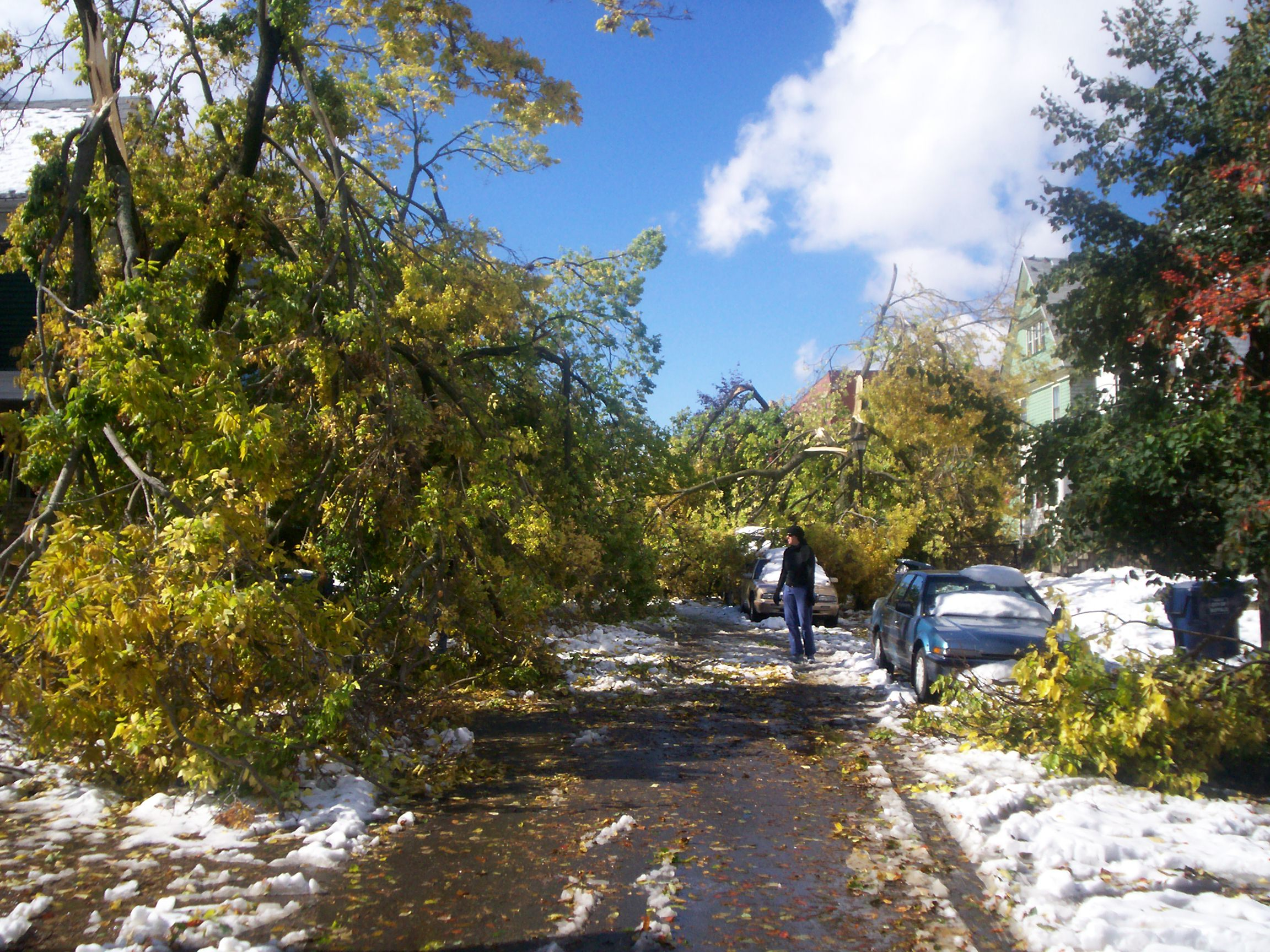
Looking westward on Bird Avenue in Buffalo, New York just off Elmwood Avenue, the street is completely blocked by extensive tree damage

The storm's effects were highly localized: it dumped up to 2 feet (61 cm) of snow on some areas of the Buffalo metro region, while other areas saw very little snow, or no snow at all. The event was described by the NWS Office in Buffalo, New York, as "astounding", "unbelievable" and "incredible" and by the Toronto Star as "one of the most devastating snow storms in US history". It was also an example of the "particularly rare meteorological phenomenon" known as thundersnow.

These were the two snowiest October days recorded in Buffalo since the NWS began keeping track 137 years ago.

In affected areas, wet, heavy lake effect snow with a snow-water equivalent (SWE) ratio of between 6:1 and 12:1 (in comparison, the "powder" so prized by skiers is 25:1) and with a weight in excess of 9.8 pounds per square foot) piled onto trees which were still in full leaf, leading to significant damage [to trees] on a scale usually associated with hurricanes. An estimated 400,000 people were without power on Friday the 13th, some 100,000 households remained without power for a week, and a few thousand remained without power for ten days.

During the power outage, whenever generators went on sale, they typically ran out within thirty minutes. Lowe's and Home Depot stores were sold out immediately after the storm hit. Despite the conditions, a Buffalo Sabres hockey game against the New York Rangers was not postponed at HSBC Arena despite the power outage, and the game still had a full attendance of 18,690.

Effects of the storm were responsible for three fatalities between Thursday night, when the storm hit, and Friday morning, two from automobile accidents, and one from a falling branch. Ten more deaths followed in the first days of the aftermath, some from pre-existing health (usually heart) conditions and other causes, and several from carbon monoxide poisoning. Injuries blamed on the storm and its aftermath numbered in the several hundred and included those from chainsaw accidents and carbon monoxide poisoning due to people running generators inside homes.

Conservative initial damage estimates to clean up the estimated 6 to 8.6 million cubic yards of debris were at least US$130 million, but even ten days after the storm hit, estimates of the number of tons of debris and the final costs of clearing them were "a moving target". The storm closed the Buffalo-Niagara International Airport for several hours on Thursday, October 12, and again on Friday, October 13, and closed a 100-mile (160-km) stretch of the New York State Thruway for several hours on Friday, October 13. Many, if not most, businesses were closed for at least a few days, and schools for at least a week. Most schools reopened on Monday, October 23, after six consecutive "snow days", but a few in the most heavily affected areas reopened later that week. Affected parts of Erie, Genesee, Orleans and Niagara counties in Western New York were declared a "major disaster" area by President George W. Bush on October 24, 2006.

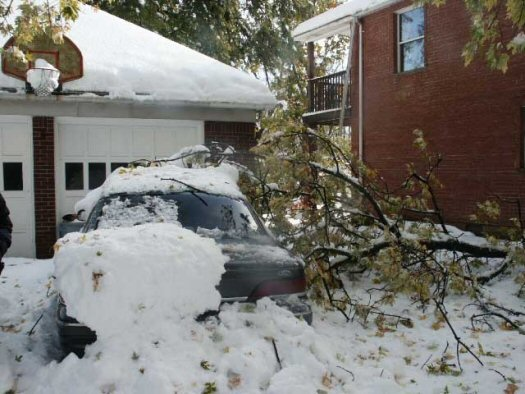
Damage in the Buffalo Metro area

As many as 90 percent of the city's trees were estimated to be damaged, including many in the city's cherished parks and parkways, which were designed by landscape architect Frederick Law Olmsted. The damage constituted a significant setback to Buffalo's urban reforestation agenda, which had aimed to increase the city's tree canopy from its estimated 2003 levels of 12% to more closely approach the national average of 30%. Buffalo's suburbs, also hard hit by the storm, do have a canopy cover approaching 20 to 30%.

Although the two-foot snow cover melted by October 15, cleanup efforts were impeded in the first days after the storm by the tangle of fallen trees, fallen branches and downed power lines: power grid crews could not reach the downed power lines because of fallen trees, and tree removal crews could not clear debris because of the dangers of the downed power lines. Even after roads were cleared and power was restored, the cleanup and restoration was estimated to take weeks or months.

== Response ==
Each jurisdiction had very similar Emergency Operation Plans and this made for a very consistent manner in how activities such as clean-up and response would be organized. Initially, the snow of this storm began to fall just like any other day in the winter season throughout the Buffalo region. Local fire departments were the first to respond to tree limbs blocking road ways, car accidents, and other incidents on top of "usual calls for help". As the storm worsened, police departments had officers staged at major intersections to help in the direction of traffic. Highway departments were called back into work to assist in the removal of tree limbs off roadways. At this point the snow started to come down at a heavier rate and the crews could not keep up with the trees that were obstructing roadways. As a result, plows could not get through to clear the snow and the whole region was "stranded in place". Falling tree limbs greatly contributed to the loss of electricity in all municipalities affected. Downed power lines that were charged also prevented people from driving over them (plowing of the streets). Local departments soon became overwhelmed and requested assistance from the town and city disaster co-coordinators. Requests were made to Erie County for assistance and then up to the state level. "On October 13, 2006, New York Governor George Pataki declared a state of emergency for Erie, Niagara, Genesee and Orleans Counties and dispatched State equipment and crews to assist in clearing debris. Local mayors and town supervisors also declared states of emergency in their respective municipalities. The Federal Emergency Management Agency initially issued a temporary disaster declaration allowing for federal assistance, including financial, for local governments, but which did not address or provide for assistance to individual households affected by the Storm."(Szukala). From here the governor declared a state of emergency and eventually received a presidential declaration which declared a federal state of emergency. The Emergency Operations Plan allowed for effective communication between agencies which helped the disaster run in a smoother manner.

== See also ==
- Great Lakes Blizzard of 1977
- Global storm activity of 2006
- November 17–21, 2014 North American winter storm
- Winter storm naming in the United States
