= Blanche, Ontario =

Blanche
- Location of Blanche in Ontario
- Coordinates: 50°04′35″N 85°42′45″W
- Country: Canada
- Province: Ontario
- Region: Northeastern Ontario
- District: Cochrane
- Part: Cochrane, Unorganized, North
- Elevation: 244 m (801 ft)
- Time zone: UTC-5 (Eastern Time Zone)
  - Summer (DST): UTC-4 (Eastern Time Zone)
- Postal code FSA: P0L
- Area codes: 705, 249

Blanche is an unincorporated place and railway point in geographic Selwyn Township in the Unorganized North Part of Cochrane District in northeastern Ontario, Canada.

It is on a now abandoned portion of the Canadian National Railway main line originally constructed as the National Transcontinental Railway transcontinental main line, between the railway points of Ogahalla to the west and Flintdale to the east, 6 kilometres (4 mi) east southeast of where the line crossed the Kenogami River. On a 1913 map, it is named as "Ogaming".

Blanche is also on Ogaming Creek, part of the James Bay drainage basin, which flows via the Flint River, Kenogami River and Albany River to James Bay.
