= Ogahalla, Ontario =

Ogahalla
- Location of Ogahalla in Ontario
- Coordinates: 50°05′41″N 85°50′58″W
- Country: Canada
- Province: Ontario
- Region: Northeastern Ontario
- District: Cochrane
- Part: Cochrane, Unorganized, North
- Elevation: 259 m (850 ft)
- Time zone: UTC-5 (Eastern Time Zone)
  - Summer (DST): UTC-4 (Eastern Time Zone)
- Postal code FSA: P0L
- Area codes: 705, 249

Ogahalla is an unincorporated place and railway point in geographic Barlow Township in the Unorganized North Part of Cochrane District in northeastern Ontario, Canada.

It is on a now abandoned portion of the Canadian National Railway main line originally constructed as the National Transcontinental Railway transcontinental main line, between the railway points of Lynx to the west and Blanche to the east, 4 kilometres (2 mi) west of where the line crossed the Kenogami River. It is also on Ogahalla Creek, part of the James Bay drainage basin, which flows via the Atikasibi River to the Kenogami River.

A now abandoned airfield, created by the Department of National Defence in the mid-1930s in part using 22,632 person-days of unemployment relief labour, lies to the north of the place. A Frontier College instructor was located at the construction camp. The airfield became in the late 1930s part of a string of emergency landing sites for Trans-Canada Air Lines (today Air Canada) to support their transcontinental flight operations.
