= Constance Lake 92 =

- Indian reserve
- Constance Lake Indian Reserve No. 92
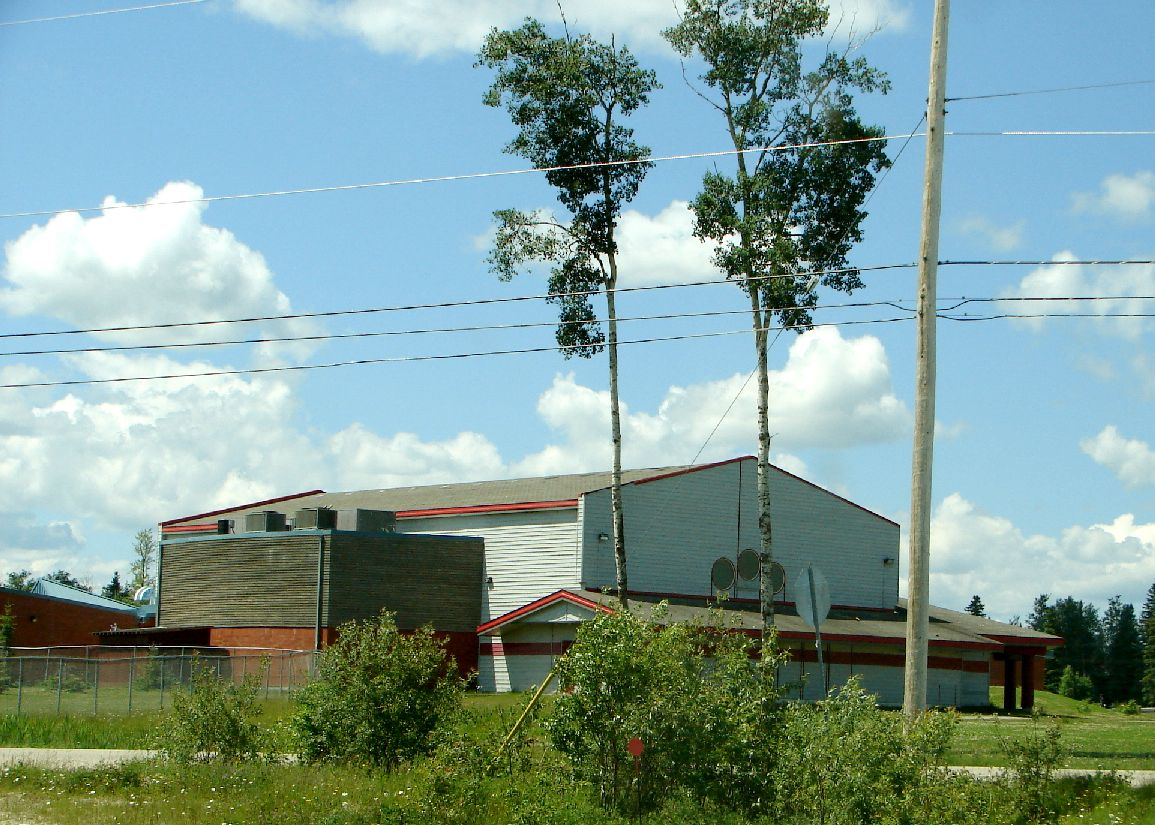

- Location within Ontario
- Coordinates: 49°49′N 84°08′W
- Country: Canada
- Province: Ontario
- District: Cochrane
- First Nation: Constance Lake

Area
  - Land: 26.28 km^{2} (10.15 sq mi)

Population (2016)
  - Total: 590
  - Density: 22.4/km^{2} (58/sq mi)
- Website: www.clfn.on.ca

Constance Lake 92 is a First Nations reserve in Cochrane District, Ontario. It is one of the reserves of the Constance Lake First Nation.
