= Constance Lake First Nation =

Anisininew First Nations band government in Ontario, Canada

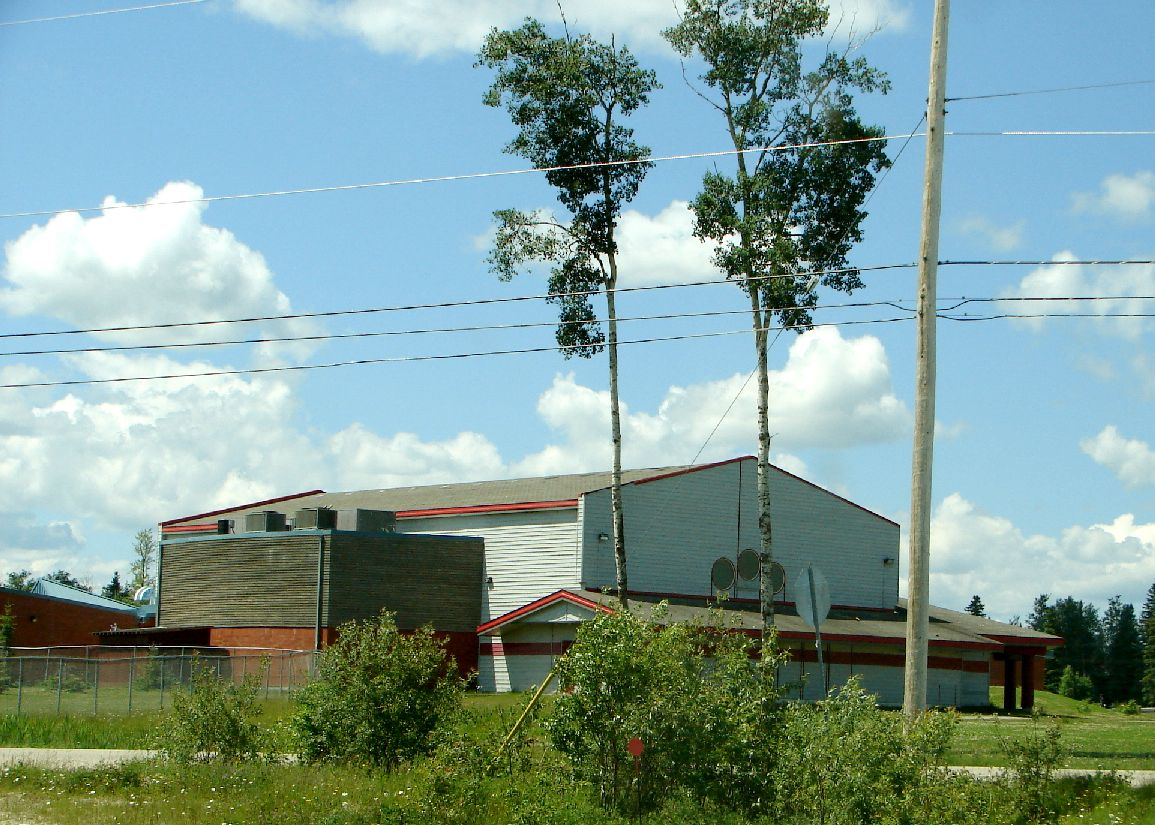
- Constance Lake Community Building

- Location of Constance Lake First Nation in Ontario
- Coordinates: 49°48′18″N 84°08′05″W
- Constance Lake First Nation
- Band No. 182
- People: Anisininew
- Treaty: Treaty 9
- Headquarters: Constance Lake
- Province: Ontario

Land
- Main reserve: Constance Lake 92
- Reserve: English River 66
- Land area: 62.185 km^{2} (24.010 sq mi)

Population (October 2019)
- On reserve: 882
- On other land: 27
- Off reserve: 873
- Total population: 1782

Government
- Chief: Rick Allen
- Council: Wayne Neegan; Samantha John-George; Christine Stephens; Ricky Sutherland

Tribal Council
- Matawa First Nations

Website
- https://constancelakefn.ca/

Constance Lake First Nation (Severn Ojibwa: ᑾᐣᐢᑕᐣᐢ ᓴᑲᐦᐃᑲᐣ) is an Anisininew First Nations band government located on the shores of Constance Lake near Hearst, Cochrane District in northeastern Ontario, Canada. It is directly north of the community of Calstock along a continuation of Ontario Highway 663. Constance Lake First Nation is home to close to 1605 members of Cree and Ojibway with approximately 820 living on reserve. The reserves, Constance Lake 92 and English River 66, total 7,686 acres (3,110 ha) in size.

== History ==
The Constance Lake First Nation members are of:

"Cree, Oji-Cree and Ojibway descent. Our ancestors inhabited the Kenogami, Kabinakagami, Nagagamisis, Nagagami, Pagwachuan, Fushimi, Pledger Lake, Little Current, Drowning, Ridge, Albany, Kabinakagami, Nagagami and Shekak River systems since in time of memorial in the eighteen hundreds and early nineteen hundreds."

Mammamattawa (English River), where the Kenogami River joins with the Kabinakagami and Nagagami Rivers, was the site of Hudson's Bay Company's and rival Revillon Frères' fur trading posts. This area became the Mammamattawa (English River) Reserve which was renamed the Constance Lake First Nation (CLFN).

Constance Lake First Nation were known as the English River Band of Oji-Cree. Prior to Treaty 9, according to a 1901 Canadian census, there were 85 people inhabiting the English River area, 60 miles (97 km) inland from the mouth of the Kenogami or English River. On 27 July 1905, English River Band of Oji-Cree were attached to Treaty 9 as a subdivision of the Fort Albany First Nation on James Bay, and therefore Treaty beneficiaries. The English River band were given their own twelve square miles (31 km^{2}) reserve (English River 66), "[o]n the Kenogami or English River in the Province of Ontario, beginning at a point three miles (4.8 km) below Hudson Bay Post on the North side of the River known as English River then north a portage of three miles (4.8 km) and of sufficient depth to provide one square mile (2.6 km^{2}) for each family of five upon the ascertained population of the band" by Treaty 9 in 1905.

By 1912, Hearst was established with the construction of the National Transcontinental Railway in 1913. Between 1908 and 1912, Hearst became a meeting place for First Nations Peoples engaged in the fur trade. Calstock National Transcontinental Railway's east–west secondary mainline connected Calstock (near Hearst) with Cochrane.

Between 1925 and 1940, many families from English River, Fort Albany, and Moose Factory re-located to Pagwa River to follow employment opportunities. Pagwa, named for the Pagwachuan River, one of the largest rivers in Northern Ontario, was valued by First Nations and the North-West fur traders, as an access route, along with the Albany River, to James Bay and Hudson Bay. Pagwachuan is a Cree word meaning shallow river. Pagwa, a railway divisional point, had a fur trading post, as it was at a major junction of the railway and the Pagwachuan River. Packet steamers ran between Pagwa and James Bay to serve the Revillon Freres trading post and community early in the 1900s. In the 1930s an airfield was built in Pagwa by the Department of National Defence By May 1940, the majority of the English River First Nation resided at Pagwa River as the English River reserve was "uninhabitable", according to Reverend Clarke who had requesting funding for a new school at Pagwa. In 1943 the Department of Indian Affairs began to consider the creation of a new Band for those living at Pagwa.

Inspector Arneil chose Calstock, near Constance Bay, as the most suitable location. On 21 September 1944 the government purchased land for an Indian reserve for the use and benefits of the Constance Bay First Nation, previously known as the Calstock Reserve. Arneil recommended that the Constance Lake First Nation include members of Albany and Moose Factory (Attawapiskat) Bands who also resided at Pagwa. In the 1940s, Constance Lake First Nation "absorbed essentially the whole of the English River Band and also members of the Albany and Moose Factory Bands who lived nearby."

Joan A. Lovisek grouped the Constance Bay First Nations linguistically, with the historical Moose River Cree.

== Governance ==
The First Nation elects its leadership for a two-year term through the Act Electoral System. As of 2021, the leadership is held by chief Ramona Sutherland, together with four (4) councilors: Wayne Neegan, Samantha John-George, Christine Stephen, Ricky Sutherland.

As a signatory to Treaty 9, the First Nation is a member of Matawa First Nations, a Regional Chiefs' Council; the Regional Chiefs' Council, in turn, is a member of the Nishnawbe Aski Nation, a Tribal Political Organization representing many of the First Nations in Northern and Northwestern Ontario.

== Reserves ==
Constance Lake First Nation have two reserves: the 3,110.5-hectare (7,686.2-acre) Constance Lake 92 Indian Reserve and the 3,108-hectare (7,680-acre) English River 66 Indian Reserve, of which Constance Lake 92 serves as the main reserve. The community has existed in this area since the early 1940s, when the reserve was first established.

== Economic development ==
Constance Lake First Nation is one of the nine First Nations in the mineral-rich Northern Ontario Ring of Fire area, a massive planned chromite-mining and smelting development project in the mineral-rich area of the James Bay Lowlands. Tony Clement, Canada's Treasury Board President and the FedNor minister responsible for the Ring of Fire, claimed it will be the economic equivalent of the Athabasca oil sands with a potential of generating $120 billion. Tony Clement described how the Ring of Fire will bring "about a 100 years of mining activity that will spin-off jobs and economic activity for generations." Challenges facing the development of the Ring of Fire mineral include lack of access to the remote region, infrastructure deficits such as roads, railway, electricity and broadband, First Nations' land rights and environmental issues

On 4 February 2013, Tony Clement, acknowledged that the nine first First Nations, on and off-reserve in the Ring of Fire area are some of the "most socioeconomically disadvantaged communities in all of Canada."

Chronic housing shortages, low education outcomes and lack of access to clean drinking water jeopardize the ability of local First Nations to benefit from the significant economic, employment and business development opportunities associated with the Ring of Fire developments.

— Tony Clement Briefings notes 4 February 2013

In an interview with CBC on 27 June 2013, Les Louttit, the deputy grand chief of the Nishnawbe Aski Nation, the group that represents the nine First Nations, argued that serious problems have been neglected for decades. Two to three years is not enough time to for skills training to train locals for construction jobs, for example. Louttit noted the gap in First Nations high school and post-secondary education that's existed for many years. Anja Jeffrey, director of the Centre for the North at the Conference Board of Canada, stressed traditional hunting as one of the key issues while .

Bob Rae was appointed as chief negotiator to represent the nine different native governments, Marten Falls First Nation, Webequie First Nation, Neskantaga First Nation, Nibinamik First Nation, Aroland First Nation, Long Lake 58 First Nation, Ginoogaming First Nation, Fort Hope (Eabametoong) First Nation, Mishkeegogamang First Nation and Constance Lake First Nation, for the Matawa First Nations in talks with the Ontario government about the opening of First Nations lands to the giant Ring of Fire mineral development. Noront's Eagle's Nest copper and nickel mine and the Black Thor chromite mine of Cliffs Natural Resources would generate wealth and royalties for Ontario but the mines are in a remote region. They will "require significant development to make them viable." "[D]evelopment that will have a profound effect on the local native communities, five of which are not yet accessible by road."

In 2002 CLFN through the Northern Boreal Initiative (NBI) began formal planning efforts to document aboriginal traditional knowledge to guide future commercial forestry opportunities. In partnership with the Ontario Ministry of Natural Resources (MNR), they are developing a frame of reference for land use and planning using Community Based Land Use Planning under the authority of the Far North Act. In March 2013 they published a draft entitled, Community Based Land Use Planning.

=== Lecours Lumber Company Ltd. ===
Lecours Lumber Company Ltd. which operates a saw mill located in Calstock on a long-term federal lease, is the main employer of the community. After months of negotiations, on 25 February 2013 Ben Lecours of Lecours Lumber Company Ltd. and Constance Lake First Nation negotiated memorandum of agreements through Regina based mediator, Kenneth Gamble regarding Lecours operations on Constance Lake First Nation. The MOAs cover "employment and training for Constance Lake members, and business opportunities for the First Nation businesses" in addition to the land "lease agreement."

== Services ==
Constance Lake is policed by the Nishnawbe-Aski Police Service, an Aboriginal-based service.

=== Broadband fibre optics ===
By 26 March 2012 Industry Canada's Broadband Canada, the Northwestern Ontario Broadband Expansion Initiative, was already laying 2300 kilometers of fibre optic cable to 26 First Nations across the Far North including the Ring of Fire.

== Education ==
On 10 June 2013 the Constance Lake First Nation, Ontario Works, and Contact North entered into a partnership whereby Contact North "local online learning centre will provide local on-site staff, free local access to educational technology, high-speed Internet, and computer workstations" to access a wide range of "online and distance programs and courses from Ontario's public colleges, universities, school boards, literacy and other training providers," currently available from Ontario's "publicly funded education and training providers." (Note: The Government of Ontario's Contact Nord, established in 1986, a "not-for-profit distance education and training" corporation headquartered in Thunder Bay, serves more than "600 small, rural, remote, Aboriginal and Francophone communities" across Ontario. It partners with "24 public colleges, 22 public universities, over 250 public literacy and basic skills and training providers in Ontario to provide "local access to education and training opportunities.")

Constance Lake First Nation is one of eight First Nation communities along with Aundeck Omni Kaning, M'Chigeeng, Sagamok, Sheguiandah, Sheshegwaning, Whitefish River, and Zhiibaahasing (totalling a member population of 6,800+ people), served by the Anishnaabe controlled and directed Kenjgewin Teg Educational Institute (KTEI), a non-profit incorporated organization. KTEI was formed in April 1994 with the merger of the Wautebek Training Institute and Nda-Gkenjge-Gamig Educational Institute. KTEI provides educational services that "complement First Nation's education delivery in meeting the needs of all learners in school and post-school programs".

== See also ==
- Kenjgewin Teg Educational Institute
