= Kabinakagami River =

- Location of the mouth of the Kabinakagami River in Ontario

Location
- Country: Canada
- Province: Ontario
- Region: Northeastern Ontario
- Districts: Algoma; Cochrane

Physical characteristics
- Source: Summit Lake
  - location: Unorganized North Part, Algoma District
  - elevation: 442 m (1,450 ft)
- Mouth: Kenogami River
  - location: Unorganized North Part, Cochrane District
  - coordinates: 50°24′46″N 84°21′56″W
  - elevation: 86 m (282 ft)

Basin features
- River system: James Bay drainage basin
- Tributaries
  - right: Fox River

The Kabinakagami River is a river in Cochrane and Algoma Districts in northeastern Ontario, Canada. It is part of the James Bay drainage basin and is a right tributary of the Kenogami River.

== Course ==
The river begins at Summit Lake, astride the Canadian Pacific Railway transcontinental main line (used at this point by the Via Rail Sudbury – White River train service) and between the railway points of Amyot to the west and Girdwood to the east, in the Unorganized North Part of Algoma District. It flows northeast to Kabinakagami Lake, then heads north into Cochrane District, flows under Ontario Highway 11, and passes east of Calstock and the Constance Lake First Nation. The rivers turns northwest, then again north, and reaches its mouth at the Kenogami River at the unincorporated place and community of Mammamattawa, site of the now abandoned Hudson's Bay Company English River Post. The Kenogami River flows via the Albany River to James Bay.

== See also ==
- List of rivers of Ontario
