= Calstock, Ontario =

Coordinates: 49°47′30″N 84°8′30″W

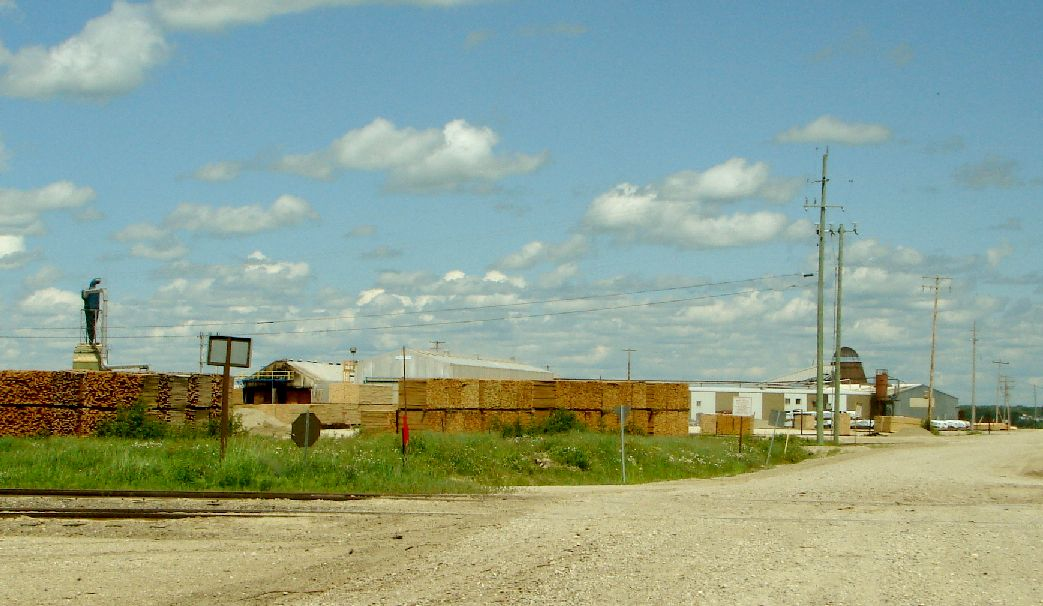
Calstock mill

Calstock is the northwestern terminus of Ontario Northland Railway. in Northern Ontario, Canada, located in the unincorporated geographic township of Studholme in Cochrane District. It is located a few kilometres north of Highway 11, at the northern terminus of Highway 663, just south of the Constance Lake First Nation Reserve and about 30 minutes west (via Highway 11) of Hearst, Ontario.

== Employment ==
Lecours Lumber Company Ltd. operates a sawmill located in Calstock on a long-term federal lease. Lecours is the main employer of the Constance Lake First Nation, with 225 employees at this location. After months of negotiations, on 25 February 2013 Ben Lecours of Lecours Lumber Company Ltd. and Constance Lake First Nation negotiated memorandum of agreements through Regina based mediator Kenneth Gamble regarding Lecours operations on Constance Lake First Nation. The MOAs cover "employment and training for Constance Lake members, and business opportunities for the First Nation businesses" in addition to the land "lease agreement."

The Constance Lake First Nation Reserve is one of the nine First Nations in the mineral-rich Northern Ontario Ring of Fire area, a massive planned chromite mining and smelting development project in the mineral-rich area of the James Bay Lowlands.

The place is counted as part of Cochrane, Unorganized, North Part in Canadian census data.
