= Kenogami River =

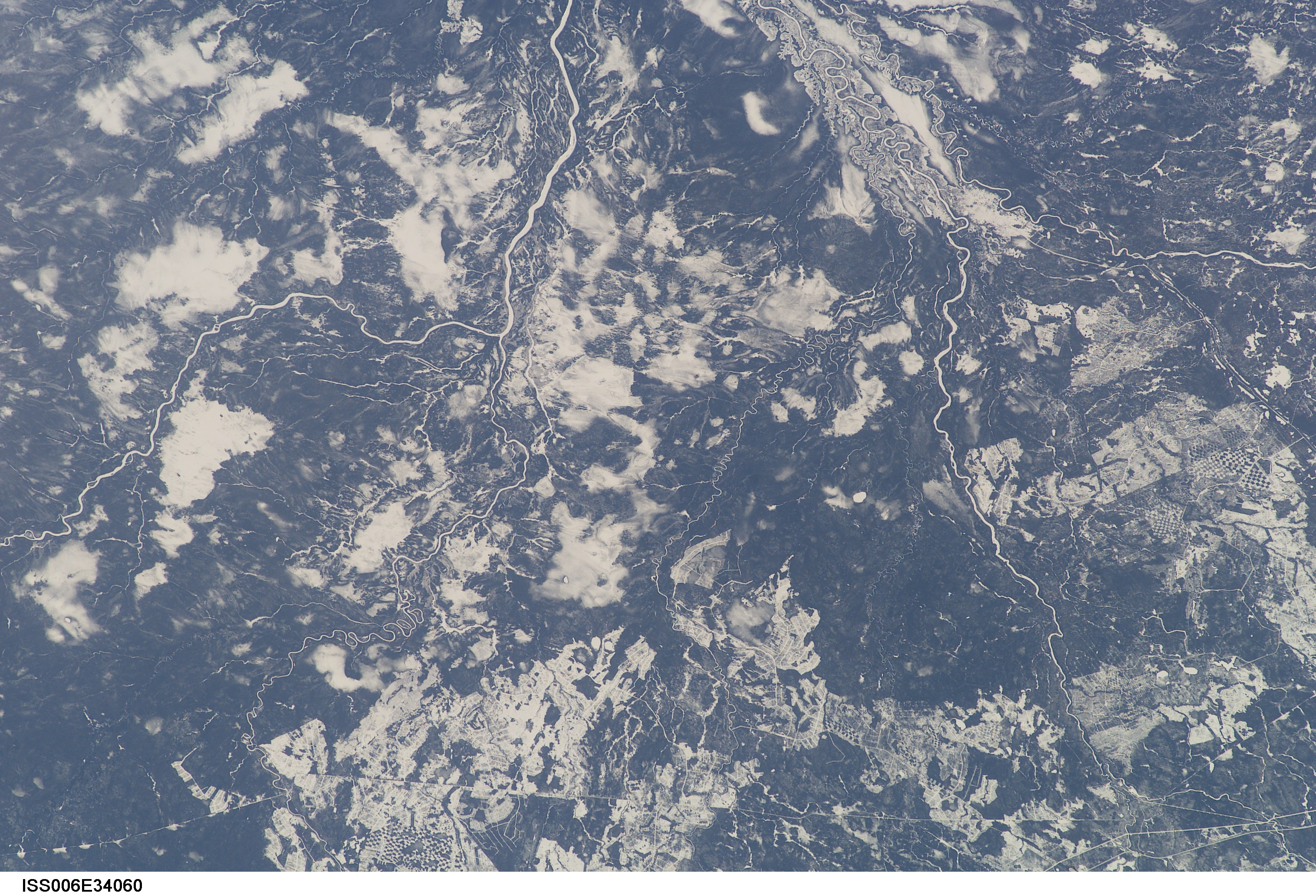
- Kenogami River from the International Space Station (diagonally at upper left corner)

- Location of the mouth of the Kenogami River in Ontario
- Etymology: "long water" in the Cree language

Location
- Country: Canada
- Province: Ontario
- Region: Northern Ontario
- Districts: Thunder Bay; Cochrane

Physical characteristics
- Source: Long Lake
  - location: Longlac, Town of Greenstone, Thunder Bay District
  - elevation: 311 m (1,020 ft)
- Mouth: Albany River
  - coordinates: 51°06′22″N 84°28′54″W
  - elevation: 75 m (246 ft)
- Length: 320 km (200 mi)

Basin features
- River system: James Bay drainage basin
- Tributaries
  - left: Little Current River, Drowning River, Little Drowning River, Kingfisher River, Ash River, Little Ash River, Nemasa River, Watistiguam River, Mundino River, Atikasibi River, Kawakanika River, Burrows River, Kenogamisis River
  - right: Wakashi River, Kabinakagami River, Nagagami River, Pagwachuan River, Flint River, Wabigano River, Fernow River

The Kenogami River is a river in the James Bay drainage basin in Thunder Bay and Cochrane districts in Northern Ontario, Canada, which flows north from Long Lake near Longlac to empty into the Albany River. The river is 320 kilometres (199 mi) in length and its name means "long water" in the Cree language. A portion of the river's headwaters have been diverted into the Lake Superior drainage basin.

== Course ==
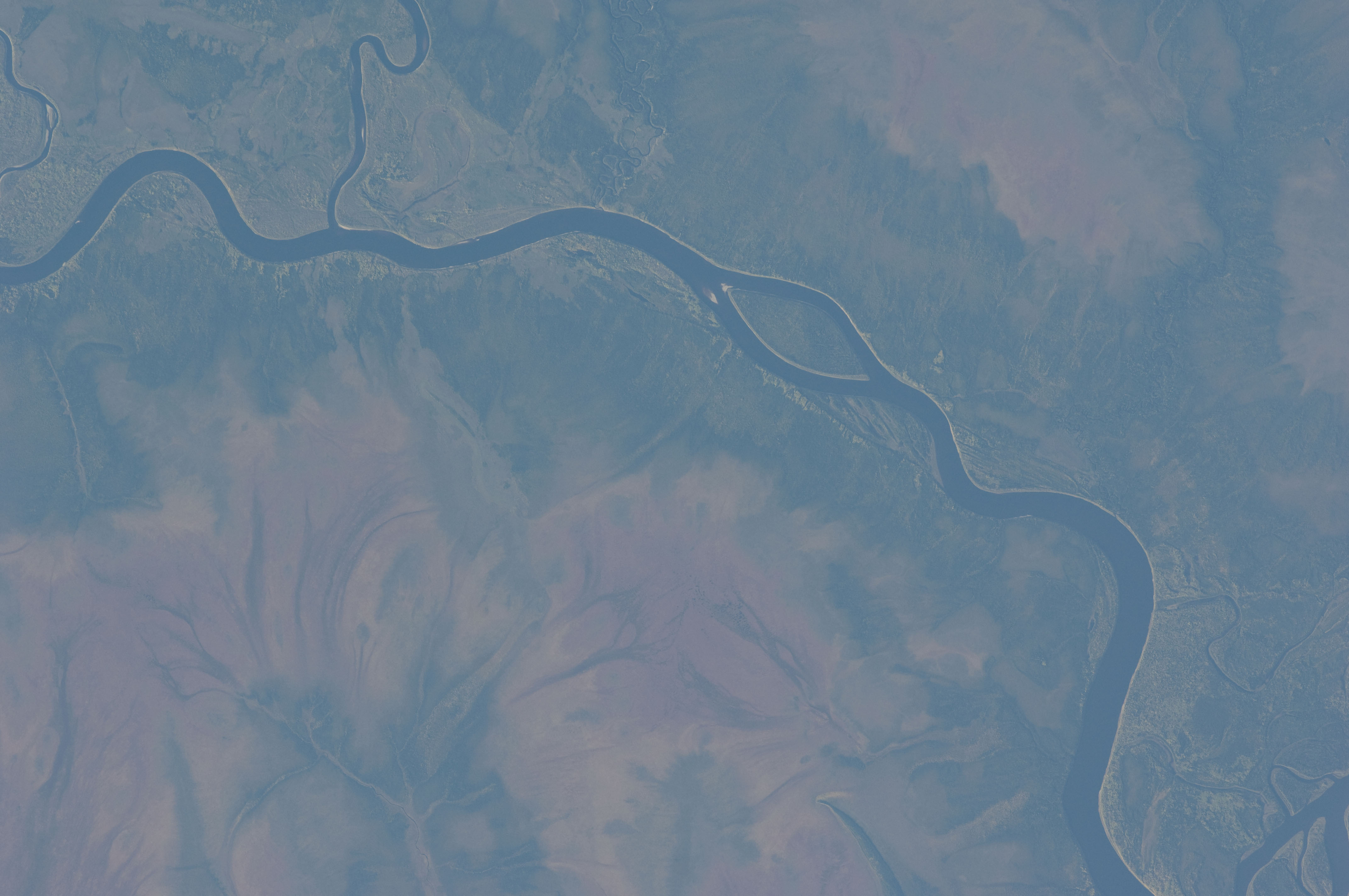
Kenogami with Coltman Island, just before its mouth at the Albany River (north is towards bottom-right)

The river begins at Longlac Bay on Long Lake at the community of Longlac, part of the municipality of Greenstone, Thunder Bay District. It passes under Ontario Highway 11 and the Canadian National Railway (CNR) transcontinental main line (used at this point by Via Rail transcontinental Canadian trains) into geographic Bain Township in Unorganized Thunder Bay District, takes in the left tributaries Kenogamisis River and Burrows River, and reaches the Kenogami Lake Dam.

It continues northeast, takes in the left tributary Kawakanika River, reaches Chipman Lake, passes into Cochrane District at geographic Chipman Township, takes in the right tributaries Fernow River and Wabigano River, heads under a CNR line abandoned in 1986 (originally the National Transcontinental Railway main line) between the railway points Ogahalla to the west and Blanche to the east, and reaches the confluence with the left tributary Atikasibi River.

The river continues northeast, takes in the Mundino River (left), Flint River (right), Watistiguam River (left) and Nemasa River (left), the last at Loon Island, the right tributary Pagwachuan River, and then, within two kilometres, the right tributaries Nagagami River and Kabinakagami River, the latter at the unincorporated place and community of Mammamattawa, site of the abandoned Hudson's Bay Company English River Post trading post.

It turns north, passes the English River 66 First Nations Reserve (part of the Constance Lake First Nation lands), takes in the left tributaries Little Ash River, Ash River and Kingfisher River, the right tributary Wakashi River, the left tributaries Little Drowning River, Drowning River and Little Current River, and reaches its mouth at The Albany Forks on the Albany River, which flows to James Bay.

=== Tributaries ===
- Little Current River (left)
- Drowning River (left)
- Little Drowning River (left)
- Wakashi River (right)
- Kingfisher River (left)
- Ash River (left)
- Little Ash River (left)
- Kabinakagami River (right)
- Nagagami River (right)
- Pagwachuan River (right)
- Nemasa River (left)
- Watistiguam River (left)
- Flint River (right)
- Mundino River (left)
- Atikasibi River (left)
- North Barlow Creek (right)
- Wabigano River (right)
- Fernow River (right)
- Chipman Lake
  - Jobrin Creek (left)
  - Pardee Creek (right)
- Kawakanika River (left)
- Burrows River (left)
- Kenogamisis River (left)
- Blueberry Creek (right)
- Isis Creek (left)

== History ==
The first inland post of the Hudson's Bay Company, named Henley House, was established at the confluence of the Kenogami River and Albany River in 1743. A new post was established in 1884 at Mammamattawa, Ontario at the confluence of the Kenogami River and the Kabinakagami River. It was known as the English River Post, as the Kenogami was also known as the English River.

== Long Lake diversion project ==
In 1937–38, the Hydro-Electric Power Commission of Ontario, now Ontario Power Generation, built the Kenogami Lake Dam (49°55′03″N 86°29′20″W) and Long Lake Diversion Dam to divert this river's headwaters to empty through Long Lake and the Aguasabon River into Lake Superior. The former backed up the headwaters, while the latter controlled the outflow into the Aguasabon River. The diversion has shifted an average flow of 1,377 cubic feet (39.0 m^{3}) per second from a drainage basin of almost 4,400 square kilometres (1,699 sq mi) from James Bay to the Great Lakes Basin. Initially, the diversion supported forestry development and hydroelectric development further downstream on the Great Lakes at Niagara Falls; no hydroelectric development on the watercourses on the diversion project was practical initially. A further stage was completed in 1948 when the Hayes Lake Dam (for water control) and Aguasabon Generating Station (for hydroelectricity), the former just upstream of the latter and the latter just upstream of the mouth of the Aguasabon River at Lake Superior, to support a pulp and paper mill at the adjacent town of Terrace Bay.

== See also ==
- List of rivers of Ontario

== Sources ==
- Map 14 (PDF) (Map). 1 : 1,600,000. Official road map of Ontario. Ministry of Transportation of Ontario. 2010-01-01.
- Restructured municipalities - Ontario map #2 (Map). Restructuring Maps of Ontario. Ontario Ministry of Municipal Affairs and Housing. 2006. Archived from the original on 2012-05-05.
