= Root River (Algoma District) =

- Location of the mouth of the Root River in Ontario

Location
- Country: Canada
- Province: Ontario
- District: Algoma

Physical characteristics
- Source: Upper Island Lake
  - location: Island Lake
  - coordinates: 46°40′10″N 84°15′31″W
  - elevation: 335 m (1,099 ft)
- Mouth: St. Marys River
  - location: Sault Ste. Marie
  - coordinates: 46°32′32″N 84°12′45″W
  - elevation: 181 m (594 ft)

Basin features
- Tributaries
  - left: Crystal Creek, Coldwater Creek
  - right: West Root River

The Root River is a river in Algoma District in northeastern Ontario, Canada. It flows from Upper Island Lake at the community of Island Lake to its mouth at the St. Marys River.

== Course ==
From Upper Island Lake, the river heads south and parallels Ontario Highway 552 to that highway's beginning at Ontario Highway 17 at the community of Heyden, then Highway 17 to the Odena neighbourhood of Sault Ste. Marie. It then heads east and southeast to reach its mouth at the St. Marys River, which forms a small delta called Bells Point.

== Tributaries ==
- Crystal Creek (left)
- Coldwater Creek (left)
- West Root River (right)

== See also ==
- List of rivers of Ontario
