= Island Lake, Algoma District =

Island Lake
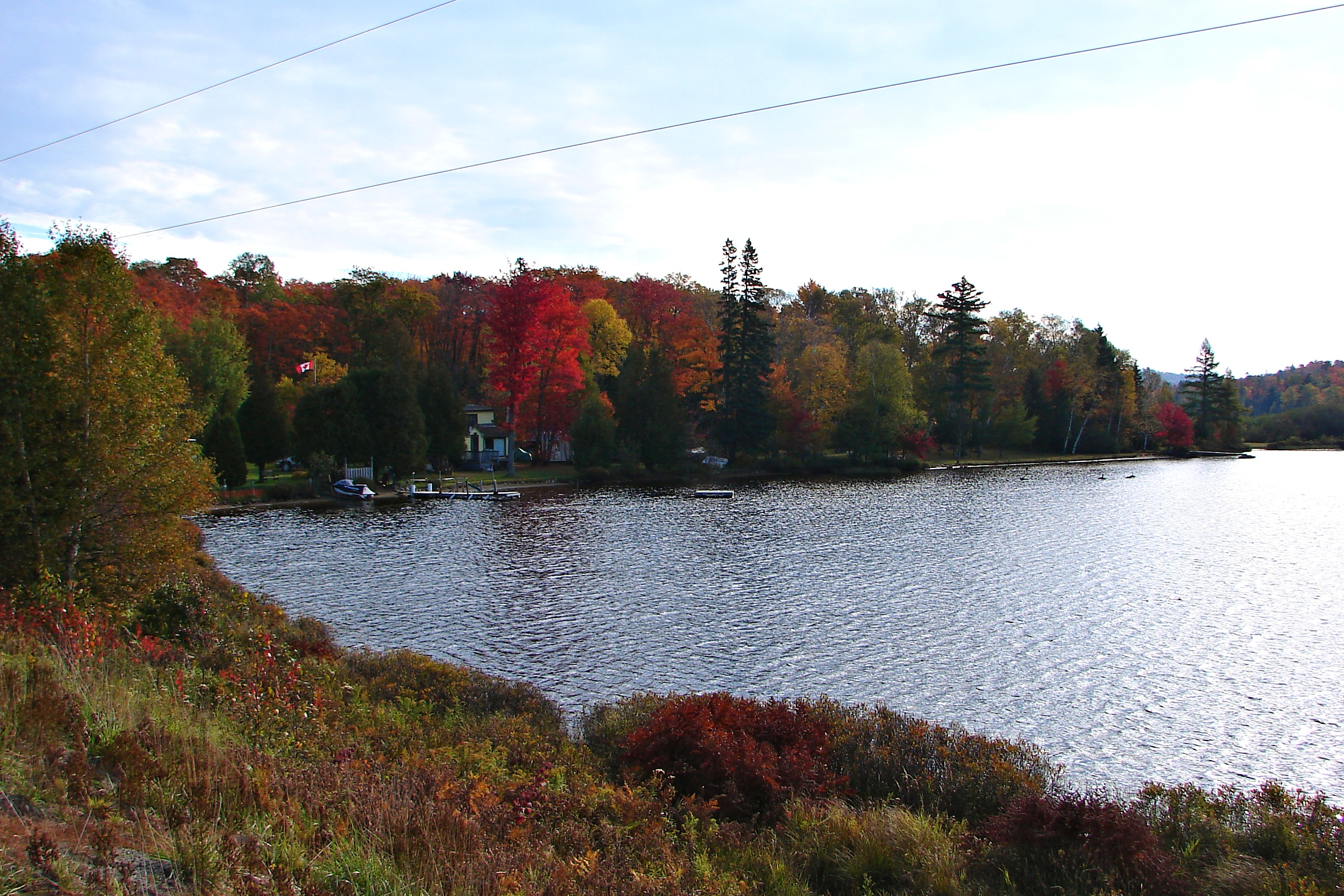
- Lower Island Lake looking northeast

- Location of Island Lake in Ontario
- Coordinates: 46°40′41″N 84°15′51″W
- Country: Canada
- Province: Ontario
- Region: Northeastern Ontario
- District: Algoma
- Municipality: Algoma, Unorganized, North Part
- Elevation: 334 m (1,096 ft)

Population
  - Total: 100 (approx.)
- Time zone: UTC-5 (Eastern Time Zone)
  - Summer (DST): UTC-4 (Eastern Time Zone)
- FSA: P0S
- Area code: 705

Island Lake is a rural settlement in the Unorganized North Part of Algoma District in northeastern Ontario, Canada. It is part of the Aweres local services board and is about 5 kilometres (3 mi) northeast of the community of Heyden, which sits on Ontario Highway 17, and is also 21.1 kilometers (13.1 mi) northeast of Sault Ste. Marie, the district seat. The settlement is at the junction of Ontario Highway 552 and Ontario Highway 556, and the Algoma Central Railway passes through the community. Island Lake was once home to Canadian Military installments—some buildings still remain in the area, however much have been either torn down or completely renovated. Island lake was also once the location of a train station—part of the Algoma Central and Hudson Bay Railway's Main Line.

Island Lake lies on the shores of Upper Island Lake and Lower Island Lake; the Upper Island Lake Dam controls the flow from the former to the latter, and the waters flow via the Root River to the St. Mary's River.

Island Lake—both Upper and Lower, is home to many cottages and private residences; only Lower Island Lake has public beach access and public parking via Ontario Highway 556. Cameron Road, Old Mill Road, Brooks Road, and Arbour Road are all accessible via 556; the names of many area roads originate from last names of families who were the first to purchase land and build property, some of which still remain in the area, hence "Cameron Road" or "Brooks Road".

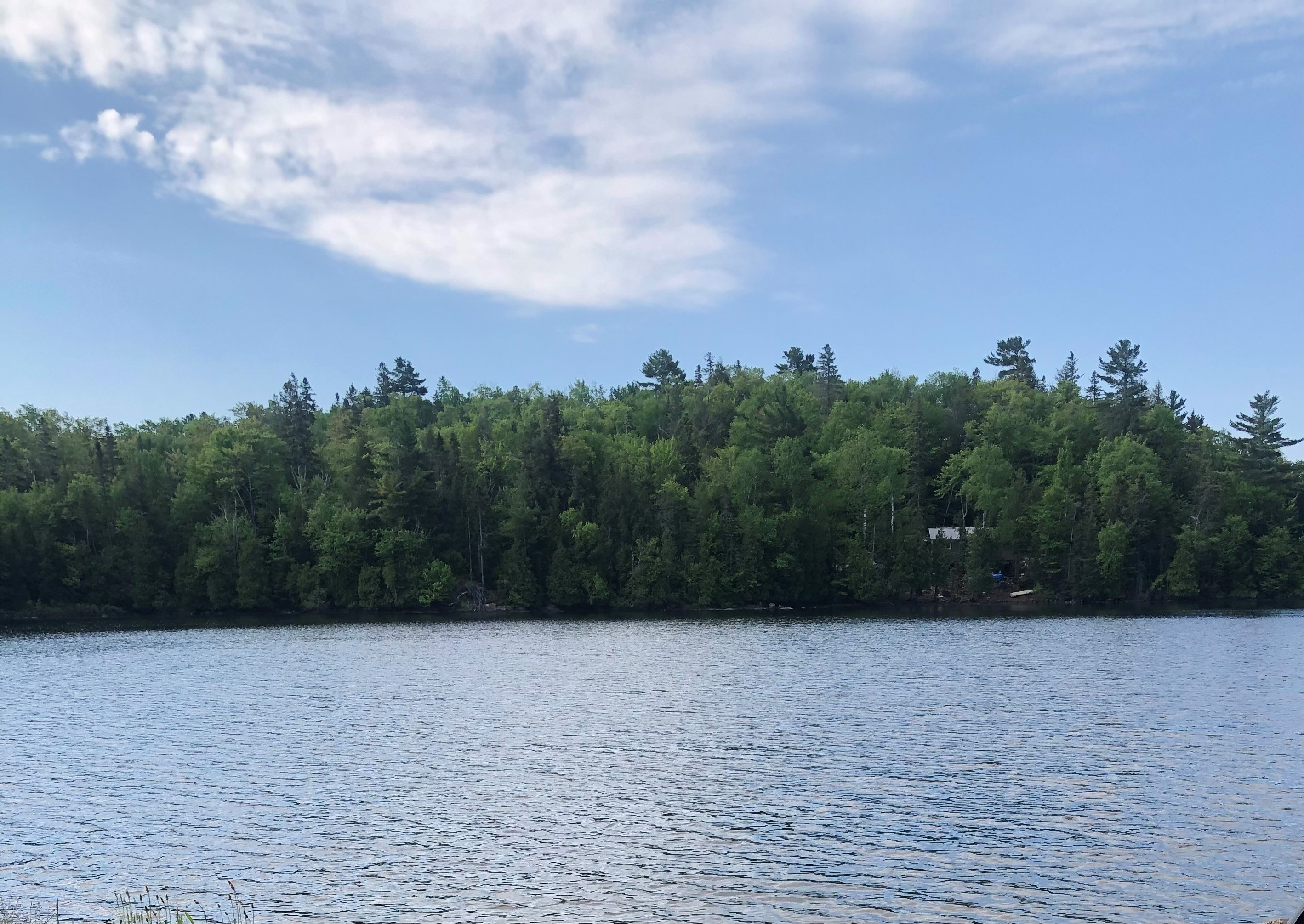
Lower Island Lake looking south

Island Lake and surrounding area is regionally famous for spectacular fall colours due to the abundance of forestry and mountains. Telecommunication services in the area are offered by major Canadian company's such as Bell, Rogers, Telus, and other smaller providers; the area has a volunteer fire service and is regularly patrolled by the Ontario Provincial Police.

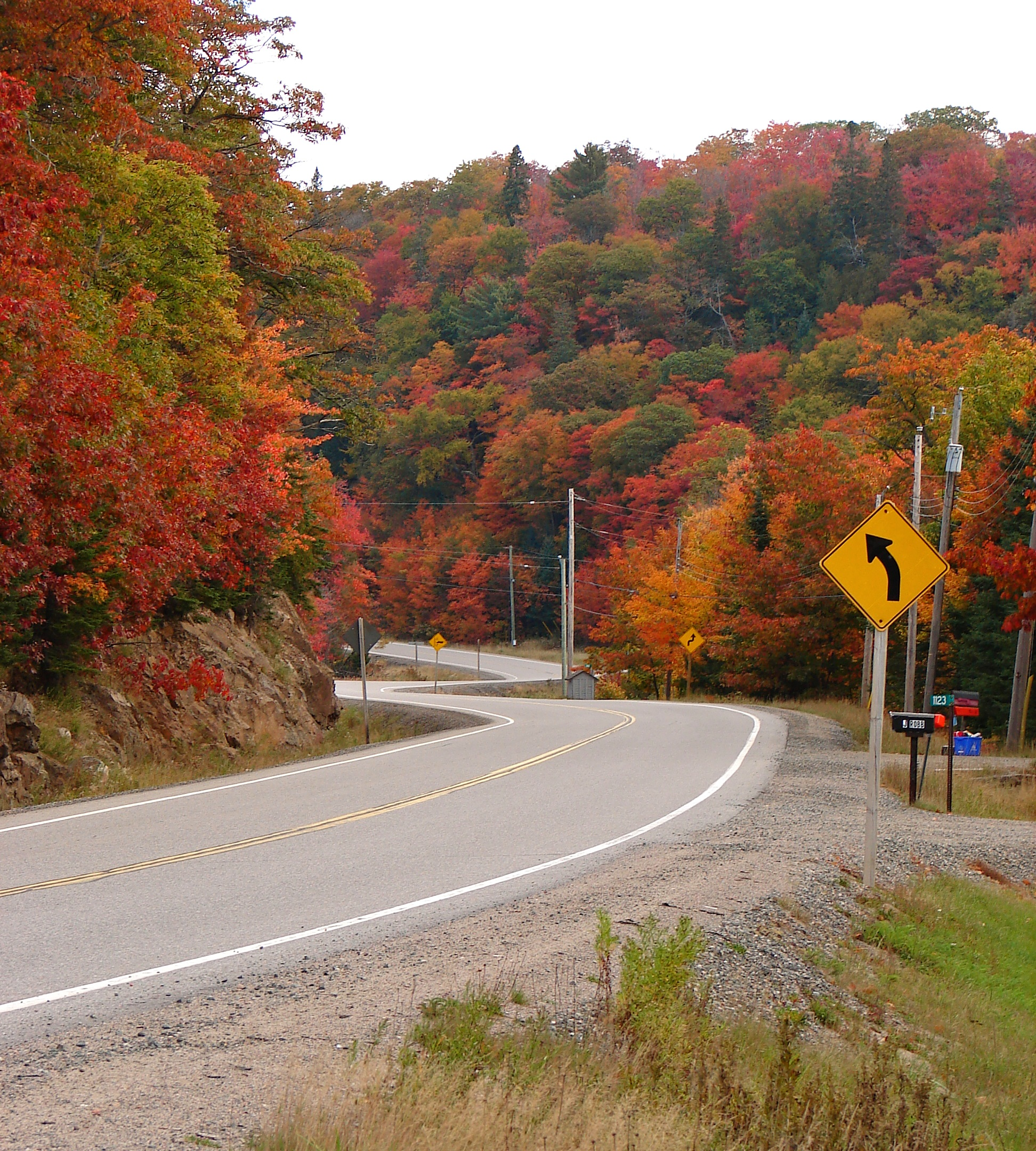
Highway 556 at Island Lake
