= Ontario Highway 532 =

Ontario provincial highway

Highway 532

Route information
- Maintained by Ministry of Transportation of Ontario
- Length: 14.2 km (8.8 mi)
- Existed: 1974–present

Major junctions
- South end: Highway 556 near Glendale
- North end: Christina Mine Road

Location
- Country: Canada
- Province: Ontario
- Districts: Algoma
- Towns: Searchmont
- Villages: Wabos

Highway system
- Ontario provincial highways; Current; Former; 400-series
← Highway 531	→ Highway 533

Secondary Highway 532, commonly referred to as Highway 532, is a provincially maintained secondary highway in the Canadian province of Ontario. The route connects several mining and milling towns in Unorganized Algoma District, notably Searchmont. The route is remote, ending at a mine access road 14.2 kilometres (8.8 mi) north of Highway 556, its southern terminus.

A former designation of Highway 532 travelled through Muskoka along the Parry Sound Colonization Road and was redesignated as Highway 141 in 1974. At that time, the present route was established following what was until then a segment of Highway 556. It has remained unchanged since then.

== Route description ==
The southern terminus of the highway is at Highway 556, 3 kilometres (1.9 mi) south of Searchmont. It is the only highway that passes through the community and connects with the entrance to the Searchmont Resort Ski Area. Just north of the town, the pavement continues as the highway becomes a hilly road with blind corners. The highway passes through the hamlet of Wabos, and approximately 4 kilometres (2.5 mi) to the northeast comes upon a left-hand turn where a sign indicates that "Highway 532 ends". The route is 14.2 kilometres (8.8 mi) long.

== History ==
The current route of Highway 532 was first assumed by the Department of Highways in early 1956, along with several dozen other secondary highways. It was likely maintained as a development road prior to that. It formed the final 14.2 kilometres (8.8 mi) of Highway 556.

The original use of the Highway 532 designation was in southern Ontario. In 1956, this route was designated along the Parry Sound Colonization Road between Highway 69 at Hayes Corners and the former route of Highway 11 at Falkenburg, north of Bracebridge. When the Highway 11 bypass east of Bracebridge was completed and the old route decommissioned in 1958, Highway 532 was extended south through Bracebridge to Muskoka Falls. The route remained this way until January 1, 1973, when the District Municipality of Muskoka was formed. Unlike most other secondary highways in the new municipality, the route was not decommissioned entirely, but rerouted southeast of Raymond. Instead of travelling south through Beatrice, Falkenburg and Bracebrige, the route continued east along what was Highway 516, passing through Utterson and ending at Highway 11.

This new routing was short-lived; in 1974, the entirety of the highway was upgraded to a King's Highway and redesignated Highway 141. Highway 532 assumed its current routing through Algoma that same year, and has remained unchanged since then.

== Major intersections ==
The following table lists the major junctions along Highway 532. The entirety of the route is located within Algoma District.

Location	km	Destinations	Notes
Unorganized Algoma District	0.0	Highway 556 – Heyden, Glendale	
Unorganized Algoma District	14.2	Christina Mine Road	
1.000 mi = 1.609 km; 1.000 km = 0.621 mi
