= Prince Township Wind Farm =

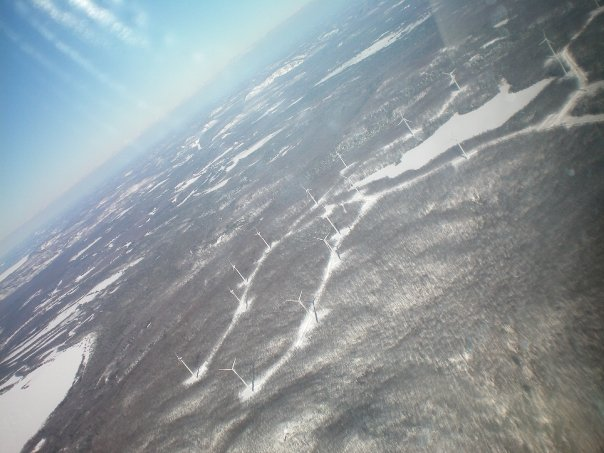
- A portion of the Prince Twp. wind farm
- Country: Canada
- Location: Sault Ste. Marie, Ontario
- Coordinates: 46°37′N 84°28′W
- Status: Operational
- Commission date: September 2006

Power generation
- Nameplate capacity: 189 MW
- Capacity factor: 27.2%

External links
- Commons: Related media on Commons

Prince Wind Farm is a large wind farm in northern Ontario. Prince Wind Farm is owned by Brookfield Power Prince Wind LP, a subsidiary of Brookfield Power. It is located north of Sault Ste. Marie, Ontario, mostly within the township of Prince but also extending into Unorganized Algoma (Dennis and Pennefather Townships), however it is visible from as far away as Pancake Bay Provincial Park and Whitefish Point. Prince I, 99 MW was completed in September 2006, Prince II, 90 MW, in November 2006. The average capacity factor for the first five full years of operation was 27.2%.

== Description ==
Prince Wind Farm has a footprint of 300 hectares and the total area is over 10,000 hectares.

Main components of the Prince Wind farm:

- 126 GE SLE 1.5 MW wind turbines
- 90 kilometers of underground collector cables.
- 11.2 kilometers of above ground transmission line
- two electrical substations that step-up the voltage for the grid to 230 kV (Prince 1 TS, Prince 2 TS).
- One Switching Station (Heyden SS), for interconnection into the Great Lake Power Transmission system.
- 50 kilometers of access roads.
- Meteorological towers, used for weather data acquisition. Unlike modern wind farms in Ontario, Prince Wind Farm does not provide met data to the Independent Electricity System Operator(IESO) from its met towers.
- An operations and maintenance building located in west Sault Ste. Marie.

Prince Wind Farm has secured 30 land owner agreements with private land owners and 20 turbines are located on crown land.

== Development ==
Early development for Prince Wind Farm began in 2000, when Brookfield started the environmental assessment process, wind data collection and lease negotiations. Prince Wind Farm was the first wind farm that Brookfield Renewable Power developed and constructed.

Phase I construction begun in September 2005 and achieved commercial operation on September 21, 2006. Phase II begun in January 2006 and achieved commercial operation on November 19, 2006.

Prince Township Monthly Production (MWh)
Year	January	February	March	April	May	June	July	August	September	October	November	December	Total
2006								1402	10956	24475	32814	45702	115359
2007	38443	43510	56011	34429	35000	21735	16912	31901	48743	53416	50123	48091	478314
2008	46109	30310	41186	46696	41942	28576	21684	22265	34196	54202	40355	48562	456083
2009	28224	37036	48543	50827	48263	21134	21642	26173	22301	42682	45477	40280	432582
2010	38752	27300	36617	41417	35761	25573	21275	31225	50264	43219	59399	43632	454434
2011	31143	43163	39289	42681	34914	35940	18450	20072	35044	45636	42192	44710	433234
2012	57502	40438	57594	40477	36144	28053	15216						

== See also ==
- List of offshore wind farms
