= Unorganized North Algoma District =

- Unorganized area
- Algoma, Unorganized, North Part
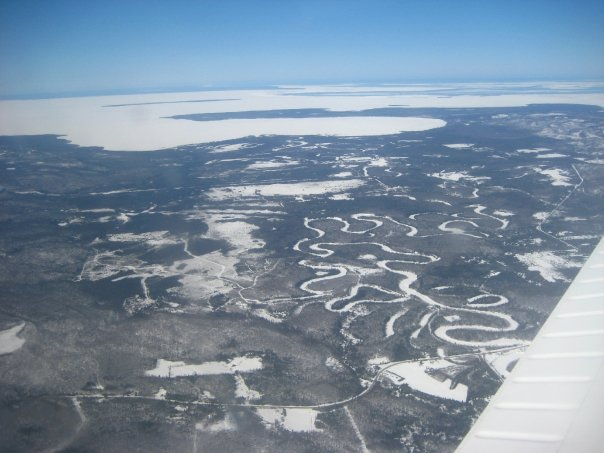
- An aerial view of Goulais River.

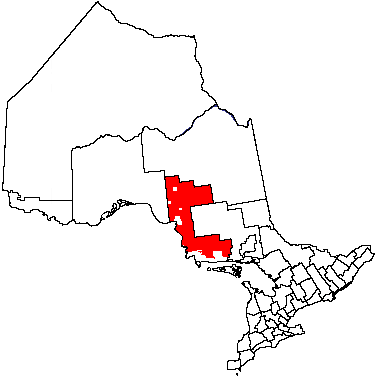
- Coordinates: 47°30′N 84°15′W
- Country: Canada
- Province: Ontario
- District: Algoma

Government
  - MPs: Gaétan Malette (Conservative); Terry Sheehan (Liberal)
  - MPP: Bill Rosenberg (PC)

Area
  - Land: 43,618.95 km^{2} (16,841.37 sq mi)

Population (2021)
  - Total: 6,050
  - Density: 0.1/km^{2} (0.26/sq mi)
- Time zone: UTC-5 (EST)
  - Summer (DST): UTC-4 (EDT)
- Postal code span: P0L, P0M, P0R
- Area code: 705

Unorganized North Algoma District is an unorganized area in northeastern Ontario, Canada, comprising all areas in Algoma District, north of the Sault Ste. Marie to Elliot Lake corridor, which are not part of an incorporated municipality or a First Nation. It covers 43,618.95 km^{2} (16,841.37 sq mi) of land, and had a population of 6,050 in 2021. Many of these communities were/are stations on the Algoma Central Railway or were logging/mining towns.

== Local services boards ==
- Aweres (includes Heyden and Island Lake)
- Batchawana Bay
- Goulais and District (includes Bellevue, Bourdage Corner, Goulais Bay, Goulais River, Karalash Corners, Kirby's Corner and Sand Bay)
- Hawk Junction
- Missanabie
- Peace Tree
- Searchmont (includes Glendale, Northland and Wabos)
- Wharncliffe and Kynoch (includes Kynoch and Wharncliffe)

== Communities ==
=== Dalton ===
Dalton is an abandoned village in the middle of Highway 651 about 27 km or 30 minutes from Missanabie. There is a small train station and some old buildings that serve as summer cottages. The railroad passes through the little town that has some trails to get to the nearby lakes such as Ogasiwi lake.

=== Dunns Valley ===
Dunns Valley is located 30 km north of Bruce Mines at the end of Highway 670.

=== Franz ===
Franz (48°28′N 84°25′W) is located at the junction of the Canadian Pacific and Algoma Central Railways near Hobon Lake, 209 kilometres (130 mi) north of Sault Ste. Marie and 65 kilometres (40 mi) from Chapleau. Franz once had a booming economy in forestry, transportation and mining. The community's original name was Hobon. In 1914, the post office's name was changed to Franz, and the railway station was renamed from Hobon to Franz Station after former Algoma Steel executive William Charles Franz. The station closed in 1991 and the building was moved to Dubreuilville, where it serves as a library and tourist office. Today, Franz is little more than a forgotten ghost town, with many memories of the past either in complete disrepair or torn down.

=== Frater ===
Frater is an uninhabited dispersed rural community and unincorporated place with a railway siding on the Algoma Central Railway located 91 kilometres (57 mi) north of Sault Ste. Marie. It is located on Frater Lake at the boundary with Lake Superior Provincial Park, 3.5 kilometres (2.2 mi) from the Ontario Highway 17 (Trans-Canada Highway) and 4.3 kilometres (2.7 mi) from the shore of Lake Superior, and at geographic coordinates 47°20′12″N 84°33′02″W.

=== Goudreau ===
Goudreau (48.250°N 84.533°W) was built as a stopping point along the Algoma Central Railway.

When the Cline mine opened, Goudreau sprang to life with some 200 residents coming to the area to work. Not all of the residents worked in the mine; some of them were prospectors in search of the gold, silver, copper and iron pyrite. During the First World War, the mine was leased to the Nichols Chemicals company for the production of sulphuric acid. After the war ended, the market fell and the mine ceased operations. Other mines soon set up operations in the area. They went by the names of The Emily, Algold, Algoma Summit and The Edward. Each mine had a town site for their employees.

The town continued to grow, with the building of a two-storey railway station, workers homes and a movie theatre. A post office was built in 1915 and closed in 1966.

The Second World War ultimately led to Goudreau's demise as the demand for gold came second to iron and steel for the war. The mines eventually closed down as costs increased. Located along Highway 519, Goudreau is now a virtual ghost town, still used for logging operations and summer homes.

=== Harmony Beach ===
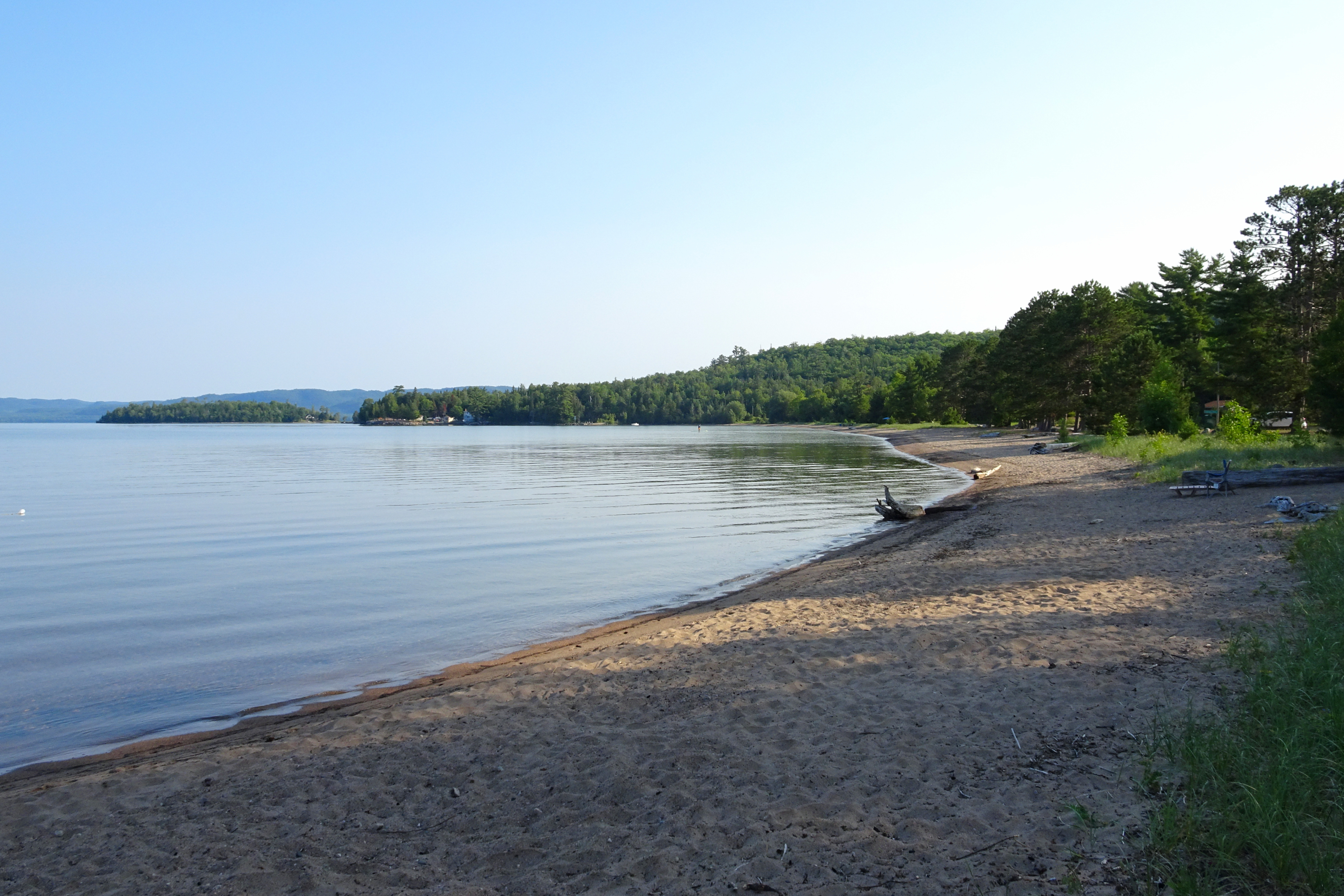
Harmony Bay

Harmony Beach is a small community built around a beach on Lake Superior.

=== Havilland Bay ===
Havilland Bay is a small unincorporated community built around a beach on Lake Superior.

=== Island Lake ===
Island Lake (46.6711° N 84.2687°W) is a rural settlement in the Unorganized North Part of Algoma District in northeastern Ontario, Canada. It is part of the Aweres local services board and is about 5 kilometres (3 mi) northeast of the community of Heyden, which sits on Ontario Highway 17, and is also 21.1 kilometers (13.1 mi) northeast of Sault Ste. Marie, the district seat. The settlement is at the junction of Ontario Highway 552 and Ontario Highway 556, and the Algoma Central Railway passes through the community. Island Lake was once home to Canadian Military installments—some buildings still remain in the area, however much have been either torn down or completely renovated. Island lake was also once the location of a train station—part of the Algoma Central and Hudson Bay Railway's Main Line.

To see the full—main article, click below.

=== Leeburn ===
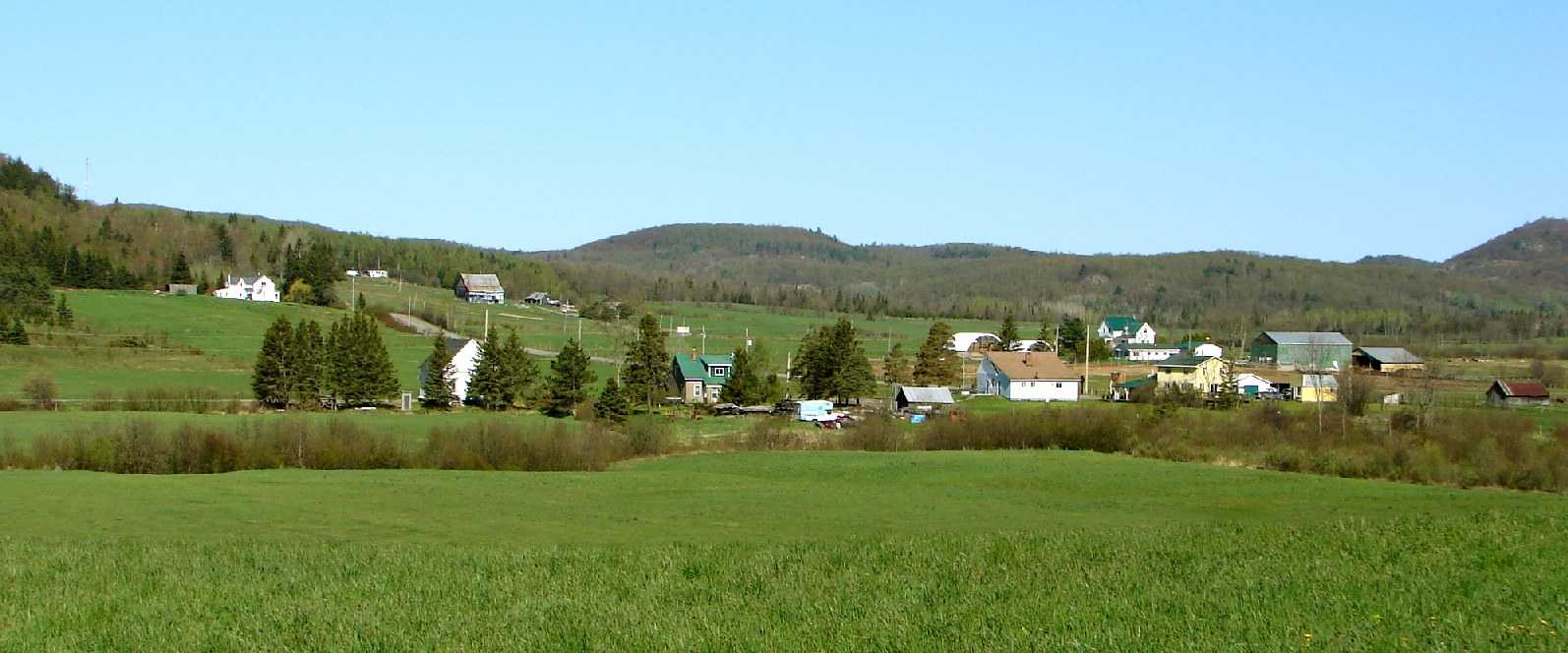
Leeburn

Leeburn (46°28′00″N 83°48′52″W) is located along Highway 638. At one time there was a gold mine at Bass Lake, a few kilometres north of Leeburn. The quality of the ore found was not sufficient to make the mine profitable.

=== Lochalsh ===
Lochalsh (48°21′00″N 84°16′00″W) is a ghost town and rail siding located at the very south end of Wabatongushi Lake, along the Canadian Pacific Railway between Missanabie and Franz. A taxi ran between Lochalsh, Goudreau, and the Cline Mine. When the mine closed in 1946, both towns became ghost towns. There are still active mining operations in the area as well as a few ghost mines. The area around Lochalsh has a population of one.

=== Montreal River ===
Montreal River or Montreal River Harbour (47°14′25″N 84°38′45″W) is a very small community located at the mouth of the Montreal River just south of Lake Superior Provincial Park. Immediately north of the community, the Montreal River Hill is one of the more famous segments of Ontario Highway 17, simultaneously recognized for both its scenic vistas of the surrounding wilderness and its potential to create a bottleneck in the Trans-Canada Highway system because winter storms can render it impassable.

=== Northland Lake ===
The community of Northland Lake (46°42′29″N 84°7′20″W) is located near Highway 556 and found by following the Northland Lake Road that intersects it . The community is mostly a collection of summer cottages. The Algoma Central Railway also operated a train station in the community by the name of Northland Station. The building still stands to this day but has been converted to a private cottage.

=== Oba ===
Oba (49°03′33″N 84°06′14″W) is a dispersed rural community located at the junction of the Canadian National and the Algoma Central Railways, approximately halfway between Dubreuilville and Hearst, and is a stop for Via Rail's Canadian. Oba is 100.92 km^{2} (38.97 mi^{2}) and its population in 2021 was 5, a 66.7% decrease from 2016; 2 out of the 21 dwellings are occupied. The community is accessible by forest roads extending from Highway 583, by train, or by boat; the community is popular with fishers and hunters due to the abundance of forestry and streams or lakes in the area and is the location of a remote Ministry of Northern Development, Mines, Natural Resources, and Forestry office.

=== Ophir ===
Ophir (46°27′48″N 83°43′44″W) is a sparsely populated farming community located 25 km north of Bruce Mines. It is centred at the intersection of the east–west and north–south portions of Highway 638.

Non-native settlers began farming in the area around the time the mines of Bruce Mines closed in 1875. In November, 1889, William Moor, a farmer prospecting after the fall harvest, found ore containing gold atop a ridge overlooking what was then Lake Ickta (now Havilah Lake). After some ownership dispute, American investors organized the Ophir Gold Mining Company (named after the biblical Ophir) to purchase the land in 1892. A small mining town was built, and gold mining operations commenced in 1893, producing 2489 tons of ore worth $8459. Operations ceased due to a financial panic in the United States and a fatal mining accident. The name of the mine and lake were changed to Havilah, another biblical reference, as mining resumed from 1910 to 1911, but the operation and its buildings were subsequently abandoned. Ophir and area are still home to abandoned mine shafts and buildings; however, much are on private property and have not been maintained in decade. The area has also been referred to as 'Mcphee's Valley', an ode to a former family who settled in the community. Ophir has a volunteer fire department and area roads are patrolled by the OPP; major government services are delivered either 25 km south, via Highway 638, in Bruce Mines, or 59 km to the east via 638 & Highway 17, in Sault Ste. Marie.

Ophir was the birthplace of the late Dr. James McPhee, a veteran of World War II who was shot down from the sky in Germany, he was imprisoned in a German war camp near Auschwitz, and later escaped—he would ultimately help found the Mackenzie Richmond Hill Hospital, where he was chief of staff. McPhee would later serve as president of the Ontario College of Family Physicians in 1970–71, he closed his family practice in 1992 but worked as a surgical assistant until he was 84. McPhee died in 2019, at the age of 94, in Barrie, at the Royal Victoria Hospital.

=== Poplar Dale ===
North of Ophir, this region was settled in the late 19th century for primarily agricultural reasons. The community comprises all peoples living along the Thessalon River and its tributaries. The community's major exports are beef and timber; Poplar Dale is home to the annual Northern Vibe Festival, a cannabis related festival consisting of music, art, and cannabis related festivities.

=== Ranger Lake ===
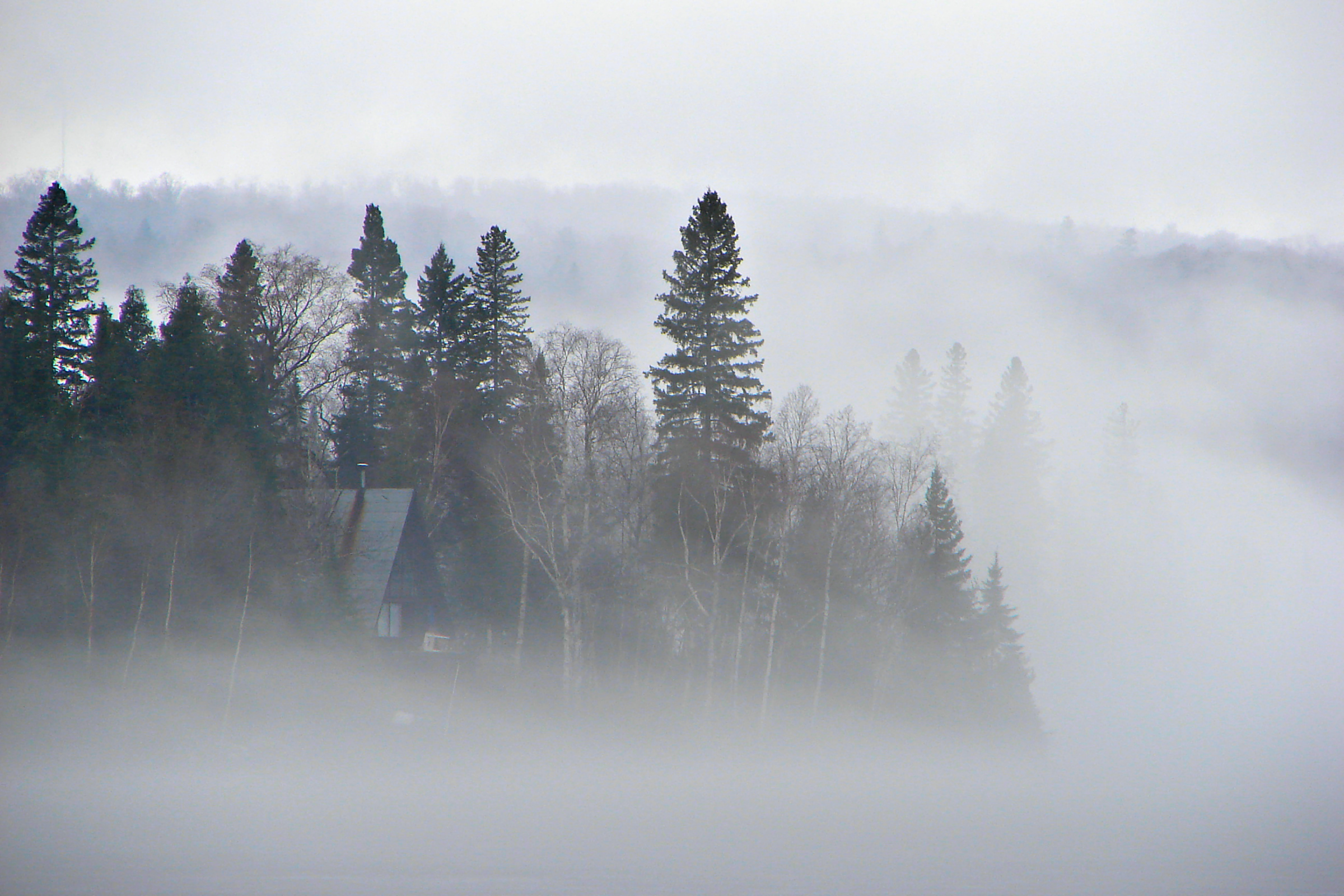
Ranger Lake

The community of Ranger Lake (46°52′25″N 83°34′50″W) is located along Highway 556 at the south end of the lake with the same name. It is mostly a collection of summer cottages and resorts. There is an old fire tower.

=== Wabos ===
Wabos (46°49′00″N 84°06′55″W) is a railway siding along the Algoma Central Railway located approximately 8.6 kilometres (5.3 mi) north-west of Searchmont.

== Demographics ==
Canada census – Algoma, Unorganized, North Part community profile

	2021	2016	2011
Population	6,050 (+5.4% from 2016)	5,739 (+3.9% from 2011)	5,518 (-3.5% from 2006)
Land area	43,618.95 km^{2} (16,841.37 sq mi)	44,077.03 km^{2} (17,018.24 sq mi)	44,077.03 km^{2} (17,018.24 sq mi)
Population density	0.1/km^{2} (0.26/sq mi)	0.1/km^{2} (0.26/sq mi)	0.1/km^{2} (0.26/sq mi)
Median age	54.4 (M: 54.8, F: 53.6)	52.5 (M: 52.6, F: 52.3)
Private dwellings	5,019 (total) 2,773 (occupied)	5,489 (total)	5,118 (total)
Median household income	$76,500	$61,277

References: 2021 2016 2011

Historical census populations – Algoma, Unorganized, North Part

Year	Pop.	±%
1991	7,450	—
1996	7,383	−0.9%
2001	6,114	−17.2%
2006	5,717	−6.5%

Year	Pop.	±%
2011	5,518	−3.5%
2016	5,739	+4.0%
2021	6,050	+5.4%

Population counts are not adjusted for boundary changes.
Source: Statistics Canada

Visible minority and Aboriginal population (Canada 2006 Census)
Population group		Population	% of total population
White		5,045	88.1%
Visible minority group Source:	South Asian	0	0%
Visible minority group Source:	Chinese	0	0%
Visible minority group Source:	Black	10	0.2%
Visible minority group Source:	Filipino	75	1.3%
Visible minority group Source:	Latin American	10	0.2%
Visible minority group Source:	Arab	0	0%
Visible minority group Source:	Southeast Asian	0	0%
Visible minority group Source:	West Asian	0	0%
Visible minority group Source:	Korean	0	0%
Visible minority group Source:	Japanese	0	0%
Visible minority group Source:	Visible minority, n.i.e.	0	0%
Visible minority group Source:	Multiple visible minority	0	0%
Total visible minority population		95	1.7%
Aboriginal group Source:	First Nations	285	5%
Aboriginal group Source:	Métis	290	5.1%
Aboriginal group Source:	Inuit	0	0%
Aboriginal group Source:	Aboriginal, n.i.e.	10	0.2%
Aboriginal group Source:	Multiple Aboriginal identity	0	0%
Total Aboriginal population		585	10.2%
Total population		5,725	100%

== See also ==
- List of townships in Ontario
