= Prince, Ontario =

Prince
- Township (single-tier)
- Township of Prince
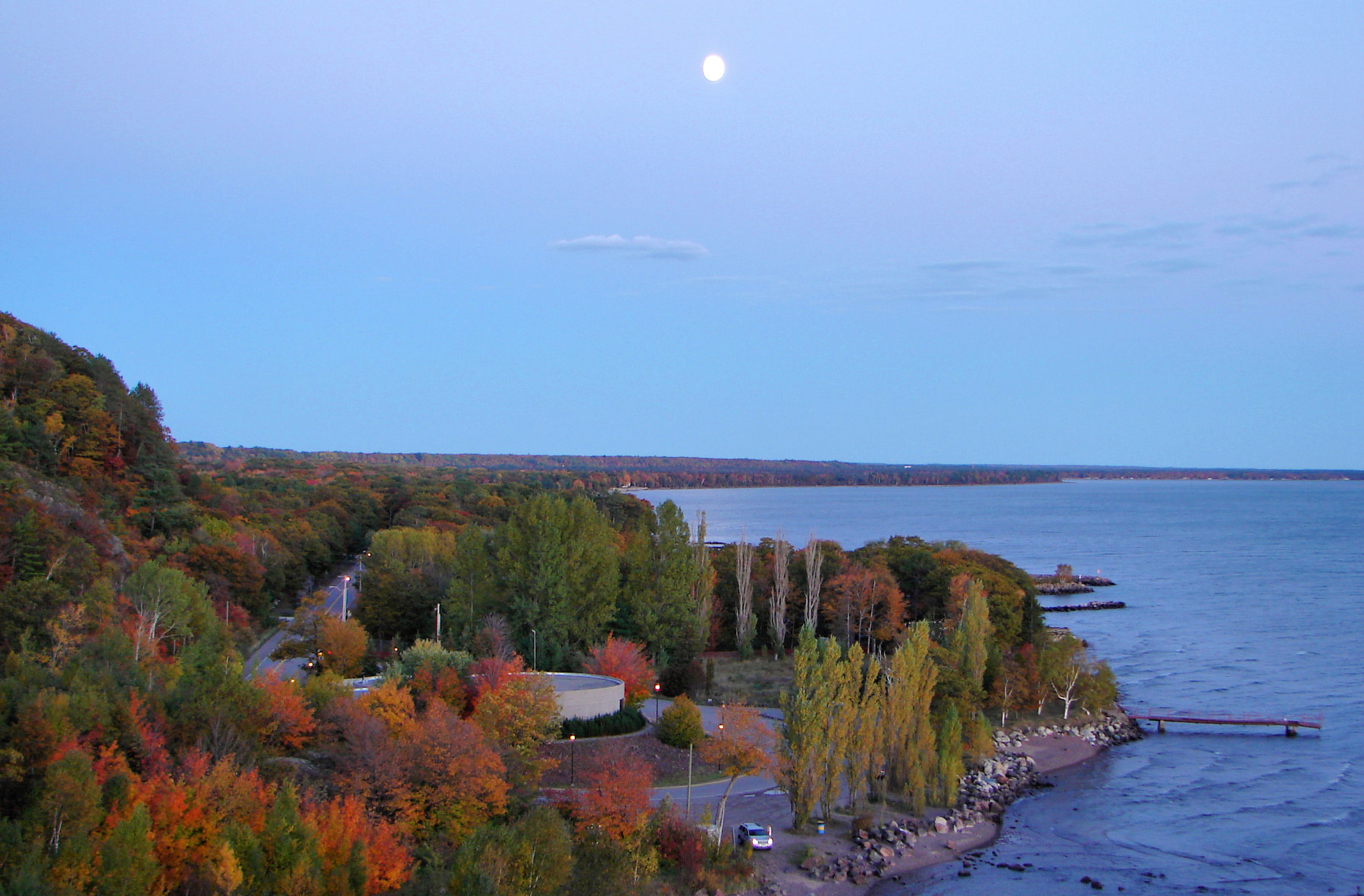
- The end of Highway 550 in Gros Cap.

- Location within Ontario
- Coordinates: 46°32′N 84°30′W
- Country: Canada
- Province: Ontario
- District: Algoma

Government
  - Type: Township
  - Major: Melanie Mageran
  - MP: Terry Sheehan (Liberal)
  - MPP: Bill Rosenberg (PC)

Area
  - Land: 84.98 km^{2} (32.81 sq mi)

Population (2021)
  - Total: 975
  - Density: 11.5/km^{2} (30/sq mi)
- Time zone: UTC-5 (EST)
  - Summer (DST): UTC-4 (EDT)
- Postal code span: P6A
- Area codes: 705, 249
- Website: www.princetownship.ca

Prince is a township in the Canadian province of Ontario, located within the Algoma District northwest of Sault Ste. Marie. The only named community within the township is Gros Cap.

Although the township is not part of the city of Sault Ste. Marie, some municipal services are contracted to the city. Most mail and telephone services in the township are part of Sault Ste. Marie's sortation area and telephone exchange. Prince Lake is naturally spring fed.

One of the largest wind farms in Canada, the Prince Township Wind Farm, is located in Prince Township. It provides enough electricity to serve 20,000 homes. The project is run by Brascan Power Wind.

The township was named after John Prince, the first judge in the Algoma District.

== Demographics ==
In the 2021 Census of Population conducted by Statistics Canada, Prince had a population of 975 living in 394 of its 462 total private dwellings, a change of −3.5% from its 2016 population of 1,010. With a land area of 84.98 km^{2} (32.81 sq mi), it had a population density of 11.5/km^{2} (29.7/sq mi) in 2021.

Canada census – Prince community profile

	2021	2016	2011
Population	975 (-3.5% from 2016)	1,010 (-2.0% from 2011)	1,031 (6.2% from 2006)
Land area	84.98 km^{2} (32.81 sq mi)	85.30 km^{2} (32.93 sq mi)	85.31 km^{2} (32.94 sq mi)
Population density	11.5/km^{2} (30/sq mi)	11.8/km^{2} (31/sq mi)	12.1/km^{2} (31/sq mi)
Median age	51.2 (M: 50.8, F: 51.2)	48.1 (M: 48.6, F: 47.6)
Private dwellings	462 (total) 394 (occupied)	459 (total)	466 (total)
Median household income	$116,000

References: 2021 2016 2011

Historical census populations – Prince, Ontario

Year	Pop.	±%
1901	207	—
1911	213	+2.9%
1921	183	−14.1%
1931	262	+43.2%
1941	214	−18.3%
1951	287	+34.1%
1956	393	+36.9%

Year	Pop.	±%
1961	597	+51.9%
1966	587	−1.7%
1971	666	+13.5%
1976	718	+7.8%
1981	766	+6.7%
1986	798	+4.2%
1991	987	+23.7%

Year	Pop.	±%
1996	971	−1.6%
2001	1,010	+4.0%
2006	971	−3.9%
2011	1,031	+6.2%
2016	1,010	−2.0%
2021	975	−3.5%

Population counts are not adjusted for boundary changes.
Source: Statistics Canada

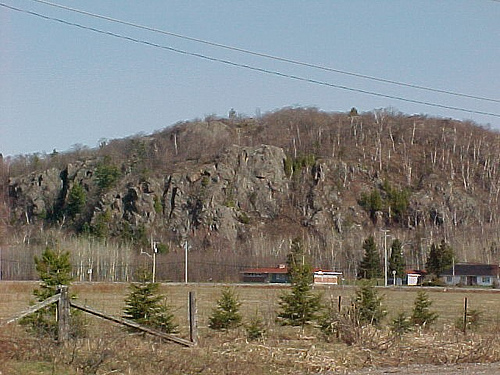
Canadian Shield outcropping in Prince Township

== See also ==
- List of townships in Ontario
