= Ontario Highway 108 =

Ontario provincial highway

Highway 108
- Highway 108 highlighted in red

Route information
- Maintained by the Ministry of Transportation of Ontario
- Length: 41.6 km (25.8 mi)
- Existed: December 19, 1957–present
- Tourist routes: Deer Trail

Major junctions
- South end: Highway 17 in Serpent River
- North end: Highway 639 north of Elliot Lake

Location
- Country: Canada
- Province: Ontario

Highway system
- Ontario provincial highways; Current; Former; 400-series
← Highway 105	→ Highway 112
Former provincial highways
← Highway 107	Highway 109 →

King's Highway 108, commonly referred to as Highway 108, is a provincially maintained highway in the Canadian province of Ontario. Located in the Algoma District, the highway extends for 41.6 kilometres (25.8 mi) from an intersection with Highway 17 west of Serpent River, through the urban core of Elliot Lake, to an intersection with Quirke Mine Road in the north end of the city. The highway continues as Secondary Highway 639 north of Quirke Mine Road.

An earlier but unrelated Highway 108 existed for approximately one year in Toronto, following The Queensway between Highway 27 and the Queen Elizabeth Way. Like most provincial highways in Toronto, it was transferred to Metropolitan Toronto after its formation. The current Highway 108 was designated in 1957 and has remained more-or-less unchanged since then.

== Route description ==
Highway 108 is a highway in Algoma District that serves to connect the Trans-Canada Highway with the mines in the Elliot Lake and Quirke Lake area. Elliot Lake is the only community on the highway and is located approximately two-thirds of the distance between Highway 17 and Highway 546. The route begins at Highway 17, 6 kilometres (3.7 mi) east of Spragge and 2 kilometres (1.2 mi) west of Serpent River. It proceeds 24 kilometres (15 mi) north through a lake-ridden and remote wilderness before entering the built-up community of Elliot Lake.

Within the urban portion of Elliot Lake, the highway is locally maintained under a Connecting Link agreement. It passes the Nuclear Mining Museum and the Mount Dufour ski resort before leaving the community and crossing the eastern end of the geographic Elliot Lake. From this point to the northern terminus of the highway, the route provides access to several mines that dot the surrounding areas. Immediately south of Quirke Mine Road, Highway 108 becomes Secondary Highway 639; the centre lane ends and the pavement quality is visibly reduced.

Highway 108 forms part of the Deer Trail tourist route, which continues north along Highway 639, then southwest along Highway 546 to Iron Bridge. Like other provincial routes in Ontario, Highway 108 is maintained by the Ministry of Transportation of Ontario. In 2010, traffic surveys conducted by the ministry showed that on average, 2,250 vehicles used the highway daily along the 4.0-kilometre (2.5 mi) section immediately south of the Elliot Lake Connecting Link while 280 vehicles did so each day along the northernmost section approaching Highway 639, the highest and lowest counts along the highway, respectively.

Looking south over Highway 108 as it slices through Elliot Lake

== History ==
Highway 108 in Algoma is the second highway to carry the designation. In 1953, The Queensway in Toronto was assumed by the Department of Highways (DHO) as the original Highway 108, between Highway 27 (now Highway 427) and the eastern end of the Queen Elizabeth Way at the Humber River. The route was created in order to widen it to provide access from Highway 27 to the new DHO offices at Kipling as well as the Ontario Food Terminal. The designation was short lived, and the route was decommissioned and transferred to the newly formed Metropolitan Toronto on December 26, 1956.

The current iteration of Highway 108 was assumed by the Department of Highways in sections, beginning in late 1957, shortly after the discovery of uranium deposits in the area. Prior to its assumption, the route it followed was designated as Highway 612. The first section, located in the urbanized area of Elliot Lake, was assumed on December 19, 1957. This was followed on December 30 with the majority of the route being assumed. Finally, on January 23, 1958, the northernmost 15 kilometres (9.3 mi) of Highway 612 was designated as part of Highway 108, eliminating that highway entirely. On January 1, 1998, a 5.8 kilometres (3.6 mi) section of the highway was transferred to the Municipality of Elliot Lake. The route has remained unchanged since then.

== Major intersections ==
The following table lists the major junctions along Highway 108, as noted by the Ministry of Transportation of Ontario. The entire route is located in Algoma District.

Location	km	mi	Destinations	Notes
The North Shore	0.0	0.0	Highway 17 / TCH – Sault Ste. Marie, Sudbury	Highway 108 southern terminus
Elliot Lake	20.7	12.9	Nordic Mine Road	Mine access road
Elliot Lake	24.7	15.3	Esten Drive South	Beginning of Elliot Lake Connecting Link agreement
Elliot Lake	30.4	18.9	Timber Road North	End of Elliot Lake Connecting Link agreement
Elliot Lake	37.0	23.0	Stanrock Mine Road	Mine access road
Elliot Lake	40.0	24.9	Denison Mine Road	Mine access road
Elliot Lake	41.0	25.5	Panel Mine Road	Mine access road
Elliot Lake	41.6	25.8	Highway 639 north	Highway 108 northern terminus; continues as Highway 639
1.000 mi = 1.609 km; 1.000 km = 0.621 mi: Route transition
