= List of secondary highways in Algoma District =

List of Ontario secondary highways

This is a list of secondary highways in Algoma District, most of which serve as logging roads or provide access to isolated and sparsely populated areas in the Algoma District of northeastern Ontario. Some of the shorter ones are also access routes for communities with moderate amounts of tourism, most famously St. Joseph Island's highway 548.

== Highway 519 ==
Highway 519

Route information
- Maintained by the Ministry of Transportation of Ontario
- Length: 30.5 km (19.0 mi)

Major junctions
- West end: Highway 17 near Obatanga Provincial Park
- East end: Dubreuilville

Location
- Country: Canada
- Province: Ontario

Highway system
- Ontario provincial highways; Current; Former; 400-series
← Highway 518	→ Highway 520

Secondary Highway 519, commonly referred to as Highway 519, is a provincially maintained highway in the Canadian province of Ontario. The highway is 30.5 km (19.0 mi) in length, connecting Highway 17 near Obatanga Provincial Park with the town of Dubreuilville. A private logging road continues east from there.

Highway 519 was assumed in 1985; its routing has remained unchanged since then. The route is paved throughout its length and encounters no communities of any size along its length, aside from Dubreuilville.

== Highway 532 ==
Highway 532

Route information
- Maintained by the Ministry of Transportation of Ontario
- Length: 14.2 km (8.8 mi)
- Existed: 1974–present

Major junctions
- South end: Highway 556 near Glendale
- North end: Christina Mine Road

Location
- Country: Canada
- Province: Ontario
- Counties: Algoma District
- Towns: Searchmont
- Villages: Wabos

Highway system
- Ontario provincial highways; Current; Former; 400-series
← Highway 531	→ Highway 533

Secondary Highway 532, commonly referred to as Highway 532, is a provincially maintained secondary highway in the Canadian province of Ontario. The route connects several mining and milling towns in Unorganized Algoma District, notably Searchmont. The route is remote, ending at a mine access road 14.2 kilometres (8.8 mi) north of Highway 556, its southern terminus.

A former designation of Highway 532 travelled through Muskoka along the Parry Sound Colonization Road and was redesignated as Highway 141 in 1974. At that time, the present route was established following what was until then a segment of Highway 556. It has remained unchanged since then.

== Highway 538 ==
Highway 538

Route information
- Maintained by the Ministry of Transportation of Ontario
- Length: 5.6 km (3.5 mi)
- Existed: 1956–present

Major junctions
- West end: Highway 17 at Algoma Mills
- East end: Highway 17 between Algoma Mills and Pronto

Location
- Country: Canada
- Province: Ontario
- Towns: North Shore

Highway system
- Ontario provincial highways; Current; Former; 400-series
← Highway 537	→ Highway 539

Secondary Highway 538, commonly referred to as Highway 538, is a provincially maintained highway in the Canadian province of Ontario. The highway is 5.6 kilometres (3.5 mi) in length and follows an older alignment of Highway 17 east of Blind River, between the Canadian Pacific Railway tracks and the shoreline of the North Channel of Lake Huron, while the present Highway 17 runs north of the railway tracks. The route was designated in 1956 and has remained unchanged since.

== Highway 546 ==
Highway 546

Route information
- Maintained by the Ministry of Transportation of Ontario
- Length: 76.5 km (47.5 mi)

Major junctions
- Southwest end: Highway 17 at Iron Bridge
- Highway 639 north of Elliot Lake
- Northeast end: Mount Lake

Location
- Country: Canada
- Province: Ontario
- Towns: Iron Bridge, Parkinson

Highway system
- Ontario provincial highways; Current; Former; 400-series
← Highway 545	→ Highway 547

Secondary Highway 546, commonly referred to as Highway 546, is a secondary highway in the Canadian province of Ontario. Located within the Algoma District, the highway extends for 76.5 kilometres (47.5 mi) from a junction with Highway 17 at Iron Bridge to Mount Lake, 12.5 kilometres (7.8 mi) northeast of a junction with Highway 639 north of Elliot Lake.

Between the intersections with Highway 17 and Highway 639, the highway is part of the Deer Trail tourist route. From north of the intersection with Highway 554, it follows the Little White River.

== Highway 547 ==
Highway 547

Route information
- Maintained by the Ministry of Transportation of Ontario
- Length: 5.6 km (3.5 mi)
- Existed: February 27, 1964–present

Major junctions
- South end: Highway 101 near Wawa
- North end: Cedar Street in Hawk Junction

Location
- Country: Canada
- Province: Ontario
- Counties: Algoma District

Highway system
- Ontario provincial highways; Current; Former; 400-series
← Highway 546	→ Highway 548

Secondary Highway 547, commonly referred to as Highway 547, is a secondary highway in the Canadian province of Ontario. Located within the Algoma District, the highway spans a distance of 5.6 kilometres (3.5 mi), connecting the community of Hawk Junction to Highway 101 near Wawa.

== Highway 548 ==
Highway 548

Route information
- Maintained by Ministry of Transportation of Ontario
- Length: 74.6 km (46.4 mi)

Major junctions
- North end: Highway 17 near Desbarats
- South end: Highway 548 (69.1 km (42.9 mi) loop around St. Joseph Island)

Location
- Country: Canada
- Province: Ontario

Highway system
- Ontario provincial highways; Current; Former; 400-series
← Highway 547	→ Highway 550

Secondary Highway 548, commonly referred to as Highway 548, is a secondary highway in the Canadian province of Ontario. Despite the route's secondary highway designation, it is the main and most important highway of St. Joseph Island. This highway consists of the Bernt Gilbertson Bridge to the island and a continuous loop route that circles the island.

The highway connects the hamlets of Richard's Landing and Hilton Beach, and guides tourists to Fort St. Joseph. Between the bridge road and Richard's Landing, as well as along the bridge route, it is built up to King's Highway standards. The remainder of the route is built to secondary highway standards, with a single solid centerline throughout.

=== North-south segment ===
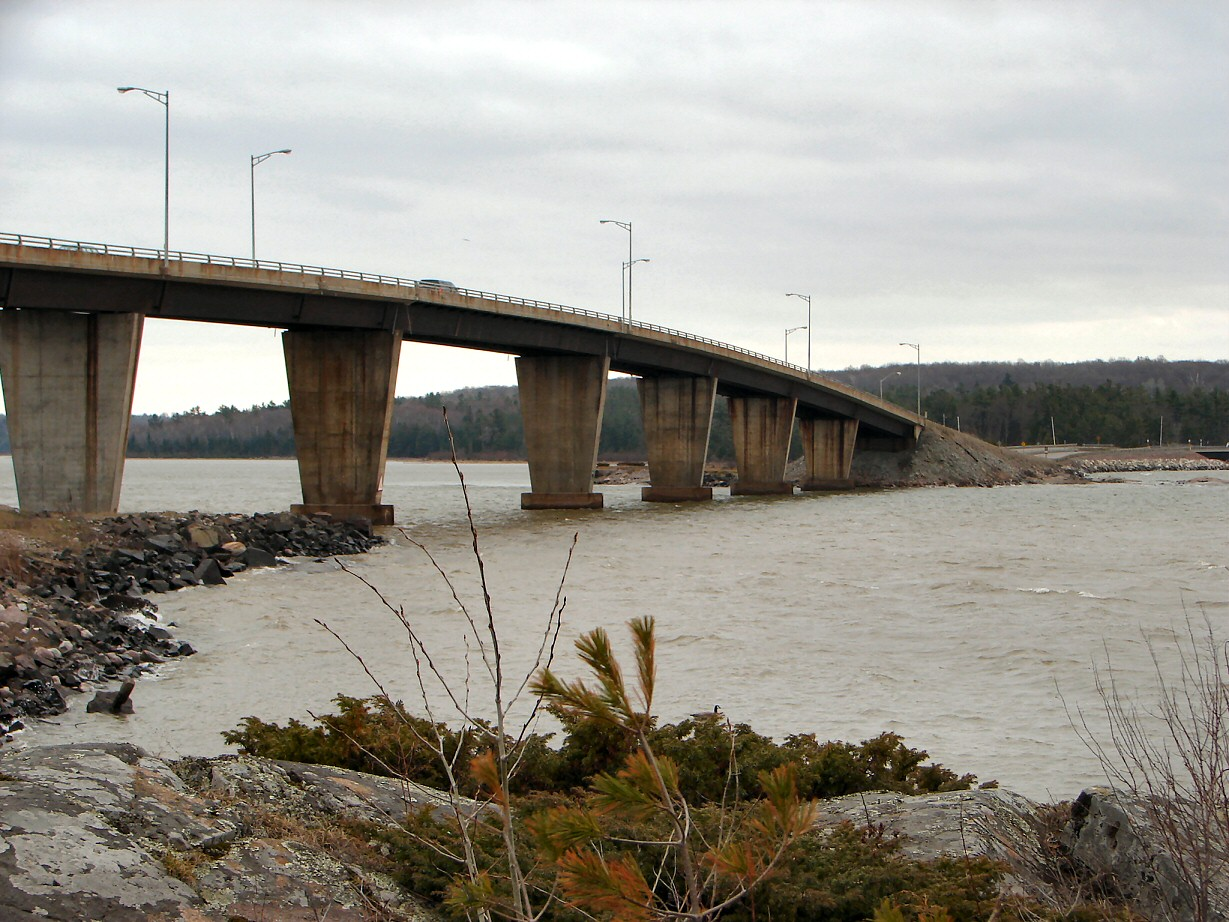
Highway 548 bridge to St Joseph Island

The north-south segment of the highway connects the loop segment with Ontario's mainland. To the north, it terminates at Highway 17/Trans Canada Highway, and to the south, it ends at a t-intersection with the loop segment at Kents Corners, 5.4 kilometres (3.4 mi) south of Highway 17.

=== Loop segment ===
The loop segment is a continuous loop around St. Joseph's Island for 69.1 km (42.9 mi). To aid in navigation and addressing, segments of the loop have been given suffix letters by the local municipalities, which usually correspond to the local road name. For example, the portion of Highway 548 which is signed along D Line is named 548D, along Huron Line is it named 548H, etc.

== Highway 550 ==
Highway 550
- Second Line

Route information
- Maintained by Ministry of Transportation of Ontario
- Length: 11.3 km (7.0 mi)
- Existed: 1956–present

Major junctions
- West end: Dead end in Gros Cap, Ontario
- Highway 565; Highway 550B
- East end: Highway 17 in Sault Ste. Marie

Location
- Country: Canada
- Province: Ontario
- Major cities: Sault Ste. Marie, Ontario

Highway system
- Ontario provincial highways; Current; Former; 400-series
← Highway 548	→ Highway 550B

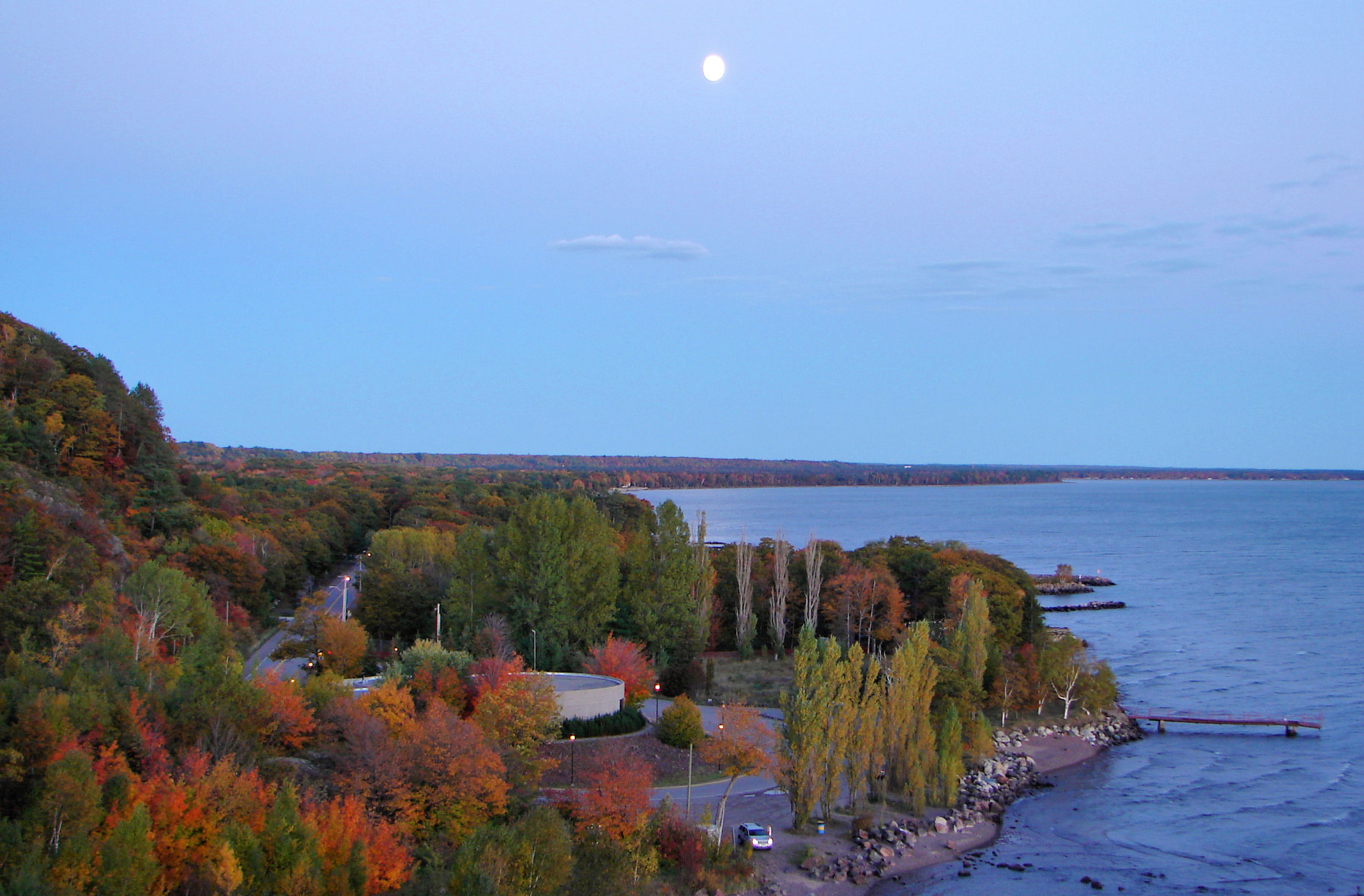
Roundabout at the western end of Hwy. 550 in Gros Cap.

Secondary Highway 550, commonly referred to as Highway 550, is a secondary highway in the Canadian province of Ontario. It runs east/west from the city of Sault Ste. Marie, Ontario to the hamlet of Gros Cap in Prince Township. It is known as Second Line within the Sault's city limits.

Its eastern terminus is an intersection with Highway 17, the Trans-Canada Highway, at the north end of the city. From here it is a four-lane undivided road, used heavily by commercial truck traffic as a link between Highway 17 and Carmen's Way (Highway 550B), the truck bypass linking Second Line with the International Bridge. Trucks are now able to avoid the downtown core by using Highway 17, Highway 550, and Carmen's Way to reach the border with the U.S. Highway 550 reduces to two lanes west of Goulais Avenue. The highway intersects with Highway 565, also known as Airport Road. Highway 550 continues to its western terminus, at a roundabout on the shores of Lake Superior, in Gros Cap.

The MTO maintains the 9.1 km (5.7 mi) portion of Highway 550 west of Town Line Road. A 2.2 km (1.4 mi) section of Second Line between Carmen's Way and Highway 17 (Great Northern Road) is maintained under a Connecting Link agreement. The remainder, between Town Line Road and Carmen's Way, is maintained by the city of Sault Ste. Marie.

== Highway 550B ==
Highway 550B
- Carmen's Way

Route information
- Auxiliary route of Highway 550
- Maintained by the Corporation of the City of Sault Ste. Marie under a Connecting Link agreement with the Ministry of Transportation of Ontario
- Length: 2.88 km (1.79 mi)

Major junctions
- North end: Highway 550
- Wellington Street West
- South end: Huron Street near the Sault Ste. Marie International Bridge

Location
- Country: Canada
- Province: Ontario
- Major cities: Sault Ste. Marie, Ontario

Highway system
- Ontario provincial highways; Current; Former; 400-series
← Highway 550	→ Highway 551

Secondary Highway 550B, commonly referred to as Carmen's Way, is an unmarked secondary highway in the Canadian province of Ontario, located within the Algoma District. It runs south from Highway 550 2.2 km (1.4 mi) east of its intersection with Highway 17, the Trans-Canada Highway, to Huron Street near the Sault Ste. Marie International Bridge. The highway runs entirely within the city of Sault Ste. Marie, Ontario and is entirely maintained under a Connecting Link agreement.

The highway runs south along Carmen's Way and turns east along Queen Street West until an intersection with Huron Street near the international crossing. The highway is not marked with 550B shields; instead, southbound, it is marked with "To USA" trailblazer shields, and northbound, it is marked with "To 17" trailblazer shields.

== Highway 552 ==
Highway 552

Route information
- Maintained by the Ministry of Transportation of Ontario
- Length: 18.3 km (11.4 mi)

Major junctions
- Southeast end: Highway 556 at Island Lake
- Highway 17 near Karalash Corners
- Northwest end: Grant's Road in Goulais Bay

Location
- Country: Canada
- Province: Ontario
- Counties: Algoma District

Highway system
- Ontario provincial highways; Current; Former; 400-series
← Highway 551	→ Highway 553

Secondary Highway 552, commonly referred to as Highway 552, is a secondary highway in the Canadian province of Ontario, located within the Algoma District. Commencing at a junction with Highway 556 in the community of Island Lake, the highway extends northwesterly for 18.3 kilometres (11.4 mi) to the community of Goulais Bay.

It passes through the communities of Kirby's Corner and Bourdage Corner, and intersects with Highway 17, the main route of the Trans-Canada Highway, just outside Karalash Corners.

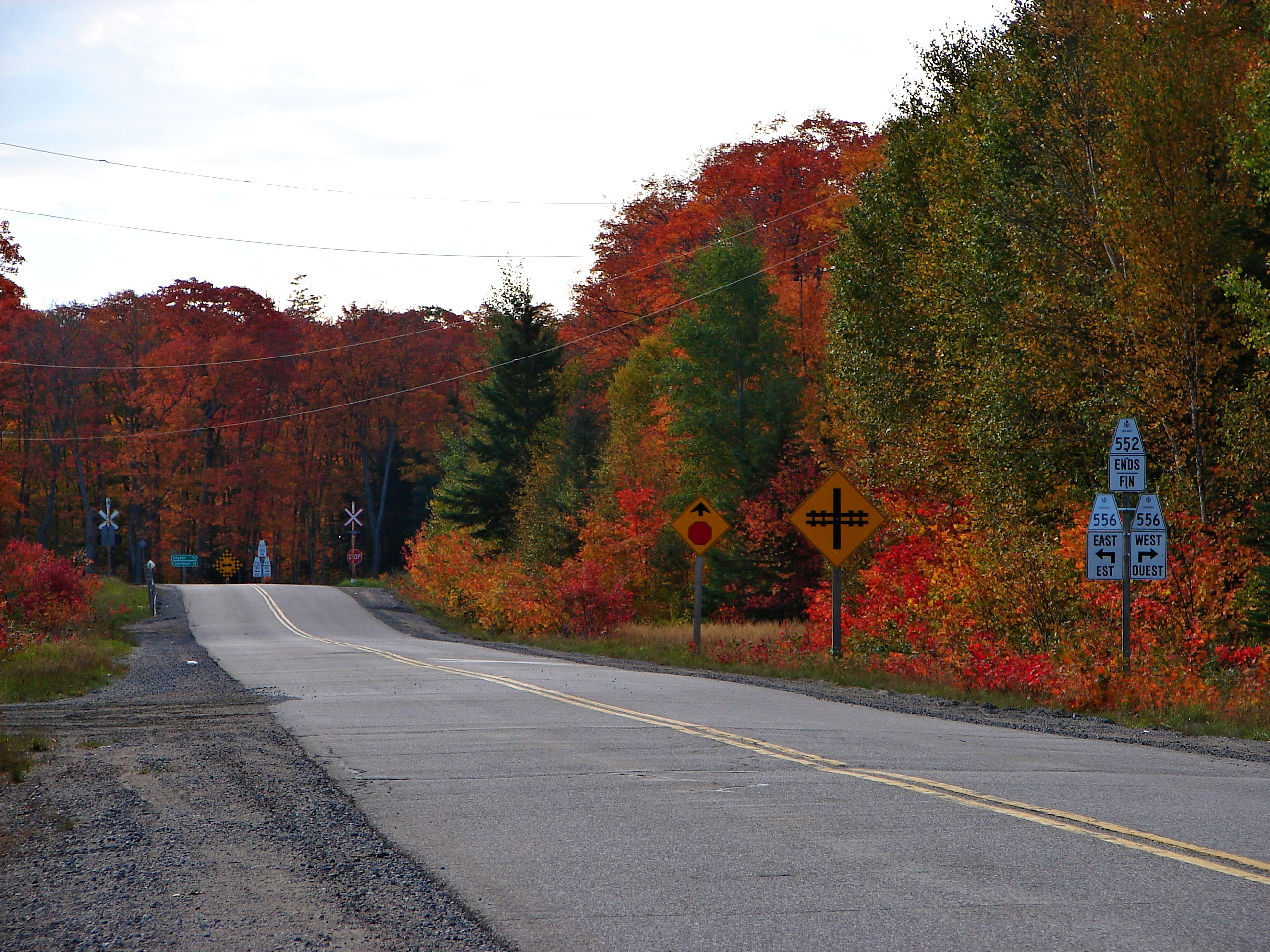
Highway 552 near Island Lake

== Highway 554 ==
Highway 554

Route information
- Maintained by the Ministry of Transportation of Ontario
- Length: 16.6 km (10.3 mi)

Major junctions
- Northwest end: Highway 129 northeast of Wharncliffe
- Southeast end: Highway 546 near Parkinson

Location
- Country: Canada
- Province: Ontario
- Major cities: Kynoch, Parkinson

Highway system
- Ontario provincial highways; Current; Former; 400-series
← Highway 553	→ Highway 555

Secondary Highway 554, commonly referred to as Highway 554, is a short secondary highway in the Canadian province of Ontario. Located within the Algoma District, the highway extends for 16.6 kilometres (10.3 mi) from a junction with Highway 129 northeast of Wharncliffe to a junction with Highway 546 near Parkinson. The highway follows the valley of the Little White River for most of its length.

== Highway 555 ==
Secondary Highway 555, commonly referred to as Highway 555, is the former designation for a secondary highway in Blind River, which extended from Highway 17 to Granary Lake. The highway also had the street names Woodward Avenue in the main population centre of Blind River, and Granary Lake Road north of Highway 557.

When the route number was removed from the system in the 1990s, the portion of the route south of the Highway 557 intersection was renumbered as an extension of Highway 557. The Granary Lake Road section was entirely decommissioned from the provincial highway system, and now exists only as a local road.

In 1991, the Ministry of Transportation issued a report which proposed that the route be extended to meet Spine Road in Elliot Lake, creating an alternate route which would reduce the length of a commute between Elliot Lake and Blind River by approximately 20 kilometres compared to the current routes of Highway 17 and Highway 108. While the ministry has not announced a plan to proceed with the construction, in 2015 Elliot Lake's city council passed a motion calling for the project to be revived.

== Highway 556 ==
Highway 556
- Searchmont Highway, Ranger Lake Road

Route information
- Maintained by the Ministry of Transportation of Ontario
- Length: 103.7 km (64.4 mi)

Major junctions
- From: Highway 17 at Heyden
- Highway 532 near Searchmont
- To: Highway 129 near Aubrey Falls

Location
- Country: Canada
- Province: Ontario

Highway system
- Ontario provincial highways; Current; Former; 400-series
← Highway 555	→ Highway 557

Secondary Highway 556, commonly referred to as Highway 556 or Ranger Lake Road is a secondary highway in the province of Ontario, Canada. Its western terminus is at Highway 17 in the hamlet of Heyden, just north of Sault Ste. Marie. Its eastern terminus is at Highway 129.

It is 103.7 kilometres (64.4 mi) in length, of which only 27 km (17 mi) are paved. This paved section runs from its western terminus to the intersection with Highway 532 near Searchmont and is therefore informally known as the Searchmont Highway. From this point, the highway surface is rough gravel for its remaining length. Ranger Lake is the only community on this portion of Highway 556. Despite its relatively poor surface, it is considered an alternate link between Chapleau and Sault Ste. Marie.

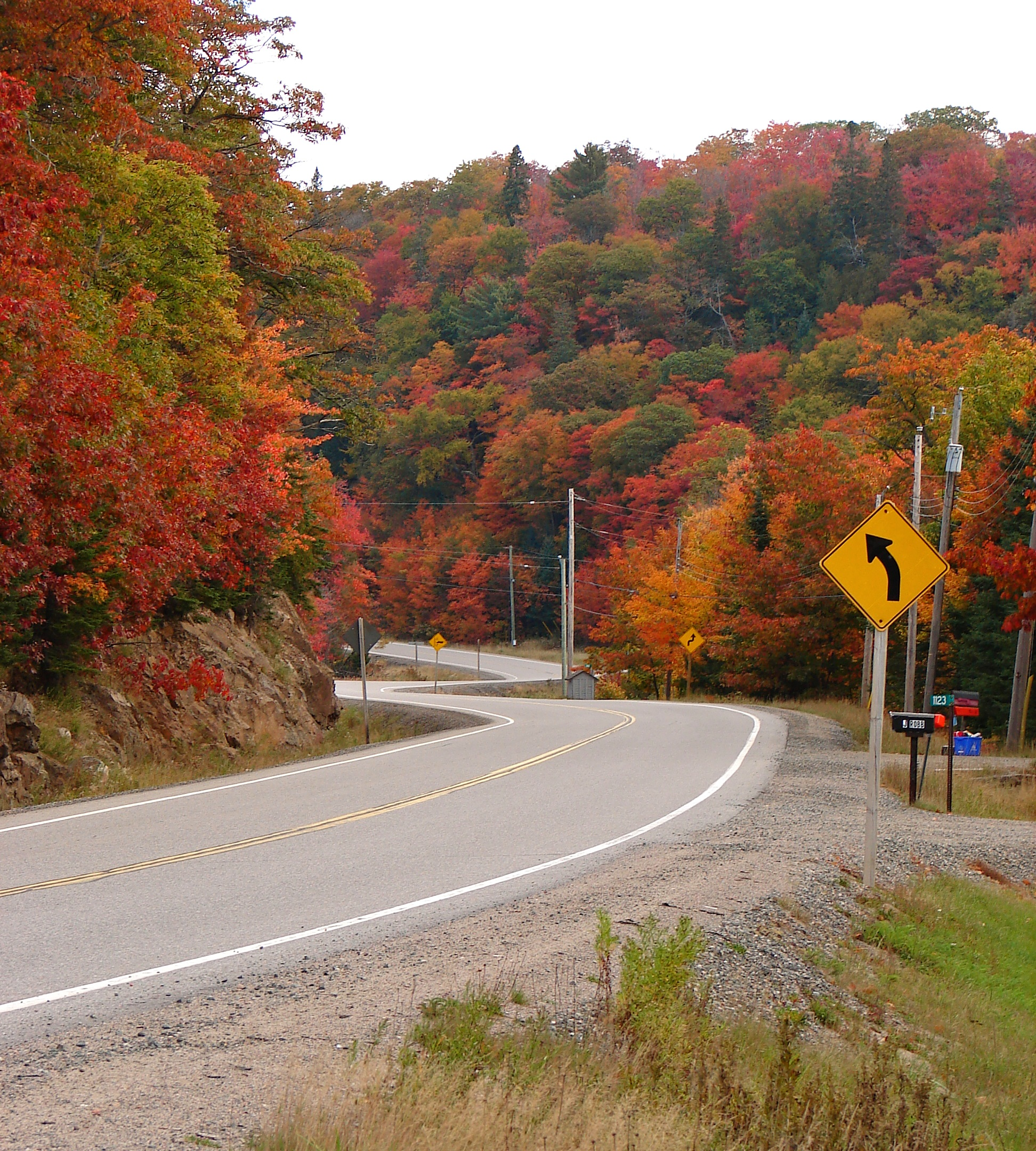
Hwy 556 near Island Lake

== Highway 557 ==
Highway 557

Route information
- Maintained by the Ministry of Transportation of Ontario
- Length: 19.7 km (12.2 mi)

Major junctions
- South end: Granary Lake Road near Blind River (signed south to Highway 17)
- North end: Matinenda Lake

Location
- Country: Canada
- Province: Ontario
- Counties: Algoma District

Highway system
- Ontario provincial highways; Current; Former; 400-series
← Highway 556	→ Highway 558

Secondary Highway 557, commonly referred to as Highway 557, is a secondary highway in the Canadian province of Ontario, located within the Algoma District. Commencing at a junction with Highway 17 in the town of Blind River, the highway extends northerly for 22.9 km (14.2 mi) to the shore of Matinenda Lake, providing the primary road access to Matinenda Lake Provincial Park as well as to rural parts of the town of Blind River and the neighbouring Mississauga First Nation. The road has the street name Woodward Avenue from Highway 17 to Granary Lake Road, and Matinenda Road west of that intersection.

Prior to the late 1990s, the Woodward Avenue segment of the highway was designated as Highway 555. The 557 designation applied only to Matinenda Road, while the 555 designation continued along Granary Lake Road. When Granary Lake Road was decommissioned from the provincial highway system, the 557 designation was extended along Woodward Avenue rather than the 555 designation being shifted from Granary to Matinenda.

The MTO does not maintain the 3.2 km (2.0 mi) section of Highway 557 south of the Granary Lake Road intersection through Blind River, This section is signed as part of the highway for continuity to Highway 17.

== Highway 563 ==
Highway 563

Route information
- Maintained by Ministry of Transportation of Ontario
- Length: 5.5 km (3.4 mi)

Major junctions
- South end: Batchawana Bay government dock at Lake Superior
- North end: Highway 17 – Wawa, Sault Ste. Marie

Location
- Country: Canada
- Province: Ontario
- Counties: Algoma District

Highway system
- Ontario provincial highways; Current; Former; 400-series
← Highway 562	→ Highway 564

Secondary Highway 563, commonly referred to as Highway 563, is a secondary highway in the Canadian province of Ontario, beginning at Highway 17/Trans Canada Highway about 70 kilometres (43 mi) north of Sault Ste. Marie, and following the shoreline of Batchawana Bay. The area is a vacation spot, and Highway 563 goes through the community of the same name as the bay. Batchawana Bay has a church, post office, elementary school, motel, and homes for the permanent residents, among them First Nations people. Near the Hwy 563/17 junction is the Carp River, and there are rental cabins along the riverbank.

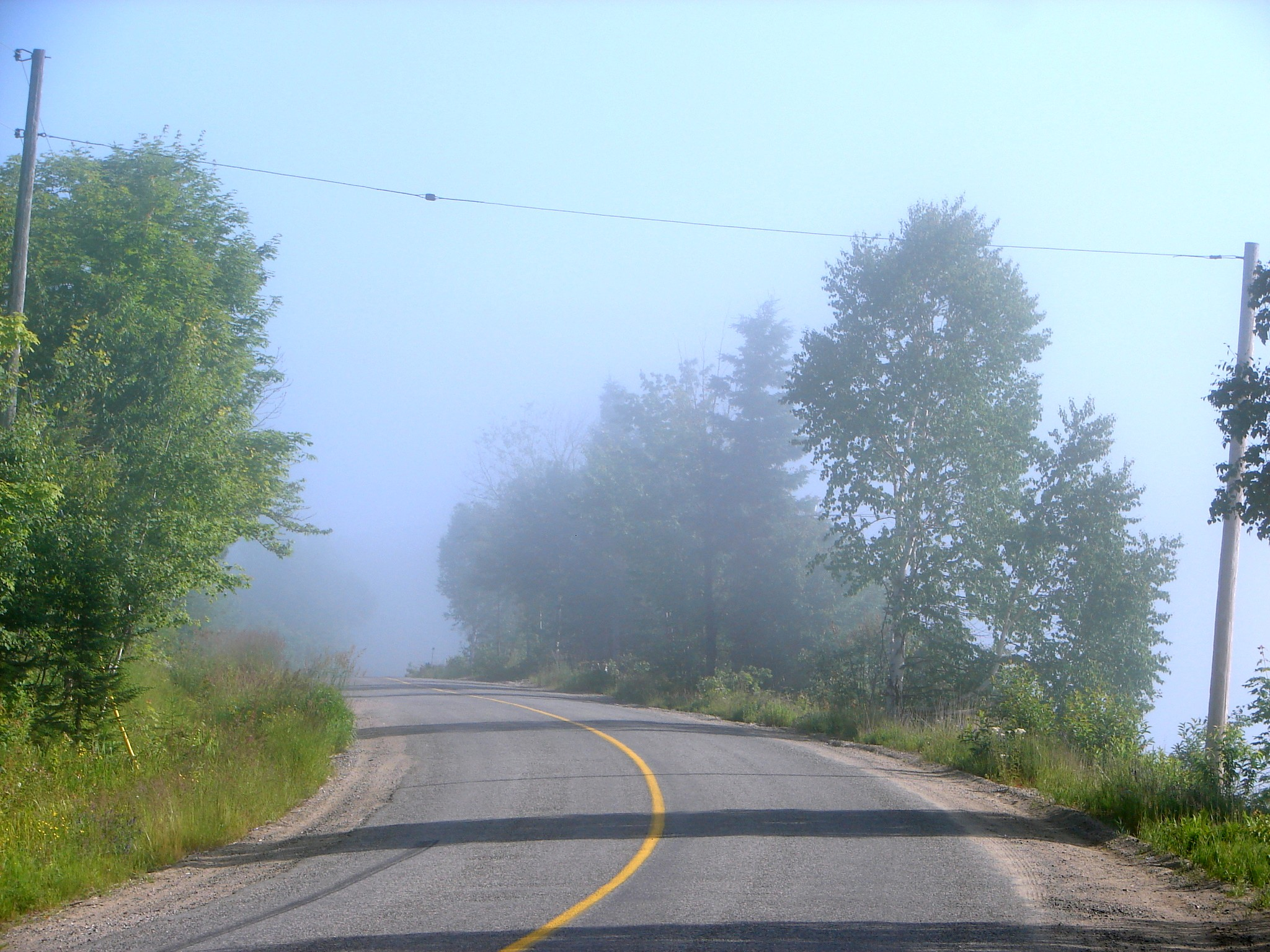
Highway 563 along Batchawana Bay

== Highway 565 ==
Highway 565
- Airport Road

Route information
- Maintained by Ministry of Transportation of Ontario
- Length: 1.6 km (0.99 mi)

Major junctions
- South end: Prince/Sault Ste. Marie municipal boundary
- North end: Highway 550 in Prince

Location
- Country: Canada
- Province: Ontario
- Major cities: Sault Ste. Marie, Ontario

Highway system
- Ontario provincial highways; Current; Former; 400-series
← Highway 564	→ Highway 566

Secondary Highway 565, commonly referred to as Highway 565, is a secondary highway in the Canadian province of Ontario, near Sault Ste. Marie. More commonly known as Airport Road, the highway is approximately 1.6 kilometres (0.99 mi) in length, shortened from its original length of 4.4 kilometres (2.7 mi) before municipal downloading. Originally, Highway 565's southern terminus was the intersection of Point-Aux-Pins Road, near the St. Mary's River. It was initially truncated at the entrance to Sault Ste. Marie Airport but now ends at Base Line, at the Sault Ste. Marie-Prince Township boundary.

== Highway 631 ==
Highway 631

Route information
- Maintained by the Ministry of Transportation of Ontario
- Length: 167 km (104 mi)

Major junctions
- South end: Highway 17 in White River
- North end: Highway 11

Location
- Country: Canada
- Province: Ontario
- Major cities: Hornepayne, White River

Highway system
- Ontario provincial highways; Current; Former; 400-series
← Highway 630	→ Highway 632

Secondary Highway 631, commonly referred to as Highway 631, is a secondary highway in the Algoma District of Northern Ontario. This highway is roughly 167.2 kilometres (103.9 mi) in length, and connects Highway 17 at White River with Highway 11 between Hearst and Longlac.

The northern section of the highway, connecting Hornepayne to Highway 11, was completed in 1959. Surveying for the southern section began in 1962; the highway was completed at a cost of $7.5 million, and opened on May 26, 1973. The White River terminus became a subject of brief controversy after it was rerouted to meet Highway 17 within property owned by the town's mayor, Naldo Bracci.

Highway 631 is a very isolated road. There are no services available nor any development along its entire length except at Hornepayne, the only community situated on it, about 100 kilometres (60 mi) from White River.

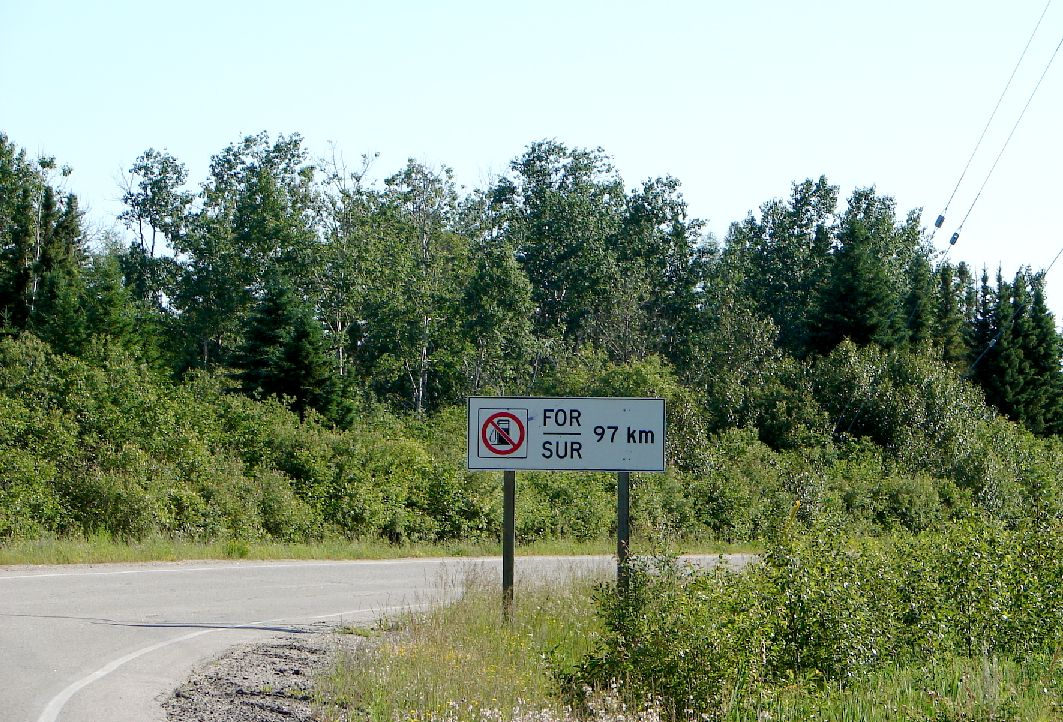
"No fuel for 97 km" sign in White River

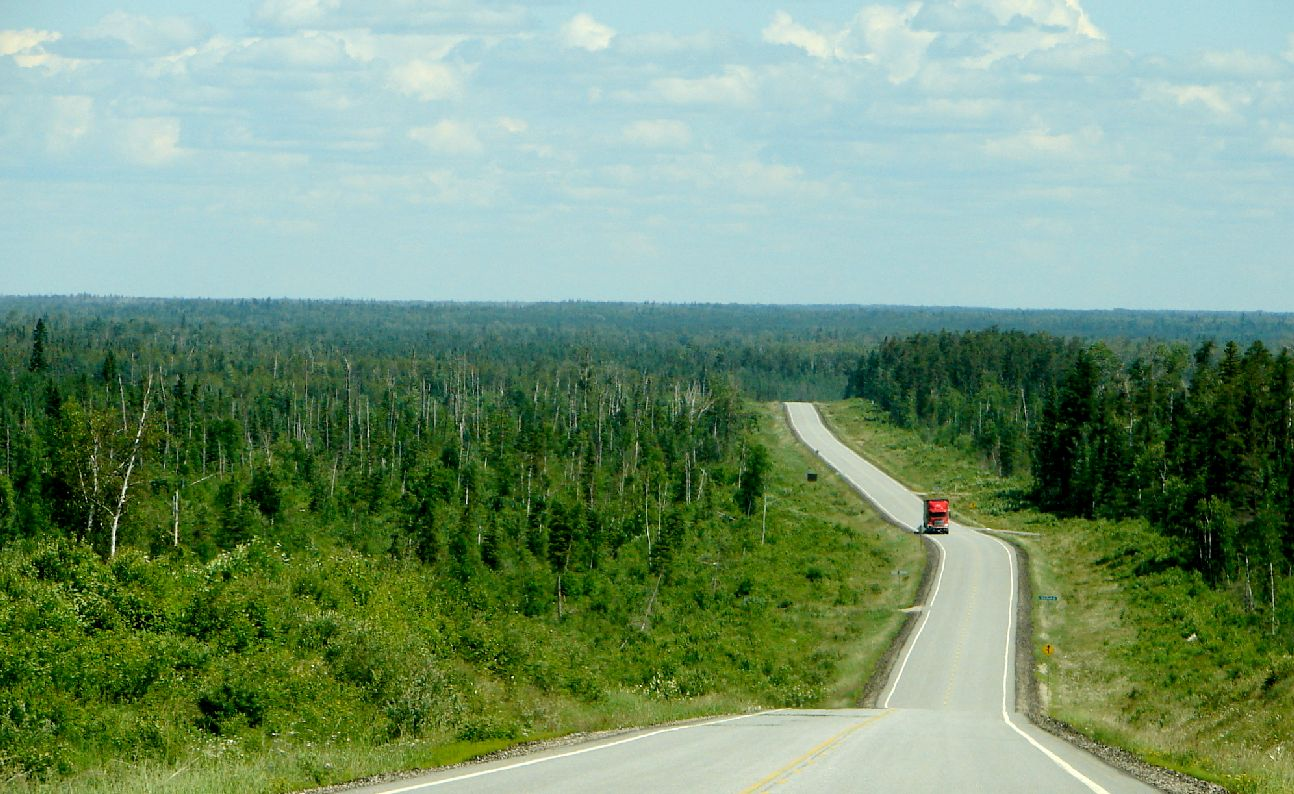
View along Hwy. 631.

== Highway 638 ==
Highway 638

Route information
- Maintained by the Ministry of Transportation of Ontario
- Length: 52.1 km (32.4 mi)

Major junctions
- Northwest end: Highway 17B in Echo Bay
- Highway 17 in Echo Bay; Highway 670 at Ophir
- Southeast end: Highway 17 in Bruce Mines

Location
- Country: Canada
- Province: Ontario
- Major cities: Echo Bay, Bruce Mines

Highway system
- Ontario provincial highways; Current; Former; 400-series
← Highway 637	→ Highway 639

Secondary Highway 638, commonly referred to as Highway 638, is a secondary highway located in the District of Algoma in Ontario. The highway measures 52.1 kilometres (32.4 mi) in length, extending from Echo Bay eastward through the communities of Sylvan Valley, Leeburn and Ophir, where it turns southward and runs south through Rydal Bank, Bruce Station, and finally to its southeastern terminus, also at Highway 17, in the town of Bruce Mines.

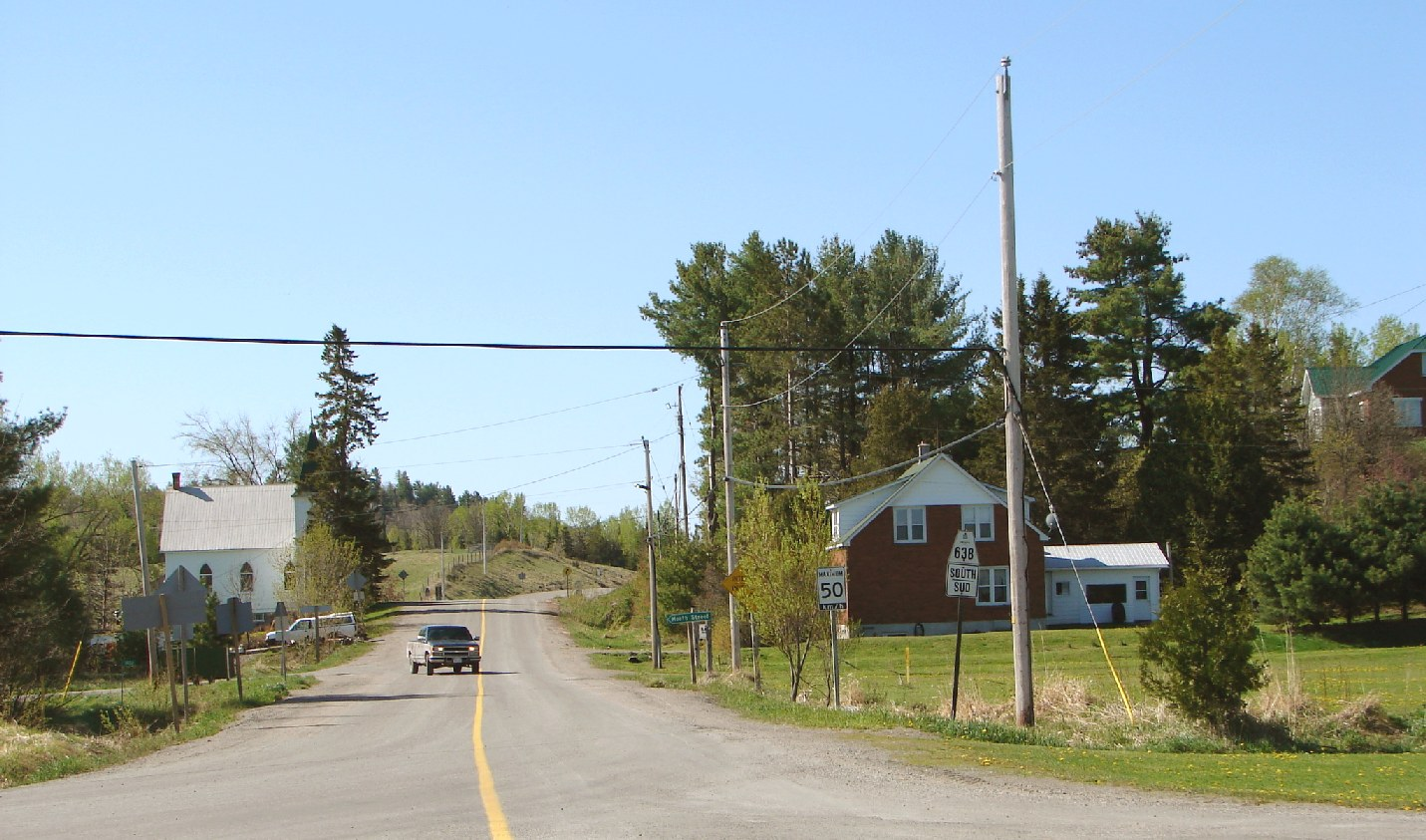
Highway 638 in Rydal Bank

== Highway 639 ==
Highway 639

Route information
- Maintained by the Ministry of Transportation of Ontario
- Length: 23.2 km (14.4 mi)

Major junctions
- South end: Highway 108 at Quirke Mine Road in Elliot Lake
- North end: Highway 546 north of Elliot Lake

Location
- Country: Canada
- Province: Ontario
- Major cities: Elliot Lake

Highway system
- Ontario provincial highways; Current; Former; 400-series
← Highway 638	→ Highway 640

Secondary Highway 639, commonly referred to as Highway 639, is a secondary highway in the Canadian province of Ontario. Located within the Algoma District, the highway extends for 23.2 kilometres (14.4 mi) from the junction of Highway 108 and Quirke Mine Road, near the northern city limits of Elliot Lake, to a junction with Highway 546 north of the city.

The highway does not link the city to any significant residential settlements, but is used primarily as an access road to Mississagi Provincial Park and a few recreational lodges. The highway had an average daily traffic count of just 70 vehicles in 2007.

The highway is a continuation of the same roadway as Highway 108, the main highway into Elliot Lake from the south. It is part of the Deer Trail tourist route.

== Highway 651 ==
Highway 651

Route information
- Maintained by the Ministry of Transportation of Ontario
- Length: 52.9 km (32.9 mi)
- History: Established July 1, 1967; Extended April 30, 1969

Major junctions
- South end: Highway 101
- North end: CPR crossing in Missanabie

Location
- Country: Canada
- Province: Ontario
- Districts: Algoma

Highway system
- Ontario provincial highways; Current; Former; 400-series
← Highway 650	→ Highway 652

Secondary Highway 651, commonly referred to as Highway 651, is a provincially maintained highway in the Canadian province of Ontario. The highway is 52.9 kilometres (32.9 mi) in length, connecting Highway 101 east of Wawa with the remote community of Missanabie.

Highway 651 was established on Centennial anniversary of Confederation, but did not connect to any other roads originally; access to the route was provided from Missanabie. While this situation has since been remedied, the route nevertheless remains extremely isolated.

== Highway 670 ==
Highway 670

Route information
- Maintained by the Ministry of Transportation of Ontario
- Length: 9.3 km (5.8 mi)
- Existed: 1989–present

Major junctions
- West end: Highway 638 at Ophir
- East end: Nardi Road at Dunns Valley

Location
- Country: Canada
- Province: Ontario
- Counties: Algoma District

Highway system
- Ontario provincial highways; Current; Former; 400-series
← Highway 668	→ Highway 671

Secondary Highway 670, commonly referred to as Highway 670, is a 9.3-kilometre (5.8 mi) two-lane gravel road running from Highway 638 at Ophir at its western terminus to Dunns Valley at its eastern terminus, which ends at Nardi road. At Highway 670 and Nardi Road, the roadway can continue north to Skookum lake (under a different designation), east along "The Shaw" road to Little Rapids (just north of Thessalon, Ontario) or west, down Nardi road that opens to an 800-acre farm land held within a horseshoe of mountains.

Highway 670 was established in mid- to late 1989, when a 9.5 km (5.9 mi) segment of Highway 638 between Ophir and Dunns Valley was renumbered.
