= Wharncliffe and Kynoch =

Coordinates: 46.4350°N 83.3217°W

Wharncliffe and Kynoch is a local services board in the Canadian province of Ontario, consisting of the unincorporated communities of Wharncliffe and Kynoch in the Algoma District.

The area is counted as part of Algoma, Unorganized, North Part in Statistics Canada census data.

The community of Wharncliffe is located on Highway 129, while Kynoch is located several kilometres northeast of Wharncliffe on the route of Highway 554.
