= Goulais and District =

Local services board in Algoma District, Ontario, Canada

Coordinates: 46°44′30″N 84°21′20″W

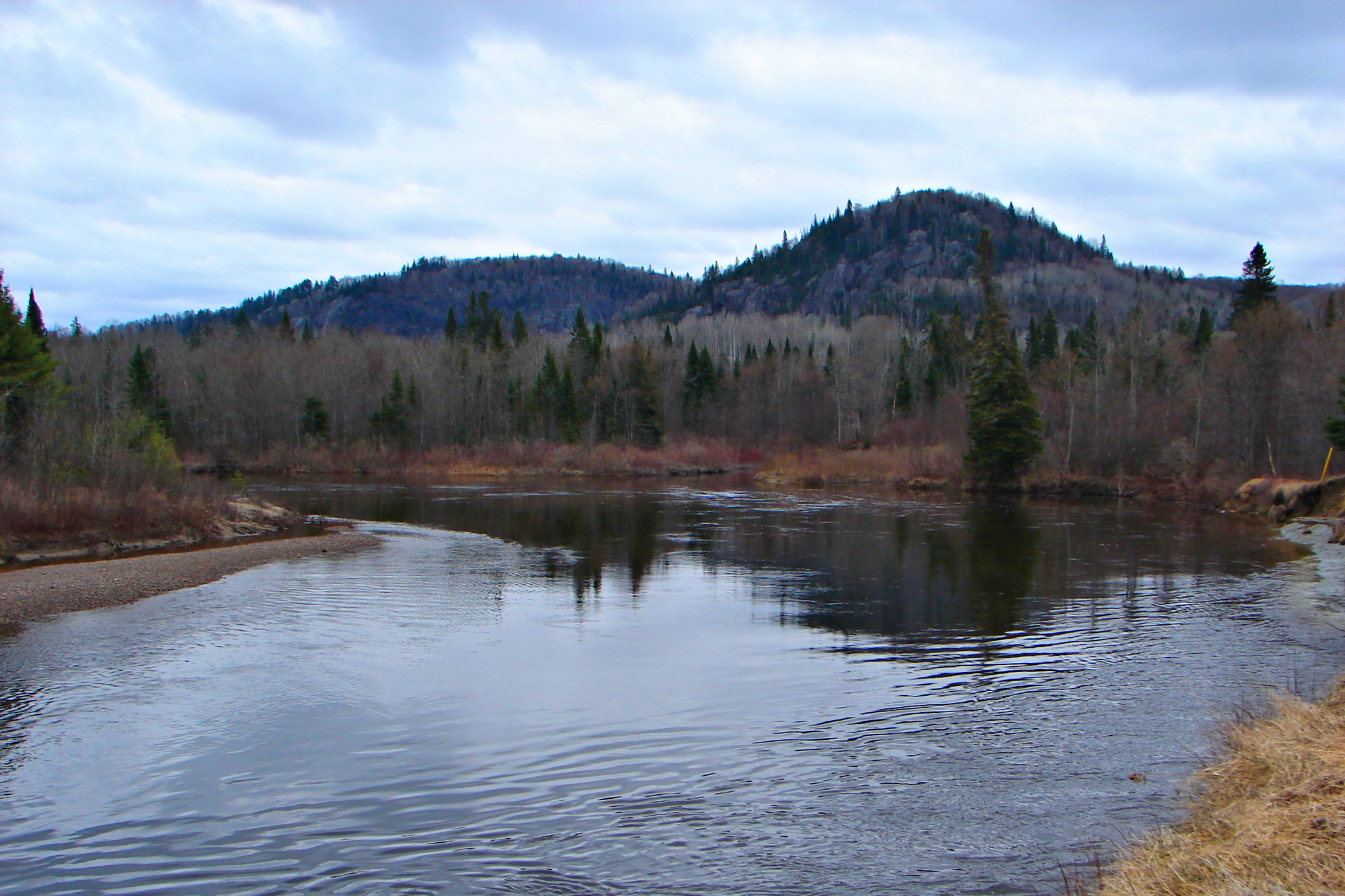
Goulais River

Goulais and District is a local services board in the Canadian province of Ontario. Located in the Algoma District north of Sault Ste. Marie, it encompasses and provides services to the unincorporated townships of Dennis North, Fenwick, Havilland, Kars, Ley, Pennefather, Tupper and Vankoughnet, including the communities of Bellevue, Bourdage Corner, Goulais Bay, Goulais River, Karalash Corners, Kirby's Corner, and Sand Bay.

In the community of Goulais Bay, on the grounds of Our Lady of Sorrows Roman Catholic Church built by Frederic Baraga, an Ontario Provincial Plaque explains that he was a pioneer missionary in northwestern Ontario responsible for Jesuit missions from Bruce Mines, Ontario, to Thunder Bay, Ontario. Frederic Baraga produced an Ojibwa grammar and dictionary which are still in use.

Goulais River is located at the western terminus of Highway 552. The community began in 1882 and was founded by Captain Fred Tilly, for whom the town's Captain Tilly Community Centre is named. The post office was established about 1940. Today, the commercial centre of Goulais River consists of the combination general store and post office but also has a variety of churches, stores and other services in the area. The community was formerly served by the Goulaigan Free Press community newspaper, but is now only served by the Northern Newsletter.

== See also ==
- Goulais Bay 15A
