= Peace Tree, Ontario =

Coordinates: 46.6485°N 84.3126°W

Peace Tree is a local services board in the Canadian province of Ontario, located in the Algoma District.

The area administers the portion of the geographic township of Aweres located northwest of Heyden along the Trans-Canada Highway, including the suburban subdivision centred on Peace Tree Drive.
