= The North Shore, Ontario =

The North Shore
- Township (single-tier)
- Township of The North Shore
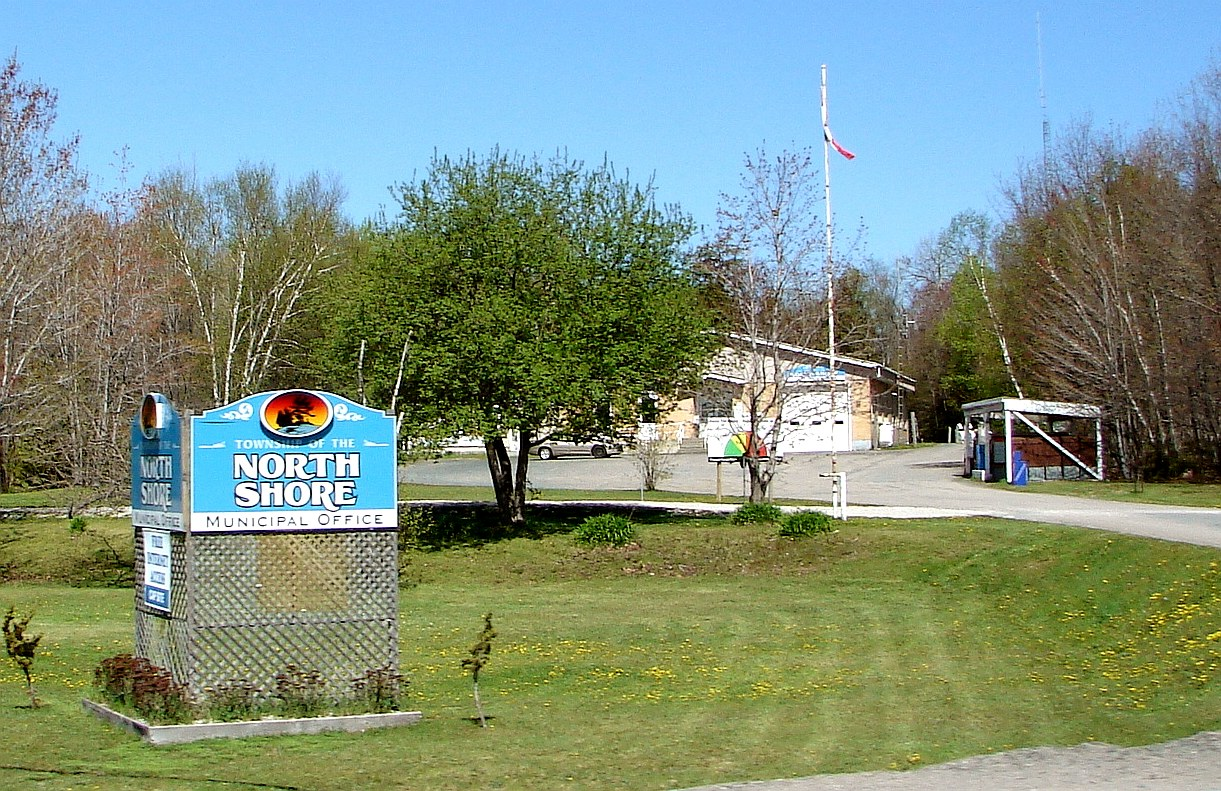
- North Shore municipal offices

- Location within Ontario
- Coordinates: 46°14′N 82°38′W
- Country: Canada
- Province: Ontario
- District: Algoma
- Incorporated: 1978

Government
  - Type: Township
  - Mayor: Tony Moor
  - Governing Body: North Shore Township Council
  - MP: Terry Sheehan (Liberal)
  - MPP: Bill Rosenberg (PC)
  - Settled: 1860s

Area
  - Land: 230.17 km^{2} (88.87 sq mi)

Population (2021)
  - Total: 531
  - Density: 2.3/km^{2} (6.0/sq mi)
- Time zone: UTC−5 (EST)
  - Summer (DST): UTC−4 (EDT)
- Postal code FSA: P0R
- Area codes: 705, 249
- Website: www.townshipofthenorthshore.ca

The North Shore is a township in the Canadian province of Ontario, located in the Algoma District. The township had a population of 531 in the 2021 Canadian census. It is along the north shore of the North Channel of Lake Huron (hence its name), with its main communities all along Highway 17.

The Township of The North Shore was established as an Improvement District in March 1973. In 1978, the first municipal elections were held, with Craege McQuarrie elected as first reeve. In 1985, the Town of Spanish split off from the North Shore to become a separate municipality.

== Communities ==
=== Algoma Mills ===
Algoma Mills (46°11′07″N 82°48′46″W) is located between the North Channel and Lauzon Lake, near the township's western boundary with Blind River. The Algoma Mills Water Aerodrome serves the community.

Algoma Mills was founded in 1860 when a mill was built at the mouth of the Lauzon Creek by Alfred Lauzon, who also built a wharf, tramway, dam, and a log slide, as well as houses for him and his workers. By 1881, the mill was property of the Canadian Pacific Railway that used the site for the construction and operation of their railroad to Sudbury. From 1905 to 1910, Algoma Mills was CPR's major transshipment port for coal. 200,000 tons of coal arrived there annually to be shipped by rail to North Bay, Sudbury, Sault Ste. Marie, Cartier, and Mactier. In 1927, the CPR closed the Algoma Mills station.

=== Moiles Mills ===
Moiles Mills (46°08′00″N 82°33′00″W) is a ghost town. It was established as a lumber town in April 1889 and burned down in 1918. The former townsite is now the site of John Island Camp, a children's summer camp operated by the YMCA.

=== Serpent River ===
Serpent River (46°12′42″N 82°32′34″W) is located at the junction of highways 17 and 108. It formed in the 1950s due to the opening of uranium mines in Elliot Lake, but declined once those mines closed in the early 1990s.

=== Spragge ===
Originally known as Cook's Mills, Spragge (46°12′30″N 82°39′35″W) was established in 1882 when the Cook Brothers Lumber Company built a sawmill at this location. The mill operated until 1906 when it was sold to Waldie Brothers Lumber Company. With the mill no longer in Cook's ownership, Spragge (the original name of the township in which it is located), was adopted as the name of the community. Waldie Brothers in turn sold the mill to McFadden and Malloy in 1913.

Over time a small village with a school, hotel, barbershop, general store was created, and by 1926 the community had a population of about 300 people. Sawmill activity was terminated in Spragge in the early 1930s following a disastrous fire, which eliminated the mill, lumber inventory, docks and most of the town. The town subsequently revived with the discovery of uranium and copper deposits in the area, leading to a thriving mining industry.

== Demographics ==
In the 2021 Census of Population conducted by Statistics Canada, The North Shore had a population of 531 living in 249 of its 365 total private dwellings, a change of 6.8% from its 2016 population of 497. With a land area of 230.17 km^{2} (88.87 sq mi), it had a population density of 2.3/km^{2} (6.0/sq mi) in 2021.

Canada census – The North Shore, Ontario community profile

	2021	2016	2011
Population	531 (+6.8% from 2016)	497 (-2.4% from 2011)	509 (-7.3% from 2006)
Land area	230.17 km^{2} (88.87 sq mi)	239.08 km^{2} (92.31 sq mi)	238.94 km^{2} (92.26 sq mi)
Population density	2.3/km^{2} (6.0/sq mi)	2.1/km^{2} (5.4/sq mi)	2.1/km^{2} (5.4/sq mi)
Median age	60.4 (M: 60.8, F: 60.0)	59.9 (M: 60.8, F: 58.7)	56.2 (M: 56.8, F: 55.9)
Private dwellings	365 (total) 249 (occupied)	367 (total) 238 (occupied)	370 (total)
Median household income	$69,000	$61,440

References: 2021 2016 2011

Historical census populations – The North Shore, Ontario

Year	Pop.	±%
1976	2,062	—
1981	2,039	−1.1%
1986	863	−57.7%
1991	729	−15.5%
1996	678	−7.0%

Year	Pop.	±%
2001	544	−19.8%
2006	549	+0.9%
2011	509	−7.3%
2016	497	−2.4%
2021	531	+6.8%

Population counts are not adjusted for boundary changes.
Source: Statistics Canada

== Images ==
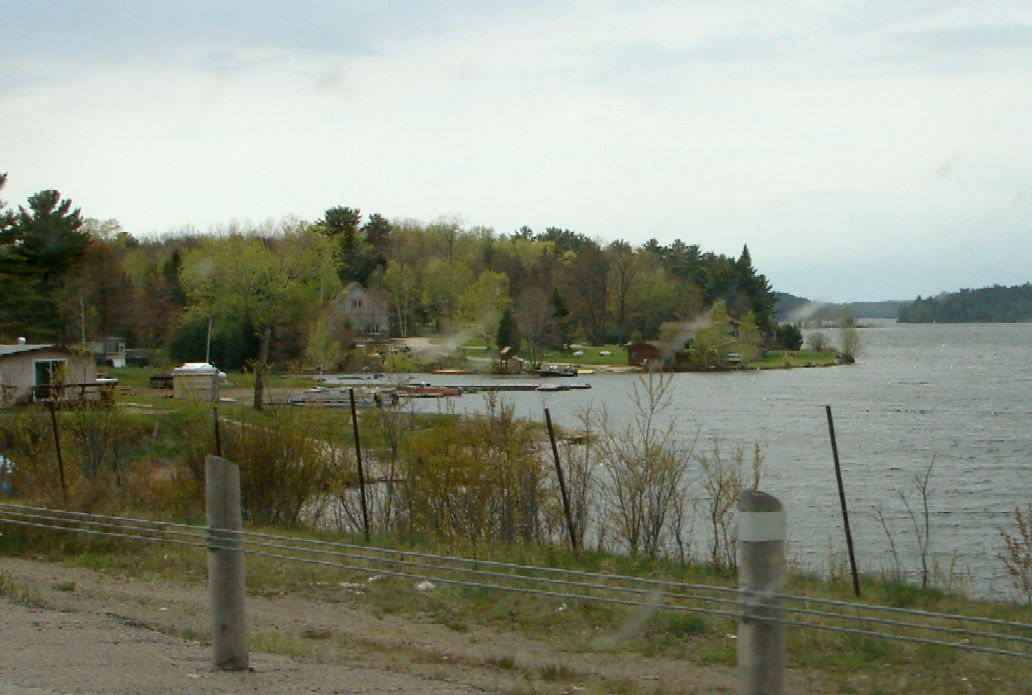
Algoma Mills and Lauzon Lake

Turn of the century view of the main street in Moiles Mills

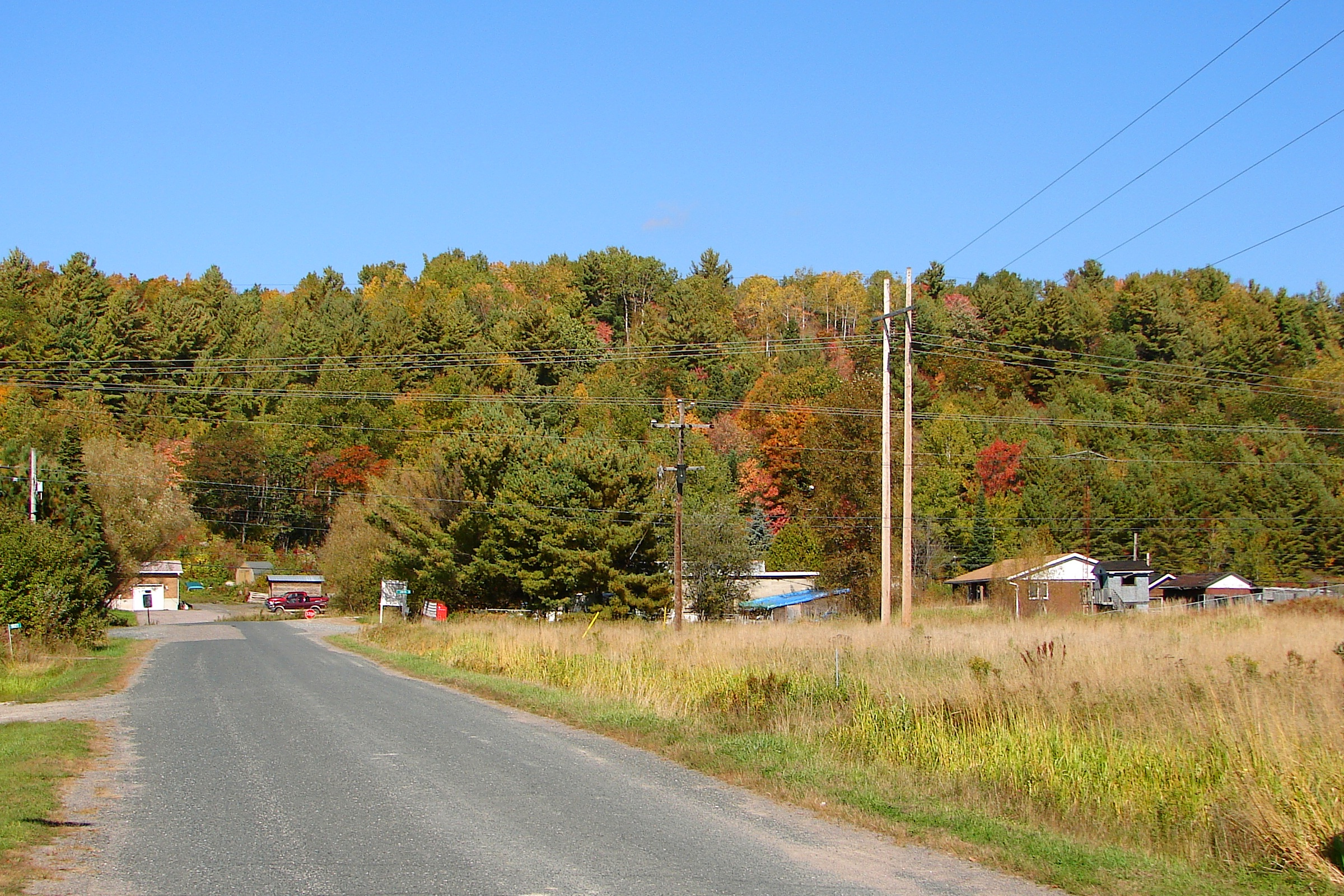
Serpent River

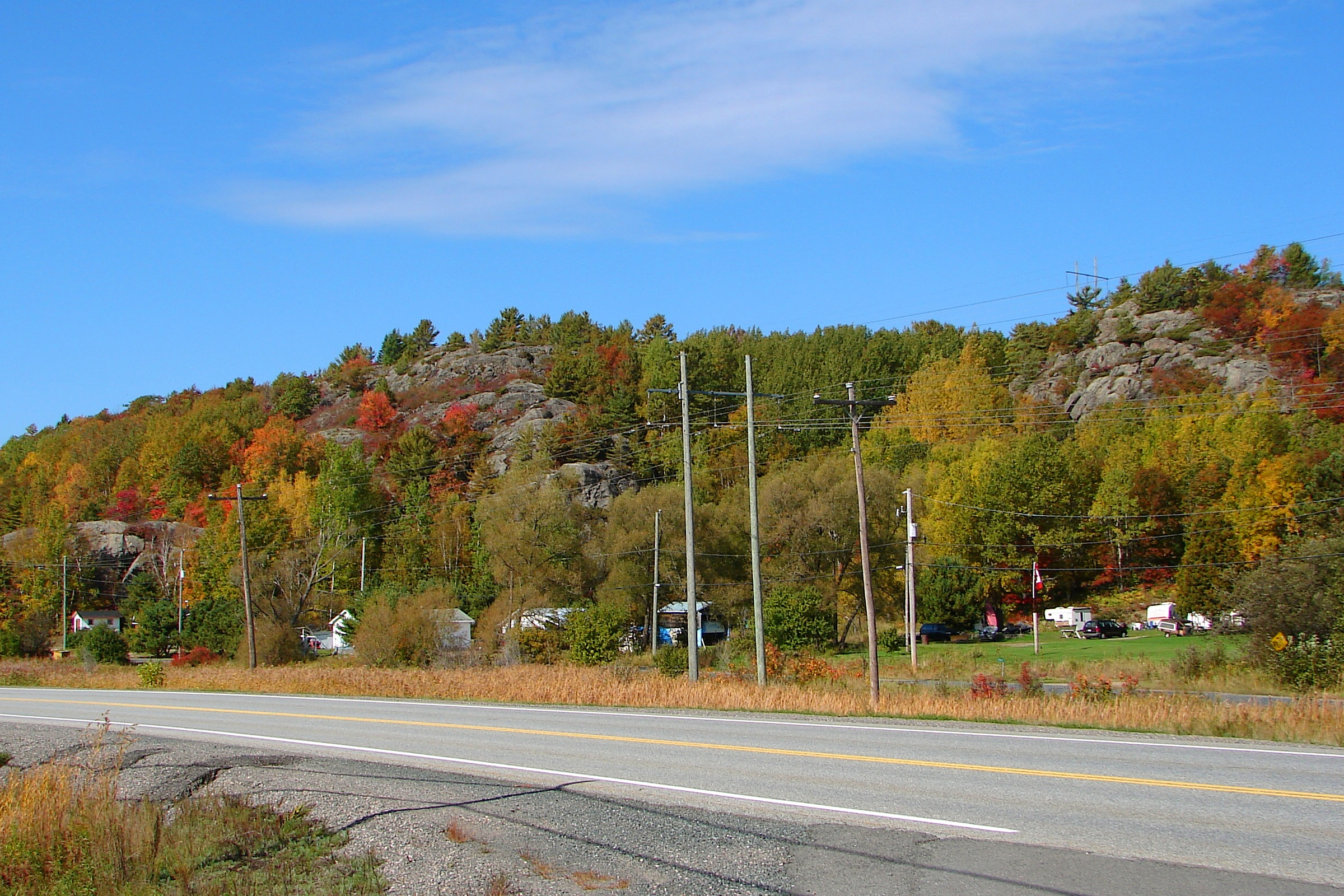
Spragge

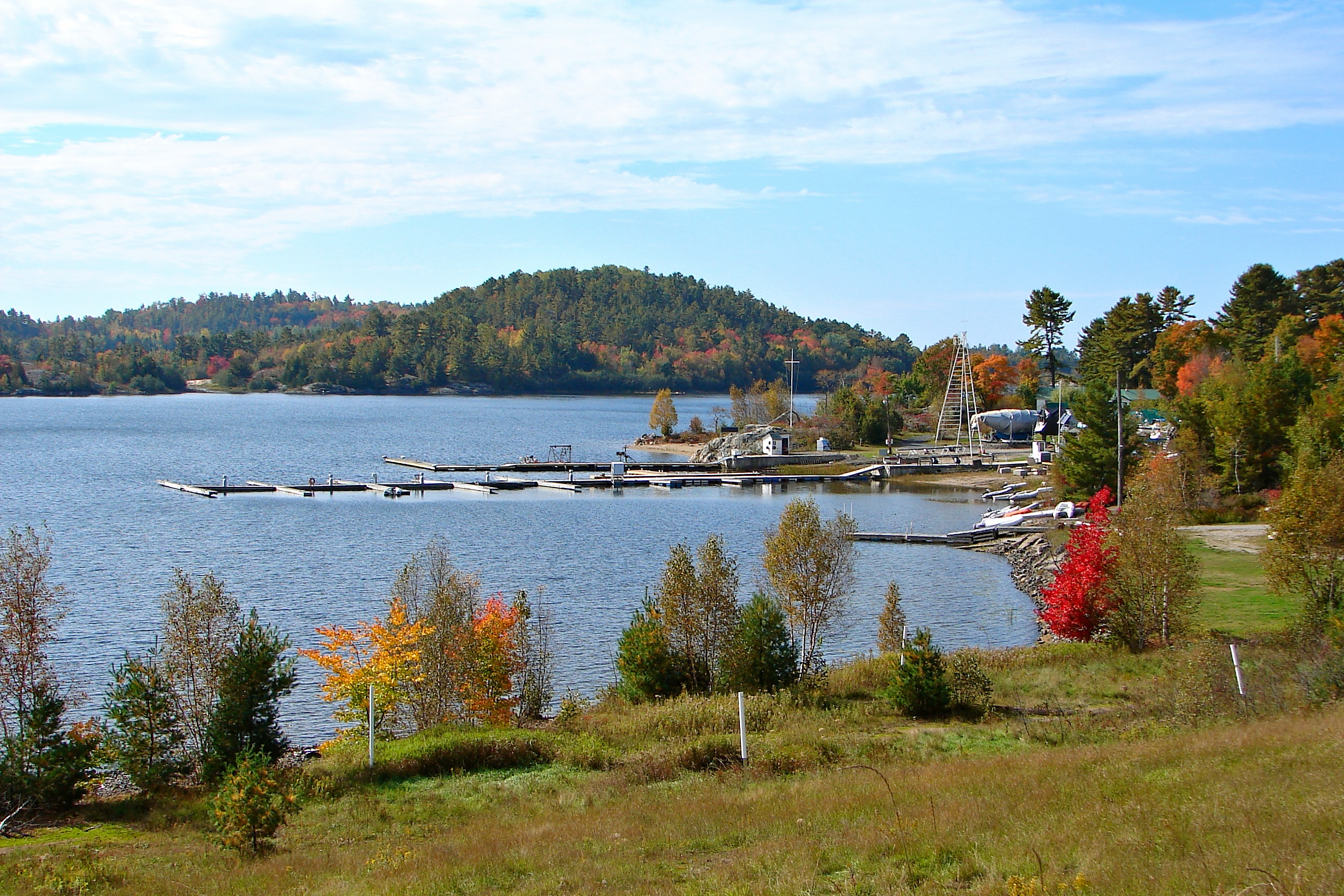
Marina in Spragge

== See also ==
- List of townships in Ontario
- List of francophone communities in Ontario
