= Algoma District =

Algoma District District d'Algoma
- District
- Location of Algoma District in Ontario
- Coordinates: 48°00′N 84°30′W
- Country: Canada
- Province: Ontario
- Region: Northeastern Ontario
- Created: 1858

Area
  - Land: 48,814.88 km^{2} (18,847.53 sq mi)

Population (2021)
  - Total: 113,777
  - Density: 2.4/km^{2} (6.2/sq mi)
- Time zone: UTC-5 (EST)
  - Summer (DST): UTC-4 (EDT)
- Area code: 705
- Seat: Sault Ste. Marie

Algoma District is a district and census division in Northeastern Ontario in the Canadian province of Ontario.

The name was created by an American ethnologist, Henry Rowe Schoolcraft (1793–1864), who was appointed Indian agent to the Ojibwe in Sault Ste. Marie region in 1822. "Al" is derived from Algonquin, while "goma" is a variant of gomee, meaning lake or water.

Algoma District has shoreline along Lake Superior and Lake Huron. It has an international border crossing to the American state of Michigan, at Sault Ste. Marie. Historically, it was known for its lumber and mining industries.

The rugged scenery of the region has inspired works by Canadian artists, particularly the Group of Seven. They rented a boxcar from the Algoma Central Railway to travel on excursions through this region.

== History ==
Surviving prehistoric remains in Algoma District are concentrated around waterways. These remains date as far back as the Archaic period. There are also sites from the later Woodland period, with evidence of extensive Late Woodland habitation. Ceramics at Late Woodland sites show predominantly southeastern links, having originated from the Huron–Petun complex (broadly Ontario Iroquoian) as well as from modern-day Michigan.

French explorers arrived in the area by the mid-17th century. As the French penetrated into North America, they established lines of forts and trading posts, often at river mouths to control trade, especially the lucrative fur trade. In Algoma, they established Fort Michipicoten, located at the mouth of the Michipicoten River where it empties into Lake Superior. The Michipicoten was one of the geographic features depicted by Samuel de Champlain on a 1632 map. This helped the French bridge the distance to Fort Kaministiquia at the head of Lake Superior, and protected the route up the Michipicoten to James Bay, providing a significant crossroads of water routes.

=== Administrative history ===
Algoma was created by proclamation as a provisional judicial district of the Province of Canada, effective October 1859, This was authorized under an act passed by the Legislative Assembly of the Province of Canada in 1857. The limits of the district were more specifically described thus:

Commencing on the north shore of the Georgian Bay, of Lake Huron, at the most westerly mouth of French River;

thence due north to the northerly limit of the Province;

thence along the said northerly limit of the Province, westerly to the westerly limit thereof;

thence along the said westerly limit of the Province, southerly to the southerly limit thereof;

thence along the said southerly limit of the Province to a point in Lake Huron, opposite to the southerly extremity of the Great Manitoulin Island;

thence easterly and north-easterly so as to include all the islands in Lake Huron not within the settled limits of any County or District to the place of beginning.

The district seat is Sault Ste. Marie, Ontario. However, it is noted that Thessalon is where the Algoma District Services Administration Board is located.

As the population grew and the northern and northwestern boundaries of Ontario were determined by the Judicial Committee of the Privy Council, Algoma shrank. Other districts were created from it by the provincial government of Ontario:

- Thunder Bay District in 1871
- Manitoulin District in 1888
- Sudbury District in 1894
- Timiskaming District in 1912

== Geography ==
=== Rivers ===
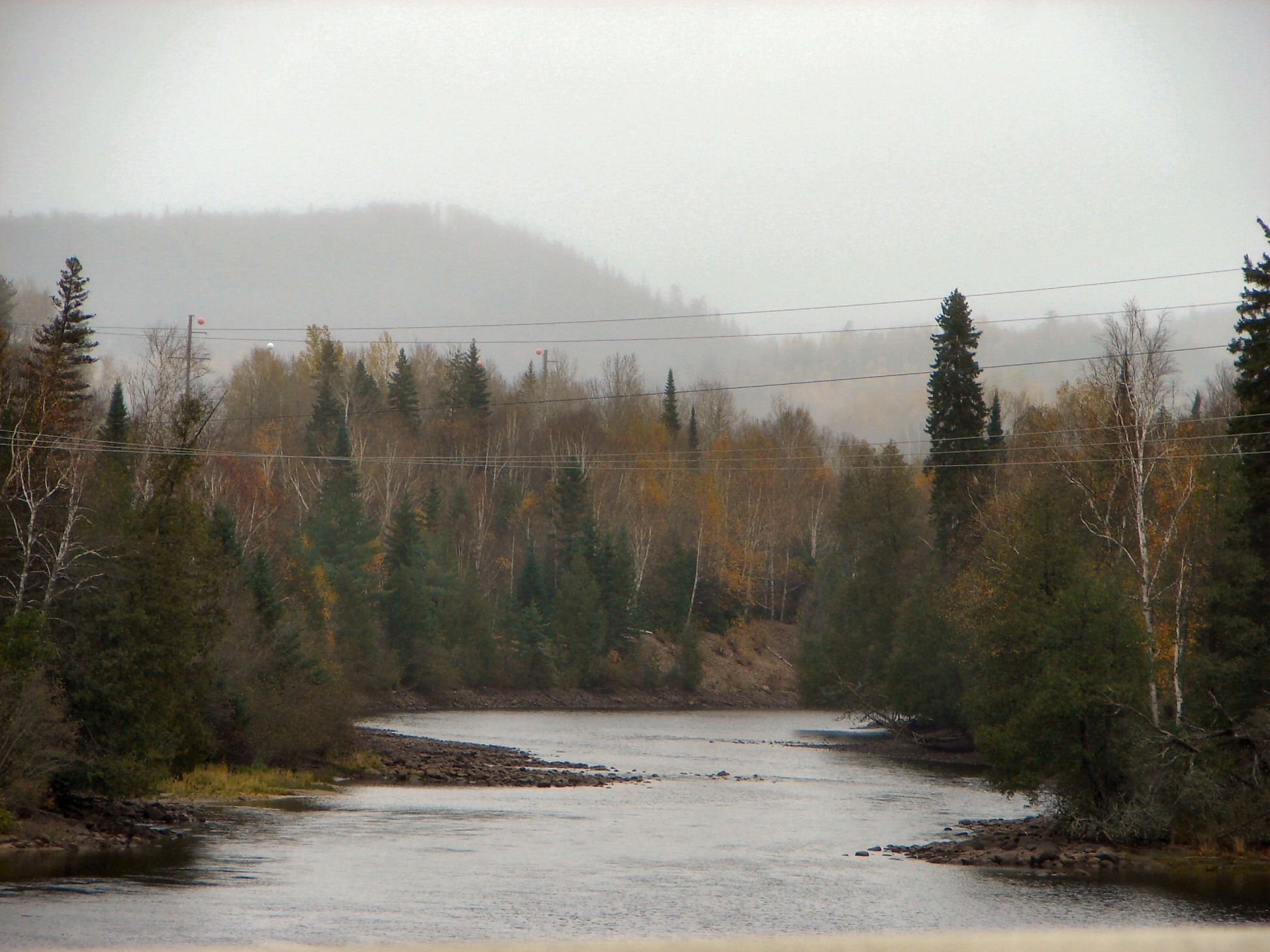
The Michipicoten River

Algoma District is crossed by a number of rivers, which historically were used as transportation and trade corridors. The Hudson's Bay Company chose key riverside or river mouth locations for a number of its trading posts in the district. One example was Fort Michipicoten, located at the Michipicoten River's mouth. The rivers flow in a number of directions, some crossing through other districts to ultimately empty into faraway water bodies such as James Bay. Others drain into the Great Lakes Basin via Lake Huron or Lake Superior.

Major rivers in Algoma District include:

- Batchawana River (empties into Batchawana Bay on Lake Superior)
- Michipicoten River (empties into Michipicoten Bay on Lake Superior)
- Missinaibi River (originates at Missinaibi Lake and empties into the Moose River, then ultimately into James Bay)
- Mississagi River (originates in Sudbury District and flows into Lake Huron)
- Montreal River (empties into Lake Superior via a series of hydroelectric dams)
- Kapuskasing River (begins at Kapuskasing Lake and flows northward to James Bay)

=== Forests ===
In the Algoma section, the characteristic forest mixture consists of yellow birch, white spruce, balsam fir, sugar maple, hop-hornbeam, and eastern white cedar. Eastern white pine and occasional red pine (Pinus resinosa) dominate on the upper, steep south-facing slopes; white spruce, eastern white cedar, and balsam fir occupy the middle and lower slopes. A white spruce–balsam fir association, which usually includes white birch and black spruce, is prominent on the river terraces and adjoining flats in the northern part of the Section (Rowe 1972).

== Subdivisions ==
Communities within these subdivisions are added in parentheses.

=== Cities ===
Name of City	Population	Ref.
Elliot Lake	10,743	
Sault Ste. Marie	73,368	

=== Towns ===
Name of Town	Population	Ref.
Blind River	3,472	
Bruce Mines	566	
Spanish	696	
Thessalon	1,279	

=== Townships ===
Name of Township	Population	Ref.
Dubreuilville	635	
Hilton	261	
Hornepayne	1,050	
Huron Shores (Iron Bridge, Sowerby, Little Rapids, Dean Lake)	1,723	
Jocelyn (Kentvale)	237	
Johnson (Desbarats)	750	
Laird	1,057	
Macdonald, Meredith and Aberdeen Additional (Echo Bay, Bar River, Sylvan Valley)	1,609	
The North Shore (Spragge, Serpent River, Algoma Mills)	509	
Plummer Additional	650	
Prince	1,031	
St. Joseph (Richard's Landing)	1,240	
Tarbutt	396	
Wawa (Michipicoten, Michipicoten River)	2,975	
White River	607	

=== Village ===
Name of Village	Population	Ref.
Hilton Beach	145	

=== Reserves ===
Name of Reserve	Population	Ref.
Garden River 14	1,170	
Goulais Bay 15A	82	
Gros Cap 49	68	
Gros Cap Indian Village 49A	N/A	
Missanabie 62	N/A	
Mississauga First Nation#8	390	
Obadjiwan 15E	N/A	
Rankin Location 15D	566	
Sagamok	1,036	
Serpent River 7	373	
Thessalon 12	108	
Whitefish Island	N/A	

=== Unorganized areas ===
- North Part (incl. local services boards of Aweres, Batchawana Bay, Goulais and District, Hawk Junction, Missanabie, Peace Tree, Searchmont and Wharncliffe and Kynoch)
- South East Part

== Demographics ==
As a census division in the 2021 Census of Population conducted by Statistics Canada, the Algoma District had a population of 113,777 living in 51,709 of its 59,854 total private dwellings, a change of −0.3% from its 2016 population of 114,094. With a land area of 48,281.36 km^{2} (18,641.54 sq mi), it had a population density of 2.4/km^{2} (6.1/sq mi) in 2021.

Canada census – Algoma community profile

	2021	2016	2011
Population	113,777 (-0.3% from 2016)	114094 (−1.5% from 2011)	115870 (−1.4% from 2006)
Land area	48,281.36 km^{2} (18,641.54 sq mi)	48,814.88 km^{2} (18,847.53 sq mi)	48,810.68 km^{2} (18,845.91 sq mi)
Population density	2.4/km^{2} (6.2/sq mi)	2.3/km^{2} (6.0/sq mi)	2.4/km^{2} (6.2/sq mi)
Median age	50.0 (M: 48.4, F: 51.2)
Private dwellings	59,854 (total) 51,709 (occupied)	60,324 (total)	59,149 (total)
Median household income	$70,000

Notes: Excludes census data for one or more incompletely enumerated Indian reserves.
References: 2021 2016 2011

== Highways ==
=== King's Highways ===
- #17
- #101
- #108
- #129

=== Secondary highways ===
- #519
- #532
- #538
- #546
- #547
- #548
- #550
- #552
- #553
- #554
- #556
- #557
- #563
- #565
- #631
- #638
- #639
- #651
- #670

=== Tertiary highways ===
- #821

== Protected areas ==
- Algoma Headwaters Provincial Park
- Aubinadong River Provincial Park
- Aubrey Falls Provincial Park
- Batchawana Bay Provincial Park
- Batchawana River Provincial Park
- Chapleau Crown Game Preserve
- Chapleau-Nemegosenda River Provincial Park
- Delta Provincial Nature Reserve
- Fort Creek Conservation Area
- Goulais River Provincial Park
- Hiawatha Highlands Conservation Area
- La Cloche Provincial Park
- Lake Superior Provincial Park
- Little White River Provincial Park
- Marks Bay Conservation Area
- Matintenda Provincial Park
- Michipicoten Post Provincial Park
- Missinaibi Provincial Park
- Mississagi Provincial Park
- Mississagi River Provincial Park
- Montreal River Provincial Park
- Nagagami Lake Provincial Park
- Nagagamisis Provincial Park
- Nemegosenda River Wetlands Provincial Park
- North Channel Islands-La Cloche Provincial Park
- North Shore Waterwat Provincial Park
- Obatanga Provincial Park
- Pancake Bay Provincial Park
- Pichogen River Provincial Nature Reserve
- Pokei Lake-White River Wetlands Provivncial Nature Reserve
- Potholes Provincial Nature Reserve
- Pukaskwa National Park
- River aux Sables Provincial Park
- Sandy Islands Provincial Nature Reserve
- Sayme-Aubinadong-Gong Provincial Park
- St. Joseph's Island National Marine Bird Sanctuary
- Wenebegon River Provincial Park

== Attractions ==
- Algoma Central Railway - Agawa Canyon (Algoma, Unorganized, North Part)
- Algoma University (Sault Ste. Marie)
- Fire Tower Lookout (Elliot Lake)
- Fort St. Joseph National Historic Site (St. Joseph)
- High Falls of the Michipicoten River (Wawa)
- Mount Dufour Ski Resort (Elliot Lake)
- Sault Ste. Marie Airport (Sault Ste. Marie)
- Sault Ste. Marie Canal (Sault Ste. Marie)
- Sault College (Sault Ste. Marie)
- Searchmont Ski Area
- Stone Ridge Golf Resort (Elliot Lake)
- Crimson Ridge Golf Course
- Batchawana Bay Provincial Park
- Hub Trail (hiking, bicycling, and cross-country ski trail through Sault Ste. Marie)
- Rocking On The River (Wandering-Elk Promotion & Productions), Concert Venue @ 135 Royer Rd., Blind River.
- Canadian Bushplane Heritage Centre https://bushplane.com/ (Aeronautical museum located at 50 Pim Street on the waterfront in downtown Sault Ste. Marie)

== See also ==
- List of townships in Ontario
- List of secondary schools in Ontario
