= Aweres =

Local services board in Ontario, Canada

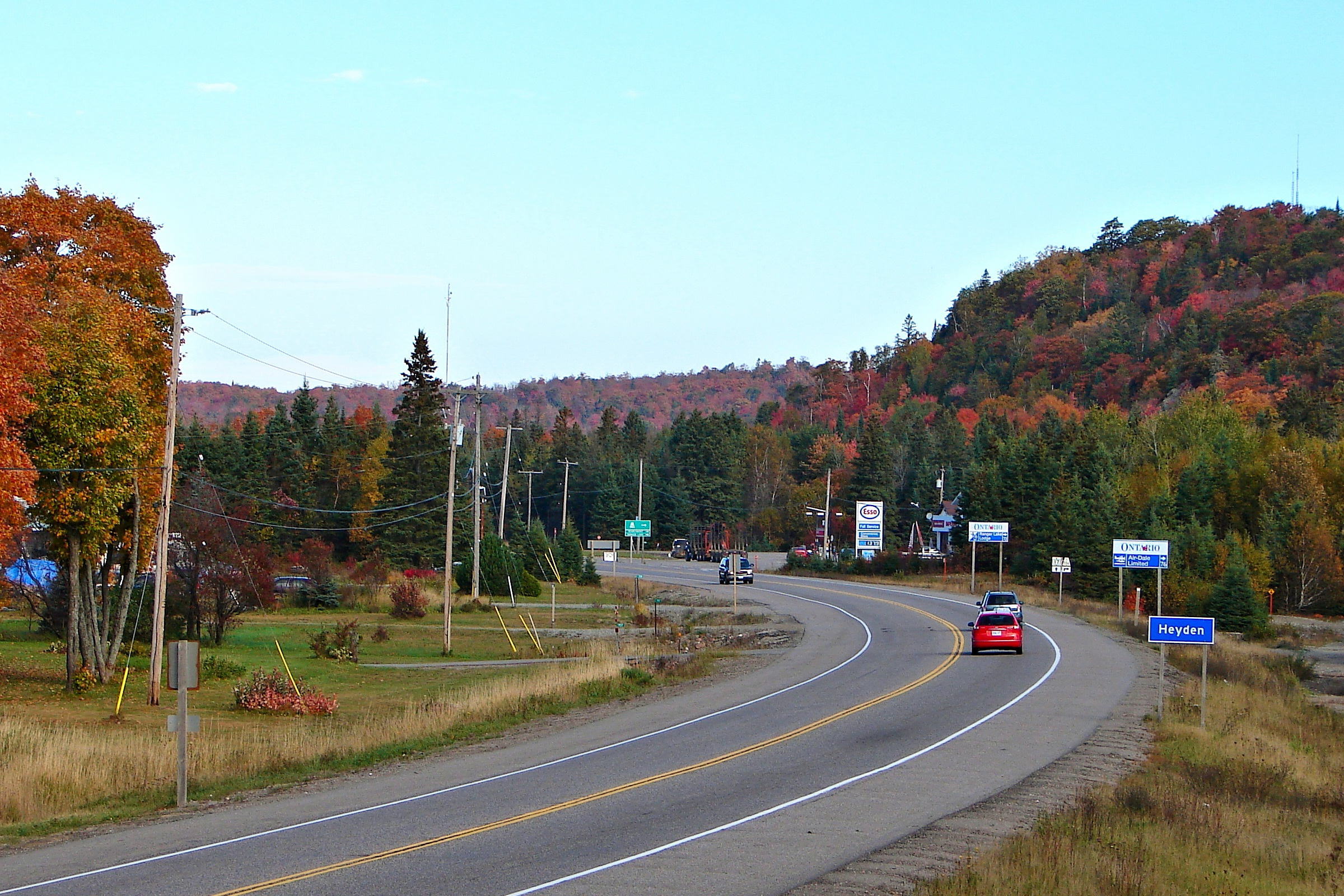
Heyden along highway 17

Aweres is a local services board in the Canadian province of Ontario. Located in the Algoma District, it encompasses and provides services to most of the geographic township of Aweres, including the communities of Island Lake and Heyden.

The area northwest of Heyden is administered by the separate local services board of Peace Tree.

== Heyden ==
Heyden (46°38′30″N 84°18′30″W) is located about 14 km (8.7 mi) north of Sault Ste. Marie at the intersection of Highway 17 and Highway 556.

Heyden had one elementary school, Aweres Public School, which opened in 1963. The school was closed at the end of the 2014 school year. The school was a medium-sized (2,407 square metres or 25,910 square feet), single-storey building that served students from both Heyden and Searchmont. Students are now bused into Sault Ste Marie.
