= Ontario Highway 129 =

Ontario provincial highway

Highway 129
- Highway 129 highlighted in red

Route information
- Maintained by the Ministry of Transportation of Ontario
- Length: 220.7 km (137.1 mi)
- History: Established 1956; Extended February 27, 1957

Major junctions
- South end: Highway 17 in Thessalon
- Highway 554 near Wharncliffe; Highway 556 near Aubrey Falls Provincial Park; Highway 667 near Five Mile Lake Provincial Park; Highway 101
- North end: Chapleau south limits

Location
- Country: Canada
- Province: Ontario

Highway system
- Ontario provincial highways; Current; Former; 400-series
← Highway 127	→ Highway 130
Former provincial highways
← Highway 128

King's Highway 129, commonly referred to as Highway 129, is a provincially maintained highway in the Canadian province of Ontario. Located in the Algoma and Sudbury districts, the highway extends for 221 kilometres (137 mi) from a junction with Highway 17 in Thessalon to the town of Chapleau, just north of Highway 101. The route is isolated and lightly travelled throughout its length; while providing access to several remote settlements, the only sizable communities along the route are the two termini. The highway was established in 1956 along the Chapleau Road. From the early 1960s to mid-1970s, Highway 129 was designated as the Chapleau Route of the Trans-Canada Highway.

== Route description ==
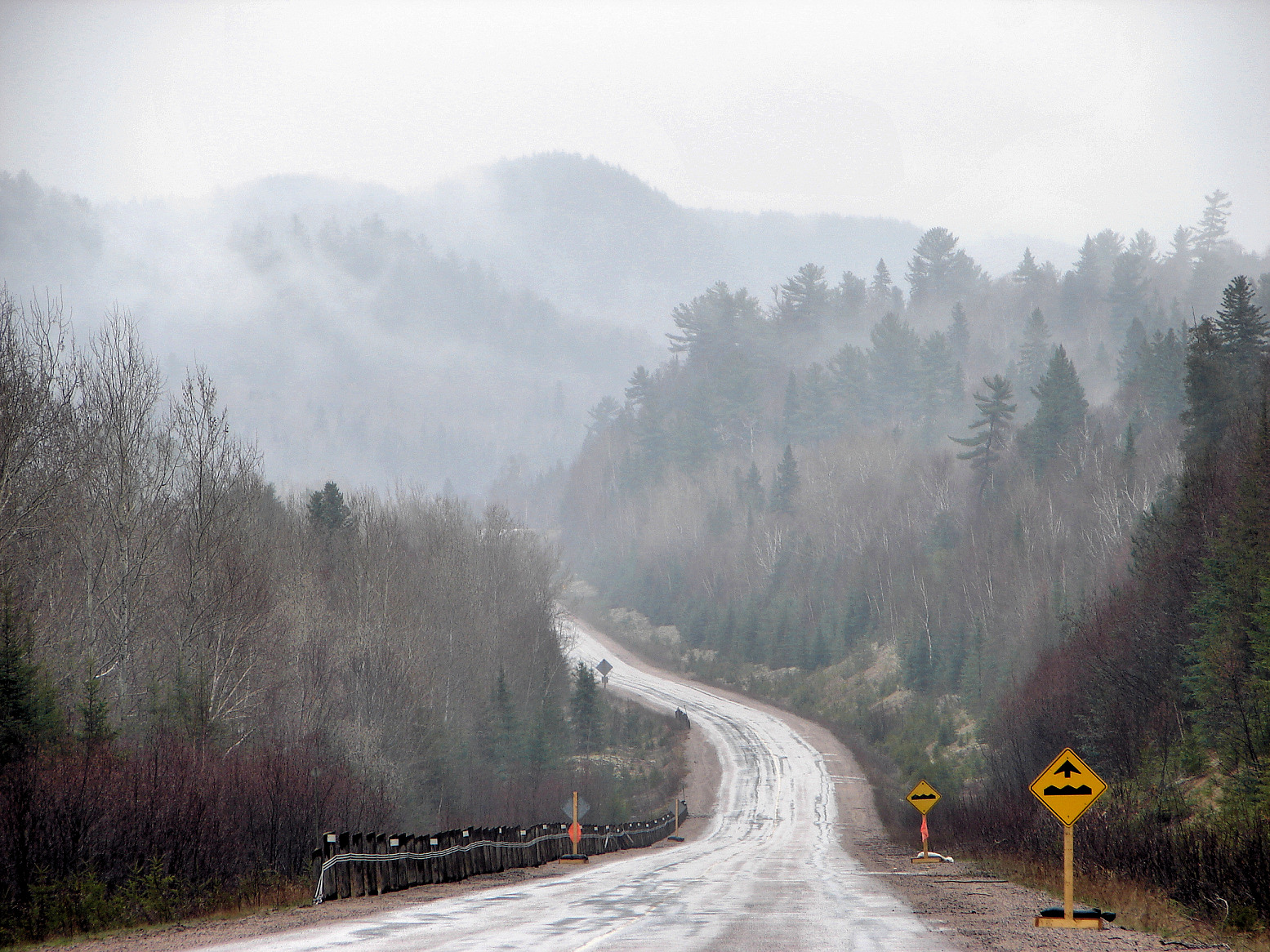
Several sections of Highway 129 feature grades and sightlines that are below King's Highway standards

Highway 129 is one of the most isolated in Ontario and among the least used of the King's Highways. Although the highway is an important access route for several isolated communities, including Little Rapids, Sultan, Kormak and Nemegos, as well as provincial parks such as Aubrey Falls, Five Mile Lake and Wakami Lake, the only community located directly on the highway's route between its termini is Wharncliffe. There are very few services along Highway 129. Tunnel Lake Trading Post and Aubrey Falls Trading Post & Resort offer some basic goods, fuel and lodging for travellers and local residents (albeit with limited hours).

The route begins in the town of Thessalon at Highway 17, north of Lake Huron. It travels northeast through the Municipality of Huron Shores, passing the Thessalon Township Heritage Museum southeast of Little Rapids. Wedging between Basswood Lake and the Byrnes Lake White Birch Provincial Conservation Reserve, it enters the unorganized portions of Algoma District. It passes through Wharncliffe, crosses the Mississagi River and encounters Highway 554, which travels east to Kynoch.

North of Highway 554, the route is generally parallel to the river and Mississagi River Provincial Park. After passing west of Wakomata Lake on its journey through completely undeveloped forest and muskeg, it reaches a junction with Highway 556 southwest of Aubrey Falls Provincial Park. Thereafter, the highway roughly follows the Wenebegon River through Wenebegon River Provincial Park to Wenebegon Lake. Highway 129 encounters the entrance to Five Mile Provincial Park and meets Highway 667, which travels east through Sultan, becoming the Sultan Industrial Road and connecting with Highway 144.

From this junction, the route travels northwest towards Highway 101, where drivers must turn right to continue north on the route. Both highways travel concurrently northeast for 7.6 kilometres (4.7 mi), at which point Highway 101 branches off to the east. Highway 129 continues north alongside the Sudbury–White River CPR line. It ends at the southern town limits of Chapleau, continuing north as a local road through the town and into the Chapleau Crown Game Preserve, the largest game preserve in the world.

== History ==
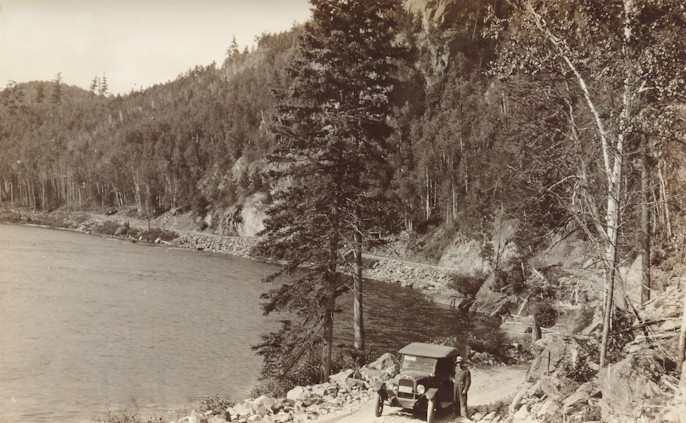
A road was extended north along the Mississagi River in the 1920s; modern vehicles would be hard-pressed to navigate the narrow and winding route

Highway 129 was first designated between Aubrey Falls and Chapleau in 1956, following the Thessalon–Chapleau Highway, a dirt road along the banks of the Mississagi River that opened to traffic on January 28, 1949. Though opened, this initial road was almost impassable, and certainly dangerous. Despite this, it quickly gained notoriety for its breathtaking scenery and seemingly limitless hunting and fishing potential. However, the poor condition of the road often left a terrible impression on tourists. John Austin Moore described his voyage up the road during the summer of 1951:

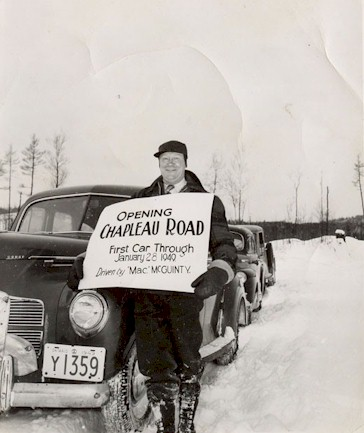
On January 28, 1949, the Chapleau Road was completed, opening a community previously accessible only by plane

"Our first trip by car took us over the famed Chapleau Road, the scenery and unique loneliness of which have been often reported in magazines. And surely its condition not long after it had opened to travel, when we first drove it in June 1951, was unforgettable. One trip over its 145 miles was almost guaranteed to shorten your life"

The route was extended south on February 27, 1957, absorbing the entire length of Highway 559, itself designated in 1956. The Highway 559 designation has since been reused in Parry Sound District. In 1961, the partially gravel surfaced highway was designated as the Chapleau Route of the Trans-Canada Highway, despite being only a spur in the network at that time. This designation lasted until as early as 1974 and as late as 1978.

Highway 129 was the last King's Highway to be paved; the section immediately south of Aubrey Falls remained a gravel road as late as 1982. The one-lane Rapid River Bridge was replaced by an adjacent two-lane bridge in the second quarter of 2010.

== Major intersections ==
The following table lists the major junctions along Highway 129, as noted by the Ministry of Transportation of Ontario.

Division	Location	km	mi	Destinations	Notes
Algoma	Thessalon	0.0	0.0	River Street Highway 17 / TCH – Sault Ste. Marie, Sudbury	Highway 129 southern terminus; River Street formerly Highway 17B west
Algoma	Unorganized North Algoma	30.8	19.1	Highway 554 east to Highway 546 – Iron Bridge	
Algoma	Unorganized North Algoma	96.6	60.0	Highway 556 west – Ranger Lake, Searchmont, Heyden	
Sudbury	Unorganized North Sudbury	189.7	117.9	Highway 667 east – Sultan	
Sudbury	Unorganized North Sudbury	210.1	130.6	Highway 101 west – Wawa	Southern end of Highway 101 concurrency
Sudbury	Chapleau 74A	217.7	135.3	Highway 101 east – Timmins	Northern end of Highway 101 concurrency
Sudbury	Chapleau	220.7	137.1	Chapleau town limits	Highway 129 northern terminus
1.000 mi = 1.609 km; 1.000 km = 0.621 mi: Concurrency terminus
