= Frith Lake (Sudbury District) =

- lac Frith
- Location in Ontario
- Location: Sudbury District, Ontario
- Coordinates: 47°35′12″N 81°16′06″W
- Type: Lake
- Part of: Saint Lawrence River drainage basin
- Primary inflows: unnamed creek
- Primary outflows: unnamed creek
- Basin countries: Canada
- Max. length: 700 metres (2,300 ft)
- Max. width: 400 metres (1,300 ft)
- Surface elevation: 375 metres (1,230 ft)

Frith Lake (French: lac Frith) is lake in geographic Churchill Township the Unorganized North Part of Sudbury District in northeastern Ontario, Canada. The lake is in the Saint Lawrence River drainage basin.

== Hydrology ==
The lake is 700 metres (2,300 ft) long and 400 metres (1,300 ft) wide, and lies at an elevation of 375 metres (1,230 ft). The nearest community is Shining Tree, on Ontario Highway 560, 2.8 kilometres (1.7 mi) to the south.

There is one unnamed inflow, arriving at the east from Speed Lake. The primary outflow is an unnamed creek at the north that flows north to West Shining Tree Lake, and then via West Shining Tree Creek, the West Montreal River, the Montreal River and the Ottawa River to the Saint Lawrence River.
