= Kukatush, Ontario =

Dispersed rural community in Sudbury District, Ontario, Canada

Coordinates: 48°07′48″N 82°12′06″W

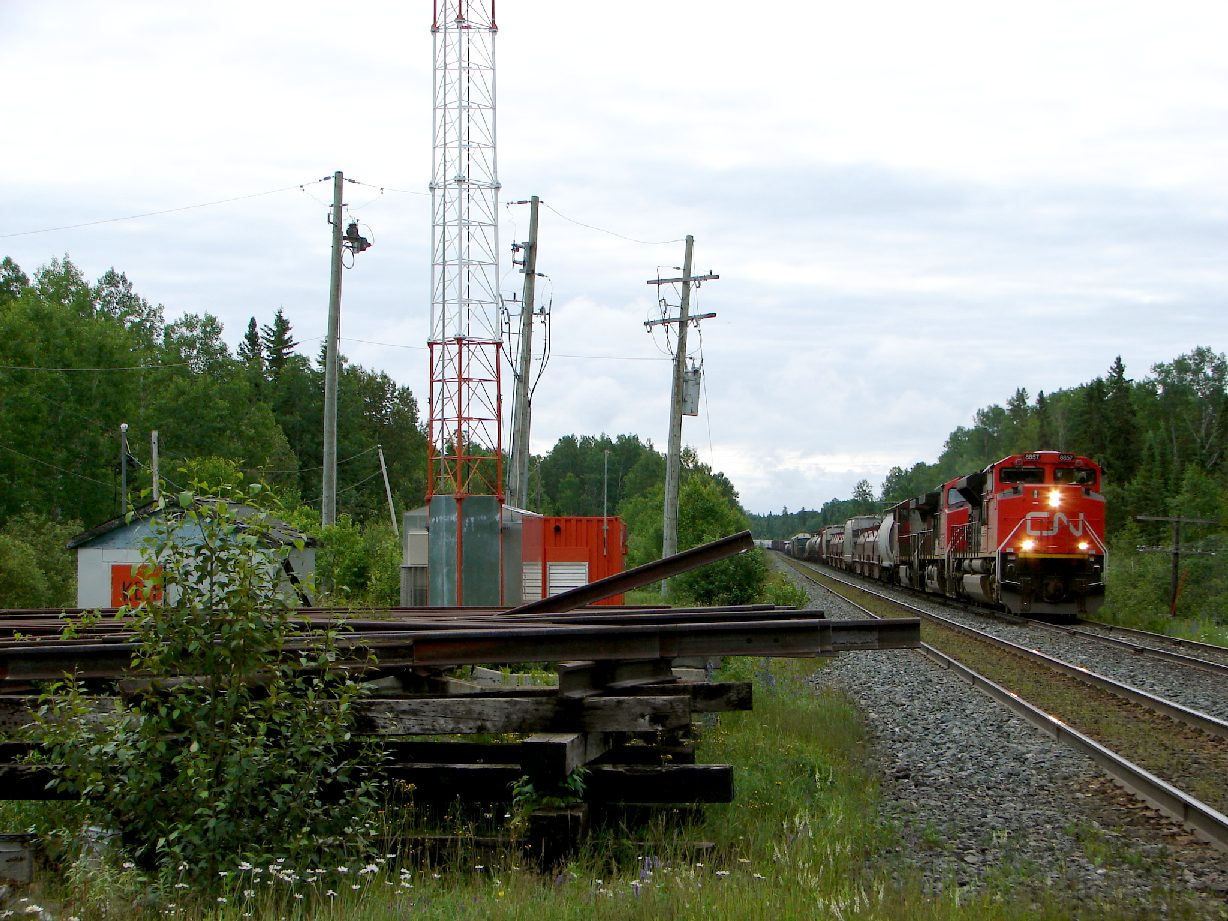
Kukatush siding

Kukatush is a rail siding and ghost town in Unorganized North Part of Sudbury District, Township of Penhorwood, Ontario, Canada. It is located approximately 60 kilometres (37 mi) west of Timmins (via Highway 101). The elevation is 349 metres (1,145 ft). Kukatush means groundhog in Anishinaabemowin.

The main reason for its existence has been the presence of the Canadian National Railway siding. Only a few buildings associated with the railway remain, and the area is no longer populated. However, the area has a varied history of fur trading, railway activities, mining exploration, which took place from as early as 1903 until the Kukatush Mining Corporation in the 1950s-60s, logging operations, etc. At one time there was even a basic landing strip for small aircraft arriving for local tourist outfitters camps.

== History ==
The Canadian Northern Railway (CNoR) was built from Capreol to Westree in 1913, Gogama by 1914, and through the whistle-stop of Kukatush to Foleyet by June 1915. Kukatush mining extracted iron in the 1950s and 1960s.

=== Consolidation ===
On December 20, 1918, the Canadian National Railways (CNR) was founded, consolidating the railroad with the Intercolonial Railway of Canada, National Transcontinental Railway, Prince Edward Island Railway, and Hudson Bay Railway within the Canadian Government Railways (CGR) that was established in 1915.

=== School car program ===
The School car program, referred to as "school on wheels", a joint venture between the CNR and the Canadian Department of Education that began in 1926, provided mobile railway classrooms. A rail siding was provided at mile marker 133 and was used until the Department of Education suspended the program at Kukatush. On April 25, 1963, CNR issued a retirement plan for the 220.5 feet (67.2 m) of siding.
