= Kinogama, Ontario =

Kinogama
- Etymology: Named for the Kinogama River
- Location of Kinogama in Ontario
- Coordinates: 47°38′43″N 83°00′58″W
- Country: Canada
- Province: Ontario
- Region: Northeastern Ontario
- District: Sudbury
- Part: Sudbury, Unorganized, North
- Elevation: 430 m (1,410 ft)
- Time zone: UTC-5 (Eastern Time Zone)
  - Summer (DST): UTC-4 (Eastern Time Zone)
- Postal code FSA: P0M
- Area codes: 705, 249

Kinogama is an unincorporated place and railway point in the geographic de Gaulle Township in the Unorganized North Part of Sudbury District in Northeastern Ontario, Canada. It is on a left tributary creek just west of the Kinogama River in the James Bay drainage basin.

Kinogama is on the Canadian Pacific Railway transcontinental main line, between the railway point of Tophet to the west and the community of Kormak to the east. Kinogama railway station is located on this line and is served by the Via Rail Sudbury – White River train.
