= Stupart, Ontario =

Stupart
- Location in Ontario
- Coordinates: 47°20′51″N 81°32′40″W
- Country: Canada
- Province: Ontario
- District: Sudbury
- Part: Sudbury, Unorganized, North
- Established: 1912
- Elevation: 398 m (1,306 ft)
- Time zone: UTC-5 (Eastern Time Zone)
  - Summer (DST): UTC-4 (Eastern Time Zone)
- Postal Code: P0M
- Area codes: 705,249

Stupart is an unincorporated place and railway point in geographic Hennessy Township in the Unorganized North Part of Sudbury District in Northeastern Ontario, Canada. The community is just off Deschênes Lake in the Opikinimika River system, part of the James Bay drainage basin.

Stupart is on the Canadian National Railway transcontinental main line, and is passed but not served by Via Rail Canadian trains. The next community eastbound is Ruel, served by Ruel railway station; the next community westbound is Westree on Ontario Highway 560A, served by Westree railway station.
