= Lapalmes, Ontario =

Lapalmes
- Unincorporated place Railway point
- Location in Ontario
- Coordinates: 47°13′44″N 81°25′12″W
- Country: Canada
- Province: Ontario
- District: Sudbury
- Part: Sudbury, Unorganized, North
- Established: 1912
- Elevation: 410 m (1,350 ft)
- Time zone: UTC-5 (Eastern Time Zone)
  - Summer (DST): UTC-4 (Eastern Time Zone)
- Postal Code: P0M
- Area codes: 705, 249

Lapalmes (formerly Lapalmes Spur) is an unincorporated place and railway point in geographic Marshay Township in the Unorganized North Part of Sudbury District in Northeastern Ontario, Canada. The community is on Pazhig Lake in the Wanapitei River system, part of the Great Lakes Basin.

Lapalmes is on the Canadian National Railway transcontinental main line, has a passing siding, and is passed but not served by Via Rail Canadian trains. The next community eastbound is Felix, served by Felix railway station; the next community westbound is Ruel, served by Ruel railway station.
