= Ontario Highway 667 =

Ontario provincial highway

Highway 667

Route information
- Maintained by Ministry of Transportation of Ontario
- Length: 35.3 km (21.9 mi)
- Existed: 1977–present

Major junctions
- West end: Highway 129
- East end: Main Street in Sultan (continues as Sultan Industrial Road)

Location
- Country: Canada
- Province: Ontario
- Districts: Sudbury District

Highway system
- Ontario provincial highways; Current; Former; 400-series
← Highway 666	→ Highway 668

Secondary Highway 667, commonly referred to as Highway 667, is a provincially maintained secondary highway located in the Sudbury District of the Canadian province of Ontario. Roughly 35 kilometres (22 mi) in length, the route connects Highway 129 to the town of Sultan and to Wakami Lake Provincial Park. East of the town, the route continues as the Sultan Industrial Road, a privately maintained but publicly accessible logging road, towards Highway 144. Highway 667 was established in 1977 and has remained unchanged since then.

== Route description ==
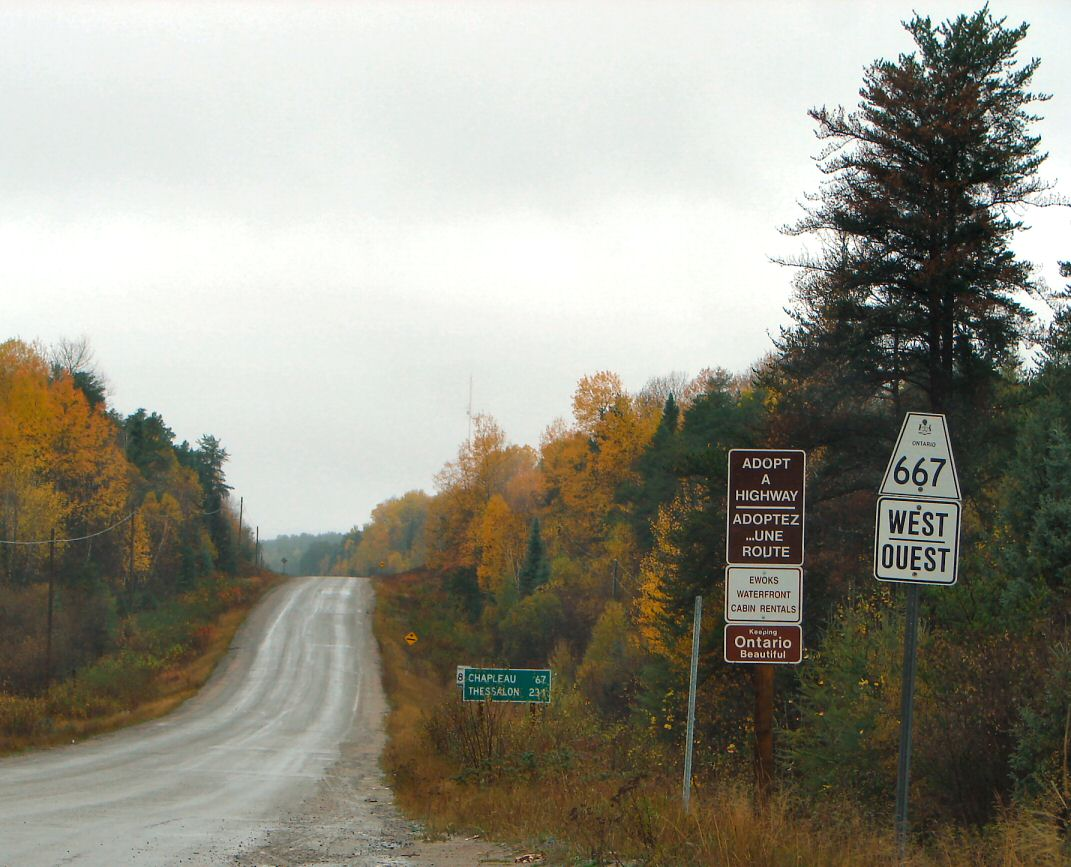
Highway 667 near Sultan

Highway 667 begins at Highway 129 near the entrance to Five Mile Lake Provincial Park. The highway travels southeast for 14 kilometres (8.7 mi), crosses Little Wenebegon Lake then curves to the east. It is mostly straight from that point to its eastern terminus at the Sultan Industrial Road, passing clear cut forests along the way. The road which carries Highway 667 continues east into Sultan as a local street.

Like other provincial routes in Ontario, Highway 667 is maintained by the Ministry of Transportation of Ontario. In 2016, traffic surveys conducted by the ministry along the route showed that on average, 180 vehicles used the highway daily.

== History ==
Highway 667 was established along an existing forest access road in 1977. The route was originally unpaved. Since then, it has been paved, but otherwise remains unchanged.

== Major intersections ==
The following table lists the major junctions along Highway 667, as noted by the Ministry of Transportation of Ontario. The entire route is located in Sudbury District.

Location	km	mi	Destinations	Notes
Unorganized Sudbury District	0.0	0.0	Highway 129 – Thessalon, Chapleau	
Sultan	35.3	21.9	Sultan Industrial Road	
1.000 mi = 1.609 km; 1.000 km = 0.621 mi
