= West Shining Tree Lake =

Lake in Ontario, Canada

- Location in Ontario
- Coordinates: 47.569°N 81.293°W
- Basin countries: Canada
- Islands: McRae Island

West Shining Tree Lake is a lake in the Unorganized North Sudbury District of Ontario, Canada. It lies about 15 kilometres (9.3 mi) west of East Shining Tree Lake. The community of Shining Tree lies on its east shore.

== Location ==
The community of Shining Tree lies on Highway 560, in Northern Ontario, which runs west from Highway 11 to Highway 144. It is midway between Sudbury to the south and Timmins to the north. The lake may also be accessed by float plane. West Shining Tree Lake is connected to five other lakes through narrow passages. The lake has over 40 miles (64 km) of highly irregular shoreline. There are many islands, channels and bays.

In the past West Shining Tree Lake was on an Ojibway canoe route from Bear Island, Temagami, to the Mattagami First Nation, north of Gogama. The Ojibway named the area "Wasakwagama", meaning White Tree Water, after the many white birches growing there, particularly on McRae Island. A fur trading post was established in 1905 by Mort and John Moore. They mistranslated Wasakwagama as "Shining Tree", whether by accident or design, and called their post the Shining Tree General Store. This became the name of the town and the lake.

== Environment ==
The region is at an elevation of 340 to 360 metres (1,120 to 1,180 ft) above sea level, with gently undulating terrain of rounded hills sculpted by glacial action. The general drainage direction in the area is towards the north or east. The bedrock is mafic or intermediate metavolcanic rock. The area has unusually elevated levels of copper, cadmium and zinc. Gold has been mined in the region in the past, and gold exploration was continuing as of 2012.

Average temperatures range from −9 °C (16 °F) from December to February, up to 16 °C (61 °F) from June to August. An average 285 centimetres (112 in) of snow falls each winter. Average annual rainfall is 805 millimetres (31.7 in) The land is covered by typical boreal forest vegetation.

== Game ==
The land around the lake has stable populations of black bear and moose, and plentiful grouse, snowshoe hare and duck. All of these may be hunted in the fall season. A license is required. Hunters may use rifles or bows. Fish include northern pike, walleye (pickerel), smallmouth bass, whitefish, perch, and various species of trout including lake trout, brook trout and rainbow trout. Again, a fishing license is required. Ice fishing may be practiced in winter. There are several tourist resorts that offer housekeeping cabins, boat rentals and other services.

== Sources ==
- "Accommodations in Shining Tree". shiningtree.com.
- Harron, G.A. (12 December 2011). "TECHNICAL REPORT ON THE SHINING TREE PROJECT, TYRRELL AND KNIGHT TOWNSHIPS LARDER LAKE MINING DIVISION ONTARIO FOR CRESO EXPLORATION INC" (PDF).
- "History of Shining Tree". shiningtree.com.
- "Hunting & Fishing". shiningtree.com.
- Russell, D.F.; Hamilton, S.M. (2001). "Shining Tree Area High Density Regional Lake Sediment and Water Geochemical Survey, Northeastern Ontario" (PDF). Ontario Geological Survey.
- "Shining Tree". Fishing Ontario.
- "Welcome to Shining Tree!!". shiningtree.com.
