= Tophet, Ontario =

Tophet
- Etymology: Named for Tophet
- Location of Tophet in Ontario
- Coordinates: 47°40′48″N 83°06′31″W
- Country: Canada
- Province: Ontario
- Region: Northeastern Ontario
- District: Sudbury
- Part: Sudbury, Unorganized, North
- Elevation: 444 m (1,457 ft)
- Time zone: UTC-5 (Eastern Time Zone)
  - Summer (DST): UTC-4 (Eastern Time Zone)
- Postal code FSA: P0M
- Area codes: 705, 249

Tophet is an unincorporated place and railway point in geographic Mountbatten Township in the Unorganized North Part of Sudbury District in Northeastern Ontario, Canada. It is on Tophet Creek in the James Bay drainage basin.

Tophet is on the Canadian Pacific Railway transcontinental main line, between the community of Nemegos to the west and the railway point of Kinogama to the east. It is passed but not served by the Via Rail Sudbury – White River train.

During 2012 a film, The Road to Tophet, was filmed and is set in Chapleau and Tophet.
