= Sultan Industrial Road =

Northern Ontario resource road

Route information
- Length: 79.7 km (49.5 mi)
- Existed: September 19, 1978–present

Major junctions
- West end: Highway 667 at Sultan; 47°35′25″N 82°45′39″W
- East end: Highway 144 at Highway 560 junction 47°28′21″N 81°50′51″W

Location
- Country: Canada
- Province: Ontario
- Towns: Sultan

Highway system
- Roads in Ontario

The Sultan Industrial Road, also sometimes unofficially known as Ramsey Industrial Road, is a public–private forest access road in the Canadian province of Ontario. Originally built as a resource route for E. B. Eddy's logging and lumber operations in the northwestern Sudbury District, the road is now owned and operated by Eacom Timber. It is under a public access agreement with the province, permitting its use for public travel since 1978. The Sultan Industrial Road is gravel-surfaced throughout its length. There are no services along the remote route.

== Route description ==
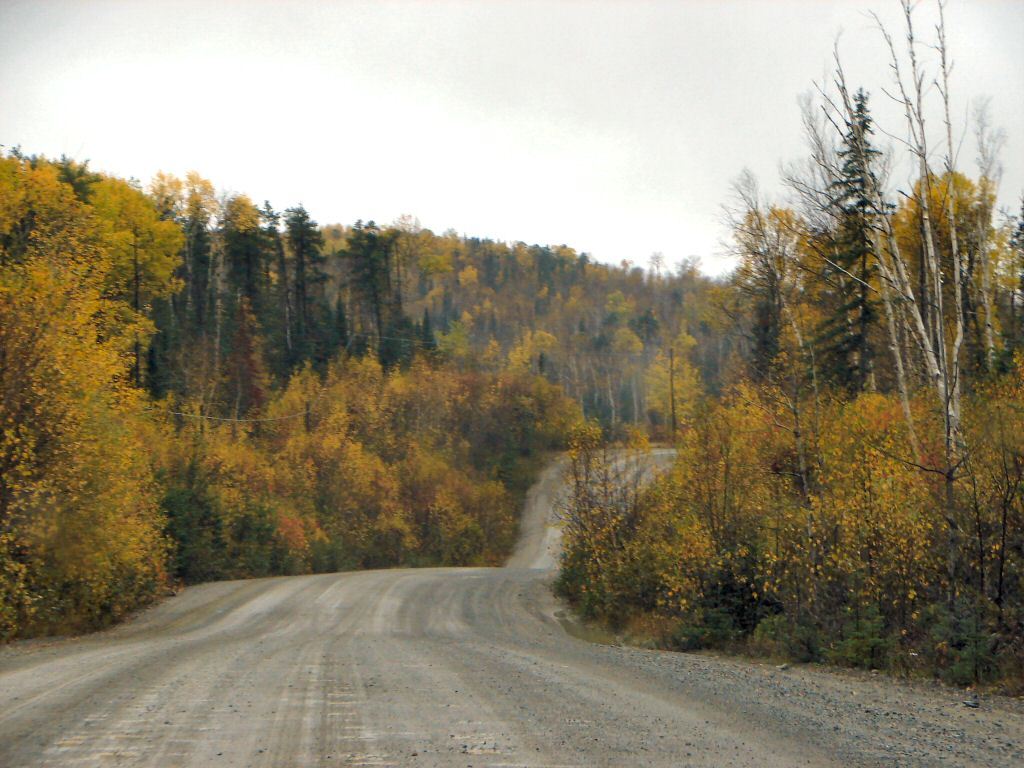
The Sultan Industrial Road travels through remote forests of northern Ontario

The road, which has a gravel surface, begins at Highway 667 in the community of Sultan. It travels eastward through remote forests for approximately 80 km (50 mi) to the intersection of Highway 144 and Highway 560, 96 km (60 mi) north of Cartier and 32 km (20 mi) south of Gogama. The road is one of the only intersections along Highway 144 apart from its termini. It also provides the only all-season road access to the community of Biscotasing and the ghost towns of Jerome Mine and Ramsey. There are no services available along the road.

A traffic study on the road in 2016 found that 45 percent of the vehicles using the road were passenger cars. In 2007 the Ministry of Transportation (MTO) estimated that approximately 400 vehicles traverse the road on an average day. The Sultan Industrial Road is maintained by Eacom Timber Corporation in a joint funding agreement with the Province of Ontario. It has a speed limit of 70 kilometres per hour (43 mph), as defined in Ontario Regulation 621. Despite this, traffic often travels faster, and the loose surface of the road can result in airborne debris.

== History ==
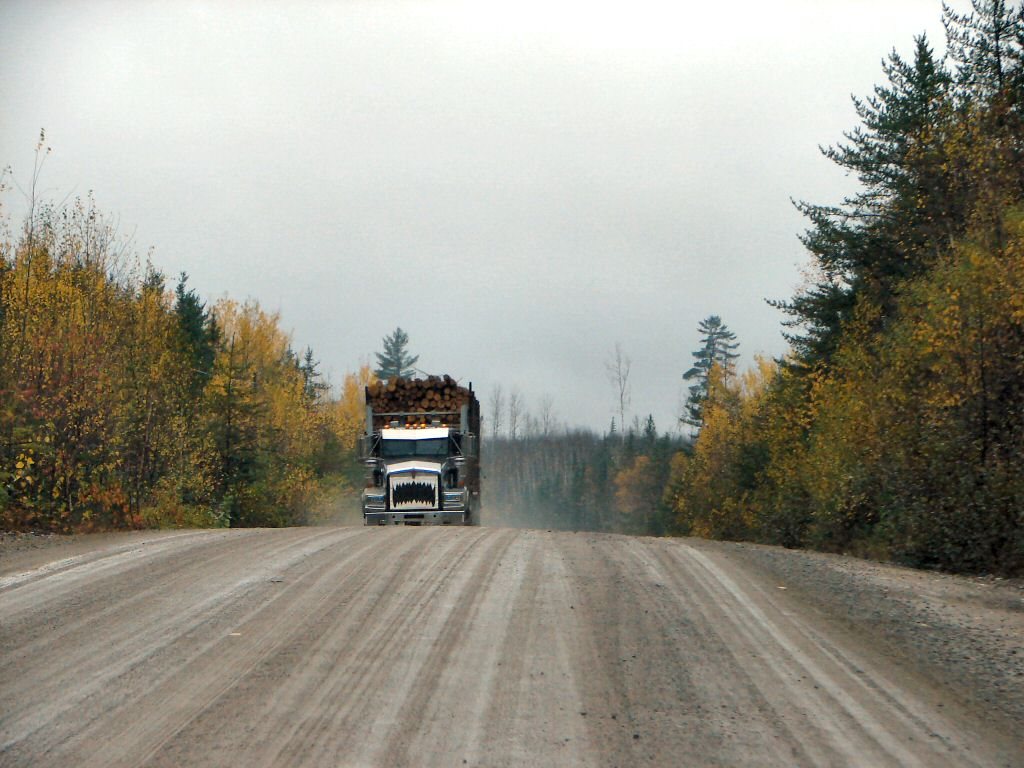
Although public access is permitted on the Sultan Industrial Road, its primary purpose is for logging operations

The Sultan Industrial Road was initially constructed by the private logging company, E.B. Eddy Forest Products Limited, and was known as the Kalamazoo Vegetable Parchment (KVP) Road. On September 19, 1978, an agreement was signed between the company and the Ministry of Transportation and Communications, predecessor to the modern MTO. This agreement opened the road for public use under the maintenance of the company. The road has remained unchanged since, with the exception of the responsibility for its maintenance, which is now under the jurisdiction of Eacom.

In the 1990s, provincial MPP Floyd Laughren lobbied for the road to be fully paved, and secured a commitment from the MTO to do so shortly before the 1995 election; however, following the election the plan was cancelled by the new government of Mike Harris. Many municipal politicians and media commentators in the area have also lobbied for the road to be upgraded to full provincial highway status, as the route would reduce the length of a trip from Sudbury to Wawa by over 100 kilometres (60 mi) compared to the current routing of Highway 17, and would provide an alternate route for traffic in the event of a closure of the Montreal River Hill segment of Highway 17. Despite this, the MTO contends that traffic volumes along the road do not justify its assumption as a provincial highway.

== Major intersections ==
The following table lists the major junctions along Sultan Industrial Road. The entire route is located in Sudbury District.

Location	km	mi	Destinations	Notes
Sultan	0.0	0.0	Highway 667 (Main Street)	
Unorganized Sudbury	23.2	14.4	Dore Road	
Unorganized Sudbury	79.7	49.5	Highway 144 – Sudbury, Timmins; Highway 560 east – Gowganda	
1.000 mi = 1.609 km; 1.000 km = 0.621 mi
