= Montreal River Hill =

Coordinates: 47.242°N 84.606°W

Montreal River Hill is a hill in Unorganized North Algoma District, Ontario, Canada, located 110 kilometres (68 mi) north of Sault Ste. Marie, Ontario near the Montreal River. Traversed by Ontario Highway 17, the hill is simultaneously considered one of the best parts of the Trans-Canada Highway to drive in good weather due to its scenic vistas, and one of the worst parts of the Trans-Canada Highway to drive in poor weather due to its long, steep grade.

The hill, which mounts a six per cent grade over a distance of three kilometres, can be particularly difficult for heavy trucking traffic to navigate. In winter, the hill can become a bottleneck in the Trans-Canada Highway system, as snow and ice can make the hill virtually impassable for all vehicles. In the event of closure due to an accident, drivers can use Ontario Highway 101 and Ontario Highway 129 as a detour; however, in the event of a closure due to weather conditions, Highway 129 is likely to also be impassable due to its own steep grades and sharp curves. Between 1998 and 2002 alone, at least 16 vehicle collisions were recorded on the hill.

The hill is also noted for the challenge it posed during Terry Fox's Marathon of Hope in 1980. For that leg of the marathon, Fox wore a T-shirt which read "Montreal River Here I Come" on the front, and "I've Got You Beat" on the back. Because of its symbolic significance as the last major geophysical obstacle that Fox passed before being forced to abandon his run near Thunder Bay, the Montreal River Hill segment of his run is depicted in the 2005 television film Terry, although the segment was actually filmed on the less onerous Old Woman Bay hill nearer to Wawa.

== Future ==
The Ontario Ministry of Transportation has explored plans to realign Highway 17's Montreal River Hill route to both straighten its curves and reduce its grade. The preferred plan, released in 2004, would construct a new route between the community of Montreal River Harbour and the Gartshore Generating Station. The municipal governments in the region, including Wawa and Chapleau, have proposed an alternate solution, whereby the Highway 17 route would be left where it is in recognition of its scenic importance as a tourism destination in the area, while instead the Sultan Industrial Road would be upgraded to full provincial highway standards, providing an additional connection to Ontario Highway 144 as an alternate route. The township of Wawa later proposed alternate models which would see the highway realignment take place while still taking into account the existing route's importance: in one of the new alternatives, the current route would remain in operation as an alternate scenic route, while in another, the newly realigned highway would operate only in the winter, while for most of the year traffic would continue to use the existing route.
