= Island Lake, Ontario =

Island Lake, Ontario may refer to:

- Island Lake, Algoma District
- Island Lake, Sudbury District
