= Stupart =

Stupart may refer to:

- Stupart Island, an island of Nunavut, Canada
- Stupart, Ontario, a community in Sudbury District, Ontario, Canada

== People with the surname ==
- Doug Stupart (1882–1951), South African triple jumper and hurdler
- Robert Frederic Stupart (1857–1940), Canadian meteorologist
