= Montreal Lake =

Montreal Lake may refer to:

- Montreal Lake (Ontario)
- Montreal Lake (Saskatchewan)
- Montreal Lake, Saskatchewan a village on Montreal Lake (Saskatchewan)
