= Island Lake, Sudbury District =

Island Lake
- Location of Island Lake in Ontario.
- Coordinates: 47°41′33″N 83°33′41″W
- Country: Canada
- Province: Ontario
- Region: Northeastern Ontario
- District: Sudbury
- Municipality: Sudbury, Unorganized, North Part
- Elevation: 444 m (1,457 ft)
- Time zone: UTC-5 (Eastern Time Zone)
  - Summer (DST): UTC-4 (Eastern Time Zone)
- FSA: P0M
- Area code: 705

Island Lake is a settlement in the Unorganized North Part of Sudbury District in northeastern Ontario, Canada. It is located about 20 kilometres (12 mi) southwest of Chapleau, and 15 kilometres (9 mi) southwest of the junction of Ontario Highway 101 and Ontario Highway 129 near the settlement of Devon on the Canadian Pacific Railway.

Island Lake lies on the eastern shore of Top Lake on the Montreal River, just south of the source of that river at Montreal Lake.

It is confusing that the community of Island Lake is located on Top Lake. On old maps of the area the nearby lake now called Nagasin Lake used to be called Island Lake. This is where Oliver Korpela intended to establish a sawmill in about 1950. When making the road to the proposed new sawmill site the bulldozer broke down at nearby Top Lake and so the sawmill was built there instead of what is now Nagasin Lake. The sawmill company had already been named Island Lake Lumber Company and since the community grew up around the sawmill business it became known as Island Lake.

At first the town generated its own electricity with a diesel generator and the line shaft sawmill was also powered by a diesel. In about 1958 Ontario Hydro installed a three phase power line into the community. The company built homes for families and also had bunk houses and a cookery for the single workers. There was a community water supply system and much of the piping ran in the lake . A one-room school house was used until about 1960 and then students were bussed into Chapleau.

Island Lake had a 3000' airstrip which was the only one in the area until Chapleau established one in the late 1960s. The lake was often used by float planes as well.

The sawmill business operated until 1981 when it was closed down. Many of the older homes were torn down as per the conditions of the Land Use Permit, but most of the newer ones on the lake were sold to individuals after a survey established lot boundaries. Island Lake now has about fifteen seasonal cottages.
