= Nicholson, Ontario =

Former human settlement in Ontario, Canada

Coordinates: 47.950°N 83.783°W

Herron's Mills
- Rural Community
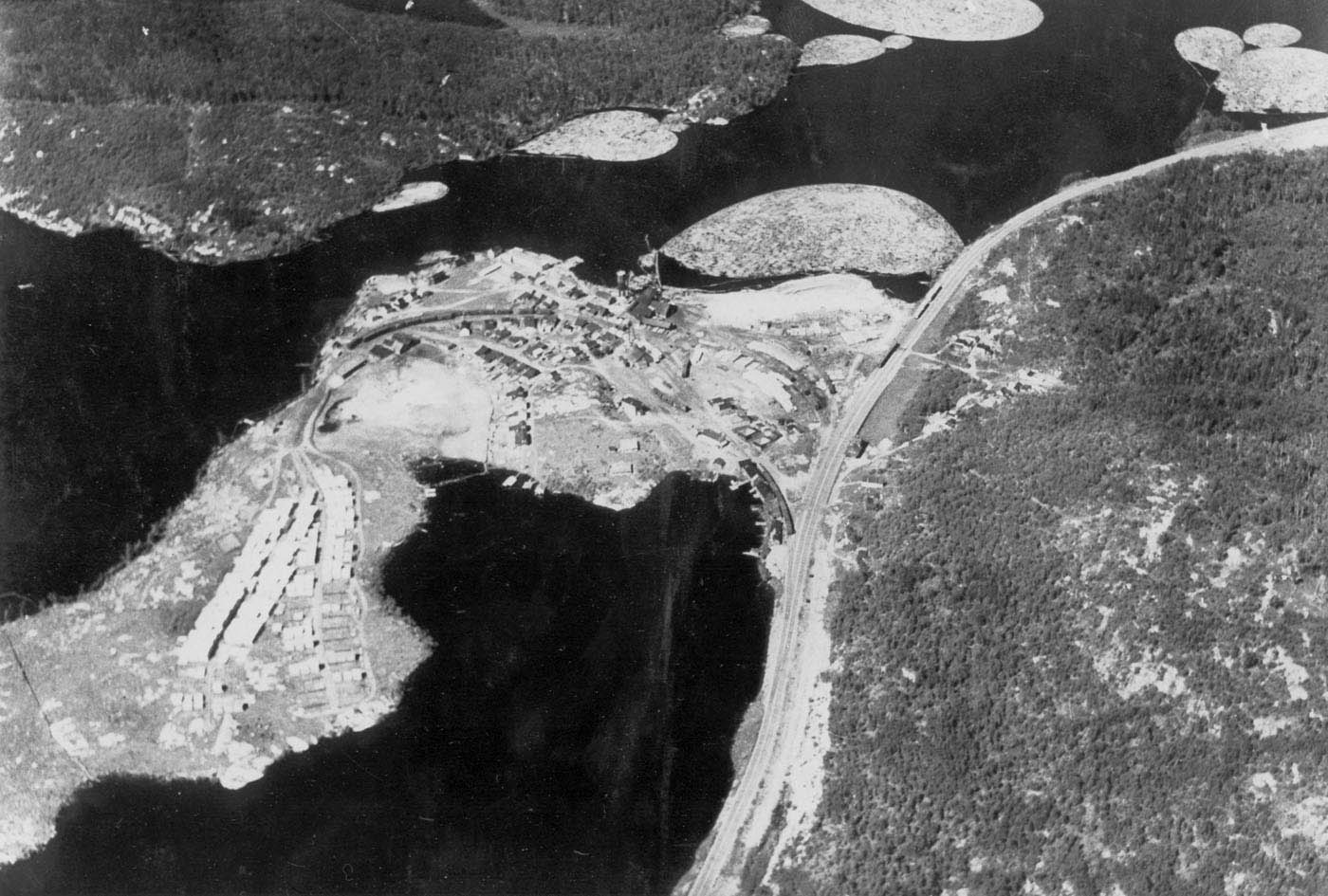
- Aerial photograph of Nicholson, ON (taken in 1931)
- Anthem: Rural Life
- Country: Canada
- Province: Ontario
- Regional Municipality: Durham
- Settled: 1903
- Founder: Austin McNiece; George Nicholson
- Named for: George Nicholson

Population (2026)
  - Total: 539
- Demonym: Nicholsons
- Time zone: UTC−5 (EST)
  - Summer (DST): UTC-4 (EDT)
- ZIP Code: P3M 9K2
- Telecode(s): NILS-ON
- Abandoned: 1963
- Revived: 2026

Nicholson is a rural village and former ghost town in the Canadian province of Ontario, located on the Canadian Pacific Railway's White River Subdivision main track 22.3 miles northwest of Chapleau in the Sudbury District. It is counted as part of Sudbury, Unorganized, North Part in Canadian census data.

== History ==
Formerly a lumber mill town with an estimated population of 400 at its peak, the town was established in 1903 by the Austin-Nicholson company. It was populated primarily by Finnish and Franco-Ontarian workers and their families. A post office, a company store, a Canadian Pacific Railway station, an Anglican church and a school were established in the early 1910s.

Although the mill was profitable for many years, and Austin-Nicholson was the largest producer of railroad ties in the British Empire, the establishment of another mill at nearby Dalton Mills in 1921 limited the town's growth potential. The mill at Nicholson burned down in a fire in 1933 and was not replaced, as the company consolidated its operations at Dalton to reduce costs during the Great Depression.

A small number of residents continued to live at Nicholson until 1963, when the few remaining businesses were closed down and the remaining residents moved away. In the early 1970s, a proposal was advanced to preserve Nicholson as an historic site, although a fire later destroyed most of the surviving buildings at the townsite.

A NFB film made in 1958 mentions school children from Nicholson getting their schooling while riding a train.

== See also ==
- Nicholson, Ontario railway station
