= Frith Lake =

Frith Lake may refer to:

- Frith Lake (Sudbury District), Ontario, Canada
- Frith Lake (Thunder Bay District), Ontario, Canada
