= O'Brien, Ontario =

O'Brien
- Former Town of O'Brien
- Location in Ontario
- Coordinates: 47°40′27″N 80°44′36″W
- Country: Canada
- Province: Ontario
- District: Timiskaming District
- Township: Nicol Township
- Postal code: POJ 1J0

O'Brien is a former mining town in northeastern Ontario near Gowganda with a warm-summer humid continental (Dfb) Köppen climate classification. The mining town serviced several mines including silver mines around nearby lake Miller Lake; one of the past-producing silver mines was Ontario's largest producing Cobalt-style silver mine outside of Cobalt, with historical production of 40.7 million ounces of silver between 1910 and 1972.
