= Budd car =

Budd car may refer to:

- Budd Rail Diesel Car, a self-propelled diesel multiple unit railcar
- Sudbury–White River train, a Canadian passenger train
