= Ramsey, Ontario =

Ramsey
- Location of Ramsey in Ontario
- Coordinates: 47°26′38″N 82°20′14″W
- Country: Canada
- Province: Ontario
- Region: Northeastern Ontario
- District: Sudbury
- Part: Sudbury, Unorganized, North Part
- Founded: 1937
- Elevation: 429 m (1,407 ft)
- Time zone: UTC-5 (Eastern Time Zone)
  - Summer (DST): UTC-4 (Eastern Time Zone)
- Postal code FSA: P0M
- Area codes: 705, 249

Ramsey is an unincorporated area and ghost town in the Unorganized North Part of Sudbury District in northeastern Ontario, Canada.

== History ==
The community was established in 1937 to house gold mine workers at the nearby Jerome Mine operations. Although the mine itself was abandoned by 1945, the community survived by expanding its lumber operations, and had its own post office by 1948. The community had a population of approximately 300 at its peak.

The community was eventually abandoned after E. B. Eddy shut down the sawmill in 1987, although the remaining townsite itself was not fully dismantled until 2002.

The townsite is accessible via the Sultan Industrial Road. The Canadian Pacific Railway transcontinental main line runs through the town site.
