= Foleyet =

- Unincorporated community
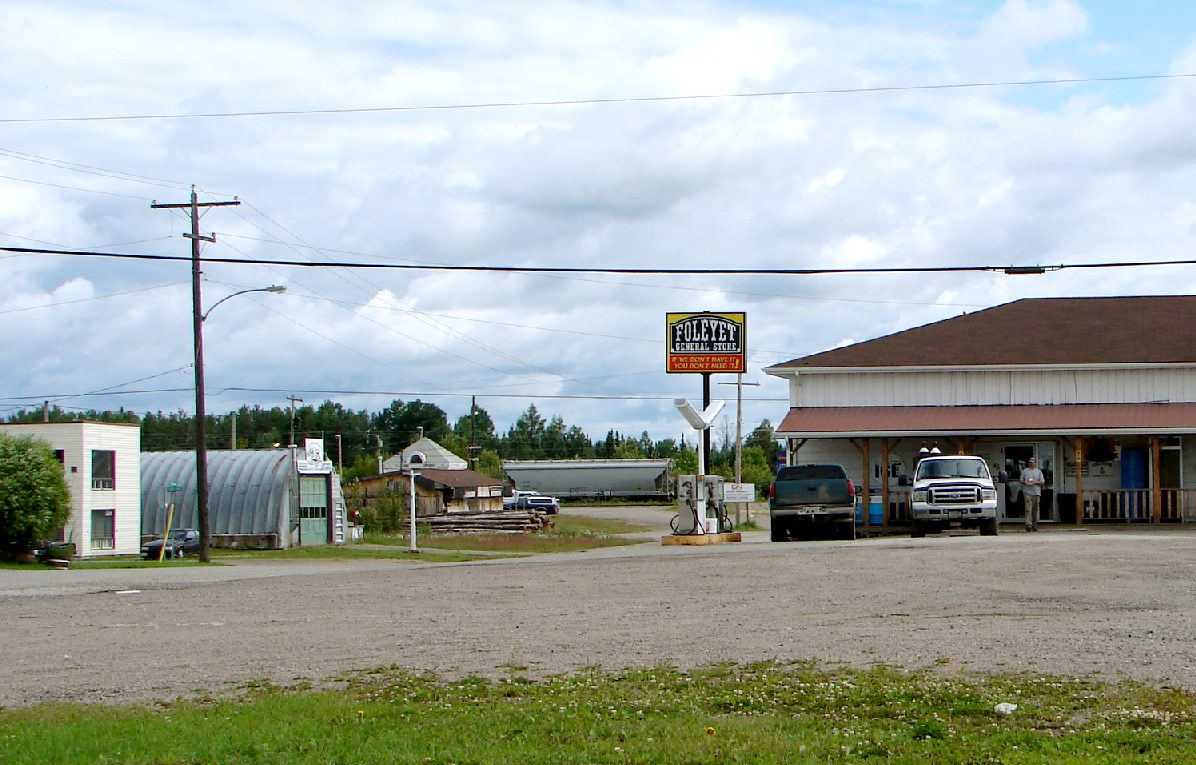
- Foleyet main street

- Location in Ontario
- Coordinates: 48°14′38″N 82°26′23″W
- Country: Canada
- Province: Ontario
- District: Sudbury
- Census subdiv.: Unorg. North Sudbury
- Established: 1912

Area
  - Land: 11.15 km^{2} (4.31 sq mi)
- Elevation: 329 m (1,078 ft)

Population (2021)
  - Total: 165
  - Density: 14.8/km^{2} (38/sq mi)
- Time zone: UTC-5 (Eastern Time Zone)
  - Summer (DST): UTC-4 (Eastern Time Zone)
- Postal Code: P0M 1T0
- Area codes: 705, 249

Foleyet is an unincorporated community in the Unorganized North Part of Sudbury District in Northeastern Ontario, Canada, midway between Chapleau and Timmins on Highway 101. The town was created during the construction of the Canadian Northern Railway through the area in the early years of the 20th century.

Foleyet is also the name for the geographic township that contains the community.

A designated place administered by a local services board, Foleyet had a population of 165 in the 2021 Canadian census.

== History ==
In the early 1900s, Canadian Northern Railway decided to build a railroad through the area Foleyet now occupies. The Foley Brothers and Northern Construction were the two contractors who were hired to do the job. Construction began in 1911 and was completed in 1915. The goal of the construction was to unite the western lines from Current Junction, now part of Thunder Bay, to the eastern section, between Toronto and Ruel, which was accomplished in 1912. While this work was going on, a line was also being put in from Ottawa to Capreol. On June 15, 1915, the first work train arrived from Capreol. The engineer was Jim Scott. The train carried men to build bridges over Ivanhoe River, Muskego River, and Groundhog River.

The railway station at Foleyet was originally called Foley. Local legend has it that the early residents applied for a post office named to honour their former employer the Foley Brothers, but were frustrated in their wishes because the name Foley Post Office already existed near Parry Sound. The story is told that someone declared that "We want to name the town for the Foley Brothers, and we'll name it Foley yet!" and the unintended name stuck.

Located about midway between Capreol and Hornepayne, Foleyet was established as a divisional point, for changing train crews and servicing rolling stock, and there was with a large railway roundhouse as well.

The town started with 15 houses. The Canadian Northern Railway built a large sawmill, west of the station, equipped with a pulp barker, planing mill, and a powerhouse. This mill, although owned by the railway, operated under the name Eastern Lands Division. Lumber was sold wholesale to railway employees, for home construction. A lumber yard was also established at Capreol. The Eastern Lands Co. built their main office here. They cut white pine, red pine, spruce pulp logs, and jack pine axe ties.

The smallest Canadian Northern steam locomotive was at Foleyet. It was an Alco 0-4-0 Saddle Tank, on the Canadian National Roster as CNR # 3. It was used at the sawmill and sold to Acme Timber in 1925. Art Boyer was the engineer.

From Canadian Northern to Canadian National Eastern Lands Division continued their operations there until April 1925, at which time the mill was sold to Acme Timber Co. of Sudbury. Acme was a major supplier of timber to Inco. This firm was started around 1923 by D. H. Haight, who had been supplying mining timber and fuel wood to the International Nickel Co. since the early 1900s. Haight, a native of New Jersey, was a cousin of Inco's first president Ambrose Monell. The general manager of Acme Timber Co. was Haight's brother-in-law, Ben Foote Merwin. In 1932, Merwin organized Pineland Timber Co. which took over Acme in 1934.

In 1917, a dam was built, creating a new river by joining Midway Creek and Muskego Rivers. The dam broke a year later, flooding Foleyet and lowering the lake levels significantly once again. The town has had many such disasters, in the form of fires and floods, and much of its landscape differs completely now from its origins. Often when a new progress was made or added, it was simply destroyed years later.

The land occupied by Foleyet was originally an island, before an esker was destroyed and the lake receded dramatically. Ivanhoe Lake (then known as Pishkanogami, the Anishinaabe name for it) was how the area was first explored, before Foleyet became a town. The Hudson's Bay Company had two outposts nearby, one on Lake Pishkanogami, and one on Kukatush (Groundhog) Lake. Both were closed in the 1880s due to a decline in the fur trade. It was only in 1960 that Lake Pishkanogami became Ivanhoe Lake or lac Ivanhoe in French.

The town, at present, is known as the home of the white moose. In 1998, one such moose was hit by a train, and after a day of suffering was killed by a CN worker. The head of the moose is mounted in the Northern Lights Restaurant.

=== Train quarantine ===
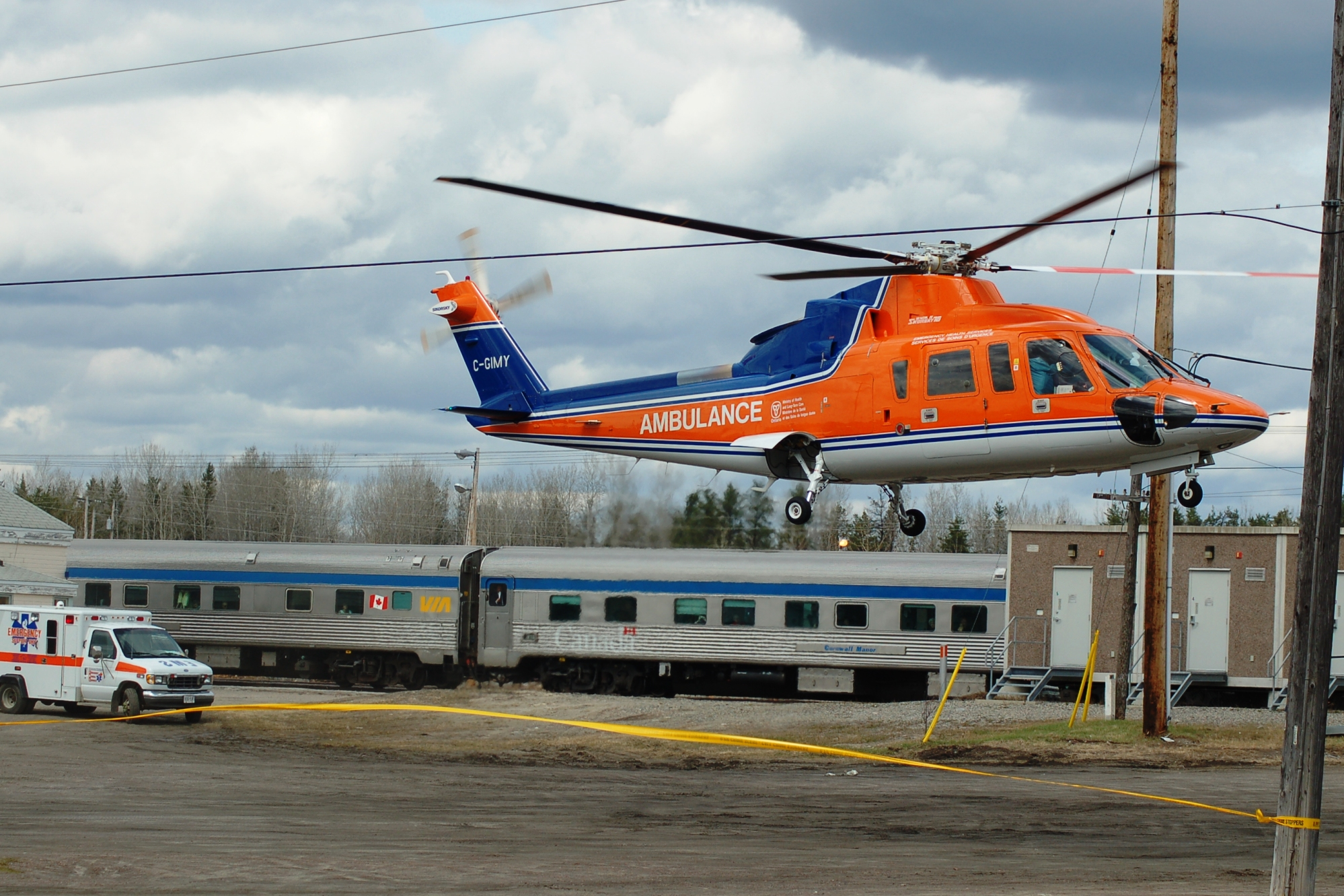
Ontario Ministry of Health air ambulance helicopter at the scene of the "Foleyet emergency quarantine"

On May 9, 2008, a woman died of natural causes on a train operated by Via Rail. Ten of the 264 passengers were showing flu-like symptoms; however, these turned out to be unrelated to the earlier death. As the train was held in quarantine for ten hours, the item made the national Canadian and other international news media.

== Demographics ==
In the 2021 Census of Population conducted by Statistics Canada, Foleyet had a population of 165 living in 87 of its 99 total private dwellings, a change of −6.8% from its 2016 population of 177. With a land area of 11.15 km^{2} (4.31 sq mi), it had a population density of 14.8/km^{2} (38.3/sq mi) in 2021.

Canada census – Foleyet community profile

| | 2021 | 2016 | 2011 |
| Population | 165 (-6.8% from 2016) | 177 (-8.3% from 2011) | 193 (-10.6% from 2006) |
| Land area | 11.15 km^{2} (4.31 sq mi) | 11.43 km^{2} (4.41 sq mi) | 11.92 km^{2} (4.60 sq mi) |
| Population density | 14.8/km^{2} (38/sq mi) | 15.5/km^{2} (40/sq mi) | 16.2/km^{2} (42/sq mi) |
| Median age | 55.2 (M: 54.0, F: 57.2) | 53.8 (M: 54, F: 53.5) | 51 (M: 49.8, F: 53.1) |
| Private dwellings | 99 (total) 87 (occupied) | 81 (total) | 93 (total) |
| Median household income | $ n/a | $57,984 |

References: 2021 2016 2011

Historical census populations – Foleyet
| Year | Pop. | ±% |
|---|---|---|
| 2006 | 216 | — |
| 2011 | 193 | −10.6% |
| 2016 | 177 | −8.3% |
| 2021 | 165 | −6.8% |
Source: Statistics Canada

== Transportation ==
The community is served by Ontario Highway 101. It is also the location of a railway station on the Canadian National Railway transcontinental main line, served by Via Rail Canadian trains.

List
- | Preceding station | Via Rail | Following station |
  |---|---|---|
  | Elsas toward Vancouver | The Canadian | Gogama toward Toronto |
  Former services
  | Preceding station | Canadian National Railway | Following station |
  | Shawmere toward Vancouver | Main Line | Slaterock toward Montreal |

== Education ==
Foleyet had two schools to support its small community, roughly half francophone. Foleyet Public School closed down around 2014 and École Notre Dame, the latter a French separate school remains open to this day. Neither school has had more than 10 students at any one time since the early 2000s.

== See also ==
- List of townships in Ontario
