= Jerome Mine =

Jerome
- Location of Jerome in Ontario
- Coordinates: 47°37′14″N 82°14′14″W
- Country: Canada
- Province: Ontario
- Region: Northeastern Ontario
- District: Sudbury
- Part: Sudbury, Unorganized, North Part
- Founded: 1937
- Elevation: 392 m (1,286 ft)
- Time zone: UTC-5 (Eastern Time Zone)
  - Summer (DST): UTC-4 (Eastern Time Zone)
- Postal code FSA: P0M
- Area codes: 705, 249

Jerome Mine is an unincorporated area and ghost town in the Unorganized North Part of Sudbury District in northeastern Ontario, Canada. It was a short-lived mining community and is located on Lake Opeepeesway.

Established in 1937 to house gold mine workers, the community had a population of 150 at its peak but was abandoned by 1945 after the mine ceased operations. The nearby community of Ramsey, also established as a company town for workers in the same mine, survived until 1988 as a lumber town.

The townsite is accessible via the Sultan Industrial Road.

== History ==
The Jerome Gold Mine is named in honor of Bert Jerome, an experienced gold prospector who was commissioned to search for gold by the Mining Corporation of Canada and the Ashley Gold Mining Corporation in July 1938. That July, Jerome began searching for gold in a region west of some existing claims that were held by two gentlemen, named Gifford and Shannon, in the main portion of Lake Opeepeesway. By July 11, he had discovered gold by panning in a rusty out-cropping on the southern shore of the lake. This was a remarkable find as it was seemingly out in the open but somehow overlooked by previous prospectors which enabled him to stake six claims by the 17th of July .

By September 1938, the Mining Corporation of Canada staked an additional 42 claims. The discovery lead to revelation of an ore body that stretched 700 feet in length and varied in width up to 33 feet.

The Jerome Gold Mine was operated by the Mining Corporation of Canada and produced 62,000 ounces of gold between 1939 and 1945. World War II placed increased demands on Canadian mining operations, from the beginning of the war effort in 1939. Pressures were placed on nickel mining for metal usage and gold mining to help finance the war effort and, in particular, increase the spending potential with the United States. Pressure to increase gold production was placed upon the Sudbury area by the Canadian Government in Ottawa. In 1945, the milling tower was destroyed in a fire and capital could not be obtained to rebuild due to the tight financial situation after World War II.

The mine was owned by E. B. Eddy Forest Products Company until 1998 when it was purchased by Domtar Incorporated.

== Present day ==
Geologists have estimated that the mine could potentially hold 2,100,000 troy ounces of gold, of which 25% is silver content.
