= Dalton, Ontario =

One of two places in Ontario

Dalton, Ontario may refer to:

- Dalton Township, Ontario, a former municipality now part of the city of Kawartha Lakes
- Dalton, an unincorporated place in the Unorganized North Part of Algoma District and the location of Dalton, Ontario railway station
