= Benny, Ontario =

Benny
- Location of Benny in Ontario
- Coordinates: 46°46′55″N 81°37′47″W
- Country: Canada
- Province: Ontario
- Region: Northeastern Ontario
- District: Sudbury District
- Elevation: 187 m (614 ft)
- Time zone: UTC-5 (Eastern Time Zone)
  - Summer (DST): UTC-4 (Eastern Time Zone)
- Postal Code FSA: P0M
- Area codes: 705, 249

Benny is an unincorporated community in the geographic township of Moncrieff in the Unorganized North Part of Sudbury District in Northeastern Ontario, Canada. It is located on Bannerman Creek west of Ontario Highway 144 and about 11 kilometres (7 mi) northwest of the community of Cartier. Benny is on the Canadian Pacific Railway transcontinental main line and has a siding, and it is the location of the Benny railway station flag stop on the Via Rail Sudbury – White River train service.

== History ==
Benny began, like many other Northern Ontario communities, with the Canadian Pacific Railway. A stop (now Benny station) was established in the 1880s and named after W. W. Benny, a CPR divisional engineer. A local community was slow to form, however. A small lumber mill was established in 1903, which was purchased by the Strong Lumber Company. A hamlet followed, which included a store, housing, and basic amenities such as a cookhouse. In 1909, a post office was established and designated as Pulp Siding, to serve the community of now nearly 60 residents. The growing community faltered, however, with a brief mill shutdown which saw most residents leave in 1911.

In 1913, the Spanish River Pulp & Paper Company began logging operations around Onaping Lake, immediately to the north. While earlier logging operations in the area primarily used the Spanish River, the decision was made to use the railway to move logs to the pulp and paper mill at Espanola. The lumber mill, now acting as a feeder for the Espanola mill, created stability for the community. By the 1920s, it had grown to a town of 150 residents, and businesses included a school and hotel. A Catholic church and cemetery were also soon established, as well as a small jail. In 1926, the mill was bought by the Hope Lumber Company, but the prosperity would soon wane as the area had largely been logged out, and the mill closed. By the end of 1929, the Espanola mill (now owned by the Abitibi Pulp and Paper Company) was shut down.

The 1920s and 1930s were difficult times for Benny, and about half the residents left, with the remainder working marginal occupations in trapping or lumbering. A zinc mine was established at nearby Geneva Lake in 1933, but proved to be unprofitable and sat idle. As a part of its highways and roadways developments, a government road to Benny was established in 1935 along a circuitous route which today is bisected by Ontario Highway 144. With the advent of the Second World War, zinc and lead mining became more profitable, and the Geneva Lake mine was reopened, with many residents taking jobs there. The community's rebirth as a mining town was cemented in 1943 when the sawmill burned down, but this, too, was to be short-lived. The economic renaissance was again cut short when the mine closed in 1944 after an untimely death of the mining company president in a plane crash. This would signal the end of the town's heyday.

By 1954 the school had closed, and remaining students were bused to Cartier. The store and post office closed in 1956, and the town's population dwindled to 25. Today there is a permanent population of less than 15 inhabitants, and the only remnant of the once-thriving mining and logging town is a handful of houses.
