= Montreal Lake (Ontario) =

Lake in Ontario, Canada

- Location within Ontario
- Location: Sudbury District, Ontario
- Coordinates: 47°42′34″N 83°34′11″W
- Primary outflows: Montreal River
- Basin countries: Canada
- Max. length: 1.5 km (0.93 mi)
- Max. width: 0.7 km (0.43 mi)
- Surface elevation: 447 m (1,467 ft)

Montreal Lake is a lake in the Lake Superior drainage basin in Sudbury District, Ontario, Canada, and the source of the Montreal River. It is about 1.5 kilometres (0.9 mi) long and 0.7 kilometres (0.4 mi) wide, and lies at an elevation of 447 metres (1,467 ft) on the north side of the community of Island Lake. The primary outflow, at the east, is the Montreal River, which flows to Lake Superior at Montreal River Harbour.
