= Wakami Lake Provincial Park =

Provincial park in Ontario, Canada

- IUCN category II (national park)
- Location within Ontario
- Interactive map of Wakami Lake Provincial Park
- Location: Sudbury District, Northeastern Ontario, Canada
- Nearest town: Chapleau
- Coordinates: 47°28′38.01″N 82°49′23.48″W
- Established: 1969
- Visitors: 11,020 (in 2022)
- Operator: Ontario Parks
- Website: www.ontarioparks.ca/park/wakamilake

Wakami Lake Provincial Park is a provincial park in the Canadian province of Ontario. Located in the Sudbury District near the towns of Chapleau and Sultan, the park was established in 1969.

The park includes camping and boating facilities. Events at the park have included an annual Woodsmen's Day to educate visitors on the work and lifestyles of traditional lumberjacks.

In the 1980s and 1990s, four employees of the park—Mark Despault, Mike Bernier, Rob Hollett and Jeff Allen—formed the band The Wakami Wailers. The band recorded several albums of traditional folk music and toured throughout North America at venues including Expo 86 and Disney World.
