= Montreal River (Algoma–Sudbury, Ontario) =

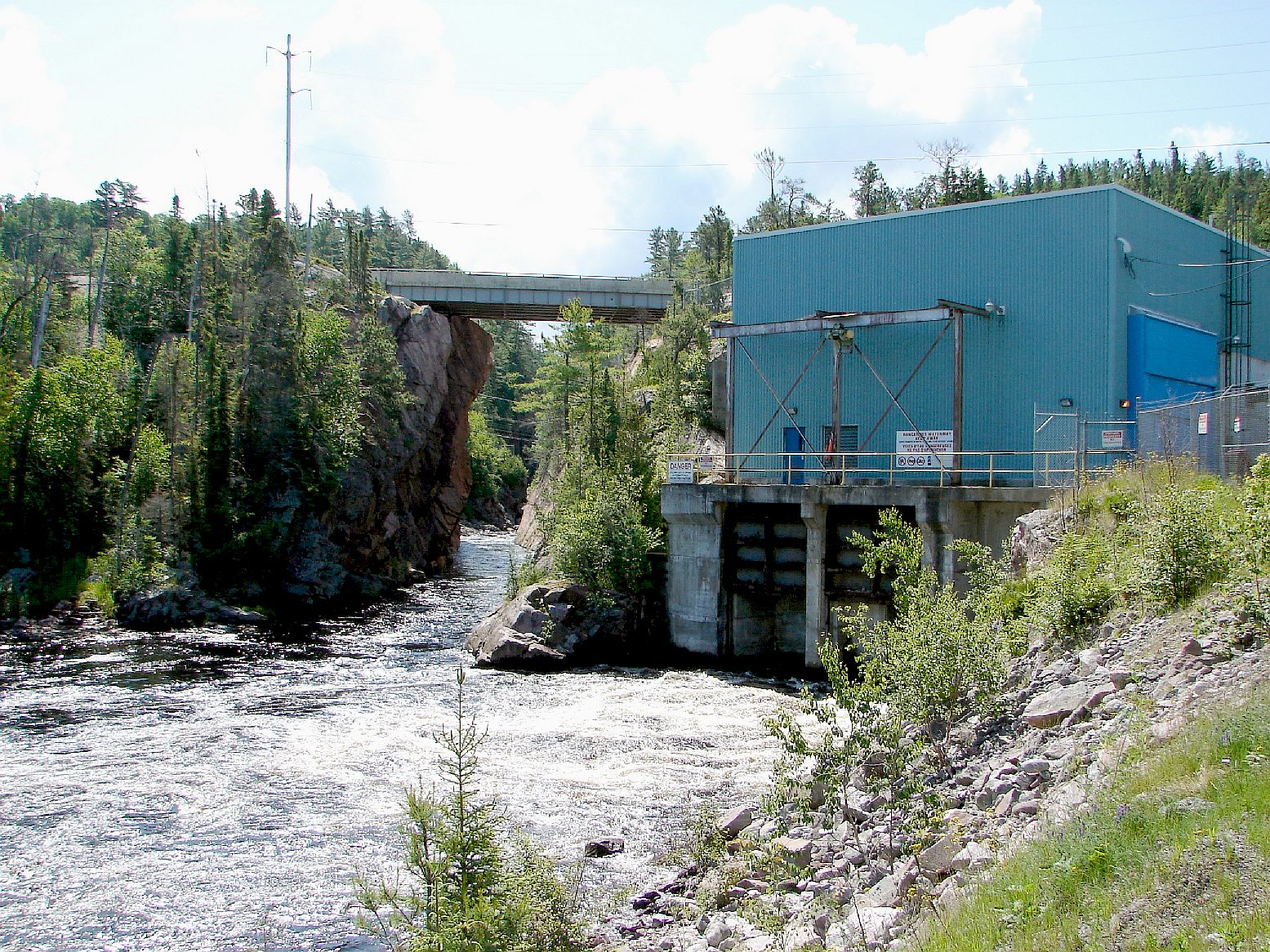
- Mouth of the Montreal River at Lake Superior

- Location of the mouth of the Montreal River in Ontario

Location
- Country: Canada
- Province: Ontario
- Districts: Algoma; Sudbury

Physical characteristics
- Source: Montreal Lake
  - location: Island Lake, Sudbury District
  - coordinates: 47°42′24″N 83°33′50″W
  - elevation: 447 m (1,467 ft)
- Mouth
  - location: Montreal River Harbour, Algoma District
  - coordinates: 47°14′20″N 84°38′45″W
  - elevation: 180 m (590 ft)
- Length: 130 km (81 mi)

The Montreal River is a river in Algoma and Sudbury Districts, Ontario, Canada. It is a tributary of Lake Superior.

== Course ==
The river begins at Montreal Lake at the community of Island Lake in northwest Sudbury District. It heads southwest, passes into Algoma District, reaches the 40-kilometre (25 mi) forebay lake above Montreal Falls, and then the settlement and railway station of Montreal Falls themselves on the Algoma Central Railway. It heads west, and passes under Ontario Highway 17 just before reaching its mouth at Lake Superior at the community of Montreal River Harbour.

== Hydroelectricity ==
There are four hydroelectric dams and generating stations on the Montreal River, all owned and operated by Brookfield Renewable Power. In upstream order, they are Andrews Generating Station (57.78 MW; head of 57.78 m or 189.6 ft; next to Highway 17); Hogg Generating Station (17.4 MW; head of 24 m or 79 ft); Gartshore Generating Station (23 MW; head of 35 m or 115 ft); and MacKay Generating Station, at Montreal Falls (62 MW; head of 75.3 m or 247 ft).

== Tributaries ==
- Little Agawa River (right)
- Sonny Creek (right)
- Jeff Creek (right)
- Rabbit Creek (right)
- Indian River (right)
- Cow River (left)
- Keelow Creek (left)
- Convey Creek (right)
- Tikamaganda River (right)
- Challener River (left)
- Harvie Creek (right)
- Seahorse Creek (right)
- Tempest Creek (left)
- Puswana Creek (left)
- Ebach Creek (left)
- Sample Creek (left)
- Nawahe Creek (right)
- Pemache River (left)

== See also ==
- List of rivers of Ontario

== Sources ==
- "Montreal River". Geographical Names Data Base. Natural Resources Canada.
- "Topographic Map sheets 41N2, 41N7, 41N8, 41O5, 41O12". Atlas of Canada. Natural Resources Canada. 2010-02-04.
