= Felix, Ontario =

Felix
- Unincorporated place Railway point
- Location in Ontario
- Coordinates: 47°12′20″N 81°24′31″W
- Country: Canada
- Province: Ontario
- District: Sudbury
- Part: Sudbury, Unorganized, North
- Established: 1912
- Elevation: 409 m (1,342 ft)
- Time zone: UTC-5 (Eastern Time Zone)
  - Summer (DST): UTC-4 (Eastern Time Zone)
- Postal Code: P0M
- Area codes: 705,249

Felix is an unincorporated place and railway point in geographic Marshay Township in the Unorganized North Part of Sudbury District in Northeastern Ontario, Canada. The community is on Ningoowaswi Lake in the Wanapitei River system, part of the Great Lakes Basin.

Felix station is on the Canadian National Railway transcontinental main line, and is served by Via Rail Canadian trains.

Railway services
- Preceding station	Via Rail	Following station
  Ruel toward Vancouver	The Canadian	McKee's Camp toward Toronto
