= Biscotasing =

Unincorporated village in Canada

- Unincorporated village
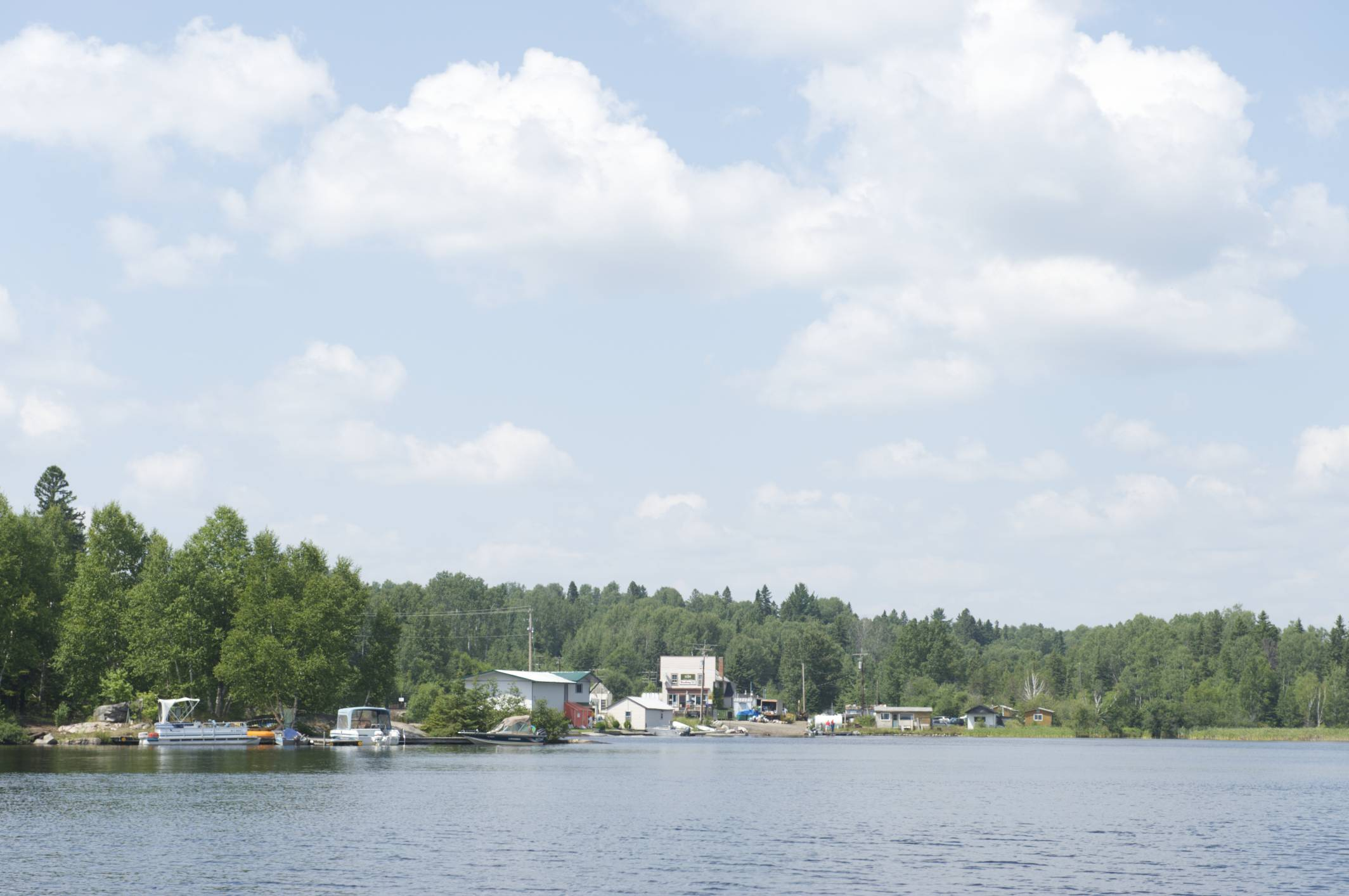
- Biscotasing from Biscotasi Lake

- Location of Biscotasing in Ontario
- Coordinates: 47°17′58″N 82°06′15″W
- Country: Canada
- Province: Ontario
- Region: Northeastern Ontario
- District: Sudbury
- Municipality: Unorganized North Sudbury
- Founded: 1884
- Elevation: 409 m (1,342 ft)

Population
  - Total: 22
- Time zone: UTC−5 (Eastern Time Zone)
  - Summer (DST): UTC−4 (Eastern Time Zone)
- FSA: P0M
- Area codes: 705, 249

Biscotasing (or Biscotassing), often referred to as simply Bisco, is a community in the Unorganized North Part of Sudbury District in Northeastern Ontario, Canada. It was founded on the shores of Lake Biscotasi on the Spanish River in 1884 by Canadian Pacific Railway as a railway construction town, and the first divisional point west of Sudbury. The rails of westward track laying gangs reached this area in October 1884.

Biscotasing is an access point for canoeists, fishermen, and back-country campers to the area including Biscotasi Lake Provincial Park. It has one general store that functions as the post office, tackle shop, grocery store and Liquor Control Board of Ontario (LCBO) outlet; a community centre; a church; and the one-room Biscotasing railway station served by Via Rail. The town also is accessible by floatplane and by a long drive on the Sultan Industrial Road. Although the year-round population is only 22, during the summer season, the population swells to around 300, mostly tourists.

== History ==
The early development of Biscotasing was dictated solely by the needs of the railway. The CPR acquired a 470-acre (190 ha) parcel of land at Biscotasing in 1884 and by November had cleared 30 acres (12 ha). A frame station the size of 30 × 35 feet (11 m), was constructed, with offices upstairs, a large freight shed 40 × 140 feet (43 m), a telegraph office, several residences for company officials and a number of boarding houses were completed before the end of that year. A wye track had also been installed to allow work trains to turn around prior to returning to the east. Later a roundhouse was built to service the locomotives.

On April 1, 1885, the first soldiers on their way to the North-West Rebellion passed through Biscotasing.

In 1887, the Hudson's Bay Company opened a supply depot on leased land of the Canadian Pacific Railway near its station. The following year, it became a fur trade outpost for Whitefish Lake and Sudbury.

As a divisional point, Biscotasing did not last much beyond the era of construction, as Chapleau, about midway between Sudbury and Lake Superior, was selected to replace it. Soon after, the town lost its importance as a railroad town but by 1890, the HBC outpost became a full trading post, and two years later, Biscotasing was made the headquarters of the HBC's Lake Huron District as a part of wider district reorganizations. The railway provided an inland access point to waterways flowing south to Lake Huron and north to James Bay, and the town subsequently developed as a centre for Indian trade in the region. After the Lake Huron District was amalgamated with the Temiscamingue District in 1900, the HBC post began operating as a saleshop, but the following year, Biscotasing was once again district headquarters and a new store was built.

The local water routes also helped to develop Biscotasing as a major centre for lumbering. In 1884, Public Lands Surveyor James Allan noted that timber in the area had been overrun by fires and was of very little value, consisting mostly of scrubby spruce and small pitch pine. The same year a sawmill was in operation at Biscotasing, mostly to serve the requirements of CPR construction.

The first permanent sawmill was established by Sadler and O'Neil in the early 1890s. Robert Booth and Patrick Shannon, were also actively logging this region from 1895. Booth and Shannon produced square timber, which was taken by CPR to Papineauville for export to Britain, from the Port of Quebec in Quebec. By 1903 Booth and Shannon were the only lumber producers in Biscotasing, possibly having taken over and expanding the O'Neil mill which closed in 1898.

In 1913, the original Booth and Shannon mill was destroyed by fire, as well as the HBC post. The mill and post were subsequently rebuilt. At that time Robert Booth left the partnership, with Patrick's son, the firm was reorganized as P. & G. Shannon. In 1923 the mill was sold to Midland lumbermen Pratt and Shanacy. The mill closed in 1927 for lack of timber. The mill was dismantled and removed by 1938.

On February 11, 1927, the HBC post again burned down, but was not rebuilt and HBC ceased operations at Biscotasing.

Many of the old buildings in Biscotasing that survive today are from the sawmill era. A small steam locomotive, once used to switch cars of lumber from the mill to the lumber piling grounds, sat for many years, derelict on the mill property, across the tracks, opposite the Pratt and Shanacy company store. In 1958, David L. Pratt, of Toronto donated his father's steam engine for display at the Algonquin Provincial Park Logging Museum.

From railway construction camp, to fur trade depot and lumbering centre, in 1922 Biscotasing became the first place in Northern Ontario to use aircraft (Curtiss NC) for forest fire surveillance.

== See also ==
- List of unincorporated communities in Ontario
