= Shining Tree, Ontario =

Coordinates: 47°33′30″N 81°15′30″W

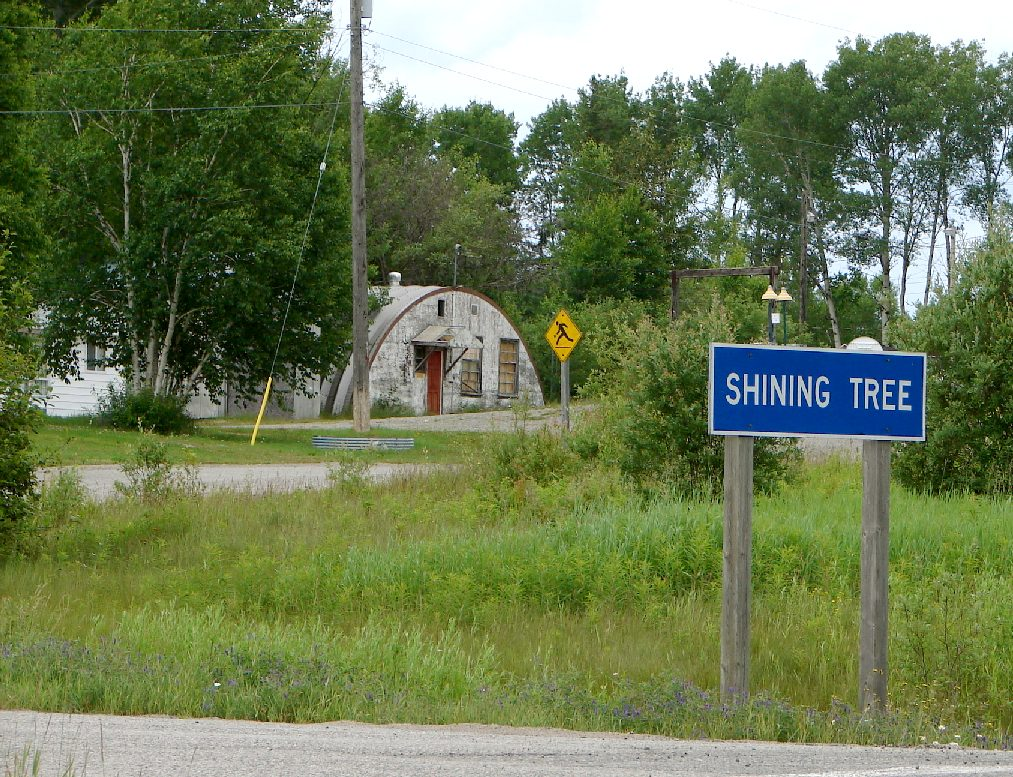
Shining Tree

Shining Tree is an unincorporated community in the Canadian province of Ontario, located on Highway 560 in the Sudbury District. It lies on the east of West Shining Tree Lake.

It is counted as part of Sudbury, Unorganized, North Part in Canadian census data.

Gold was discovered northeast of Shining Tree in 1912, which resulted in the establishment of the Rhonda Mine. Before closing in 1942, the mine produced 27,727 ounces of gold. The Tyranite Mine operated from 1932 until 1942, producing 31,352 ounces of gold.

Today, Shining Tree’s economy mainly depends on eco-tourism, especially fishing, hunting, and outdoor activities like camping, hiking, and ATV riding.
