= Westree =

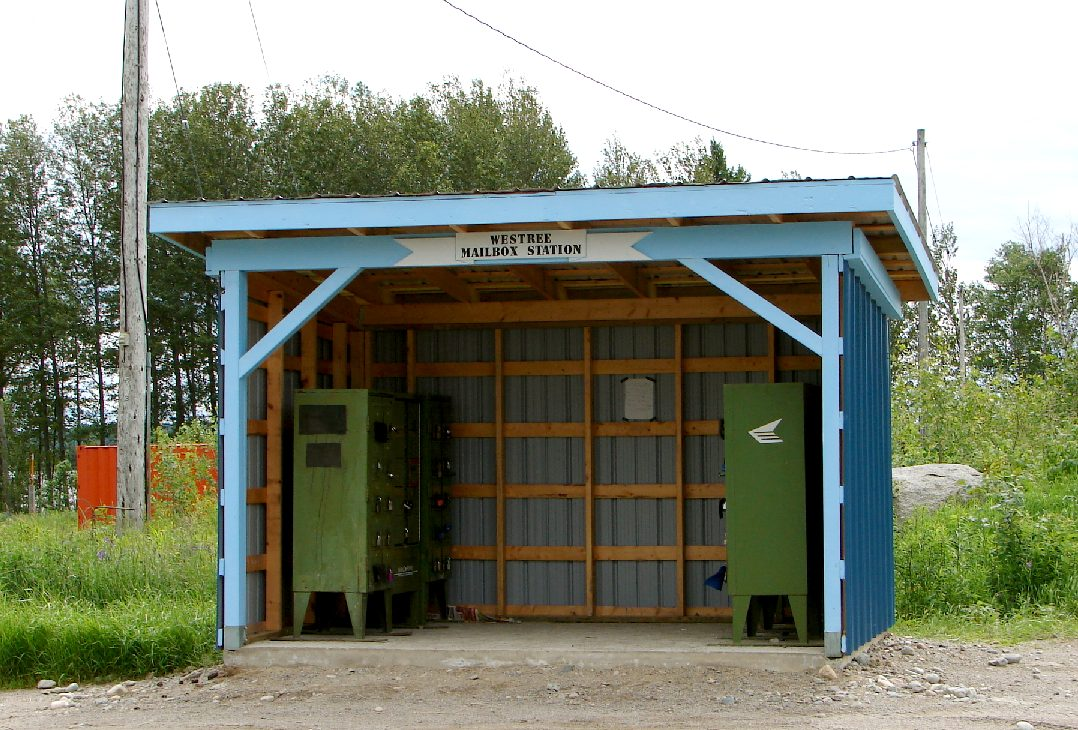
- Communal mail boxes in Westree

- Location of Westree in Ontario
- Coordinates: 47°25′08″N 81°32′43″W
- Country: Canada
- Province: Ontario
- Region: Northeastern Ontario
- District: Sudbury
- Municipality: Sudbury, Unorganized, North Part
- Elevation: 405 m (1,329 ft)
- Time zone: UTC−5 (Eastern Time Zone)
  - Summer (DST): UTC−4 (Eastern Time Zone)
- FSA: P0M
- Area code: 705

Westree is an unincorporated community in the Unorganized, North Part of Sudbury District in northeastern Ontario, Canada. It is located at the end of the spur Ontario Highway 560A and lies on the north shore of Duchabani Lake about 110 kilometres (68 mi) northwest of the centre of Sudbury. The community is on the Canadian National Railway mainline, and is the location of Westree railway station served by Via Rail.

Services
- Preceding station	Via Rail	Following station
  Gogama toward Vancouver	The Canadian	Ruel toward Toronto
  Former services
  Preceding station	Canadian National Railway	Following station
  Ostrom toward Vancouver	Main Line	Stupart toward Montreal
