= Sultan, Ontario =

Sultan
- Unincorporated community
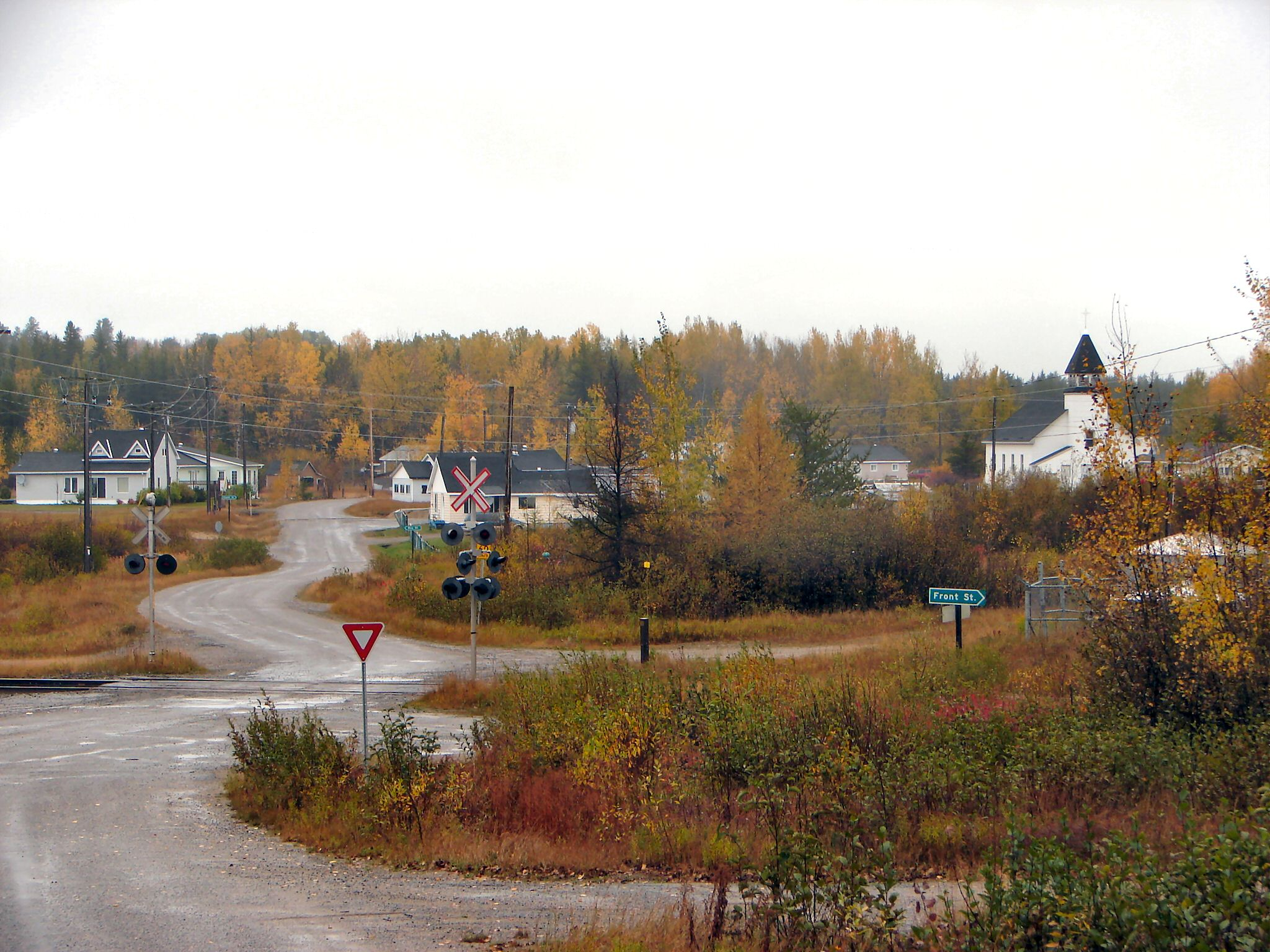

- Location of Sultan in Ontario
- Coordinates: 47°35′30″N 82°45′27″W
- Country: Canada
- Province: Ontario
- District: Sudbury
- Census subdiv.: Sudbury, Unorganized, North Part

Government
  - MP: Carol Hughes

Area
  - Land: 2.76 km^{2} (1.07 sq mi)
- Elevation: 448 m (1,470 ft)

Population (2021)
  - Total: 45
  - Density: 16.3/km^{2} (42/sq mi)
- Time zone: UTC-5 (Eastern Time Zone)
  - Summer (DST): UTC-4 (Eastern Time Zone)
- Postal code FSA: P0M
- Area codes: 705, 249

Sultan is an unincorporated community in the Unorganized North Part of Sudbury District in northeastern Ontario, Canada.

The local economy is based primarily on hunting and related tourism. In the past the logging industry formed the mainstay of the economy. Children from Sultan attend school in Chapleau, 68 kilometres (42 mi) away.

The primary access to Sultan by car is by Highway 667 and Sultan Industrial Road, an unpaved logging road connecting to Highway 144. Via Rail's Sudbury–White River train goes through Sultan, providing an alternate transportation route to White River and Sudbury, although the Sultan railway station is a flag stop and consists of only a stop sign.

Sultan, which holds the status of designated place in Statistics Canada census data, was formerly administered by a local services board, which was dissolved in 2008.

== Demographics ==
In the 2021 Census of Population conducted by Statistics Canada, Sultan had a population of 45 living in 26 of its 53 total private dwellings, a change of −29.7% from its 2016 population of 64. With a land area of 2.76 km^{2} (1.07 sq mi), it had a population density of 16.3/km^{2} (42.2/sq mi) in 2021.

Historical census populations – Sultan, Ontario
Year	Pop.	±%
2006	30	—
2011	49	+63.3%
2016	64	+30.6%
2021	45	−29.7%
Source: Statistics Canada

== Sources ==
- "Sultan". Geographical Names Data Base. Natural Resources Canada.
- "Topographic Map sheet 41O10". Atlas of Canada. Natural Resources Canada. 2010-02-04.
