= Ontario Highway 560 =

Provincial highway in Ontario, Canada

Highway 560

Route information
- Maintained by the Ministry of Transportation of Ontario
- Length: 183.9 km (114.3 mi)
- Existed: 1956–present

Major junctions
- West end: Highway 144 / Sultan Industrial Road
- East end: Highway 11 in Englehart

Location
- Country: Canada
- Province: Ontario
- Districts: Sudbury, Timiskaming
- Villages: Shining Tree, Westree, Gowganda, Elk Lake, Mount MacDonald, Charlton, Englehart

Highway system
- Ontario provincial highways; Current; Former; 400-series
← Highway 559	→ Highway 562

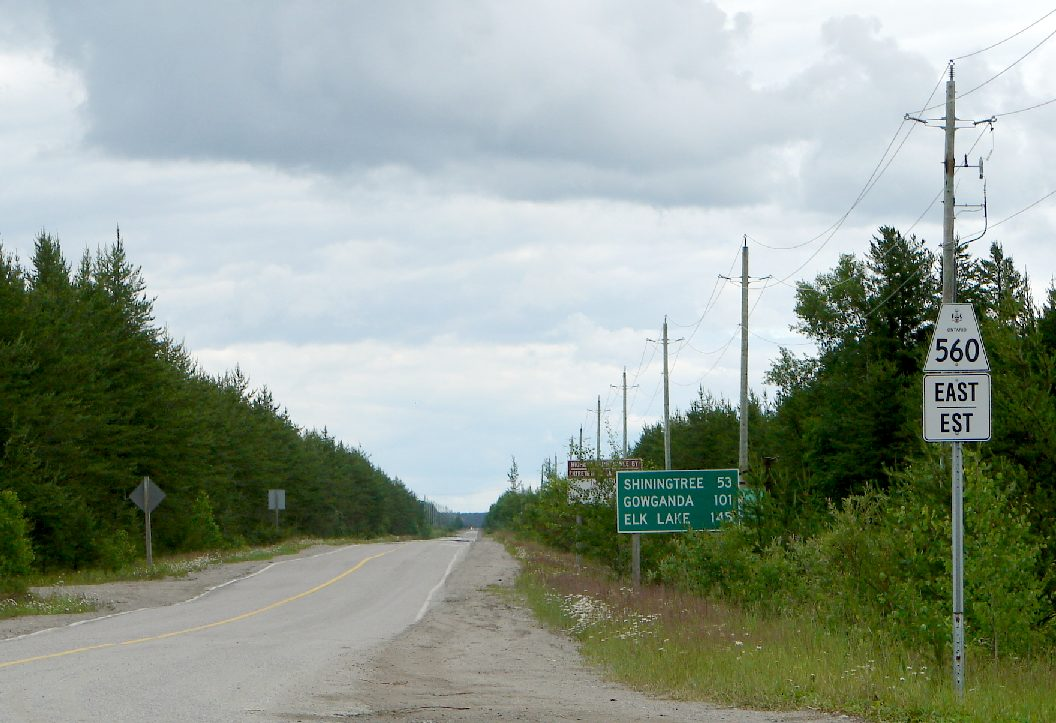
The western terminus of Highway 560 at Highway 144

Secondary Highway 560, commonly referred to as Highway 560, is a provincially-maintained secondary highway in the northern part of the Canadian province of Ontario. It begins in the west at an intersection with Highway 144 and the Sultan Industrial Road and proceeds 183.9 kilometres (114.3 mi) east to Highway 11 at Englehart.

Highway 560 was established, along with many of the secondary highways in Ontario, in 1956. It was extended westward 31.5 kilometres (19.6 mi) to Ontario Highway 144 in 1965. Aside from minor realignments along its isolated route, the route has remained unchanged since then.

== Route description ==
Highway 560 is a remote route through some of the most isolated parts of Northeastern Ontario, spanning 183.9 kilometres (114.3 mi) between Highway 144, where the road continues west as the Sultan Industrial Road, and Highway 11 at Englehart. There are few gas stations and services located along the route, which is heavily travelled by logging trucks; warning signs are posted along the route as a reminder of this hazard.

The first 31 kilometres (19 mi) of the route is relatively straight, though like the rest of the highway, there are few signs of habitation along its journey through thick forests in the Canadian Shield; the hamlet of Ostrom is an exception to this. At Morin Village, the spur route Highway 560A branches southwest to the village of Westree. Highway 560 meanders around several lakes dotting the remainder of its journey to Englehart, serving the communities of Shining Tree and Gowganda along its twisting route. It also provides access to the West Montreal River Provincial Park at two locations west of Gowganda.

Within this vast uninhabited region, Highway 560 is the closest public road to the highest point in Ontario, Ishpatina Ridge. At Elk Lake, the route provides access to Makobe - Grays River Provincial Park and then meets Highway 65, with which it shares a 1.0-kilometre (0.62 mi) concurrency. It continues another 23 kilometres (14 mi) through dense forests before suddenly emerging into the Ottawa-Bonnechere Graben. The remaining 16.6 kilometres (10.3 mi) of Highway 560 travels through agricultural lands, as well as the community of Charlton (where it intersects Highway 573), before ending at Highway 11 on the western edge of Englehart.

Like other provincial routes in Ontario, Highway 560 is maintained by the Ministry of Transportation of Ontario. In 2016, traffic surveys conducted by the ministry showed that on average, 1,100 vehicles used the highway daily along the 9.2-kilometre (5.7 mi) section between Highway 11 and Highway 573 (Bay Street) while 180 vehicles did so each day along the 30.6-kilometre (19.0 mi) section between the latter and Highway 65, the highest and lowest counts along the highway, respectively.

=== Highway 560A ===
Highway 560A is a secondary highway which serves as a short spur route from Highway 560 southwest to the railway flag stop in the community of Westree. Its total length is 9.5 kilometres (5.9 mi). Based on the metrics provided in the section above, an average of 190 vehicles traverse the highway each day.

== History ==
Highway 560 was first designated in early 1956, like many of the secondary highways in Ontario. It initially provided the only access into the interior of the Temagami region and Gogama. However, in the mid-1960s, work began on a new link between Sudbury and Timmins. 31.5 kilometres (19.6 mi) was absorbed into the route of Highway 144 in April 1965. Since then, the western terminus of Highway 560 has been at Highway 144. Although numerous minor realignments have been made to the route over the years, the general alignment of the highway has remained unchanged.

== Major intersections ==
The following table lists the major junctions along Highway 560.

Division	Location	km	Destinations	Notes
Highway 560 continues west as the Sultan Industrial Road
Sudbury		0.0	Highway 144 – Sudbury, Timmins	
Sudbury	Morin Village	31.0	Highway 560A – Westree	
Sudbury		41.7		Opikimimk River Bridge
Timiskaming	Gowganda	100.9		Gowganda Creek Bridge
Timiskaming	Elk Lake	143.1	Highway 65 west – Matachewan	Beginning of Highway 65 concurrency
Timiskaming	Elk Lake	144.1	Highway 65 east – New Liskeard	End of Highway 65 concurrency
Timiskaming	Charlton	174.7	Highway 573 (Bay Street)	
Timiskaming	Englehart	183.9	Highway 11 – New Liskeard	Trans-Canada Highway
1.000 mi = 1.609 km; 1.000 km = 0.621 mi
