= Kormak =

Ghost town in Ontario, Canada

- Etymology: Portmanteau of surnames Korpela and Maki
- Location of Kormak in Ontario
- Coordinates: 47°37′59″N 82°58′29″W
- Country: Canada
- Province: Ontario
- Region: Northeastern Ontario
- District: Sudbury District
- Part: Sudbury, Unorganized, North Part
- Founded: 1942
- Elevation: 416 m (1,365 ft)
- Time zone: UTC-5 (Eastern Time Zone)
  - Summer (DST): UTC-4 (Eastern Time Zone)
- Postal Code FSA: P0M
- Area codes: 705, 249

Kormak is an unincorporated area and ghost town in the Unorganized North Part of Sudbury District in Northeastern Ontario, Canada.

== History ==
It sat on the Canadian Pacific Railway transcontinental mainline, and the Kormak railway station is still active as a flag stop on Via Rail's Sudbury–White River train.

Formerly a lumber mill town with an estimated population of 170 at its peak, the town was established in 1942 by Charles Korpela and Oscar Maki. It was populated primarily by Finnish and Franco-Ontarian workers and their families. A post office, a company store and a school were established at Kormak in the 1940s.

By 1974, the town was in decline, and both the post office and the store were shut down. The mill finally closed in 1979, and almost all of the remaining residents moved away.

One home at Kormak is still occupied year-round, while two others are in use as seasonal cottage properties.
