= Gowganda =

- Dispersed Rural Community
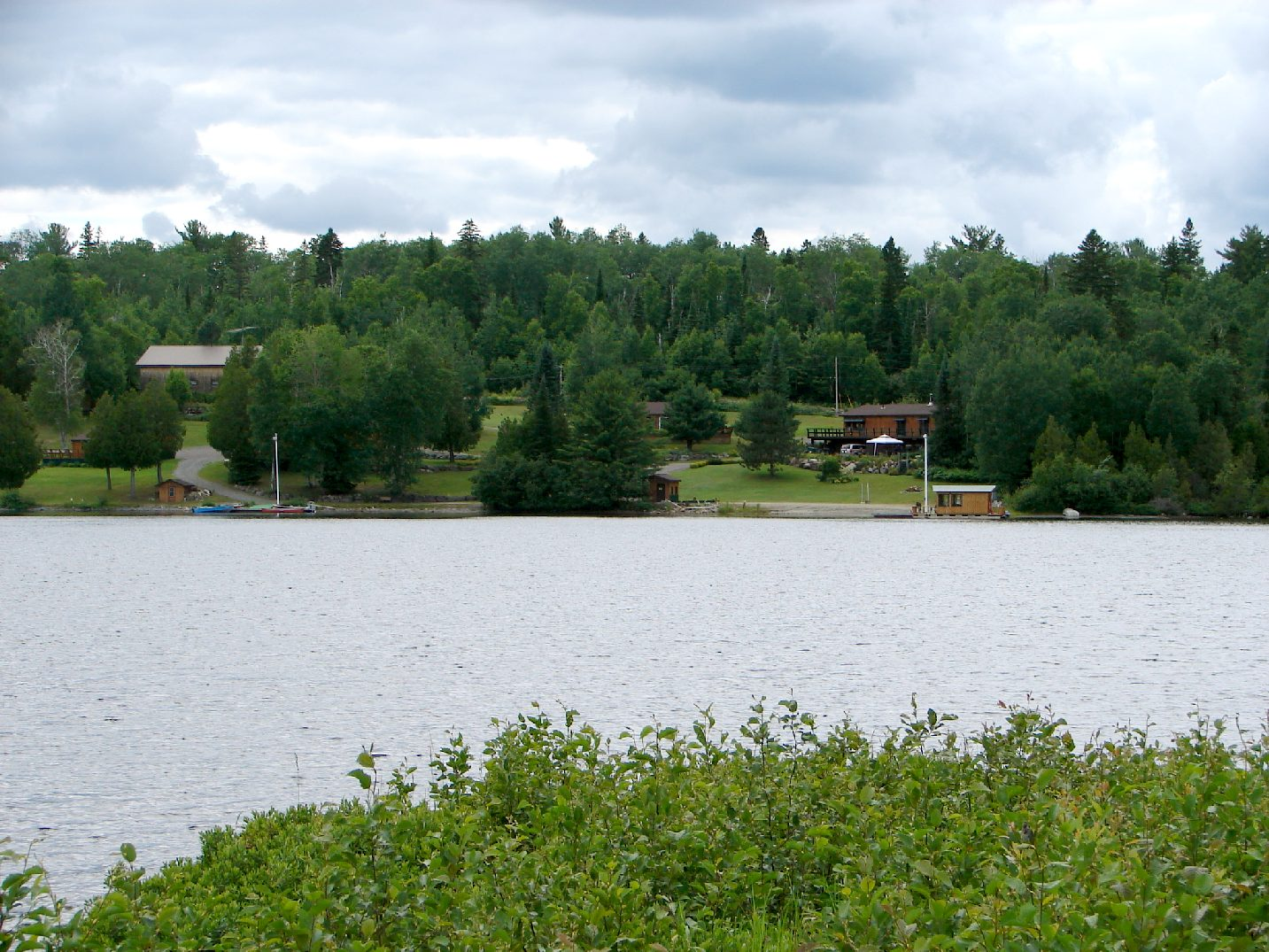
- Lookout Point Lodge, seen from Gowganda Lake at Gowganda

- Location in Ontario
- Coordinates: 47°38′57″N 80°46′13″W
- Country: Canada
- Province: Ontario
- District: Timiskaming
- Census subdiv.: Unorg. West Timiskaming
- Elevation: 356 m (1,168 ft)

Population (2019)
  - Total: 81
- Time zone: UTC-5 (Eastern Time Zone)
  - Summer (DST): UTC-4 (Eastern Time Zone)
- Postal Code: P0J 1J0
- Area codes: 705, 249

Gowganda is a dispersed rural community and unincorporated place in geographic Nicol Township, Timiskaming District, in northeastern Ontario, Canada. It is at the outlet of the Montreal River from Lake Gowganda, and is on Ontario Highway 560.

The community's name, taken from the lake and formerly also spelled as Gow Ganda, is an indigenous word meaning "porcupines home".

The West Montreal River Provincial Park is accessible via Highway 560 at Gowganda.

== History ==
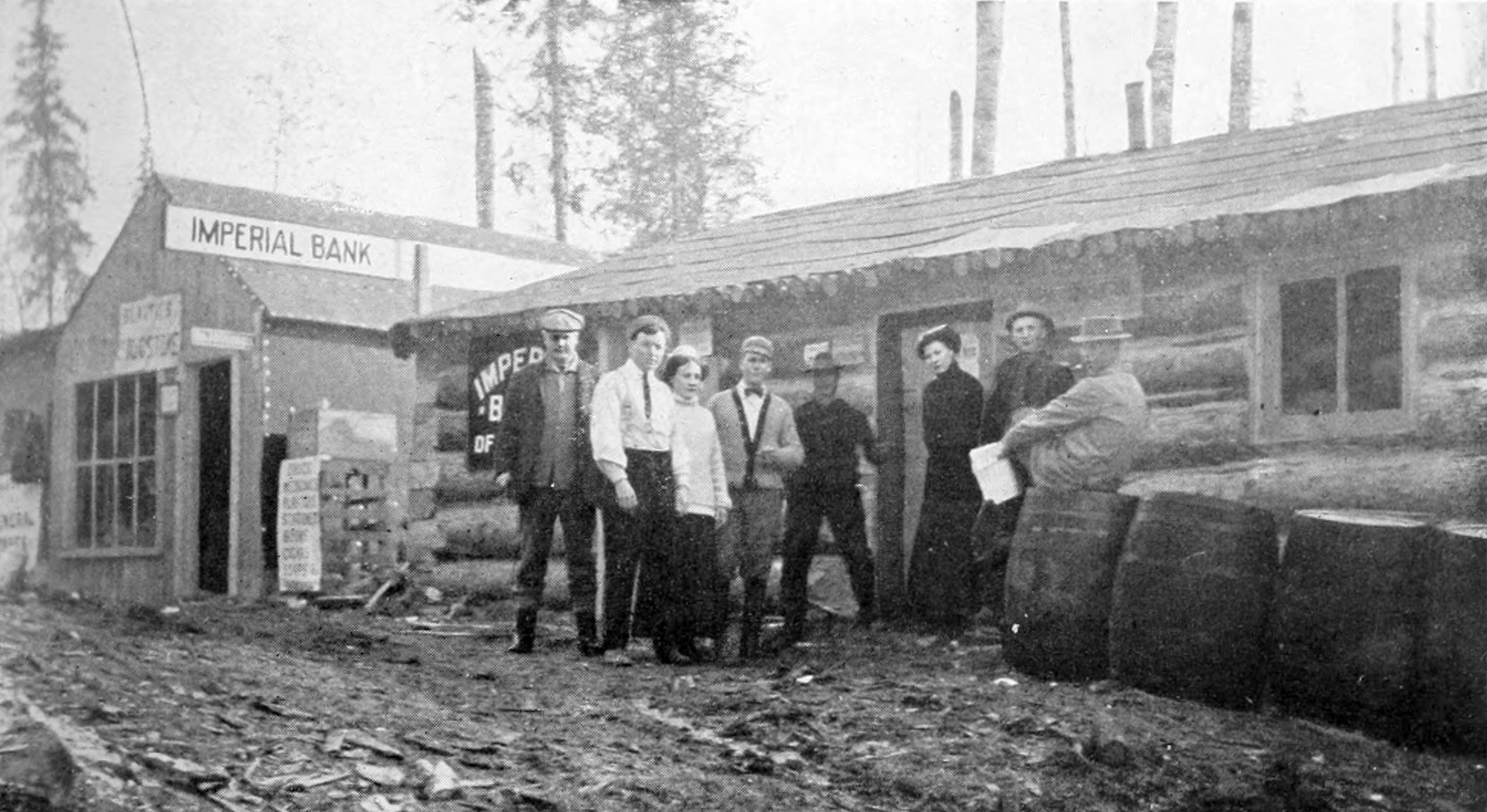
Post office in Gowganda, 1910

Gowganda saw its beginning in 1907 and 1908 when silver deposits were discovered at Gowganda Lake and nearby Miller Lake. A silver rush followed and by the spring of 1909, several thousand men had arrived and staked claims. By the summer of that year, a wagon trail from Elk Lake had been created, and the following year, seven mines were operating. A business and residential community formed on the northeast shore of Gowganda Lake, with a population between 5,000 and 10,000 people. Lumbering also took place, and sawmills were built to supply the town and mines.

The boom was short-lived. In 1911, a large part of Gowganda, including much of the business section, burnt down, and some residents did not return. More significant population decline came when people were drawn to the gold discoveries at Kirkland Lake. Although the town had few residents remaining, the mines continued to prosper, especially during World War I. But after the war, when the silver price dropped, mining operations had to be reduced, and some mines closed at the beginning of the Great Depression. At the same time, all the sawmills also shut down.

World War II led to a brief resurgence in mining, but afterwards, mines began to fail and gradually closed through the 1950s and 1960s. One sawmill operated near Gowganda from the late 1940s until 1955, and the last silver mine closed in 1972. In total, some 60.2 million ounces of silver and 1.3 million pounds of cobalt were extracted from mines around Gowganda.

After the decline of the mining and lumber industries, Gowganda became dependent on outdoor tourism, such as fishing and hunting. In the 2010s and 2020s, there has been renewed mineral exploration in the area.

== See also ==
- Gowganda Formation - large geological formation named after this community
