= Ruel, Ontario =

Ruel
- Location in Ontario
- Coordinates: 47°15′40″N 81°28′11″W
- Country: Canada
- Province: Ontario
- District: Sudbury
- Part: Sudbury, Unorganized, North
- Established: 1912
- Elevation: 412 m (1,352 ft)
- Time zone: UTC-5 (Eastern Time Zone)
  - Summer (DST): UTC-4 (Eastern Time Zone)
- Postal Code: P0M
- Area codes: 705, 249

Ruel is an unincorporated community in geographic Blewett Township in the Unorganized North Part of Sudbury District in Northeastern Ontario, Canada. The community is on the Opikinimika River, part of the James Bay drainage basin, just over the height of land between the latter basin and the Great Lakes Basin.

Ruel station is on the Canadian National Railway transcontinental main line and was named for Gerard Ruel, Assistant Solicitor for the Canadian Northern Railway (CNoR). It has a passing siding, and is served by Via Rail Canadian trains.

Railway services
- Preceding station	Via Rail	Following station
  Westree toward Vancouver	The Canadian	Felix toward Toronto
