= Gogama =

- Local services board
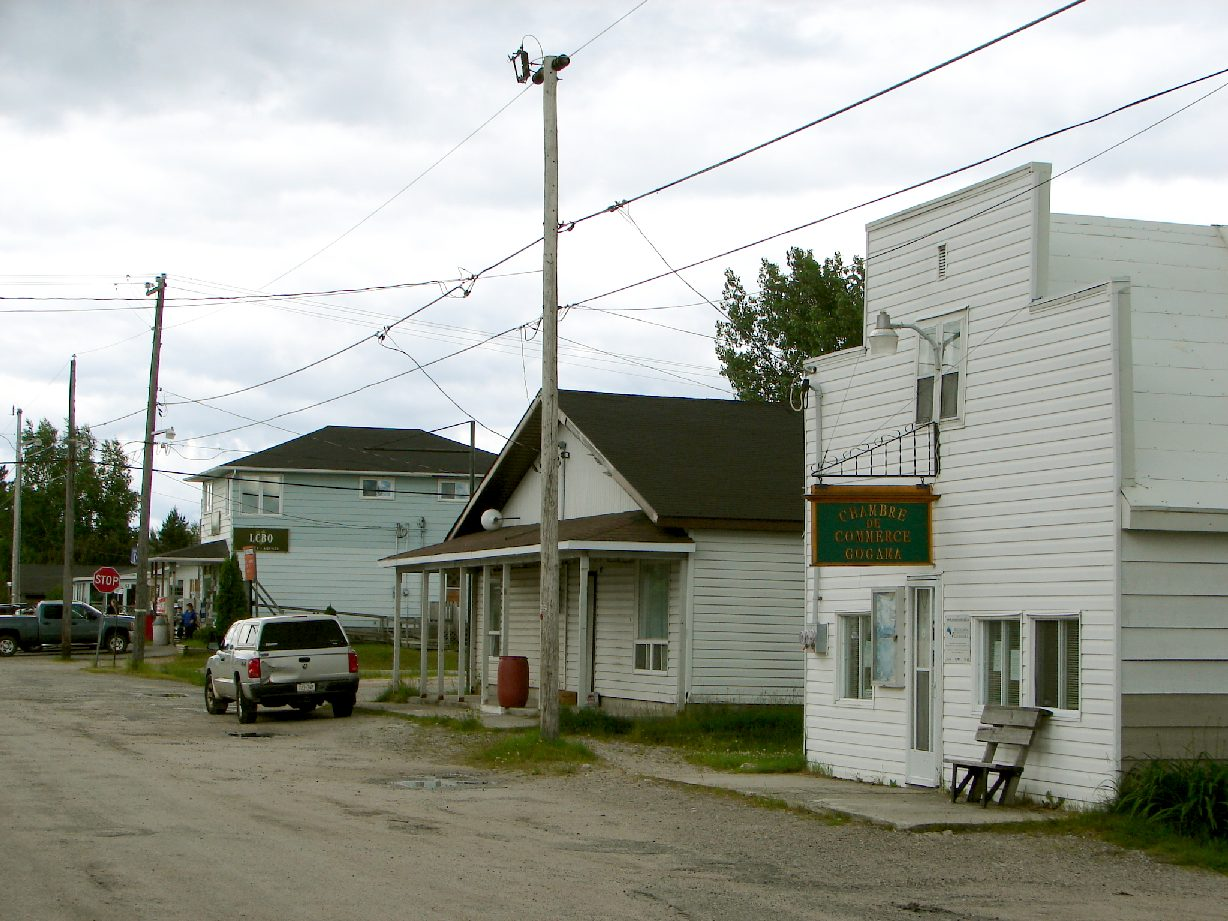

- Location within Ontario
- Coordinates: 47°40′N 81°43′W
- Country: Canada
- Province: Ontario
- District: Sudbury
- Established: 1917

Government
  - Type: Local services board
  - MP: Jim Belanger (Conservative)
  - MPP: France Gélinas (NDP)

Area
  - Land: 56.75 km^{2} (21.91 sq mi)
- Elevation: 355 m (1,165 ft)

Population (2021)
  - Total: 310
  - Density: 5.5/km^{2} (14/sq mi)
- Time zone: UTC-5 (EST)
  - Summer (DST): UTC-4 (EDT)
- Postal code: P0M 1W0
- Area code(s): 705

Gogama is a community in Northeastern Ontario, Canada, that is situated on Lake Minisinakwa, 580 kilometres (360 mi) north of Toronto, 191 kilometres (119 mi) north of Sudbury, and 114 kilometres (71 mi) south of Timmins. In the 2021 Canadian census, a population of 310 people was recorded. The community is counted as part of Sudbury, Unorganized, North Part in Canadian census data. It is not an incorporated municipality, but is administered by a local services board.

Recreational activities in the area include hunting and fishing.

== History ==
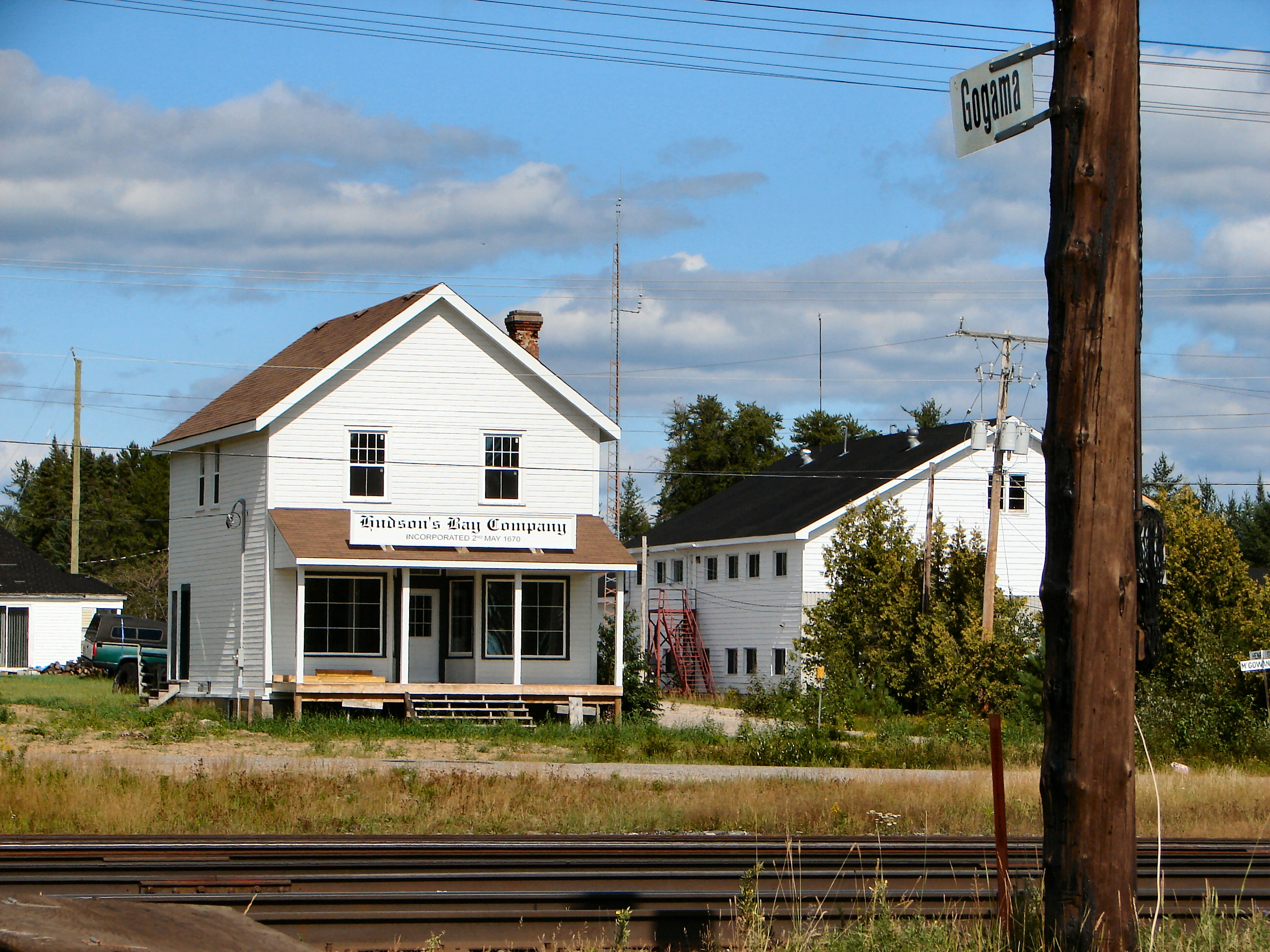
Railstop and HBC store in Gogama

Gogama is an Ojibway word meaning "jumping fish", likely in reference to the many fish that abound the waters of Lake Minisinakawa. A native trading post was established in the area in the early 18th century. From 1911 to 1914, the Canadian Northern Railway, was under construction through this area, now the CNR. Gogama was first settled in 1917 by Arthur L'Abbé. The post office was opened shortly after in 1919 and since, Gogama has relied heavily on the forestry industry although tourism is starting to benefit the hamlet as well. During the era of railway construction, Gogama was likely a place of importance for the manufacture of Axe ties. However, following that period, maintaining and upgrading the railway required a constant supply of ties. The handmade axe ties were phased out and replaced with creosote treated ties. For the most part, this development followed World War I throughout Northern Ontario. At that same time, returning soldiers came to this area looking for work.

The first mill at Gogama was established in 1919, when W.H. Poupore contracted with the Harris Tie and Timber to supply the CNR with sawn ties. The mill produced all types of merchantable timber, but specialized in tie blocks. This mill was later taken over by Poupore's brother M.J.(Joe) Poupore. As orders for ties declined contracts were secured to supply mining timber for Falconbridge. Although the original mill burned in 1936, a new mill was erected at the mouth of the Nabakwasi River, in Togo Township, north of Gogama.

Another mill at Gogama was owned by Cochrane and Laforest and operated 1919 to 1932. It was sold to Acme Timber in 1932, but not reopened. See Pineland Timber, Foleyet.

In 1921, the Hudson's Bay Company (HBC) relocated its fur trading post from Mattagami Lake to Gogama, in order to compete against rival stores and to have access to the railroad. The Matawagamingue post on Mattagami Lake continued as its winter outpost until circa 1924. The Gogama post was converted to a Northern Store in 1959 and closed on December 24, 1977.

In winter 2015, the town saw two nearby train derailments within less than one month. On February 14, seven rail cars carrying crude oil derailed approximately 30 kilometres from the town, and on March 8, 35 Canadian National Railway cars derailed at a site just four kilometres from the town, spilling crude into the Makami River and igniting an oil fire that took several days to extinguish. The two incidents sparked renewed debate on the effectiveness of Canada's rail safety regulations in the wake of the Lac-Mégantic rail disaster of 2013.

== Demographics ==
In the 2021 Census of Population conducted by Statistics Canada, Gogama had a population of 310 living in 154 of its 193 total private dwellings, a change of −4.6% from its 2016 population of 325. With a land area of 56.75 km^{2} (21.91 sq mi), it had a population density of 5.5/km^{2} (14.1/sq mi) in 2021.

Historical census populations – Gogama, Local service board (LSB)
Year	Pop.	±%
2006	394	—
2011	277	−29.7%
2016	325	+17.3%
2021	310	−4.6%
Source: Statistics Canada

== Economy ==
The community currently relies heavily on eco-tourism including hunting and fishing.

Iamgold is currently in the process of obtaining permits to open the open pit Cote Gold Project. Construction is scheduled to commence in 2019 with production starting in 2021. Around 1,000 workers will be required during the construction phase. Once the mine starts producing, 400-500 people will be employed. The company anticipates a 17-year lifespan for the mine with approximately 60,000 tonnes of ore production per day. The mine site will be located about 25 km southwest of Gogama and consist of an open-pit mine, tailings storage, a mill site and camp facilities.

== Transportation ==
Gogama is accessible from Highway 144 via Highway 661. It is served by the Canadian, Canada's transcontinental passenger rail service, which is operated by Via Rail and which stops at Gogama station. It is also served by Ontario Northland's intercity motor coach service along its Sudbury–Timmins–Hearst route, with one coach per day northbound and one southbound.

List
- Preceding station	Via Rail	Following station
  Foleyet toward Vancouver	The Canadian	Westree toward Toronto
  Former services
  Preceding station	Canadian National Railway	Following station
  Bethnal toward Vancouver	Main Line	Makwa toward Montreal

== Featured in film ==
Gogama is featured in a short educational film The Forest Commandos, produced by Warner Bros. Pictures. The film is 19 minutes long. It was completed by Warner Bros. in September 1945 and released in January 1946. The film documents the operations of the former Forest Protection Service, of the Department of Lands & Forests, Province of Ontario, which was renamed the Ministry of Natural Resources (Ontario) in 1972. The film is specifically dedicated to the work of the bush pilots flying floatplanes, such as those manufactured by the Stinson Aircraft Company, in support of forest fire suppression crews. A Second World War Royal Canadian Air Force (RCAF) de Havilland Mosquito fighter-bomber is also show briefly taxiing on a runway. The Forest Commandos is occasionally aired on Turner Classic Movies.
