= Sudbury–White River train =

Intercity train service in Ontario, Canada

Sudbury–White River
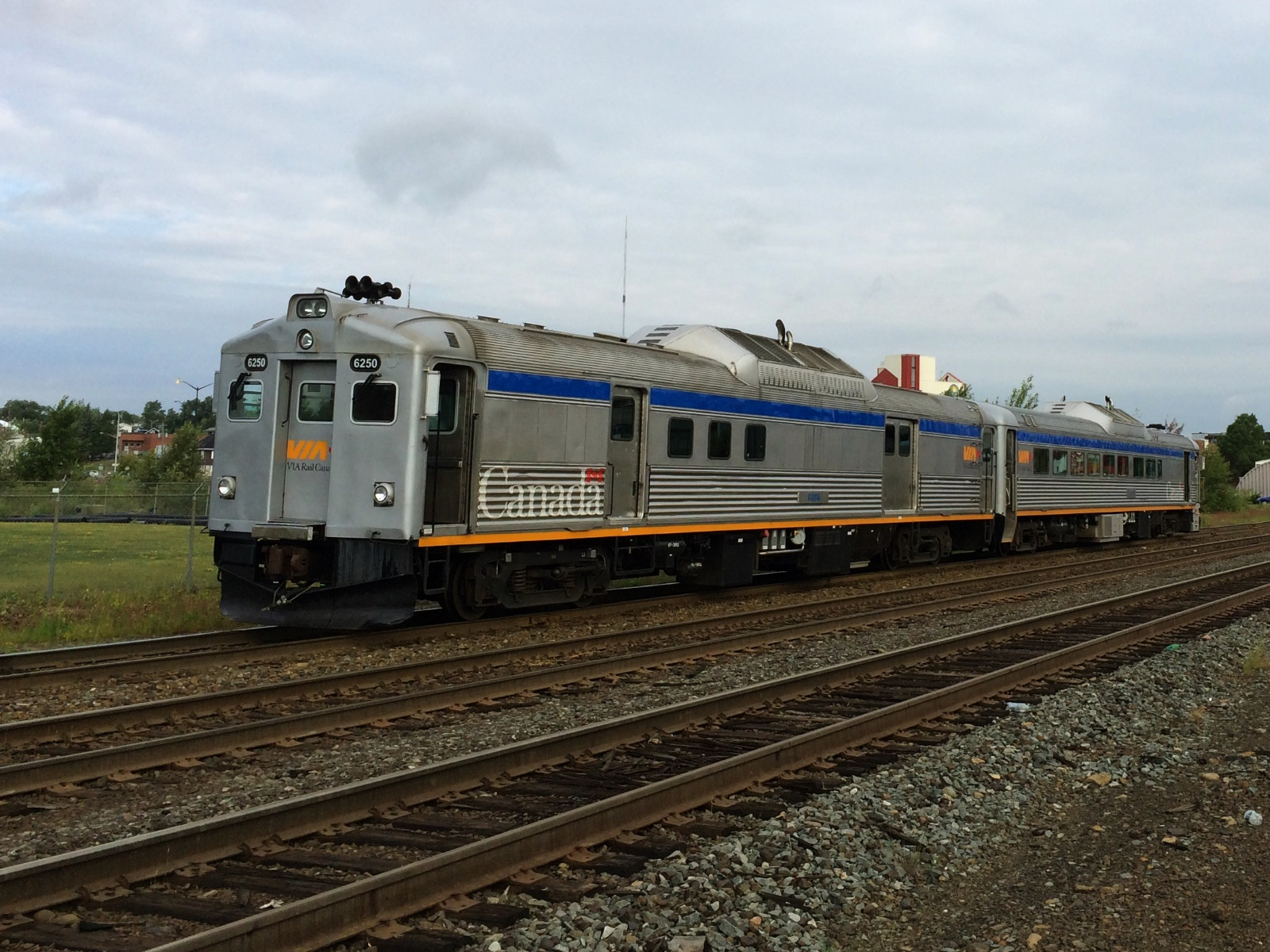
- VIA 185 in Sudbury, Ontario

Overview
- Service type: Regional rail
- Status: Operating
- Locale: Northern Ontario, Canada
- Current operator: Via Rail
- Former operator: Canadian Pacific Railway
- Ridership: 134 weekly (2025)
- Annual ridership: 6,965 (2025)

Route
- Termini: Sudbury; White River
- Distance travelled: 484 km (301 mi)
- Average journey time: Westbound: 8 hours and 5 minutes, Eastbound: 8 hours and 50 minutes
- Service frequency: 3 times per week
- Train number: 185, 186

On-board services
- Class: Economy

Technical
- Rolling stock: Budd Rail Diesel Car
- Track gauge: 1,435 mm (4 ft 8 1/2 in)
- Track owner: Canadian Pacific Railway

The Sudbury–White River train, formerly the Lake Superior, informally called the Budd Car, is a Canadian passenger train operated by Via Rail serving communities between Sudbury and White River, Ontario, three times a week. The timetable numbers for this train are 185 for the westbound (Sudbury–White River) and 186 for the eastbound (White River–Sudbury).

The train provides flag stop service to many remote locations accessible only by rail on the Canadian Pacific Kansas City mainline in Northern Ontario. Stops on the line include Amyot, Swanson, Franz, Lochalsh, Missanabie, Dalton, Nicholson, Chapleau, Nemegos, Kormak, Sultan, Biscotasing, Metagama and Benny.

The typical equipment used on this route is Budd Rail Diesel Cars, using an RDC-2 and RDC-4, with an extra car added when required, typically on the Victoria Day weekend.

The line figures in 2015 television series on the UK's Channel Five - Chris Tarrant – Extreme Railways. It is also featured in episode 8 of the TVO series Tripping, with a full three-hour documentary available online in 4K resolution.

While train services were disrupted due to the COVID-19 pandemic in Ontario, they returned to the normal three trains per week schedule in June 2022.

== Route ==
VIA Sudbury-White River
