= Unorganized North Sudbury District =

- Unorganized area
- Sudbury, Unorganized, North Part
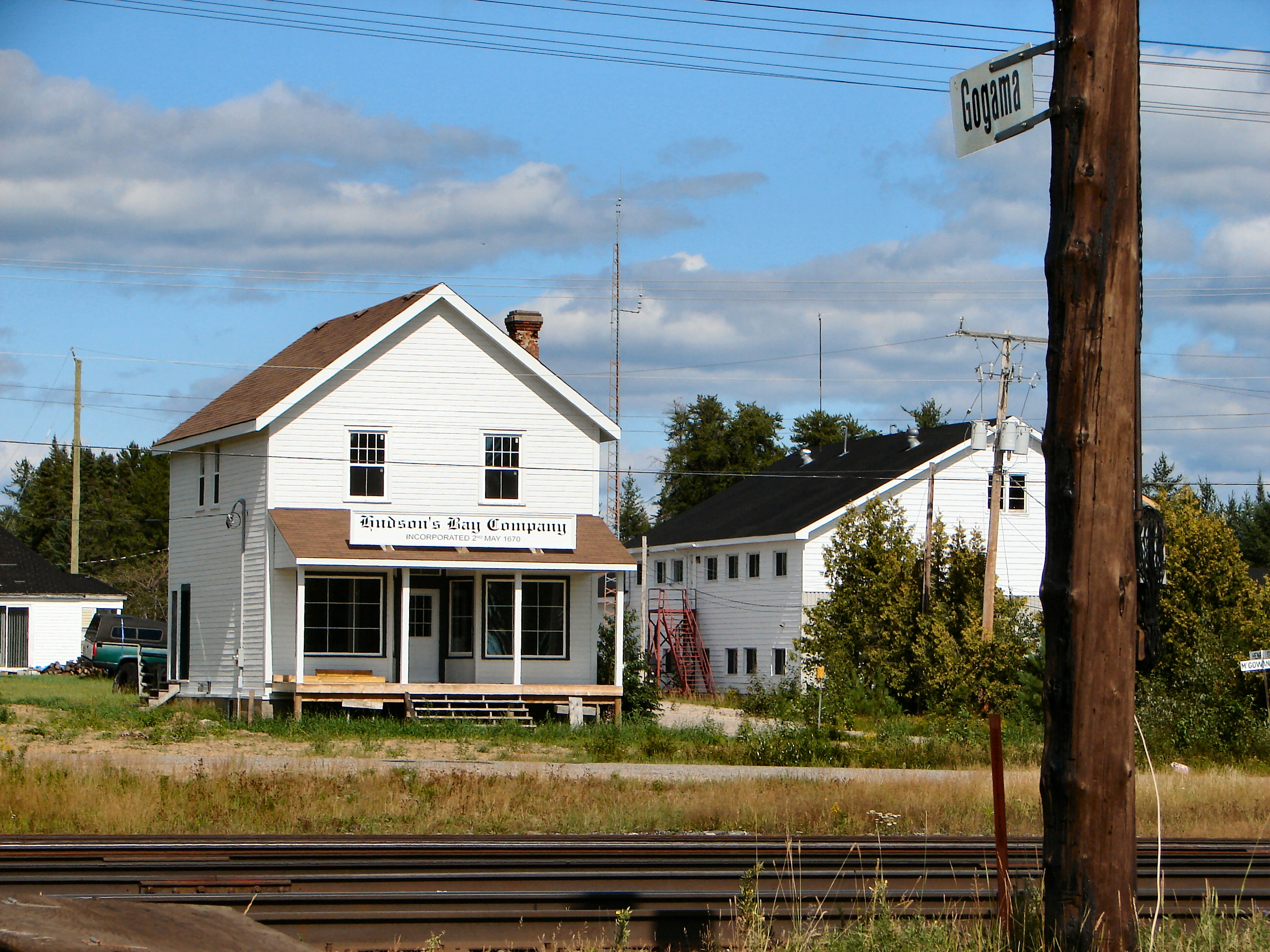
- Railstop and HBC store in Gogama

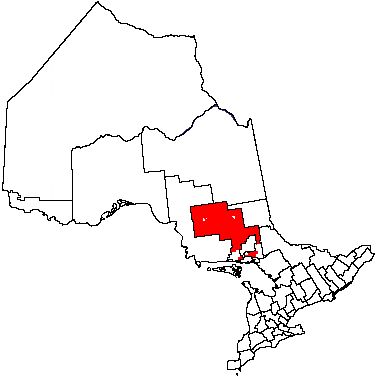
- Coordinates: 46°30′N 80°58′W
- Country: Canada
- Province: Ontario
- District: Sudbury

Government
  - MP: Marc Serré (Liberal), Carol Hughes (NDP)
  - MPP: France Gélinas (NDP), Michael Mantha (NDP)

Area
  - Land: 35,377.17 km^{2} (13,659.20 sq mi)

Population (2021)
  - Total: 2,902
  - Density: 0.1/km^{2} (0.26/sq mi)
- Time zone: UTC-5 (EST)
  - Summer (DST): UTC-4 (EDT)
- Postal code FSA: P0M
- Area code: 705

Unorganized North Sudbury District is an unorganized area in the Canadian province of Ontario, comprising all portions of the Sudbury District which are not organized into incorporated municipalities. Despite its name, there is no longer an accompanying "South Part", as that subdivision has been dissolved in 1999 and incorporated into municipalities, and Statistics Canada has not renamed the North Part.

The subdivision consists of three non-contiguous areas, totalling 35,377.17 square kilometres (13,659.20 sq mi), or about 92% of the district. It had a population of 2,902 in the 2021 Canadian census.

== Communities ==
- Benny
- Biscotasing
- Cartier
- Estaire
- Foleyet
- Gogama
- Mattagami
- Metagama
- Paget
- Shining Tree
- Sultan
- West River
- Westree
- Whitefish Falls
- Willisville

=== Ghost towns ===
- Burwash
- Jerome Mine
- Kormak
- Kukatush
- Nemegos
- Nicholson
- Ramsey

== Demographics ==
Canada census – Sudbury, Unorganized, North Part community profile

| | 2021 | 2016 | 2011 |
| Population | 2,902 (+7.6% from 2016) | 2,744 (+19.0% from 2011) | 2,306 (-4.5% from 2006) |
| Land area | 35,377.17 km^{2} (13,659.20 sq mi) | 35,595.62 km^{2} (13,743.55 sq mi) | 35,594.71 km^{2} (13,743.19 sq mi) |
| Population density | 0.1/km^{2} (0.26/sq mi) | 0.1/km^{2} (0.26/sq mi) | 0.1/km^{2} (0.26/sq mi) |
| Median age | 56.8 (M: 58.0, F: 56.0) | 55.6 (M: 56.2, F: 54.9) |
| Private dwellings | 2,837 (total) 1,367 (occupied) | 2,067 (total) 1,260 (occupied) | 1728 (total) |
| Median household income | $79,000 | $68,736 |

Notes: 2016 data based on revised population and dwelling counts.
References: 2021 2016 2011

Historical census populations – Unorganized North Sudbury District

| Year | Pop. | ±% |
|---|---|---|
| 1976 | 7,855 | — |
| 1981 | 7,741 | −1.5% |
| 1986 | 7,044 | −9.0% |
| 1991 | 7,463 | +5.9% |
| 1996 | 7,147 | −4.2% |

| Year | Pop. | ±% |
|---|---|---|
| 2001 | 2,910 | −59.3% |
| 2006 | 2,415 | −17.0% |
| 2011 | 2,306 | −4.5% |
| 2016 | 2,744 | +19.0% |
| 2021 | 2,902 | +5.8% |

2016 Population figure based on revised count. Population counts are not adjusted for boundary changes.
Source: Statistics Canada

Mother tongue (2021):

- English as first language: 65.6%
- French as first language: 28.2%
- English and French as first language: 2.2%
- Other as first language: 3.1%

== Transportation ==
Unorganized North Sudbury District is served by Via Rail at Gogama, Westree, Ruel, Felix, McKee's Camp, and Laforest.

Railway stations
- Current services at McKee's Camp station
  | Preceding station | Via Rail | Following station |
  |---|---|---|
  | Felix toward Vancouver | The Canadian | Laforest toward Toronto |
  Current services at Laforest station
  | Preceding station | Via Rail | Following station |
  | McKee's Camp toward Vancouver | The Canadian | Capreol toward Toronto |
  Former services at Laforest station
  | Preceding station | Canadian National Railway | Following station |
  | Thorlake toward Vancouver | Main Line | Raphoe toward Montreal |

== See also ==
- List of townships in Ontario
