= Mississagi =

Mississagi may refer to:

- Mississagi River—a river in Algoma and Sudbury Districts, Ontario, Canada
- Mississagi Strait—a narrow channel in Lake Huron
  - Mississagi Strait Lighthouse, a lighthouse on the western end of Manitoulin Island
- Mississagi Provincial Park—a natural environment-class park north of Elliot Lake
- Mississagi Island—an island in the North Channel of Lake Huron
- Mississagi River Provincial Park—a protected area on the Mississagi River in Algoma and Sudbury Districts, Ontario, Canada . ...
- Mississagi (ship, 1943), a self-unloading bulk carrier

== See also ==
- Mississauga (disambiguation)
