= Seymour Lake =

Seymour Lake or Seymour Lake may refer to:

== Lakes ==
In Canada:

- In Ontario
  - Seymour Lake (Algoma District)
  - Seymour Lake in Northumberland County at 44°23′06″N 77°48′35″W
  - Seymour Lake in Thunder Bay District at 50°24′26″N 88°23′40″W
- In British Columbia
  - Seymour Lake (Seymour River), north of Vancouver

In the United States:

- Lake Seymour (Minnesota)
- Seymour Lake (Vermont)

In Australia:

- In New South Wales
  - Seymour Lake in Holgate
