= Bull Lake (Varley Township) =

Lake in Algoma District, Ontario, Canada

- Location within Ontario
- Location: Algoma District, Ontario
- Coordinates: 46°33′08″N 83°08′03″W
- Primary inflows: Unnamed creeks from Bridge Lake and West Twin Lake
- Primary outflows: Bull Creek to the Little White River
- Basin countries: Canada
- Max. length: 0.51 km (0.32 mi)
- Max. width: 0.13 km (0.081 mi)
- Surface elevation: 303 m (994 ft)

Bull Lake is a lake in geographic Varley Township in Algoma District, Ontario, Canada. It is about 510 metres (1,673 ft) long and 310 metres (1,017 ft) wide, and lies at an elevation of 303 metres (994 ft). The primary inflows are unnamed creeks from Bridge Lake and West Twin Lake, and the primary outflow is Bull Creek, which flows into the Little White River, a tributary of the Mississagi River.

Bull Lake is about 31 kilometres (19 mi) north north east of the community of Iron Bridge.

A second Bull Lake in Algoma District, Bull Lake (Boon Township), lies 73 kilometres (45 mi) east southeast.

== See also ==
- List of lakes in Ontario
