= Drowned Land =

1912 oil sketch by Canadian painter Tom Thomson

- Burnt Country
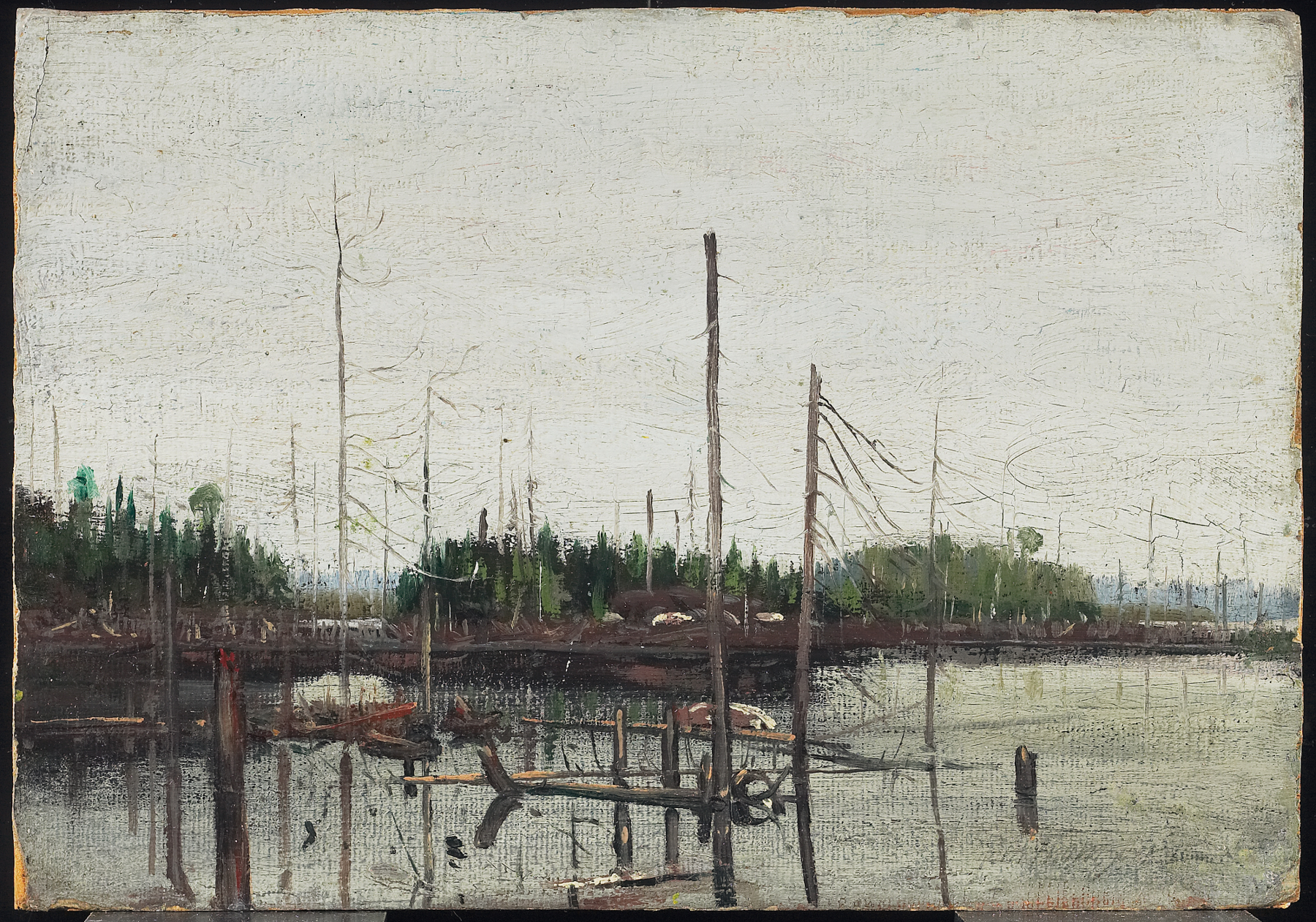
- Artist: Tom Thomson
- Year: Fall 1912
- Medium: Oil on paper (with embossed canvas texture) on plywood
- Dimensions: 17.5 cm × 25.1 cm (6 7/8 in × 9 7/8 in)
- Location: Art Gallery of Ontario; Toronto

Drowned Land is a 1912 oil sketch by the 20th-century Canadian painter Tom Thomson.

The work was painted in the fall of 1912, possibly on the Mississagi River. It depicts an area desolate and damaged due to flooding via damming. It was purchased by the Art Gallery of Ontario in Toronto in 1937 and has remained in the collection ever since. It was produced near the beginning of Thomson's short art career, just as he was beginning a transition from commercial art into full-time painting.

== Background ==
In 1912, after Thomson's initial experience of visiting Algonquin Park, he and his colleague William Broadhead went on a two-month expedition up the Spanish River and into Mississagi Forest Reserve (today Mississagi Provincial Park). Representative of typical Canadian attitudes towards the environment at that time, an article in the Owen Sound Sun reporting on Thomson's visit to the forest reserve wrote that "technology gave value to the landscape" and placed emphasis on the mineral, forest, water-power, and fish and game resources rather than on any scenic beauty the land possessed.

Thomson's transition from commercial art towards his original style of painting began to be apparent around this time. Much of his artwork from this trip, mainly oil sketches and photographs, has been lost due to two canoe spills experienced during the trip, the first spill being on Green Lake in a rain squall and the second in a series of rapids. In a letter to his friend M. J. (John) McRuer, Thomson wrote:

We started in at Bisco and took a long trip on the lakes around there going up the Spanish River and over into the Mississauga [Mississagi] water we got a great many good snapshots of game—mostly moose and some sketches, but we had a dump in the forty-mile rapids which is near the end of our trip and lost most of our stuff—we only saved 2 rolls of film out of about 14 dozen. Outside of that we had a peach of a time as the Mississauga is considered the finest canoe trip in the world... The weather has been very rotton [sic] all through our trip never dry for more than 24 hours at a time and sometimes raining for a week steady...

== Analysis ==
Thomson's art director while at Grip Ltd., Albert Robson, identified Drowned Land as being painted on the Mississagi Forest Reserve canoe trip. Art historian David Silcox has suggested that it was perhaps painted on Lake Scugog or near Owen Sound. It was painted with oil on paper, which was further embossed with canvas texture, all mounted on plywood. A similar support was used for View Over a Lake: Shore with Houses.

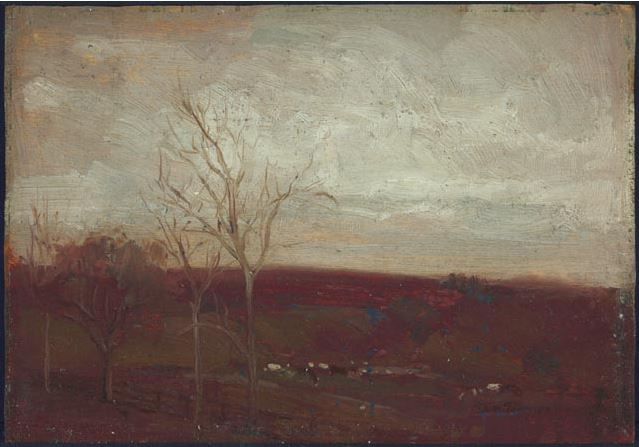
Near Owen Sound, November 1911. Sketch. (Note: "Sketch" indicates that the work is a smaller oil work, generally on wood panel. The dimensions are often close to 21.6 × 26.7 cm (8 1/2 × 10 1/2 in.) but sometimes as small as 12.8 × 18.2 cm (5 1/16 x 7 3/16 in.).) National Gallery of Canada, Ottawa

The painting came right as Thomson was transitioning from commercial art into fine art and indicates his innate talent. It is similar to a sketch from the previous year, Near Owen Sound, in terms of colour, drawing and texture. On display is a "camera-like precision" and his incredible attention to detail in capturing scenes. Indeed, David Silcox has speculated that Drowned Land as well as other paintings may have been completed with a photograph as a memory aid given their "uncanny precision". The painting is especially notable for its skill of composition and precision, especially when compared with some of Thomson's other work from this period, such as The Canoe and Old Lumber Dam, Algonquin Park. These early sketches show how he had not yet established his own form of expression, being particularly dark and dreary compared to his later work. The subject of desolation was uncommon for the time, having not been seen in Canadian painting since the works of topographers in the early-nineteenth century.

The painting, like others from this period, depicts ideal fishing territory that Thomson likely would have enjoyed. Many of his paintings were overt in their depictions of the lumber industry, including dams, pointers, alligators and drives, the presence of industry being on his mind from early on. Drowned Land however is more subtle as it does not directly display any logging equipment. Instead, it presents the damage caused by logging operations and flooding due to damming. A hopeful recovering growth is apparent in the distance behind the skeleton of trees in the foreground.

"Sketch" indicates that the work is a smaller oil work, generally on wood panel. The dimensions are often close to 21.6 × 26.7 cm (8 1/2 x 10 1/2 in.) but sometimes as small as 12.8 x 18.2 cm (5 1/16 x 7 3/16 in.).

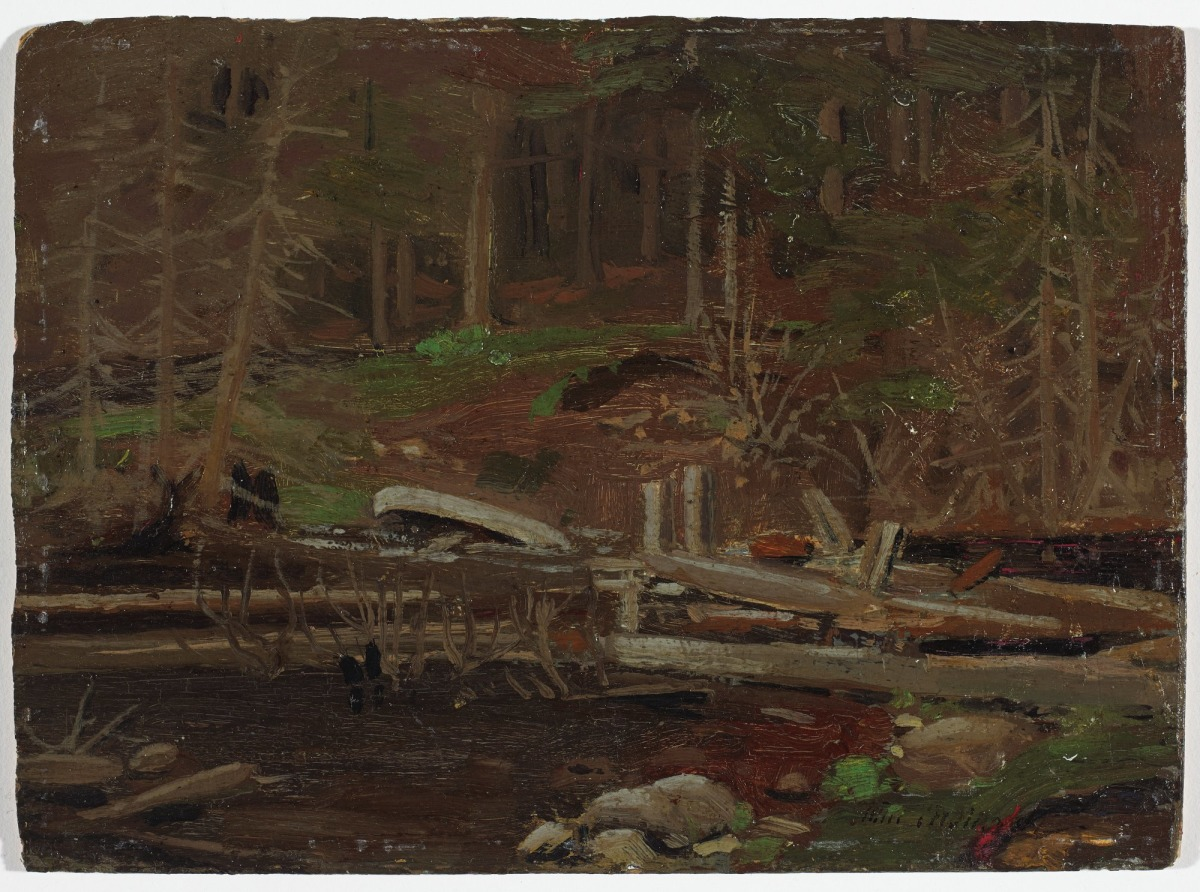
Old Lumber Dam, Algonquin Park, Spring 1912. Sketch. National Gallery of Canada, Ottawa

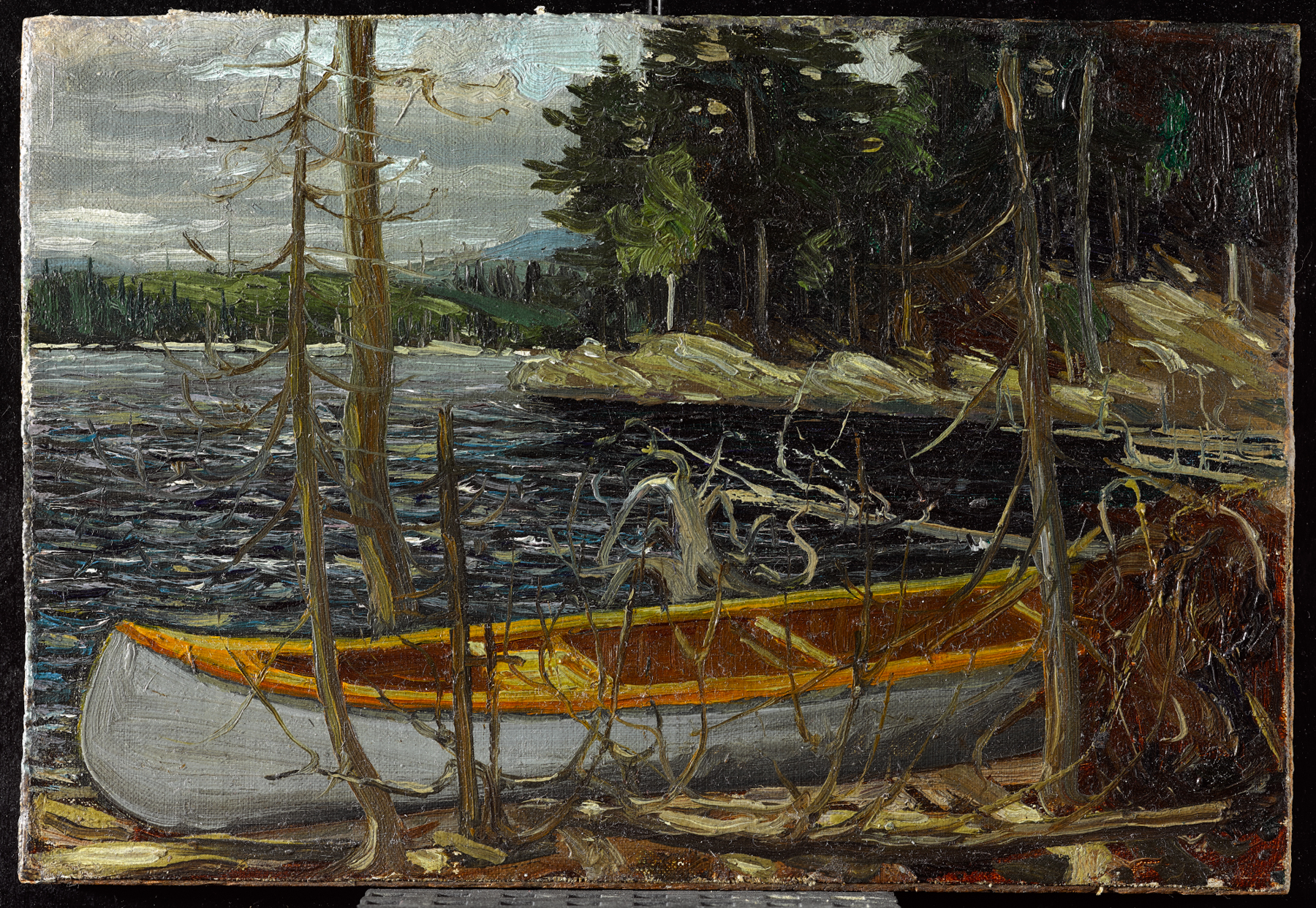
The Canoe, Spring or fall 1912. Sketch. Art Gallery of Ontario, Toronto

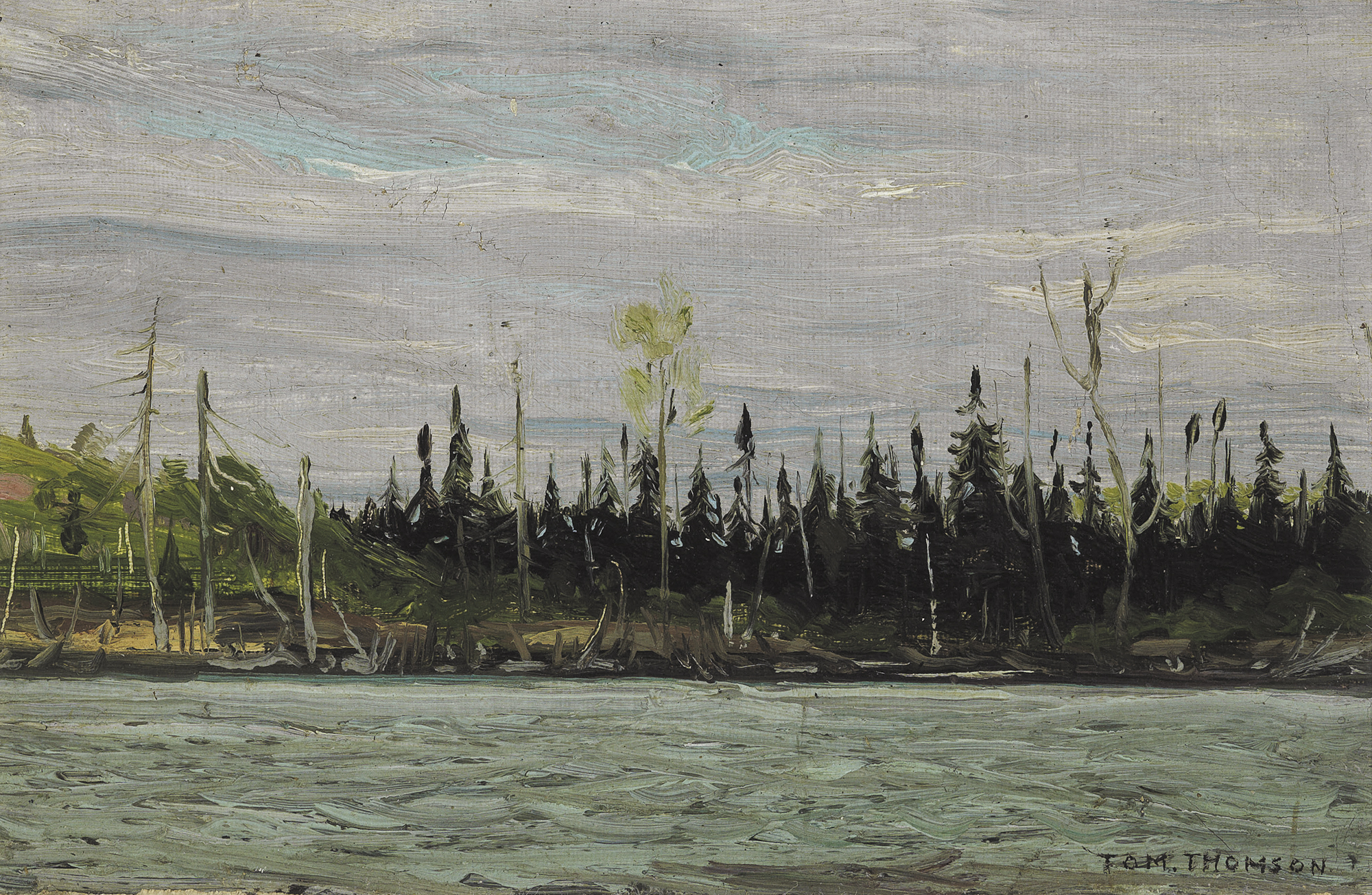
Mississagi, 1912. Sketch. Private collection

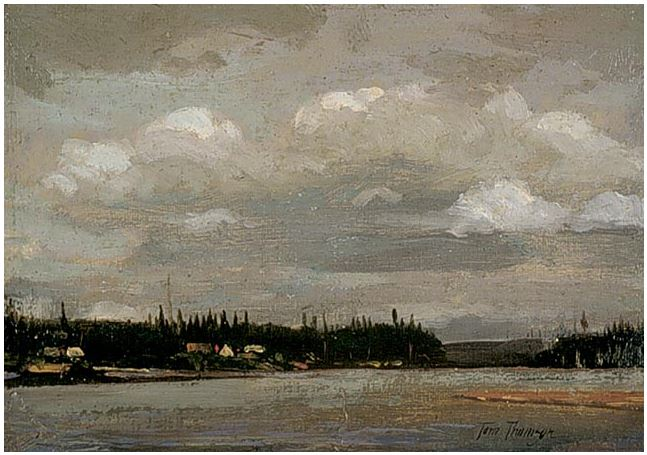
View Over a Lake: Shore with Houses, Summer 1912 or 1913. Sketch. National Gallery of Canada, Ottawa

== Provenance and exhibition ==
The painting was purchased by the Art Gallery of Ontario in 1937 from Mellors Fine Arts in Toronto and has remained in the AGO's collection ever since. It has been on display in several exhibitions since its purchase. (Note: Drowned Land has appeared in the following exhibitions: Mellors Galleries, Toronto, March 1937, no. 90; Elsie Perrin Williams Memorial Public Library & Art Museum, London, 9 January 1942, no. 44; Vancouver Art Gallery, Vancouver, 29 March–25 April 1954, no. 68; London Art Gallery, London, 6 July–6 September 1957, no. 38; Willistead Art Gallery, Windsor, 6 October–2 November 1957, no. 13; Rothman's Art Gallery of Stratford, Stratford, 4 August–3 September 1967, no. 16; Art Gallery of Ontario, Toronto, 30 October–12 December 1971, no. 4; Art Gallery of Algoma, Sault Ste. Marie, July 1982; National Gallery of Canada, Ottawa, 7 June–8 September 2002, no. 5; Vancouver Art Gallery, Vancouver, 5 October 2002–5 January 2003, no. 5; Musée du Québec, Quebec City, 6 February–3 April 2003, no. 5; Art Gallery of Ontario, Toronto, 30 May–7 September 2003, no. 5; Winnipeg Art Gallery, Winnipeg, 29 September–7 December 2003, no. 5; Hermitage Museum, Saint Petersburg, 10 September–14 November 2004, no. 2)
