= Rapid River =

Rapid River may refer to:

== Communities ==
- Rapid River, Michigan, Delta County
- Rapid River Township, Michigan, Kalkaska County
- Rapid River Township, Lake of the Woods County, Minnesota

== Rivers ==
=== U.S. ===
- Rapid River (Alaska-Yukon)
- Rapid River (Maine)
- Rapid River (Delta County, Michigan)
- Rapid River (Kalkaska County, Michigan)
- Rapid River (Ontonagon County, Michigan)
- Rapid River (Little Fork River tributary), Minnesota
- Rapid River (Rainy River tributary), Minnesota
- Rapid River (Washington)

=== Canada ===
- Rapid River (Alaska-Yukon)
- Rapid River (Algoma District), Ontario
- Rapid River (Sudbury District), Ontario
- Rapid River (British Columbia)
- Rapid River (Churchill River tributary), Saskatchewan
- Rapid River (Cree River tributary), Saskatchewan
- Rapides River, Côte-Nord region of Quebec, Canada.

== Other ==
- Namco Rapid River, arcade game

== See also ==
- Little Rapid River (disambiguation)
- Rapid River Township (disambiguation)
- Rapid River (Michigan)
