= Little White River =

Little White River can refer to:

- Little White River (Florida), drains into Escambia Bay
- Little White River (South Dakota), tributary of the White River
- Little White River (Indiana)
- Little White River (Ontario), tributary of the Mississagi River

== See also ==
- Little White Salmon River, Washington, tributary of the Columbia River
