= Ontario Highway 810 =

Ontario provincial highway

Highway 810

Route information
- Maintained by Ministry of Transportation of Ontario
- Length: 42.6 km (26.5 mi)
- Existed: November 20, 1974–present

Major junctions
- South end: Highway 553 at Bull Lake
- North end: Richie Falls

Location
- Country: Canada
- Province: Ontario
- Districts: Algoma

Highway system
- Ontario provincial highways; Current; Former; 400-series
← Highway 805	→ Highway 811
Former provincial highways
← Highway 809

Tertiary Highway 810, commonly referred to as Highway 810, is a provincially maintained access road, extending from Bull Lake to Richie Falls alongside the River aux Sables north of Massey. A northerly extension of Highway 553, the road was established in 1974 and has remained unchanged since then.

== Route description ==
Highway 810 is the southernmost tertiary highway in the province and is located approximately 100 kilometres (62 mi) west of Sudbury. A large portion of the route follows alongside the River aux Sables in River aux Sables Provincial Park. There is relatively little human habitation along Highway 810, owing to the extremely remote and rugged location. The highway begins 33.2 kilometres (20.6 mi) north of Highway 17, at Whisky Lake Road. At this point, Highway 553 ends and Highway 810 begins, travelling north through the Canadian Shield. As it snakes northward parallel with the River aux Sables, the route passes several resource access roads which travel even further into the wilderness. The highway ends at Ritchie Falls, 42.6 kilometres (26.5 mi) north of its southern terminus, north of which the roadway that carried it continues as a forest access road.

While the Ministry of Transportation is charged with maintaining Highway 810, the Public Transportation and Highway Improvement Act stipulates that this "does not include the clearing or removal of snow therefrom or the application of chemicals or abrasives to the icy surfaces thereof." Furthermore, the Ministry is "not liable for any damage sustained... using a tertiary road." Traffic levels along the route are low, with approximately 50 vehicles travelling it on an average day.

== History ==
The road that Highway 810 follows was originally opened as the Massey Tote Road by the Spanish River Lumber Company at the turn of the 20th century, and provided access for loggers between Lake Huron and logging sites on the River aux Sables, which the road closely paralleled. In early 1956, this road became Highway 553 as far north as Whisky Lake Road. A 42.6 kilometres (26.5 mi) northerly extension of Highway 553 was designated as Highway 810 on November 20, 1974. Since then, the highway has remained unchanged.

== Major intersections ==
The following table lists the major junctions along Highway 810, as noted by the Ministry of Transportation of Ontario. The entire route is located in Algoma District.

Location	km	mi	Destinations	Notes
Unorganized Algoma District	0.0	0.0	Highway 553 south – Massey; Whisky Lake Road	Highway 810 and Highway 553 share termini.
Richie Falls	42.6	26.5		Highway ends at river crossing
1.000 mi = 1.609 km; 1.000 km = 0.621 mi
