= Little Rapid River =

Little Rapid River may refer to:

- Little Rapid River (Michigan)
- Little Rapid River (Ontario)
- Little Rapid River (Tasmania), a tributary of Rapid River, Tasmania

== See also ==
- Rapid River (disambiguation)
