= River aux Sables =

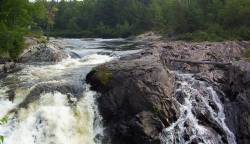
- Rapids on the River aux Sables in Chutes Provincial Park

- Location of the mouth of the River aux Sables in Ontario

Location
- Country: Canada
- Province: Ontario
- Districts: Sudbury; Algoma

Physical characteristics
- Source: Lac aux Sables
  - location: Algoma, Unorganized, North Part, Algoma District
  - coordinates: 46°50′19″N 82°21′42″W
  - elevation: 451 m (1,480 ft)
- Mouth: Spanish River
  - location: Sables-Spanish Rivers, Sudbury District
  - coordinates: 46°12′38″N 82°03′30″W
  - elevation: 178 m (584 ft)
- Length: 85 km (53 mi)

Basin features
- Tributaries
  - right: West River aux Sables

The River aux Sables, also known as the Aux Sables River and the Rivière aux Sables, is a river in Algoma and Sudbury Districts, Ontario, Canada, which flows from Lac aux Sables in Algoma District and empties into the Spanish River near the community of Massey.

The river is a well documented canoe route and notable for its free-flowing drainage and challenging whitewater. In particular, the southern portion of the river, with Class III and IV rapids, is renowned for white-water kayaking.

At one time, the river was used to transport logs to sawmills downstream. Just before its mouth, it flows through Chutes Provincial Park, which was named after chutes used to bypass rapids on this river. The river is now mainly used for recreational canoeing and kayaking.

Ontario Highway 810 follows the course of the river from Richie Falls in the north, south of Lac aux Sables, to Bull Lake in the south. Ontario Highway 553 continues south from there to Massey on Ontario Highway 17, first diverging from and then rejoining the river just north of Massey.

== Tributaries ==
- West River aux Sables

== River aux Sables Provincial Park ==
River aux Sables Provincial Park
- IUCN category II (national park)
- Interactive map of River aux Sables Provincial Park
- Coordinates: 46°27′11″N 82°10′48″W
- Length: 75 km (47 mi)
- Area: 3,423 ha (13.22 sq mi)
- Designation: Waterway
- Established: 2006
- Governing body: Ontario Parks

The River aux Sables Provincial Park protects the entire river and its banks with the exception of some private lands near the town of Massey. It was established in 2006 and is intended to provide recreational paddling opportunities. The park area is also popular for fishing, hunting, and camping.

The park is a natural corridor, abutting the Mississagi River Provincial Park Additions in the north, and linked to Chutes Provincial Park in the south. One notable feature of the park is the riparian wetland in Tennyson Township, which has a complex arrangement of oxbow ponds and abandoned river channels with a wide variety of aquatic and marsh vegetation, and is home to migratory and breeding marsh birds and waterfowl.

It is a non-operating park, meaning that there are no facilities or services.

== See also ==
- List of rivers of Ontario
