= Little Bull Lake (Algoma District) =

Lake in Algoma District, Ontario, Canada

- Location within Ontario
- Location: Algoma District, Ontario
- Coordinates: 46°26′18″N 82°12′49″W
- Primary inflows: Unnamed creek from Bull Lake
- Primary outflows: Unnamed creek to Burnett Lake
- Basin countries: Canada
- Max. length: 1.1 km (0.68 mi)
- Max. width: 0.31 km (0.19 mi)
- Surface elevation: 352 m (1,155 ft)

Little Bull Lake is a lake in Algoma District, Ontario, Canada. It is about 1.1 kilometres (0.7 mi) long and 0.31 kilometres (0.2 mi) wide, and lies at an elevation of 352 metres (1,155 ft). The primary inflow is an unnamed creek from Bull Lake, and the primary outflow is an unnamed creek to Burnett Lake, which flows via Low Creek into the West River aux Sables, a tributary of the River aux Sables.

Bull Lake is about 28 kilometres (17 mi) north of the community of Massey, where the River aux Sables joins the Spanish River.

== See also ==
- List of lakes in Ontario
