= Rapid River Township =

Rapid River Township is the name of two townships in the United States:

- Rapid River Township, Michigan
- Rapid River Township, Lake of the Woods County, Minnesota

See also

- Rapid River (disambiguation)
