= Little Bull Lake =

Little Bull Lake may refer to:

- Little Bull Lake (Algoma District), Ontario, Canada
- Little Bull Lake (Sudbury District), Ontario, Canada
