= Bolton River =

Bolton River may refer to:

- Bolton River (Manitoba), a river in the Hudson Bay drainage basin in Northern Region, Manitoba
- Bolton River (Ontario), a river near the community of Iron Bridge in Huron Shores, Algoma District, Ontario
