= Bull Lake (Boon Township, Ontario) =

Lake in Algoma District, Ontario, Canada

- Location within Ontario
- Location: Algoma District, Ontario
- Coordinates: 46°25′58″N 82°11′24″W
- Primary outflows: Unnamed creek to Little Bull Lake
- Basin countries: Canada
- Max. length: 2 km (1.2 mi)
- Max. width: 0.65 km (0.40 mi)
- Surface elevation: 357 m (1,171 ft)

Bull Lake is a lake in geographic Boon Township in Algoma District, Ontario, Canada. It is about 2 kilometres (1.2 mi) long and 0.65 kilometres (0.4 mi) wide, and lies at an elevation of 357 metres (1,171 ft). The primary outflow is an unnamed creek to Little Bull Lake, which flows into Burnett Lake and then via Low Creek into the West River aux Sables, a tributary of the River aux Sables.

Bull Lake is about 28 kilometres (17 mi) north of the community of Massey, where the River aux Sables joins the Spanish River. Highway 553 travels from Massey to Bull Lake, and Highway 810 continues from that point further north to Richie Falls.

A second Bull Lake in Algoma District, Bull Lake (Varley Township), lies 73 kilometres (45 mi) west northwest.

== See also ==
- List of lakes in Ontario
