= Mississagi Island =

Island in Ontario, Canada

Coordinates: 46°06′40″N 83°00′29″W

Mississagi Island is an island in the North Channel of Lake Huron in Algoma District, Ontario, Canada, about 6.3 kilometres (3.9 mi) south of the mouth of the Mississagi River and 9.0 kilometres (5.6 mi) southwest of the community of Blind River. The island is about 1.4 kilometres (0.9 mi) long by 0.8 kilometres (0.5 mi) wide. A rocky ledge extending from North Point forms the north end, while Dog Point is the northeastern tip. The island is forested, and has two small ponds. There was a lighthouse on the island from 1884 until 1948 when it burned down.
