= Mississauga (disambiguation) =

Mississauga is a city in Ontario, Canada.

Mississauga may also refer to:

== Mississauga nations in Ontario ==
- Mississaugas, a group of First Nations peoples in Southern Ontario
  - Mississauga First Nation
  - Mississaugas of the Credit First Nation
  - Mississaugas of Scugog Island First Nation

== Other uses ==
- University of Toronto Mississauga, a campus of the University of Toronto

== See also ==
- Mississagi (disambiguation)
- Massasauga
