= Bolton River (Ontario) =

- Location of the mouth of the Bolton River in Ontario

Location
- Country: Canada
- Province: Ontario
- District: Algoma District
- Municipality: Huron Shores

Physical characteristics
- Source: Bright Lake
  - coordinates: 46°15′01″N 83°15′51″W
  - elevation: 181 m (594 ft)
- Mouth: Mississagi River
  - coordinates: 46°15′37″N 83°12′50″W
  - elevation: 173 m (568 ft)
- Length: 5.4 km (3.4 mi)

The Bolton River is a river near the community of Iron Bridge in Huron Shores, Algoma District, Ontario, Canada. It is 5.4 kilometres (3 mi) long and begins at Bright Lake at an elevation of 181 metres (594 ft). It takes in an unnamed creek from Dean lake at 46°15′27″N 83°13′31″W at an elevation of 174 metres (571 ft), and empties into the Mississagi River at an elevation of 173 metres (568 ft).

== See also ==
- List of rivers of Ontario
