= Grindstone Creek (Algoma District) =

- Location of the mouth of Grindstone Creek in Ontario

Location
- Country: Canada
- Province: Ontario
- Region: Northeastern Ontario
- District: Algoma

Physical characteristics
- Source: Unnamed lake
  - location: Rioux Township
  - coordinates: 46°43′42″N 83°17′36″W
  - elevation: 436 m (1,430 ft)
- Mouth: Mississagi River
  - location: Dagle Township
  - coordinates: 46°41′03″N 83°22′34″W
  - elevation: 300 m (980 ft)

Basin features
- River system: Great Lakes Basin

Grindstone Creek is a stream in the Unorganized North Part of Algoma District in Northeastern Ontario, Canada. It is in the Great Lakes Basin and is a left tributary of the Mississagi River.

== Course ==
The stream begins at an unnamed lake in geographic Rioux Township. It flows southwest to another unnamed lake and continues southwest into Upper Grindstone Lake. The lake trends southwest into the northwest corner of geographic Wagg Township; the creek then flows southwest into Grindstone Lake. The lake trends southwest into geographic Dagle Township. Grindstone Creek leaves Grindstone Lake at the southwest, continues in a southwest direction, passes under Ontario Highway 129, and reaches its mouth at the Mississagi River. The Mississagi River flows to the North Channel on Lake Huron.

== See also ==
- List of rivers of Ontario
