= Huron Shores =

- Municipality (single-tier)
- Municipality of Huron Shores
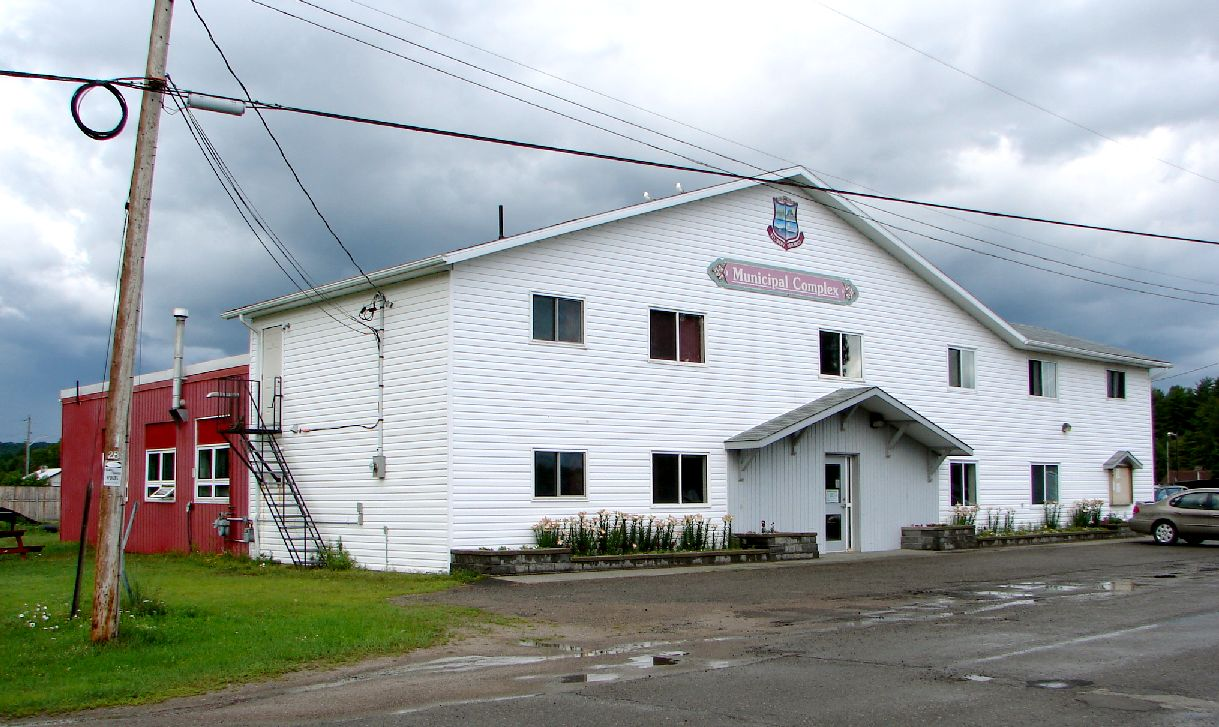
- Municipal building in Iron Bridge

- Location within Ontario
- Coordinates: 46°17′N 83°12′W
- Country: Canada
- Province: Ontario
- District: Algoma
- Established: January 1, 1999

Government
  - Type: Town
  - Mayor: Jane Armstrong
  - MP: Terry Sheehan (Liberal)
  - MPP: Bill Rosenberg (PC)

Area
  - Land: 451.87 km^{2} (174.47 sq mi)

Population (2021)
  - Total: 1,860
  - Density: 4.1/km^{2} (11/sq mi)
- Time zone: UTC-5 (EST)
  - Summer (DST): UTC-4 (EDT)
- Postal code: P0R 1H0
- Area code(s): 705
- Website: www.huronshores.ca

Huron Shores is a municipality in the Canadian province of Ontario, located along the North Channel of Lake Huron in the Algoma District.

The municipality was created on January 1, 1999, through the amalgamation of the former Township of Thessalon, Township of Thompson, Townships of Day and Bright Additional, and the former village of Iron Bridge. Huron Shores also surrounds the town of Thessalon and the Thessalon First Nation, but neither are part of the municipality.

== Communities ==
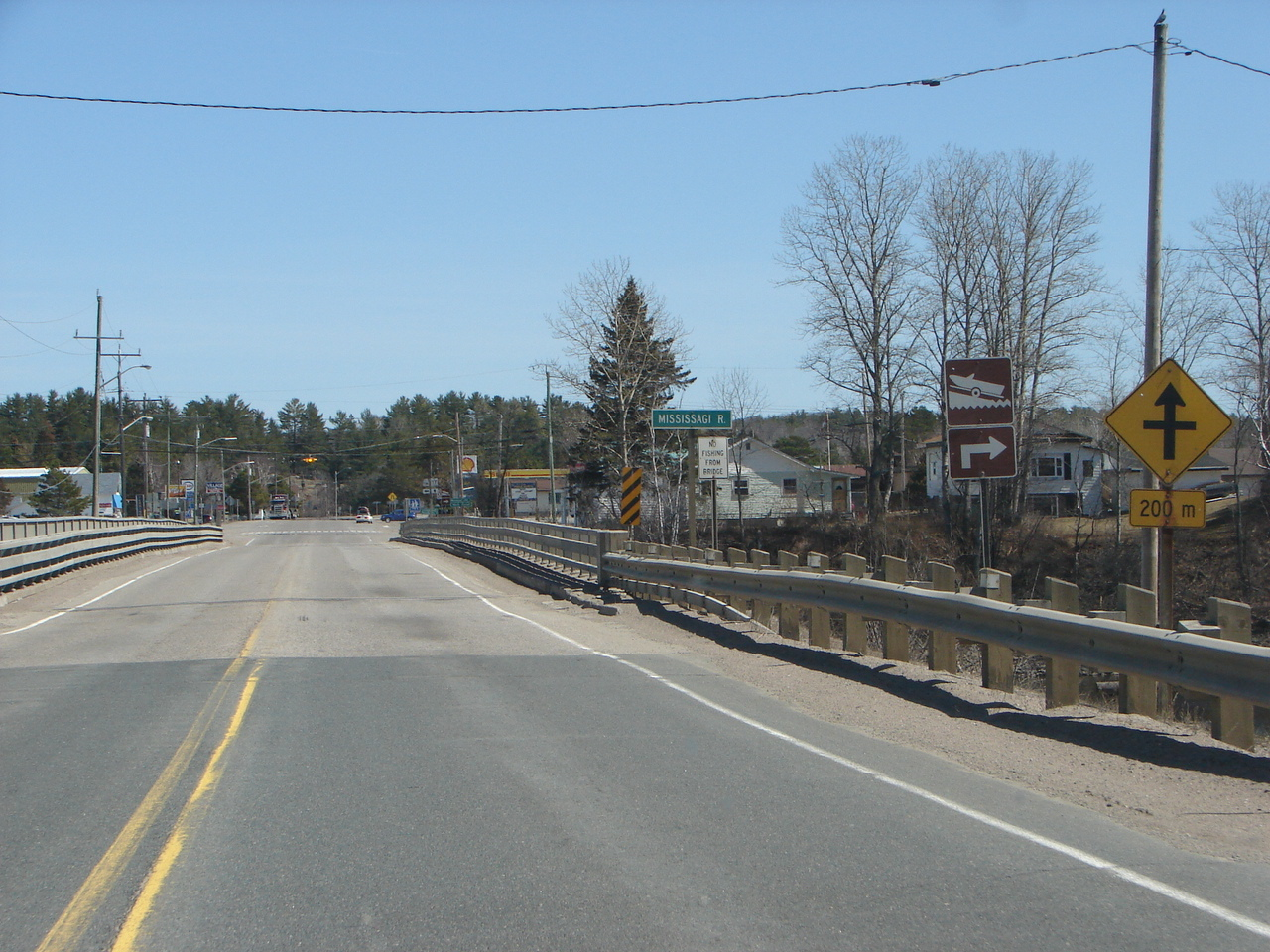
Highway 17 and bridge over the Mississagi River in Iron Bridge.

The main communities in the township are Iron Bridge, Sowerby and Little Rapids. Smaller communities include Ansonia, Day Mills, Dayton, Dean Lake, Eley, Livingstone, Livingstone Creek, Maple Ridge, Nestorville, Sherwood and Sunset Beach.

The municipality offices are located in Iron Bridge, which was originally named Tally-Ho for the call that the lumberjacks would make upon reaching a trading post. In 1886, the village was renamed after the then newly-built steel bridge built over the Mississagi River. Its most notable tourist attractions are its snowmobile trails, nearby wilderness areas for hunting and fishing, and the Voyageur Hiking Trail, which passes through the village.

As a formerly independent village, Iron Bridge retains the status of designated place in Canadian censuses. It had a population of 632 in the Canada 2011 Census, up from 614 in the 2006 census.

== Demographics ==
In the 2021 Census of Population conducted by Statistics Canada, Huron Shores had a population of 1,860 living in 834 of its 1,171 total private dwellings, a change of 11.8% from its 2016 population of 1,664. With a land area of 451.87 km^{2} (174.47 sq mi), it had a population density of 4.1/km^{2} (10.7/sq mi) in 2021.

Canada census – Huron Shores community profile

	2021	2016	2011
Population	1,860 (+11.8% from 2016)	1,664 (-3.4% from 2011)	1,723 (+1.6% from 2006)
Land area	451.87 km^{2} (174.47 sq mi)	457.35 km^{2} (176.58 sq mi)	455.59 km^{2} (175.90 sq mi)
Population density	4.1/km^{2} (11/sq mi)	3.6/km^{2} (9.3/sq mi)	3.8/km^{2} (9.8/sq mi)
Median age	56.4 (M: 56.4, F: 56.4)	48.7 (M: 49.1, F: 48.3)
Private dwellings	1,171 (total) 834 (occupied)	1,253 (total)	1,258 (total)
Median household income	$67,500	$55,552

References: 2021 2016 2011

Historical census populations – Huron Shores
Year	Pop.	±%
2001	1,794	—
2006	1,696	−5.5%
2011	1,723	+1.6%
2016	1,664	−3.4%
2021	1,860	+11.8%
Source: Statistics Canada

Population prior to amalgamation:

- Population total in 1996: 1,877
  - Day and Bright Additional: 217
  - Iron Bridge: 777
  - Thessalon: 758
  - Thompson: 125
- Population in 1991:
  - Day and Bright Additional: 249
  - Iron Bridge: 823
  - Thessalon: 771
  - Thompson: 119

Mother tongue (2021):

- English as first language: 87.6%
- French as first language: 4.6%
- English and French as first languages: 0.5%
- Other as first language: 6.7%

== Recreation ==
The municipality has numerous recreation centres and community halls which are used frequently for local events. These centres are located throughout the municipality and include:

- Thessalon Township Community Centre
- Little Rapids Gazebo and Ballpark softball field with gazebo shelter
- Sowerby Hall
- Historic Cordukes/Weber 12-Sided Barn
- Iron Bridge Recreation Centre (Arena)
- Thompson Hall Community Gym

Many of these community centres have significant historical connections. The Thessalon Township Community Centre is the former Little Rapids one-room school house. The Cordukes/Weber 12-Sided Barn is one of only three 12-sided barns in Canada. It was originally built in 1919 and was restored and relocated to its present site in 2010.

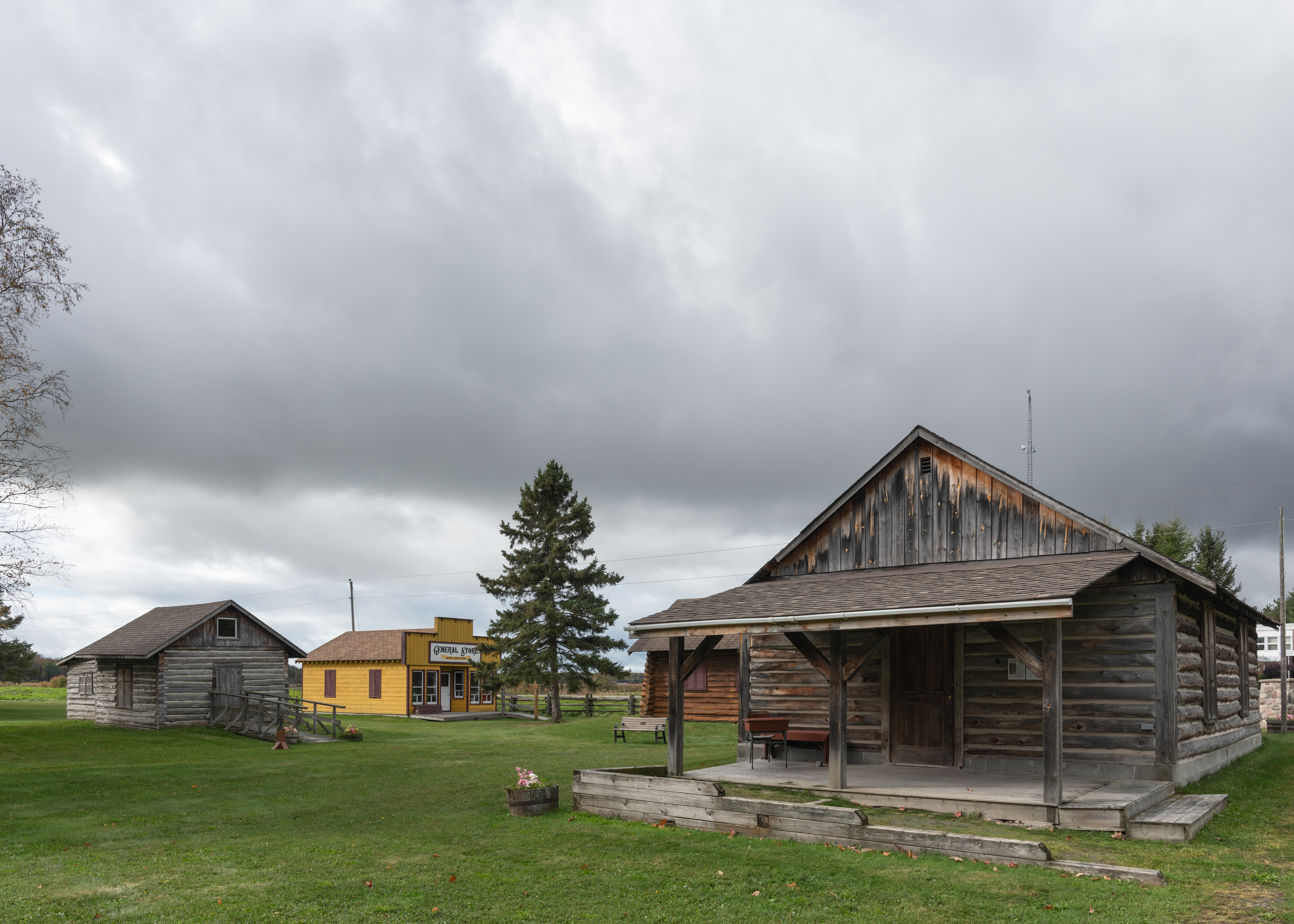
Heritage Park Museum, Little Rapids

Huron Shores is home to two museums: the Iron Bridge Historical Museum in Iron Bridge and the Heritage Park Museum in Little Rapids. The Iron Bridge Historical Museum is dedicated to preserving the heritage of the town and the surrounding communities which make up Huron Shores. The museum is open seasonally in July and August and consists of a number of historical buildings from the area including two pioneer log houses. The Heritage Park Museum was established in 1977 to preserve the heritage of the Huron Shores region. The heritage site is open in July and August and is well known locally for its annual county fair and auction which occurs every civic holiday weekend. The Museum is operated by the Thessalon Township Heritage Committee, a committee within the municipality of Huron Shores.

There is a substantial farming community in Huron Shores. During the summer months many local farmers and food producers participate in local farmers' markets held at the 12-sided Round Barn heritage site and the Iron Bridge Historical Museum.

The municipality is also home to a number of publicly accessible lakes and rivers. The outdoors are one of the main attractions of the area with many visitors coming to the area to fish, hunt, or enjoy the water. It includes several islands, including Clinton Island.

== See also ==
- List of francophone communities in Ontario
- List of townships in Ontario
