= Chutes Provincial Park =

Provincial park in Ontario, Canada

- IUCN category II (national park)
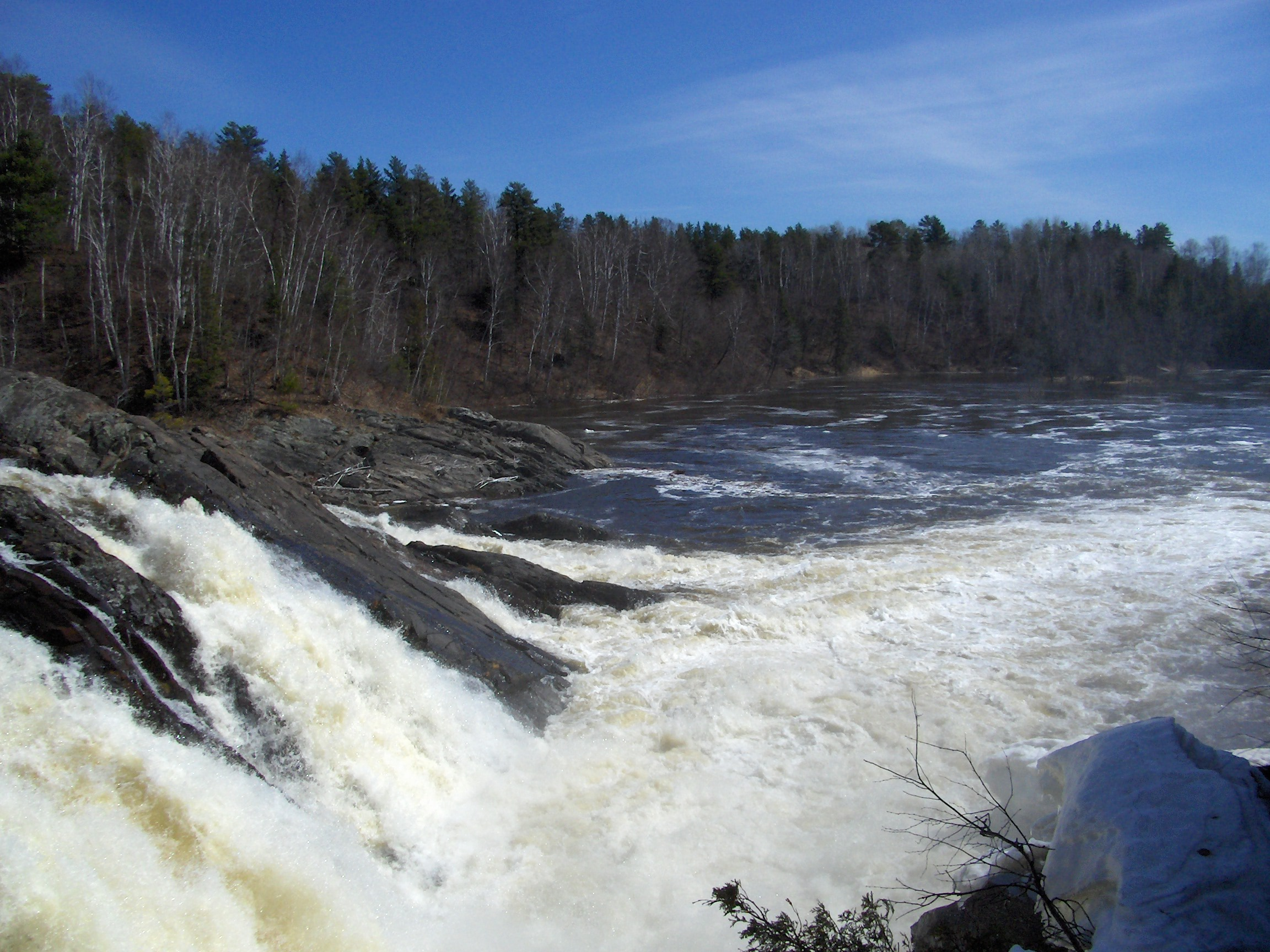
- The waterfalls as seen from the viewing platform in the spring

- Location within Ontario
- Interactive map of Chutes Provincial Park
- Location: Massey, Ontario, Canada
- Coordinates: 46°13′19″N 82°4′19″W
- Area: 108.32 ha (267.7 acres)
- Designation: Recreational
- Established: 1970
- Visitors: 48,742 (in 2022)
- Governing body: Ontario Parks
- Website: www.ontarioparks.com/park/chutes

Chutes Provincial Park is a recreation class provincial park in Sables-Spanish Rivers, Ontario, Canada, near the community of Massey. The park is named after a logging chute that diverted logs around the waterfall on the River aux Sables. The waterfall is considered the main attraction at the park, along with the Seven Sisters Rapids found upstream from the waterfall.

Unlike many other provincial parks, its proximity to Massey allows the park to use the municipal water supply, meaning that water does not have to be boiled before drinking.

The park's facilities include 130 campsites, of which 79 are serviced with electricity. It has a 6 kilometres (3.7 mi) hiking trail with views of scenic waterfalls and river gorge.

Chutes Provincial Park spans both sides of the River aux Sables, protecting a 3 kilometres (1.9 mi) section of the river. It consists of 2 zones: a 20 hectares (49 acres) Development Zone on the west side of the river; and a Natural Environment Zone occupying the northern part and east side of the river. Park features include wetlands, rock lands, floodplains, and terraces. The campground is forested with red pine and jackpine, while on the east side of the river, there is a mixture of poplar, maple, spruce, and white pine. Upstream of this park, the river is protected in the River aux Sables Provincial Park.
