= Rapid River (Michigan) =

Rapid River may refer to the following streams in the U.S. state of Michigan:

- Rapid River (Delta County, Michigan)
- Rapid River (Kalkaska County, Michigan)
- Rapid River (Ontonagon County, Michigan)

== See also ==
- Rapid River, Michigan, a community in Delta County
- Rapid River Township, Michigan, Kalkaska County
- Rapid River (disambiguation)
