= Lee Valley, Ontario =

Unincorporated community in the Canadian province of Ontario

Coordinates: 46°12′23″N 81°56′27″W

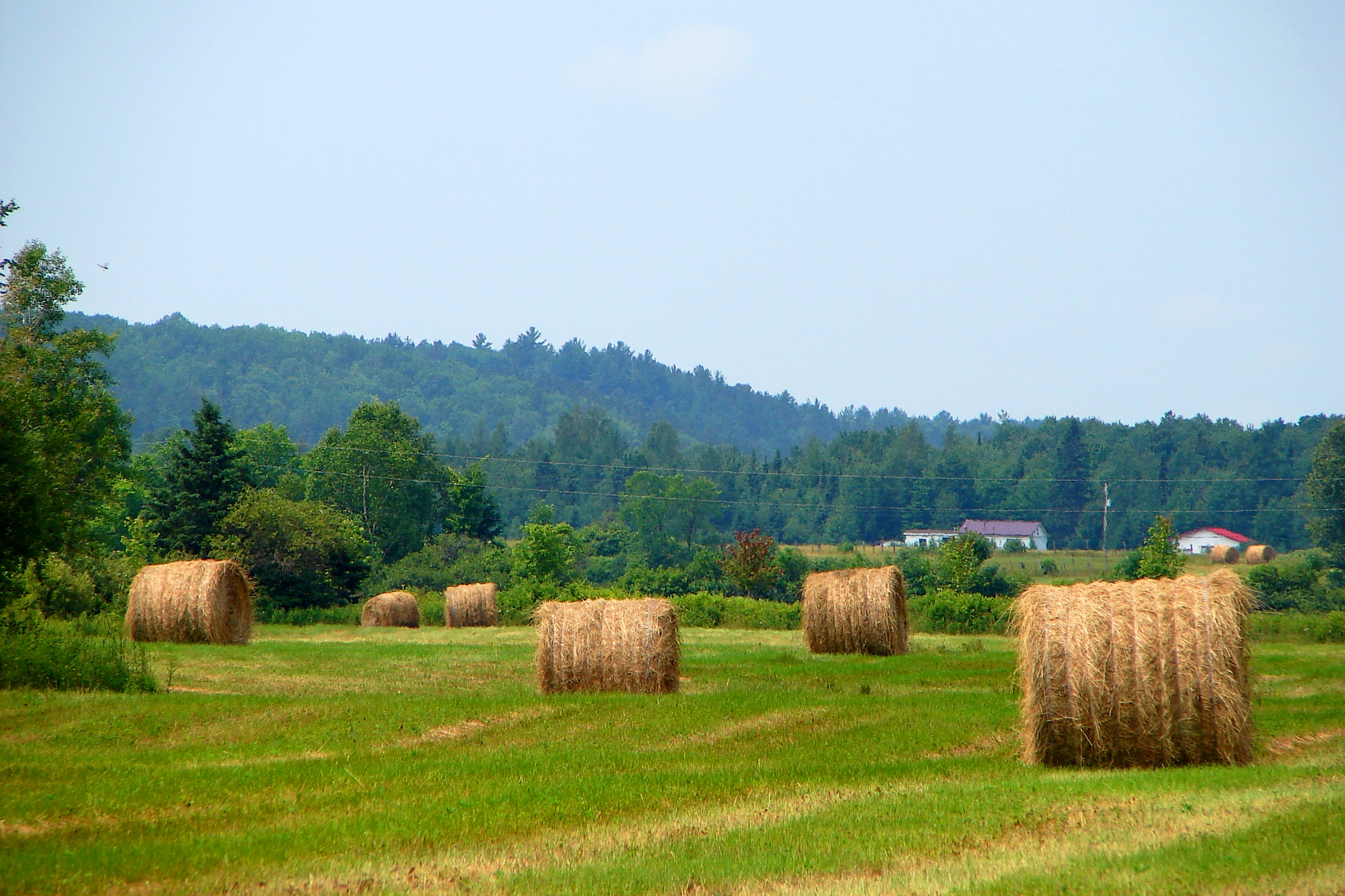
Lee Valley

Lee Valley is an unincorporated community in the Canadian province of Ontario. Located in the Sudbury District, the rural area is divided between the town of Espanola and the municipality of Sables-Spanish Rivers.

== Demographics ==
In the 2021 Census of Population conducted by Statistics Canada, Lee Valley had a population of 242 living in 108 of its 111 total private dwellings, a change of -50.7% from its 2016 population of 491. With a land area of 3.15 km^{2} (1.22 sq mi), it had a population density of 76.8/km^{2} (199.0/sq mi) in 2021.
