= Little Rapid River (Ontario) =

Location
- Country: Canada
- Province: Ontario
- District: Algoma

Physical characteristics
- Source: Unnamed pond
  - coordinates: 46°48′17″N 83°04′32″W
  - elevation: 447 m (1,467 ft)
- Mouth: Rapid River
  - coordinates: 46°45′26″N 83°14′46″W
  - elevation: 409 m (1,342 ft)
- Length: 18.2 km (11.3 mi)

The Little Rapid River is a river in Algoma District, Ontario, Canada. The river begins at an unnamed pond at an elevation of 447 metres (1,467 ft), travels about 18.2 kilometres (11.3 mi), and reaches its mouth at the Rapid River, just downstream of Seymour Lake, at an elevation of 409 metres (1,342 ft).

== See also ==
- Rapid River (disambiguation)
- List of rivers of Ontario
