= Rapid River (Algoma District) =

Location
- Country: Canada
- Province: Ontario
- District: Algoma

Physical characteristics
- Source: Seymour Lake
  - coordinates: 46°45′27″N 83°13′56″W
  - elevation: 410 m (1,350 ft)
- Mouth: Mississagi River
  - coordinates: 46°44′37″N 83°23′53″W
  - elevation: 314 m (1,030 ft)
- Length: 15 km (9.3 mi)

Basin features
- Tributaries
  - right: Little Rapid River

The Rapid River is a river in Algoma District, Ontario, Canada. The river is about 15 kilometres (9 mi) long and begins at Seymour Lake at an elevation of 410 metres (1,345 ft). It travels west and takes in its left tributary the Little Rapid River at an elevation of 408 metres (1,339 ft). The river continues west over a small rapids and a waterfall before emptying into the Mississagi River at an elevation of 314 metres (1,030 ft). A road, which begins at Highway 129 north of the river's mouth, parallels the majority of the river to Seymour Lake.

== See also ==
- List of rivers of Ontario
