= Lake Seymour (Minnesota) =

Lake in the state of Minnesota, United States

- Location within Minnesota
- Location: Martin County, Minnesota
- Coordinates: 43°42′21″N 94°42′8″W
- Type: lake

Lake Seymour is a lake in Martin County, Minnesota.

Lake Seymour was named for W. S. Seymour, an early settler.

== See also ==
- List of lakes in Minnesota
