= Little White River (Ontario) =

- Location of the mouth of the river in Ontario

Location
- Country: Canada
- Province: Ontario
- Region: Northeastern Ontario
- District: Algoma
- Part: Unorganized North

Physical characteristics
- Source: Unnamed lake
  - location: Fabbro Township
  - coordinates: 46°48′14″N 82°32′37″W
  - elevation: 489 m (1,604 ft)
- Mouth: Mississagi River
  - location: Wells Township
  - coordinates: 46°22′54″N 83°20′02″W
  - elevation: 213 m (699 ft)

Basin features
- River system: Great Lakes Basin

The Little White River is a river in the Unorganized North Part of Algoma District in Northeastern Ontario, Canada. It is in the Great Lakes Basin and is a left tributary of the Mississagi River.

== Geography ==
The river begins at an unnamed lake in geographic Fabbro Township. It heads southwest through Sixpack Lake and then under Ontario Highway 546, from which point the highway follows the river valley, where it takes in the left tributary Sister River and the right tributary Kindiogami River. It loops back and forth under the highway, continues southwest, takes in the left tributary Boland River and right tributary West Little White River, passes under Ontario Highway 554, and reaches its mouth at the Mississagi River at geographic Wells Township southeast of the community Wharncliffe. The Mississagi River flows to the North Channel on Lake Huron.

=== Tributaries ===
- Casselman's Creek (left)
- Kynoch Creek (right)
- West Little White River (right)
- Boland River (left)
- Kindiogami River (right)
- Sister River (left)

== Little White River Provincial Park ==
Little White River Provincial Park
- IUCN category II (national park)
- Interactive map of Little White River Provincial Park
- Coordinates: 46°33′43″N 83°02′31″W
- Length: 100 km (62 mi)
- Area: 12,782 ha (49.35 sq mi)
- Designation: Waterway
- Established: 2002
- Governing body: Ontario Parks

The Little White River Provincial Park is a waterway park that protects a 100 kilometres (62 mi) long section of the river and its banks, from approximately the northern terminus of Secondary Highway 639 to its confluence with the Mississagi River. Additionally it includes the entire West Little White River and its headwater lakes (such as Pointer, Finn, Town Line, Robb, Elbow, Kirkpatrick, White Bear, and Endikai Lakes), as well as Raven Lake Uplands that stretches to the Wakomata portion of the Mississagi River Provincial Park. It was established in 2002 and provides canoe camping and fishing opportunities.

Features in the park include wetlands, oxbow sloughs, and floodplain swamps with stands of silver maple, black ash, and white elm. The Raven Lake natural heritage area contains bedrock cliff faces, upland rock barrens, deep gorges, ravines, convoluted linear wetlands, and significant stands of white pine growing on the glacier-scoured hills. The park forms a natural corridor between several natural heritage areas, such as the Mississagi River Provincial Park, the Kirkpatrick Lake enhanced management area, and the Endekai Perched Delta enhanced management area.

It is a non-operating park, meaning that there are no facilities or services.

== See also ==
- List of rivers of Ontario

== Sources ==
- Map 12 (PDF) (Map). 1 : 1,600,000. Official road map of Ontario. Ministry of Transportation of Ontario. 2014.
- Restructured municipalities - Ontario map #4 (Map). Restructuring Maps of Ontario. Ontario Ministry of Municipal Affairs and Housing. 2006.
