= List of secondary highways in Sudbury District =

List of Ontario secondary highways

This is a list of secondary highways in Sudbury District, most of which serve as logging roads or provide access to provincial parks and isolated areas in the Sudbury District of northeastern Ontario.

== Highway 553 ==
Highway 553
- Imperial Street, Massey Tote Road

Route information
- Maintained by Ministry of Transportation of Ontario
- Length: 31.7 km (19.7 mi)

Major junctions
- South end: Highway 17 in Massey
- North end: Highway 810 at Bull Lake

Location
- Country: Canada
- Province: Ontario
- Municipalities: Sables-Spanish Rivers

Highway system
- Ontario provincial highways; Current; Former; 400-series
← Highway 552	→ Highway 554

Secondary Highway 553, commonly referred to as Highway 553, is a provincially maintained highway in the Canadian province of Ontario. The highway is short, and spans only 31.7 km (19.7 mi). Its only purpose is to connect the Highway 17, the Trans Canada Highway, in the community of Massey (township of Sables-Spanish Rivers) to logging areas and provincial parks north of the community.

At the northern terminus of Highway 553 at Bull Lake, the roadway continues as tertiary Highway 810. The route of Highway 810 was part of Highway 553 prior to 1976, but was downgraded to tertiary highway status in that year because of its more limited traffic usage.

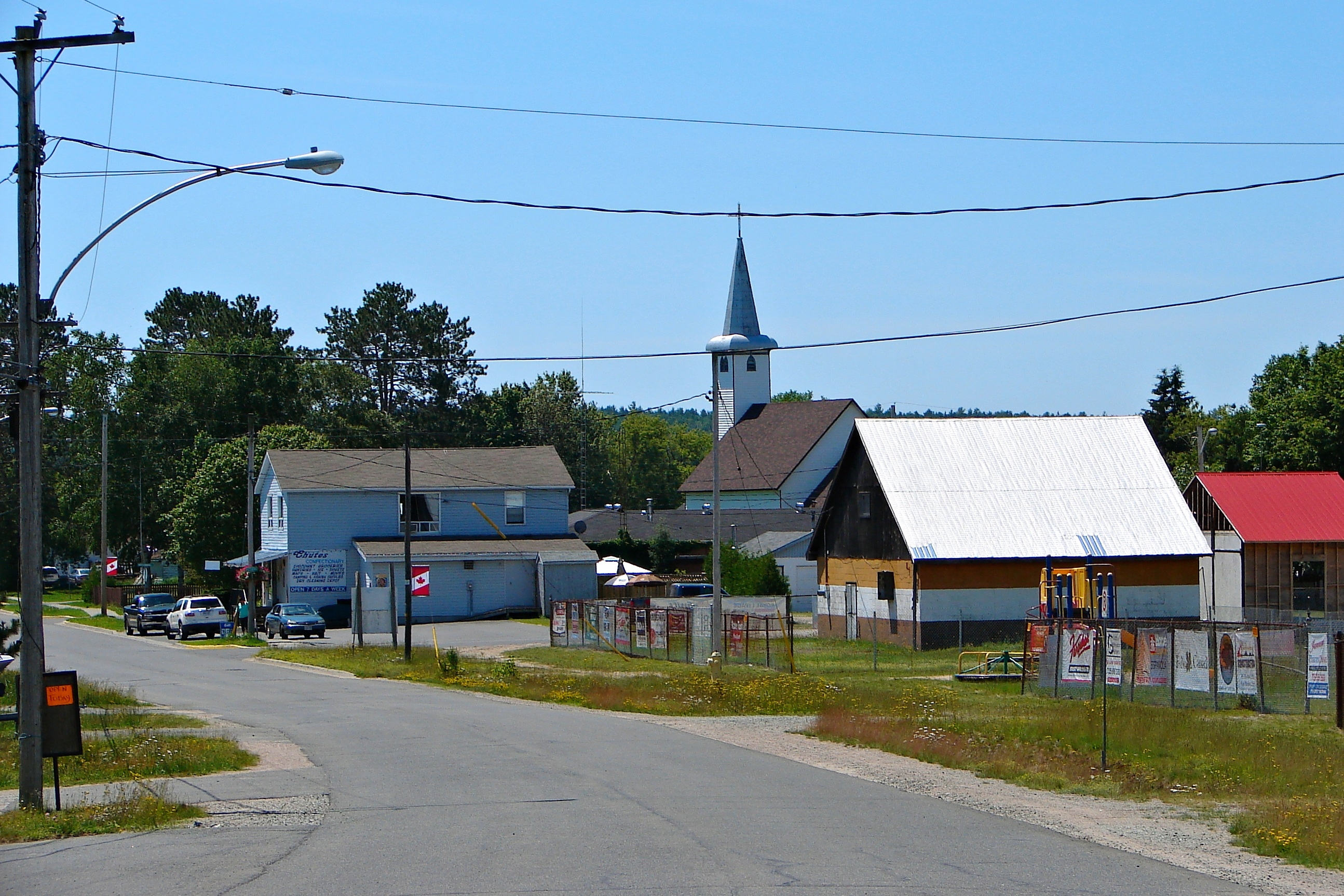
Highway 553 through Massey

== Highway 607 ==
Highway 607

Route information
- Maintained by Ministry of Transportation of Ontario
- Length: 9.5 km (5.9 mi)

Major junctions
- South end: Highway 69 near Bigwood
- North end: Highway 64 near Alban

Location
- Country: Canada
- Province: Ontario
- Municipalities: French River

Highway system
- Ontario provincial highways; Current; Former; 400-series
← Highway 605	→ Highway 607A

Secondary Highway 607, commonly referred to as Highway 607, is a provincially maintained highway in the Canadian province of Ontario, near French River Provincial Park. It links Highway 64 to Highway 69, and mainly serves as a bypass of the intersection of Highways 64 and 69. Its total length is approximately 9.5 kilometres (5.9 mi). Its northern terminus is Highway 64, and its southern terminus is at Highway 69, near Bigwood.

== Highway 607A ==
Highway 607A

Route information
- Auxiliary route of Highway 607
- Maintained by Ministry of Transportation of Ontario
- Length: 2.6 km (1.6 mi)

Major junctions
- South end: Schell's Camp at Bon Air
- North end: Highway 607

Location
- Country: Canada
- Province: Ontario
- Municipalities: French River
- Towns: Bon Air

Highway system
- Ontario provincial highways; Current; Former; 400-series
← Highway 607	→ Highway 608

Secondary Highway 607A, commonly referred to as Highway 607A, is a provincially maintained highway in the Canadian province of Ontario, in French River Provincial Park. The route connects Highway 607 to Bon Air and French River Provincial Park. Its total length is approximately 2.6 kilometres (1.6 mi). The northern terminus of the highway is Highway 607, while the southern terminus is in French River Provincial Park, 0.5 kilometres past Bon Air.

== Highway 661 ==
Highway 661

Route information
- Maintained by the Ministry of Transportation of Ontario
- Length: 4.6 km (2.9 mi)
- Existed: January 11, 1968–present

Major junctions
- North end: Highway 144 – Sudbury, Timmins
- South end: Arthur Street in Gogama

Location
- Country: Canada
- Province: Ontario
- Counties: Sudbury District

Highway system
- Ontario provincial highways; Current; Former; 400-series
← Highway 658	→ Highway 663
Former provincial highways
← Highway 659	Highway 662 →

Secondary Highway 661 commonly referred to as Highway 661, is a provincially maintained secondary highway in the Sudbury District of the Canadian province of Ontario. It is a highway spur that measures 4.6 kilometres (2.9 mi) in length and connects the town of Gogama with Highway 144. It is the only provincial highway of any class that intersects Highway 144 apart from its termini and the route of Highway 560. Highway was first assumed by the Department of Highways, predecessor to the modern Ministry of Transportation on January 11, 1968. It connected to the eastern terminus of Highway 560. That route travelled south to Westree along the alignment of what is now Highway 144, which was under construction at the time.
