= Mississagi Provincial Park =

Provincial park in Ontario, Canada

- IUCN category II (national park)
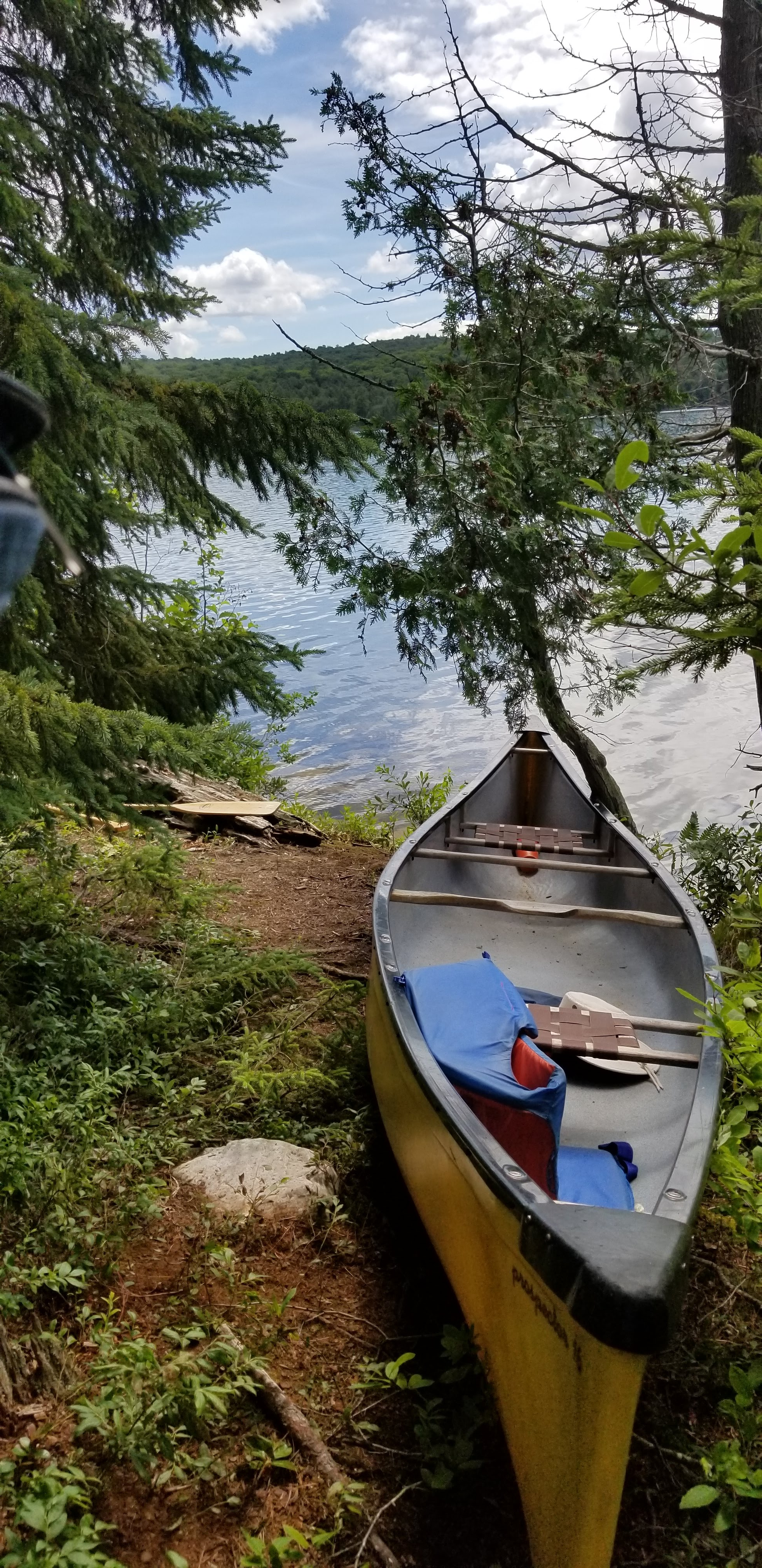
- Island in Mississagi Provincial Park

- Location within Ontario
- Interactive map of Mississagi Provincial Park
- Location: Algoma District, Ontario, Canada
- Nearest town: Elliot Lake
- Coordinates: 46°35′18″N 82°41′18″W
- Area: 8,328 ha (32.15 sq mi)
- Designation: Natural Environment
- Established: 1965 (officially regulated in 1973)
- Visitors: 17,857 (in 2022)
- Governing body: Ontario Parks
- Website: www.ontarioparks.com/park/mississagi

Mississagi Provincial Park is a natural environment-class provincial park north of Elliot Lake, in Algoma District, Ontario, Canada. It lies on the Boland River, a tributary of the Little White River, which is itself a tributary of the Mississagi River. The park is accessed via Highway 639.

The park has a rugged landscape of ancient hills and clear lakes with seven hiking trails. Together with surrounding areas, it offers more than 60 kilometres (37 mi) of trails that cross the rugged Penokean Hills.

It is an operating park requiring a permit for day and overnight use. Facilities include a total of 72 campsites (car accessible and walk-in backcountry sites), an amphitheatre, boat launches and docks (on Semiwite Lake and Flack Lake), park store, and picnic shelter. The park is used for recreational activities such as biking, boating, canoeing, fishing, hiking, swimming, and hunting.

== History ==
Mississagi Provincial Park was established in 1965 but not officially regulated under the Provincial Parks Act until 1973. At that time it comprised an area of 3,160 hectares (7,800 acres). It was expanded in 1988 with an additional 1,740 hectares (4,300 acres) to the east that included all of Helenbar Lake and significant geological features. In 2002, another 3,574 hectares (8,830 acres) were added to the north and east, consisting of two natural heritage areas: the Stag Lake Peatland and the Boland River Valley.

In late 2012, a release from the province stated that Mississagi Provincial Park would change its status from an 'operating' to a 'non-operating' park due to low visitation rates. However, due to objections from the city of Elliot Lake, a one-year pilot project was initiated in which Ontario Parks would work with the city of Elliot Lake to continue operations at Mississagi Provincial Park with the goal of increasing revenue and visitation rates. Through this agreement, the park continued to provide camping and other services during the 2013 season.

Since 2013, the park has continued to provide day-use and overnight camping for the duration of the summer seasons, and remains up and running.

== Flora and fauna ==
Forest in the park is transitional, between the boreal forest to the north and the Great Lakes–St. Lawrence forest to the south. It consists of sugar maple and yellow birch, with stands of white and red pine and some eastern hemlock. Although the original pines were logged or burned in forest fires during the early 20th century, some old-growth pines remain in and around the park. In the Boland River Valley, there are a variety of old forest communities, including white cedar and black ash swamps.

Common wildlife found in the park includes white-tailed deer, moose, black bear, red squirrel, snowshoe hare, chipmunk, raccoon, and beaver. Bird species sighted include warbler, thrush vireo, flycatcher, loon, kestrel, pileated woodpecker, osprey, and northern (Baltimore) oriole.

== Sources ==
- "Toporama - Topographic Map Sheets 41J10)". Atlas of Canada. Natural Resources Canada. Archived from the original on 2010-02-10.
