= Iron Bridge, Ontario =

Iron Bridge
- Unincorporated community
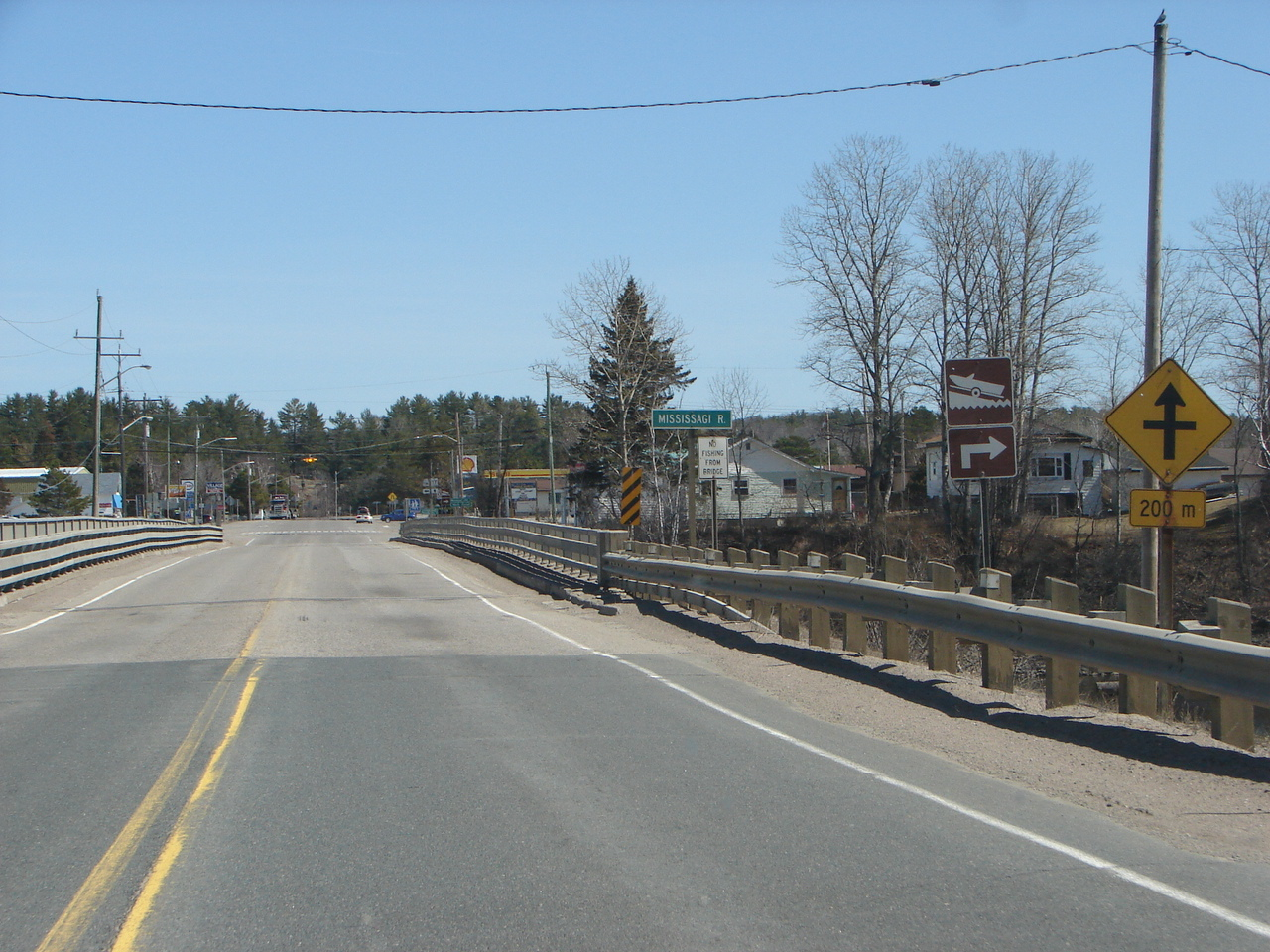

- Location within Ontario
- Coordinates: 46°16′50″N 83°13′13″W
- Country: Canada
- Province: Ontario
- District: Algoma
- Municipality: Huron Shores
- Settled: 1879
- Incorporated: January 1, 1960
- Dissolved (amalgamated): January 1, 1999

Government
  - Fed. riding: Sault Ste. Marie—Algoma
  - Prov. riding: Algoma—Manitoulin

Area
  - Land: 31.89 km^{2} (12.31 sq mi)

Population (2021)
  - Total: 592
  - Density: 18.6/km^{2} (48/sq mi)
- Time zone: UTC-5 (EST)
  - Summer (DST): UTC-4 (EDT)
- Postal code: P0R 1H0
- Area code(s): 705

Iron Bridge is an unincorporated community in Ontario, Canada. It is recognized as a designated place by Statistics Canada. The place is located along Highway 17 on the eastern banks of the Mississagi River.

== History ==
Originally the spot was a meeting place for lumberjacks, called Tally Ho, where they would tally up with their employers for the work they had done. In 1879, the Taits and Tulloch families travelled up the Mississagi River and became the first settlers there. They were soon followed by other settlers. In 1881, a wooden bridge was built over the river, which was replaced by a steel one in 1886. That same year, its post office opened, and the Postmaster decided on the new name of Iron Bridge, in reference to the then newly-built bridge.

In 1885, the first general store opened. In 1888, the Orange Hall was built which served as a school, church, and gathering place for elections. In 1892, the first church was built. In 1920, the Iron Bridge Telephone Company was formed, serving the community until 1962 when it was bought by Bell Canada.

In 1949, the first steel bridge was replaced with a new 2-lane steel and concrete bridge.

On January 1, 1960, Iron Bridge became an incorporated village, with William Beharriell as first reeve, and Austin Daigle as first Fire Chief. Later that year, the Red Rock Generating Station was built 6.4 kilometres (4 mi) upstream on the Mississagi River. In 1972, the Municipal Office/Fire Hall/Library complex was built.

On January 1, 1999, the Village of Iron Bridge was amalgamated, together with the Township of Thessalon, Township of Thompson, and Townships of Day and Bright Additional, into the new Municipality of Huron Shores.

== Demographics ==
In the 2021 Census of Population conducted by Statistics Canada, Iron Bridge had a population of 592 living in 286 of its 325 total private dwellings, a change of −5.9% from its 2016 population of 629. With a land area of 31.89 km^{2} (12.31 sq mi), it had a population density of 18.6/km^{2} (48.1/sq mi) in 2021.

Historical census populations – Iron Bridge, Ontario

Year	Pop.	±%
1961	867	—
1966	762	−12.1%
1971	874	+14.7%
1976	790	−9.6%
1981	821	+3.9%
1986	813	−1.0%
1991	823	+1.2%

Year	Pop.	±%
1996	777	−5.6%
2001	686	−11.7%
2006	614	−10.5%
2011	632	+2.9%
2016	629	−0.5%
2021	592	−5.9%

Population counts are not adjusted for boundary changes.
Source: Statistics Canada

== See also ==
- List of communities in Ontario
- List of designated places in Ontario
