= Seymour Lake (Algoma District) =

Lake in Algoma District, Ontario, Canada

- Location within Ontario
- Location: Algoma District, Ontario
- Coordinates: 46°45′08″N 83°13′41″W
- Primary inflows: Five unnamed creeks
- Primary outflows: Rapid River
- Basin countries: Canada
- Max. length: 1.7 km (1.1 mi)
- Max. width: 0.9 km (0.56 mi)
- Surface elevation: 411 m (1,348 ft)

Seymour Lake is a lake in the Lake Huron drainage basin in Algoma District, Ontario, Canada. It is about 1.7 kilometres (1.1 mi) long and 0.9 kilometres (0.6 mi) wide, and lies at an elevation of 411 metres (1,348 ft), 60 kilometres (37 mi) northwest of the community of Elliot Lake. The lake is the source of the Rapid River, which flows via the Mississagi River to Lake Huron. A road, which begins at Highway 129 north of the mouth of the Rapid River, parallels the majority of the river to Seymour Lake

== See also ==
- List of lakes in Ontario
