= Rapid River Township, Lake of the Woods County, Minnesota =

Township in Minnesota, United States

Coordinates: 48°36′11″N 94°27′58″W

Rapid River Township, Minnesota
- Township
- Location of Rapid River Township, within Lake of the Woods County, Minnesota
- Country: United States
- State: Minnesota
- County: Lake of the Woods

Area
  - Total: 36.12 sq mi (93.6 km^{2})
  - Land: 35.86 sq mi (92.9 km^{2})
  - Water: 0.26 sq mi (0.67 km^{2})

Population (2020)
  - Total: 9
  - Density: 0.25/sq mi (0.097/km^{2})
- Time zone: UTC-6 (Central (CST))
  - Summer (DST): UTC-5 (CDT)
- Area code: 218

Rapid River Township is a township in Lake of the Woods County, Minnesota, United States. The population was nine at the 2020 United States census.

== Geography ==
According to the United States Census Bureau, the township has a total area of 36.5 square miles (94.5 km^{2}), all land.

== Demographics ==
As of the census of 2000, there were 23 people, 11 households, and 6 families residing in the township. The population density was 0.6 people per square mile (0.2/km^{2}). There were 17 housing units at an average density of 0.5/sq mi (0.2/km^{2}). The racial makeup of the township was 100.00% White.

There were 11 households, out of which 18.2% had children under the age of 18 living with them, 63.6% were married couples living together, and 36.4% were non-families. 36.4% of all households were made up of individuals, and 18.2% had someone living alone who was 65 years of age or older. The average household size was 2.09 and the average family size was 2.71.

In the township the population was spread out, with 21.7% under the age of 18, 4.3% from 18 to 24, 13.0% from 25 to 44, 52.2% from 45 to 64, and 8.7% who were 65 years of age or older. The median age was 50 years. For every 100 females, there were 76.9 males. For every 100 females age 18 and over, there were 80.0 males.

The median income for a household in the township was $11,250, and the median income for a family was $11,250. Males had a median income of $0 versus $0 for females. The per capita income for the township was $5,921. None of the population or the families were below the poverty line.
