= Mississagi River Provincial Park =

Provincial park in Ontario, Canada

- IUCN category II (national park)
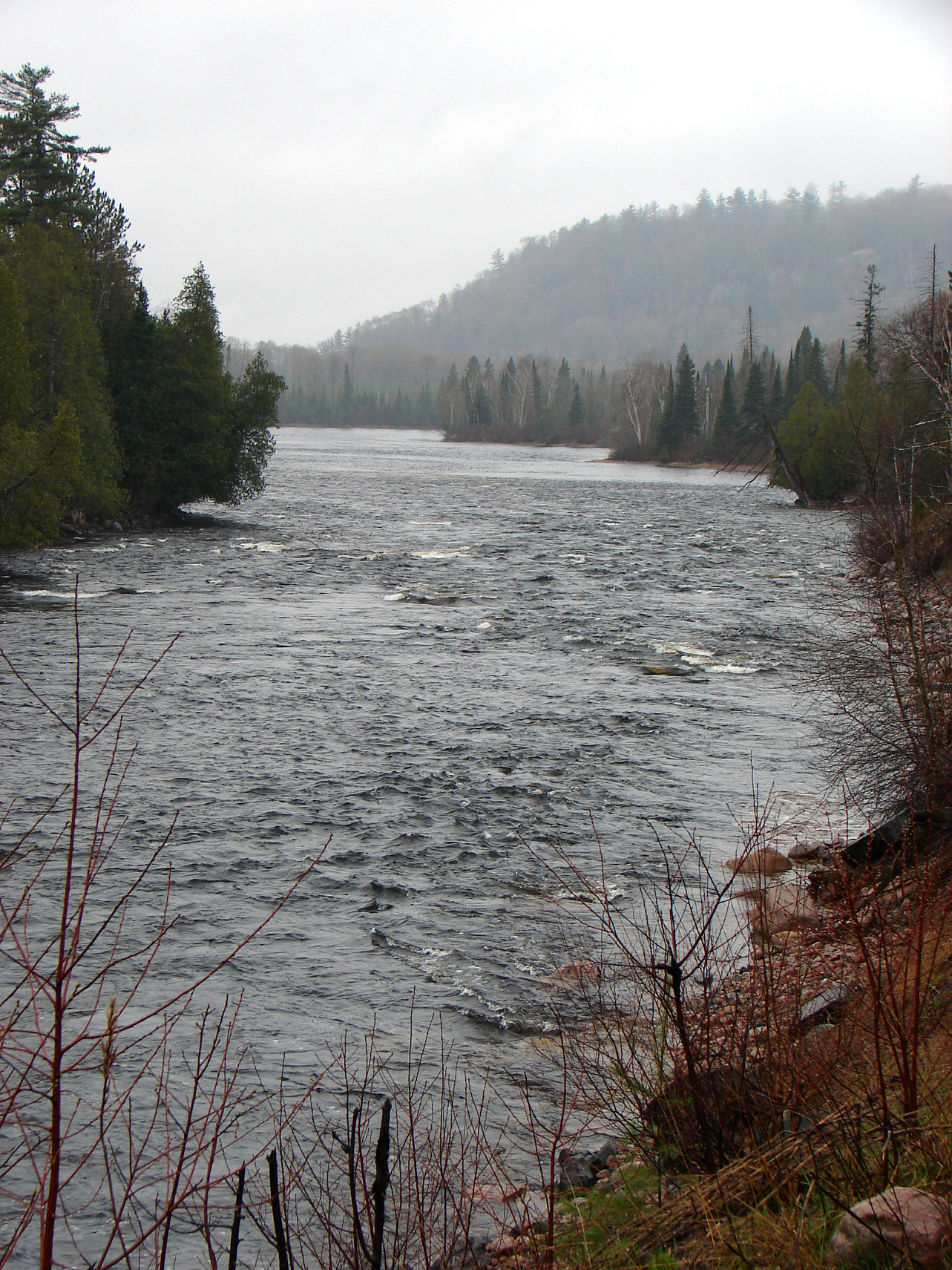

- Location within Ontario
- Location: Algoma and Sudbury Districts, Ontario, Canada
- Nearest city: Elliot Lake
- Coordinates: 47°09′02″N 82°31′26″W
- Governing body: Ontario Parks
- Website: www.ontarioparks.com/park/mississagi

Mississagi River Provincial Park is a protected area on the Mississagi River in Algoma and Sudbury Districts, Ontario, Canada. It has an Ontario Parks designation of Waterway Class. The park encompasses the river and lakes on the river from Mississagi Lake to Bark Lake, and further downstream to a point just above Ricky Island Lake, as well as portions of the upper Spanish River system.
