= Sables-Spanish Rivers =

- Township (single-tier)
- Township of Sables-Spanish Rivers
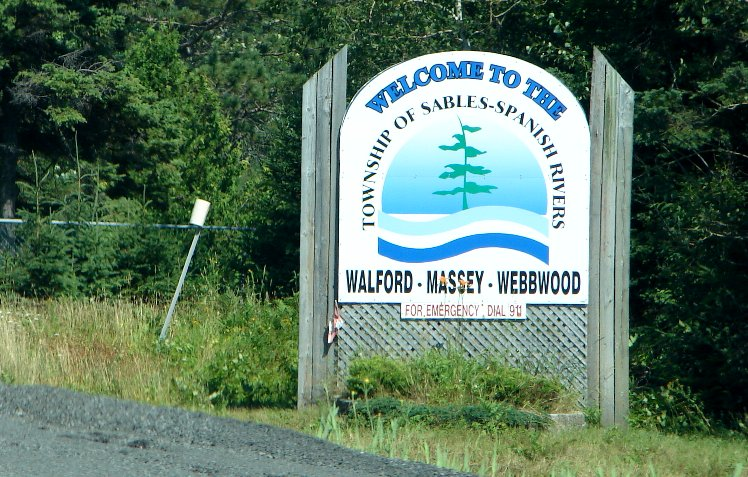
- Welcome sign along Highway 17

- Location within Ontario
- Coordinates: 46°14′N 82°00′W
- Country: Canada
- Province: Ontario
- District: Sudbury
- Established: July 1, 1998

Government
  - Type: Township
  - Mayor: Kevin Burke
  - MP: Jim Belanger (Conservative)
  - MPP: Bill Rosenberg (PC)

Area
  - Land: 801.04 km^{2} (309.28 sq mi)

Population (2021)
  - Total: 3,237
  - Density: 4/km^{2} (10/sq mi)
- Time zone: UTC-5 (EST)
  - Summer (DST): UTC-4 (EDT)
- Postal code span: P0P
- Area codes: 705, 249
- Highways: Highway 17 / TCH; Highway 553
- Website: www.sables-spanish.ca

Sables-Spanish Rivers is a township in Ontario, Canada, on the north shore of Georgian Bay. It is located in the Sudbury District, approximately 70 kilometres (43 mi) west of Sudbury.

The township was created in 1998 by amalgamating the former towns of Massey and Webbwood with the Township of The Spanish River and the unorganized geographic townships of May and Shakespeare, and was named for Massey's location at the junction of the Spanish and Aux Sables rivers.

The township's population was 3,237 in the 2021 Canadian census. The municipal offices are located in Massey.

== Communities ==
Massey (46°12′50″N 82°04′30″W) is located at the junction of the aux Sables and Spanish Rivers, close to the northern shore of Lake Huron. Chutes Provincial Park is one of its principal attractions. Massey is one of several sites that claim to be the home of broomball.

Walford (46°12′18″N 82°13′48″W) is the westernmost community of the township located along Highway 17. Its economy was primarily based on logging and mining. The old Walford fire tower still stands north of the village on Tube Lake.

Webbwood (46°16′12″N 81°53′24″W) was incorporated as a town in 1906.

The hamlet of Lee Valley is divided between the municipalities of Sables-Spanish Rivers and Espanola.

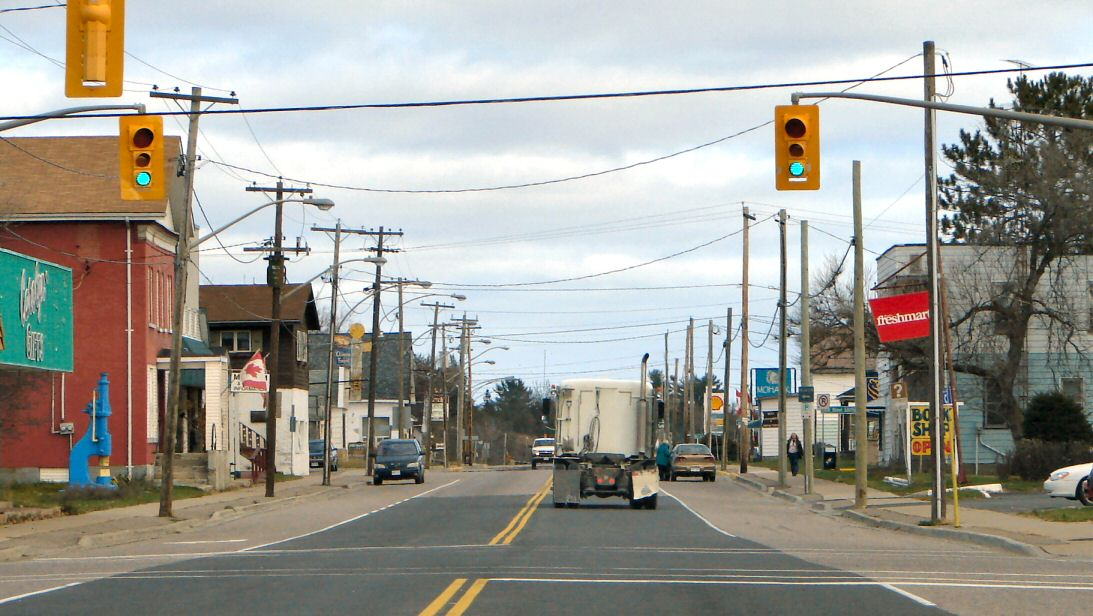
Massey

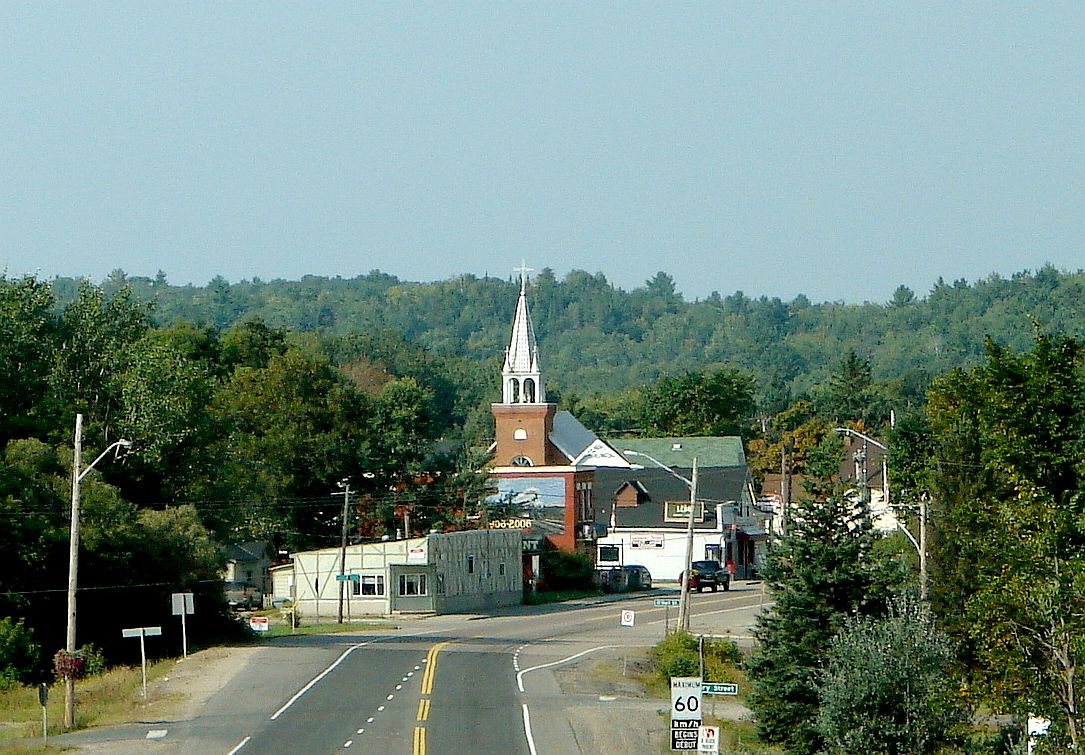
Webbwood

== Demographics ==
In the 2021 Census of Population conducted by Statistics Canada, Sables-Spanish Rivers had a population of 3,237 living in 1,386 of its 1,718 total private dwellings, a change of 1.5% from its 2016 population of 3,188. With a land area of 801.04 km^{2} (309.28 sq mi), it had a population density of 4.0/km^{2} (10.5/sq mi) in 2021.

Canada census – Sables-Spanish Rivers community profile

	2021	2016	2011
Population	3,237 (+1.5% from 2016)	3,188 (+3.7% from 2011)	3,075 (-5.0% from 2006)
Land area	801.04 km^{2} (309.28 sq mi)	815.21 km^{2} (314.75 sq mi)	815.80 km^{2} (314.98 sq mi)
Population density	4.0/km^{2} (10/sq mi)	3.9/km^{2} (10/sq mi)	3.8/km^{2} (9.8/sq mi)
Median age	50.4 (M: 50.4, F: 50.8)	47.8 (M: 47.0, F: 48.9)
Private dwellings	1,718 (total) 1,386 (occupied)	1,666 (total) 1,312 (occupied)	1,625 (total)
Median household income	$70,500	$62,933

Notes: 2016 Data based on population and dwelling count amendment.
References: 2021 2016 2011

Sables-Spanish Rivers Historical populations

Year	Pop.	±%
1996	3,332	—
2001	3,245	−2.6%
2006	3,237	−0.2%

Year	Pop.	±%
2011	3,075	−5.0%
2016	3,188	+3.7%
2021	3,237	+1.5%

2016 Population figure based on revised count.
Source: Statistics Canada

== Culture ==
The community hosts an annual fair in late August, which celebrated its 100th anniversary in 2007.

Massey holds a fall fair every year at the fairgrounds. There are rides, contests, prizes, many games and even more vendors. A crash-up car derby has been recently been added along with a four-wheeler mud bog competition. In 2008, the classic car show at the fair was very small compared to the years before so it may be cancelled. There are motocross races, horse pulls, and horse shows there as well.

=== Recreation and sports ===
The Massey District Community Centre and Arena is located in Massey, and plays host to the Massey Predators Minor Hockey Association and the Massey and District Figure Skating Club. The Massey Marathon is held annually using the arena as a centre for registration and award ceremony. The marathon is now in its 33rd year and is a qualifier for the Boston Marathon. The township is also the home of Chutes Provincial Park.

== Transportation ==
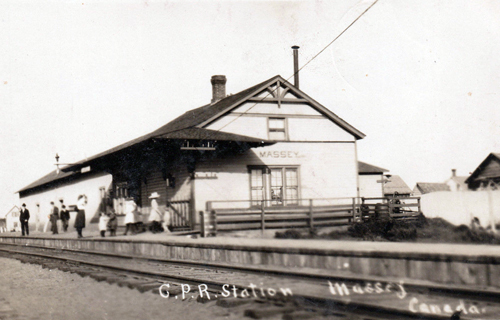
Canadian Pacific Railway station in Massey, c. 1910.

All three of the township's main communities are located directly along Highway 17. Massey is located at the junction of Highway 17 and Highway 553.

All three communities sit along the Huron Central Railway, and once had Canadian Pacific Railway stations. Webbwood was once a divisional point on the Canadian Pacific Railway's Sudbury–Soo Line, with the Webbwood Subdivision to the east and the Thessalon Subdivision to the west. As steam engines were phased out, Canadian Pacific no longer needed as many divisional points for refueling and repair, so its importance as a station declined and the station was eventually removed.

Massey and Webbwood are both stops on Ontario Northland's Sault Ste. Marie–Ottawa motor coach route.

The Great Lakes Waterfront Trail, a part of the Trans Canada Trail, passes through the township. Travelling from Spanish in the west, the trail enters the township following DeClerk Road and Menard Crescent on gravel before following the route of Highway 17 along a paved shoulder. At Walford, it dips south to follow the gravel route of River Road parallel and to the north of the Spanish River. Upon reaching Massey, it passes through the south of the town before continuing along Lee Valley Road toward Lee Valley.

== Media ==
The township is served primarily by media from Sudbury, Elliot Lake, Espanola and Little Current.

In 1995, The Canadian Wildlife Experience Inc. received a licence to operate a new low-power tourist information radio station to serve Massey, Walford and Spanish, Ontario at 98.5 MHz, during the spring, summer and fall seasons. The call letters were CJWE-FM. It is uncertain if the station is still currently in operation.

== Notable people ==
The citizens of Webbwood elected Canada's first female mayor, Barbara Hanley, in 1936.

Massey is the birthplace of artist Robert Lougheed and former NHLer Pete Horeck. It is also the hometown of writer and former bank robber Stephen Reid and the current home of poet Charlie Smith.

Theodore Drake, one of the inventors of Pablum, was born at Webbwood.

== See also ==
- List of townships in Ontario
- List of francophone communities in Ontario
