= Mississagi River =

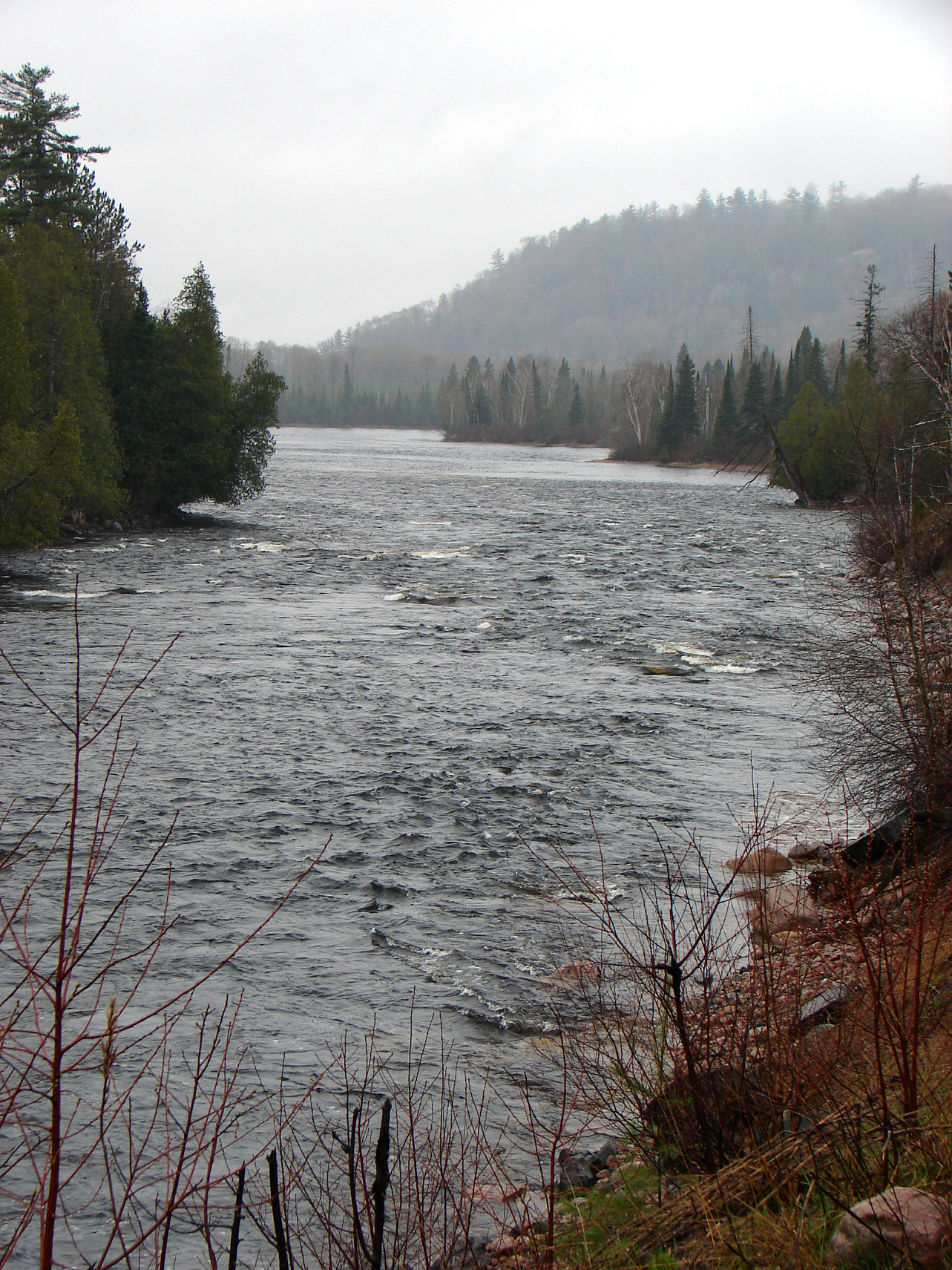

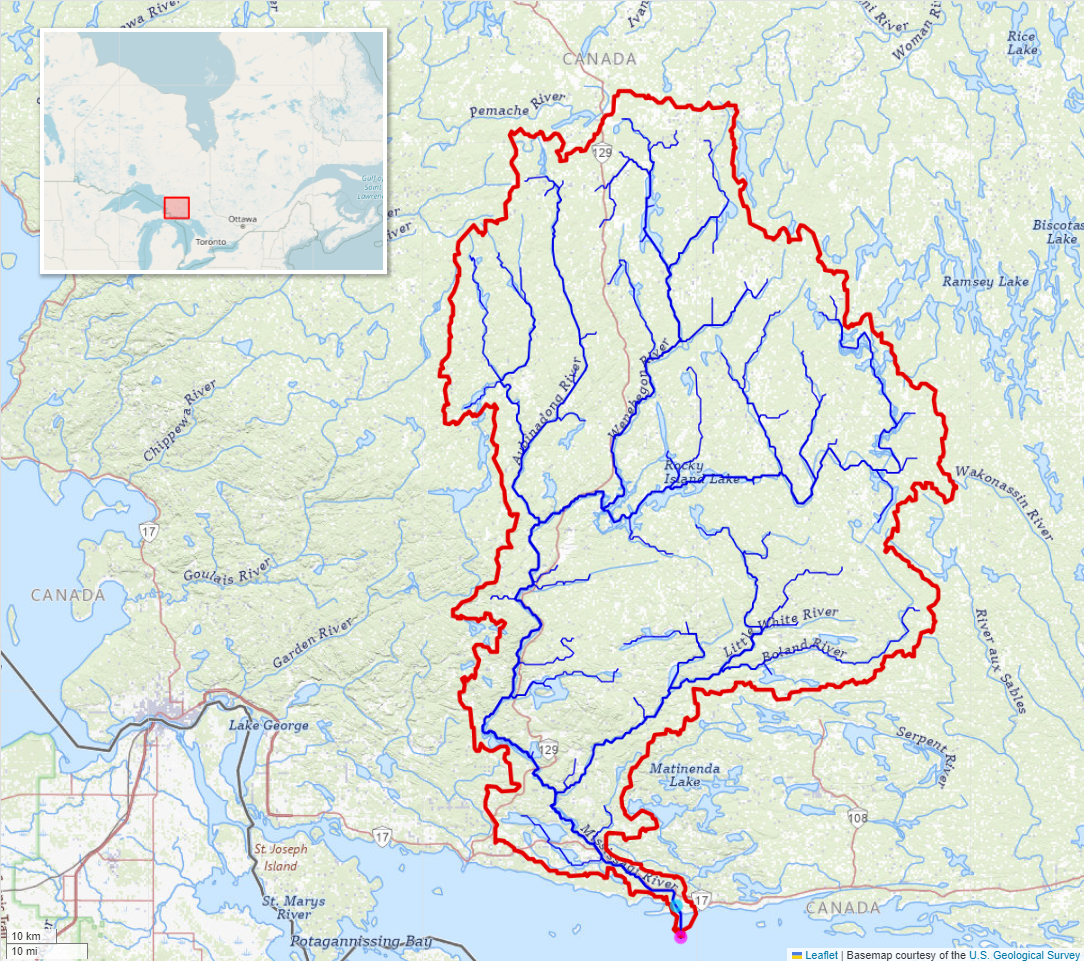
- Mississagi River basin map

- Location of the mouth of the Mississagi River in Ontario
- Etymology: misi-zaagi, "river with a wide mouth" in Ojibwe

Location
- Country: Canada
- Province: Ontario
- Districts: Algoma; Sudbury

Physical characteristics
- Source: Unnamed lake
  - location: Unorganized, North Part, Sudbury District
  - coordinates: 47°17′57″N 82°39′34″W
  - elevation: 520 m (1,710 ft)
- Mouth: Lake Huron
  - location: Blind River, Algoma District
  - coordinates: 46°10′29″N 83°0′58″W
  - elevation: 176 m (577 ft)
- Length: 266 km (165 mi)
- Basin size: 9,270 km^{2} (3,580 sq mi)
- Discharge
  - average: 118 m^{3}/s (4,200 cu ft/s)
  - minimum: 38.3 m^{3}/s (1,350 cu ft/s)
  - maximum: 225 m^{3}/s (7,900 cu ft/s)

Basin features
- River system: Great Lakes Basin
- Tributaries
  - left: Sharpsand, Rapid, Little White
  - right: Abinette, Cypress, Wenebegon, Aubinadong, Bolton

The Mississagi River is a river in Algoma and Sudbury Districts, Ontario, Canada, that originates in Sudbury District and flows 266 kilometres (165 mi) to Lake Huron at Blind River, Algoma District.

== Etymology ==
The river's name comes from the Ojibwe misi-zaagi, meaning "river with a wide mouth".

== Geography ==
The Mississagi River begins in a small unnamed lake in Sudbury District and flows south 8 kilometres (5 mi) from that point to the border of Algoma District, then southeast through a north-east corner of the district, before returning once again to Sudbury District at White Owl Lake, from which it flows into Mississagi Lake at an elevation of 457 metres (1,499 ft).

The river then turns south and heads to Kettle Lake, the furthest point east it reaches, before continuing south and entering Mississagi River Provincial Park at Upper Bark Lake at an elevation of 446 metres (1,463 ft). The river then continues south and crosses back into Algoma District, where it remains for the rest of its journey to Lake Huron, and enters the large L-shaped Bark Lake. It then heads west through Hellgate Rapids, takes in its right tributary the Abinette River at an elevation of 411 metres (1,348 ft), splits into two channels to form an island at 46°56′22″N 82°48′05″W, recombines at 46°55′55″N 82°48′52″W, and enters the large Rocky Island Lake at an elevation of 410 metres (1,345 ft), where the right tributary Cypress River enters. The Mississagi River then flows into Aubrey Lake, partially formed by the Aubrey Falls Generating Station (hydro) and dam, and where the Wenebegon Rivers joins. Not all the water is funnelled into the station, however; some continues to form the Aubrey Falls.

The river turns south and the right tributary Aubinadong River enters, followed by two left tributaries, the Sharpsand River and the Rapid River in quick succession, and further on, another left tributary, Snowshoe Creek from Wakomata Lake. Then it reaches Tunnel Lake, formed by the George W Rayner Generating Station and Wells Generating Station and associated dams. The river then heads southeast where the left tributary Little White River enters, and continues to Red Rock Lake, created by the Red Rock Falls Generating Station and dam, over the Shino Rapids, takes in the right tributary Bolton River, then reaches the North Channel on Lake Huron.

Over the period 1961 to 2023, the Mississagi River has a mean flow of 118 cubic metres per second (4,200 cu ft/s). Mean minimal flow is 38.3 cubic metres per second (1,350 cu ft/s) and mean maximum flow is 255 cubic metres per second (9,000 cu ft/s). Record maximum flow was 415 cubic metres per second (14,700 cu ft/s) in May 1997, while record minimum flow was 25.5 cubic metres per second (900 cu ft/s) in December 1976.

The river's delta is a "bird's foot" delta, a type not commonly found on the Great Lakes. The Mississippi River in Louisiana has a bird's foot delta.

Communities along the Mississagi River in upstream order:

- Mississauga First Nation
- Blind River
- Iron Bridge
- Wharncliffe, Ontario

=== Tributaries ===
- Abinette River (right)
- Cypress River (right)
- Wenebegon River (right)
- Aubinadong River (right)
- Sharpsand River (left)
- Rapid River (left)
- Grindstone Creek (left)
- Little White River (left)
- Bolton River (right)

== History ==
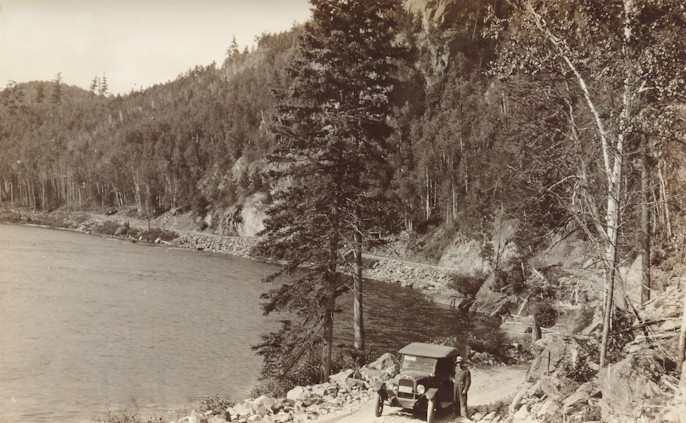
Highway 129 along the Mississagi River, 1926

The Ojibwa people used the river to travel between the forests of the interior and Lake Huron. In 1799, the North West Company built a fur trading post at the mouth of the river, which became a Hudson's Bay Company post in 1821 when these 2 companies merged. In the 1830s, the post was only staffed in the winter. The post (spelled over time as Mississagi, Mississague, Mississagaue, Missasague, Mississagui, Mississaguie, Mississaugie, Mitsisague, Missisaguee, Missisauge, Mississauga, and Mississauguay) was important in blocking competition from trading in the Temiskamingue area. The post was closed in 1900.

During the second half of the 19th century, the river was used to transport logs to sawmills at Blind River.

== Economy ==
Ontario Hydro constructed dams and four hydroelectric generating stations on the Mississagi River, Rayner G.S., Wells G.S., Red Rock Falls G.S., and Aubrey Falls G.S. between 1950 and 1970, which today are operated by Brookfield Asset Management. Historically, mining and forestry played a large role, but today tourism is the primary activity along the river.

Highway 129 follows the river from Wharncliffe until the river turns east at Aubrey Falls.

== Ecology ==
The lower river is an important spawning ground for lake sturgeon.

Aubrey Falls Provincial Park is on the river at Aubrey Falls. Mississagi River Provincial Park encompasses the upper reaches of the river including Mississagi Lake. Mississagi Provincial Park is on the Boland River, a tributary of the Little White River. Mississagi Delta Provincial Nature Reserve Park encompasses the river's delta mouth. The Voyageur Hiking Trail follows the lower portion of the river near Iron Bridge.

== See also ==
- List of rivers of Ontario
