= Goulais =

Goulais can refer to:

Places, all in Ontario, Canada:

- Goulais Bay
- Goulais River
- Goulais Bay 15A, a First Nations reserve in Algoma District
- Goulais Bay 15C, a former First Nation reserve within Prince Township
- Goulais and District, a local services board

People:

- Yves Goulais, French screenwriter and theatre director
