= Rankin Location 15D =

- Indian reserve
- Rankin Location Indian Reserve No. 15D
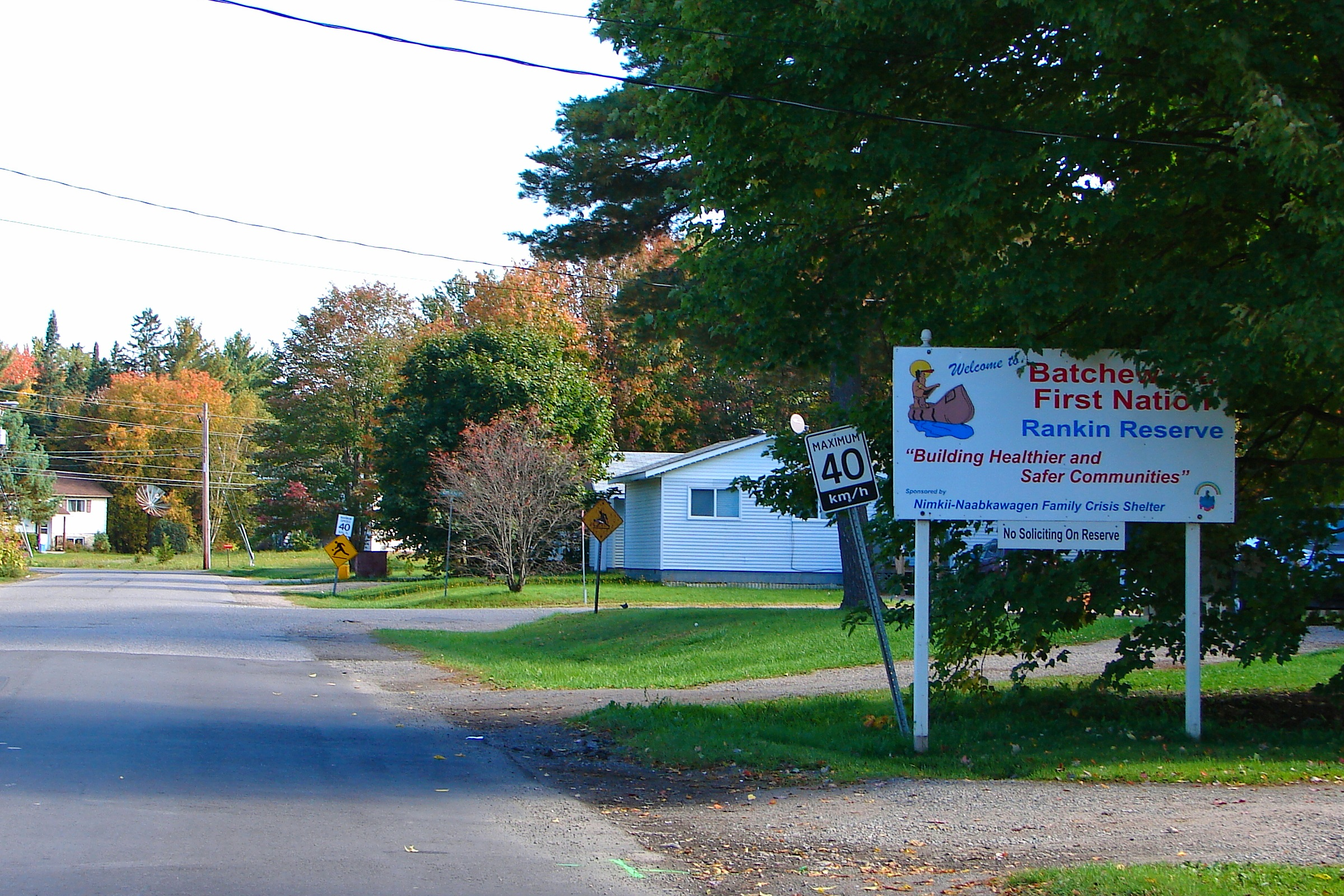

- Location within Ontario
- Coordinates: 46°34′N 84°15′W
- Country: Canada
- Province: Ontario
- District: Algoma
- First Nation: Batchewana

Area
  - Land: 15.66 km^{2} (6.05 sq mi)

Population (2006)
  - Total: 566
  - Density: 36.1/km^{2} (93/sq mi)
- Time zone: UTC-5 (EST)
  - Summer (DST): UTC-4 (EDT)
- Website: www.batchewana.ca

Rankin Location 15D is one of four reserves of the Batchewana First Nation in Algoma District in northeastern Ontario, Canada. It is bounded on the north, west and south by the city of Sault Ste. Marie, and on the east by Garden River First Nations reserve of another Ojibwe people. As of 2005, a total of 2,205 people were registered to the Nation; about half live on the reserves and many others live in Sault Ste. Marie.

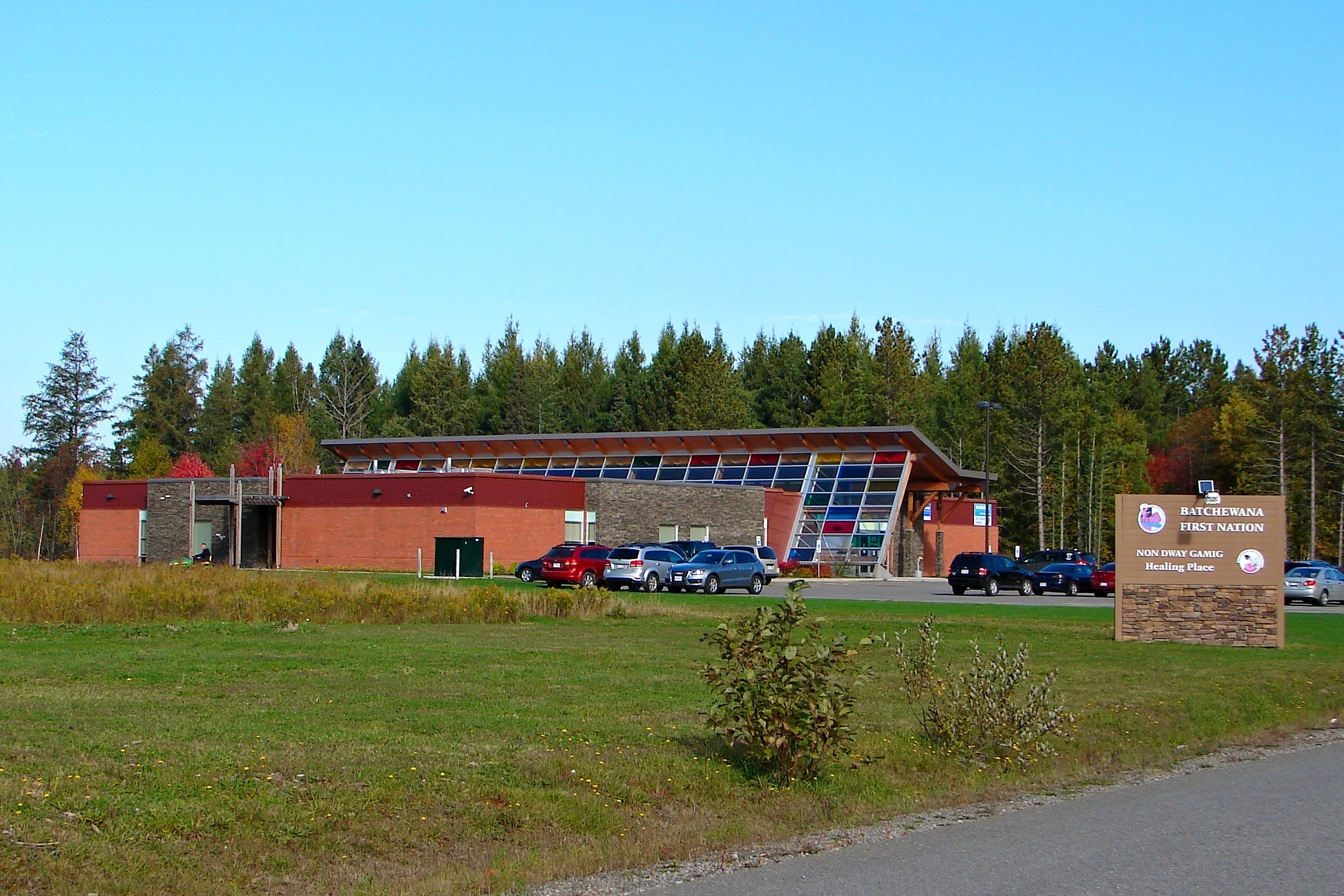
Non Dway Gamig Healing Place

At 3,733 acres, Rankin is the largest of four reserves for the Batchewana band First Nation, whose traditional territory ran north from Sault Ste. Marie (known in Anishinaabe as Bahatwing), along the Lake Superior coastline. Their total amount of land in reserves is 2,241 hectares (5538 acres). The other reserves include Whitefish Island in the St. Marys River, Obadjiwan 15E at Batchawana Bay, and at Goulais Bay 15A. None of these areas are reserves under the 1850 Robinson Treaty by which they ceded their land to the Crown. The band signed the Pennefather Treaty in 1859 relinquishing all title to Reserve 15 (except for Whitefish Island, which was expropriated by the Crown in 1902).

The Nation purchased the Rankin property in 1939, trying to regain some of its historic territory. It was added into the reserve system in 1952 by government approval. The Nation has also maintained historic hunting and fishing rights under the Treaty. This was affirmed in the Gargantua Harbour Trial, with a ruling in 2015 in favor of the Batchawana Band First Nation being allowed to continue commercial fishing and have access to a traditional village through Lake Superior Provincial Park.
