= Aubinadong-Nushatogaini Rivers Provincial Park =

Provincial park in Ontario, Canada

- IUCN category II (national park)
- Location within Ontario
- Location: Algoma District, Ontario, Canada
- Coordinates: 47°05′33″N 83°30′12″W
- Area: 4,928 ha (19.03 sq mi)
- Designation: Waterway
- Established: 2003
- Governing body: Ontario Parks
- Website: www.ontarioparks.com/park/aubinadongnushatogainirivers

The Aubinadong-Nushatogaini Rivers Provincial Park is a provincial park in Algoma District, Ontario, Canada. It protects a 85 kilometres (53 mi) network of rivers and lakes, in particular portions of the West Aubinadong and Nushatogaini Rivers, as well as a series of lakes extending south from the West Aubinadong-Nushatogaini confluence towards Ranger Lake, such as Saymo, Gong, Island, Mystery, and Friendly Lakes. As a waterway park, it includes a 200 metres (660 ft) strip of land along both banks of the rivers and along the shores of the lakes.

The Nushatogaini is a tributary of the West Aubinadong, which in turn drains in the Aubinadong River. These rivers are sandy bottom streams with some rocky whitewater sections. They form part of a major canoe camping route known as the Ranger North Canoe Loop. This 110 km (68 mi), teardrop-shaped loop starts at Ranger Lake, then north through Saymo, Island, and Gong Lakes, followed by going upstream of the West Aubinadong River to Megisan Lake in Algoma Headwaters Provincial Park. This lake is the height-of-land, and with portaging to Prairie Grass Lake, the Nushatogaini River can be taken back.

Aubinadong-Nushatogaini Rivers Provincial Park is a non-operating park. There are no services or facilities. Permitted activities include canoeing, fishing, and hunting.

The park is part of the Algoma Headwaters Signature Site, an area noted for diversity of natural and recreational values. This signature site also includes the Algoma Headwaters Provincial Park (which is connected to the Aubinadong-Nushatogaini Rivers Provincial Park to the north), as well as the Goulais River Provincial Park and the Ranger North Conservation Reservet.
