= Algoma Headwaters Provincial Park =

Provincial park in Ontario, Canada

- IUCN category II (national park)
- Location within Ontario
- Location: Algoma District and Sudbury District, Ontario, Canada
- Coordinates: 47°08′12″N 83°36′38″W
- Area: 42,736 ha (165.00 sq mi)
- Designation: Natural Environment
- Established: 2003
- Governing body: Ontario Parks
- Website: www.ontarioparks.com/park/algomaheadwaters

The Algoma Headwaters Provincial Park is a large provincial park in Algoma and Sudbury Districts, Ontario, Canada. It is undeveloped remote wilderness located about 90 kilometres (56 mi) northeast of Sault Ste. Marie, with little road access.

== Description ==
Situated on the Precambrian rock of the Canadian Shield, Algoma Headwaters Provincial Park is characterized by a mix of low hills, forests, wetlands, and interconnected waterways. As its name indicates, this park protects the headwaters of several rivers, such as the Aubinadong, Batchawana, Chippewa, Garden, Goulais, Montreal, Mississagi, and Nushatogaini Rivers.

8,600 hectares (21,000 acres) in the northeast corner of the park is designated as a Wilderness Zone. This section is the most remote and pristine, without road access, and no permission for any motorized travel (e.g. motorboats, ATV's, snowmobiles, etc.). It includes patches of old-growth white pine west of Gord Lake, that are "among the oldest and best representative samples of old-growth white pine in the Algoma region".

In addition to this Wilderness Zone and several Natural Environment Zones, Algoma Headwaters Provincial Park also has two Historic Zones on Megisan Lake that protect traditional Aboriginal sites which once served as a centre of canoe and winter routes, as well as a location for canoe building.

Algoma Headwaters Provincial Park is a non-operating park. There are no services or facilities. Permitted activities include boating, canoeing, fishing, and hunting.

== Algoma Headwaters Signature Site ==
The park is connected to the Goulais River Provincial Park to the south, the Aubinadong-Nushatogaini Rivers Provincial Park to the southeast, and the Ranger North Conservation Reserve to the west. These four protected areas together constitute the Algoma Headwaters Signature Site.

The 7,020 hectares (17,300 acres) Ranger North Conservation Reserve, regulated as a reserve since 1997, has a large stand of old-growth white and red pine trees around Quinn Lake, Bliss Lake, and Galloway Lake. This is estimated to be one of the oldest pine forests in Ontario, with some pines over 350 years old.
