= Goulais Bay 15C =

- Former Indian reserve
- Goulais Bay Indian Reserve No. 15C
- Location within Ontario
- Coordinates: 46°31′N 84°35′W
- Country: Canada
- Province: Ontario
- District: Algoma
- First Nation: Batchewana

Area
  - Land: 0.02 km^{2} (0.0077 sq mi)

Goulais Bay 15C was a First Nation reserve within Prince Township, Ontario. This 5-acre tract of land was given to the Batchewana First Nation after Whitefish Island was expropriated from them in 1902. The land was sold by the band in 1956 for $3,600, and it ceased to be a reserve.
