= Aubinadong River =

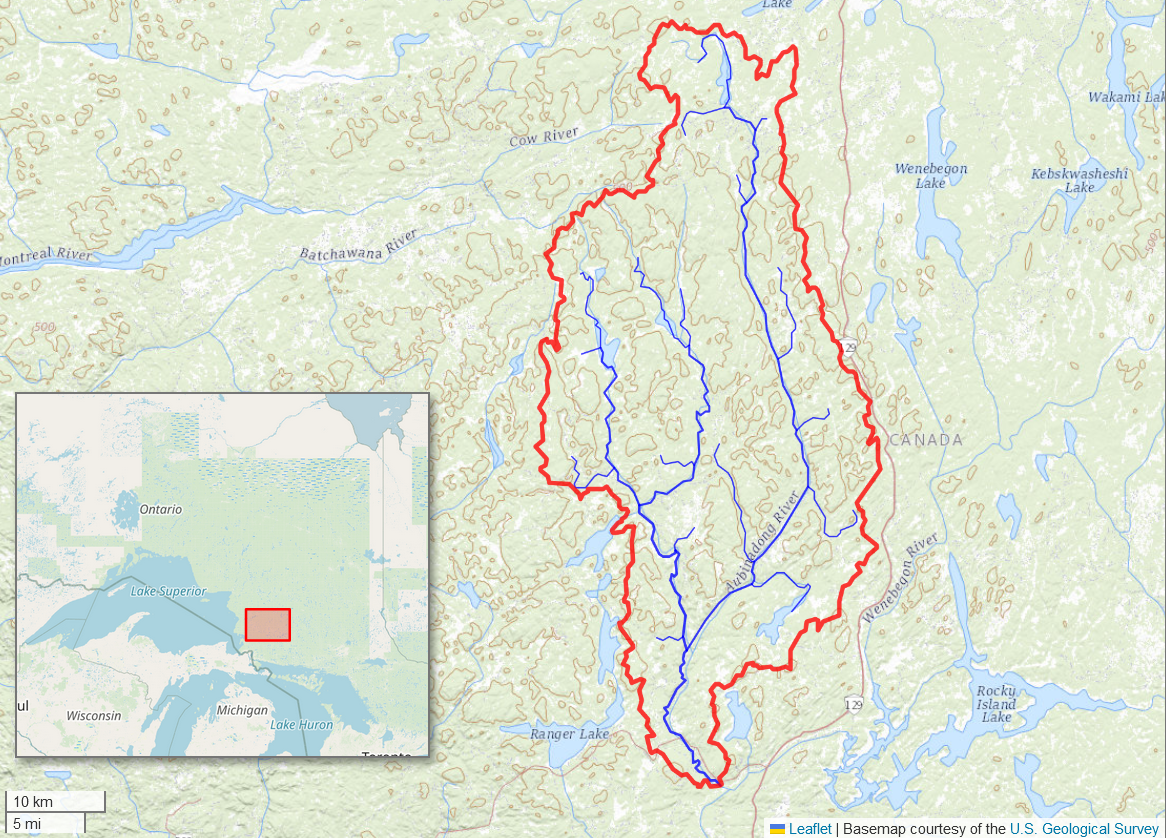
- Map of the Aubinadong River watershed

- Location within Ontario Location within Canada

Location
- Country: Canada
- Province: Ontario
- Districts: Sudbury, Algoma

Physical characteristics
- Source
  - location: Whitehead Township
- Mouth: Mississagi River
  - coordinates: 46°51′25″N 83°21′51″W
- Length: 100 km (62 mi)
- Discharge
  - location: Above Sesabic Creek
  - average: 17.6 m^{3}/s (620 cu ft/s)
  - minimum: 3.91 m^{3}/s (138 cu ft/s)
  - maximum: 49.8 m^{3}/s (1,760 cu ft/s)

Basin features
- Tributaries
  - right: Little Aubinadong River, West Aubinadong River

The Aubinadong River is a river in Sudbury and Algoma Districts, Ontario, Canada. It is a right tributary of the Mississagi River.

== Description ==
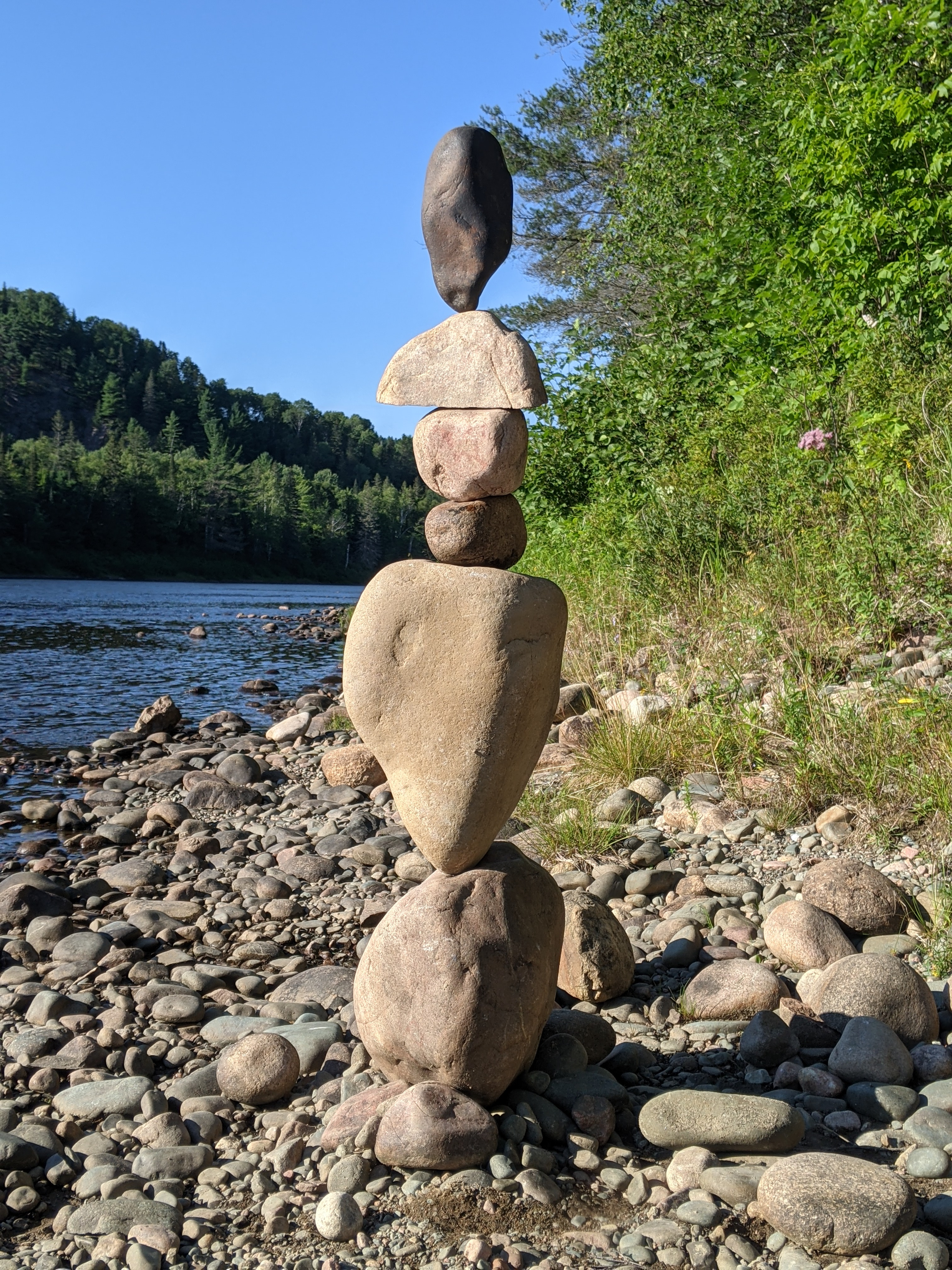
Inuksuk on the bank of the river

The river springs in Whitehead Township, a geographic township in the northwestern part of Sudbury District. It flows in a mostly southerly direction through a variety of landscapes with high, rugged rock cliffs in the north, and flatter, lower lying areas in the south. It has generally wide, deep, slow-moving stretches interspersed by narrow channels of whitewater. Its dark water has a considerable amount of humic acid.

The river forms part of a traditional indigenous canoe route, linking the interior with Lake Huron via the Mississagi River. It is still used for canoe camping as the main recreational activity. Starting at Five Mile Lake Provincial Park, the canoe route is about 98 kilometres (61 mi) long, requiring 5 days.

About half the length of the Aubinadong River, from the Sudbury-Algoma District boundary to its mouth, is protected within the Aubinadong River Provincial Park, while a portion of the West Aubinadong River is protected in the Aubinadong-Nushatogaini Rivers Provincial Park. The river's water sources are protected within the Algoma Headwaters Provincial Park.

Over the period 1980 to 2022, the Aubinadong River has an average mean flow of 17.6 cubic metres per second (620 cu ft/s). Mean minimal flow is 3.91 cubic metres per second (138 cu ft/s) and mean maximum flow is 49.8 cubic metres per second (1,760 cu ft/s). Record maximum flow was 119 cubic metres per second (4,200 cu ft/s) in May 1996, while record minimum flow was 1.43 cubic metres per second (50 cu ft/s) in August 2012.

Among the fish species present in the river are brook trout, pike, and walleye.

== Aubinadong River Provincial Park ==
Aubinadong River Provincial Park
- IUCN category II (national park)
- Location: Algoma District, Ontario, Canada
- Coordinates: 47°03′27″N 83°19′26″W
- Length: 50 km (31 mi)
- Area: 2,722 ha (10.51 sq mi)
- Designation: Waterway
- Established: 2002
- Governing body: Ontario Parks
- Website: www.ontarioparks.com/park/aubinadongriver

The Aubinadong River Provincial Park protects a 50-kilometre (31 mi) long section, or about half the length of the entire Aubinadong River. As a waterway park, it includes the river and a 200-metre (660 ft) strip of land along both banks. It borders on the Mississagi River Provincial Park to the south.

Notable features of the park are its wild nature that provide habitats to a wide variety of amphibian, reptile, and bird species (including hawks, kingfishers, ravens, swallows, and possibly peregrine falcons). The river's riparian habitats are regionally significant. There are also some stands of old-growth white pine (Pinus strobus) along the river.

Aubinadong River Provincial Park is a non-operating park. There are no services or facilities. Permitted activities include canoeing, fishing, and hunting.
