= Goulais River =

River in Ontario, Canada

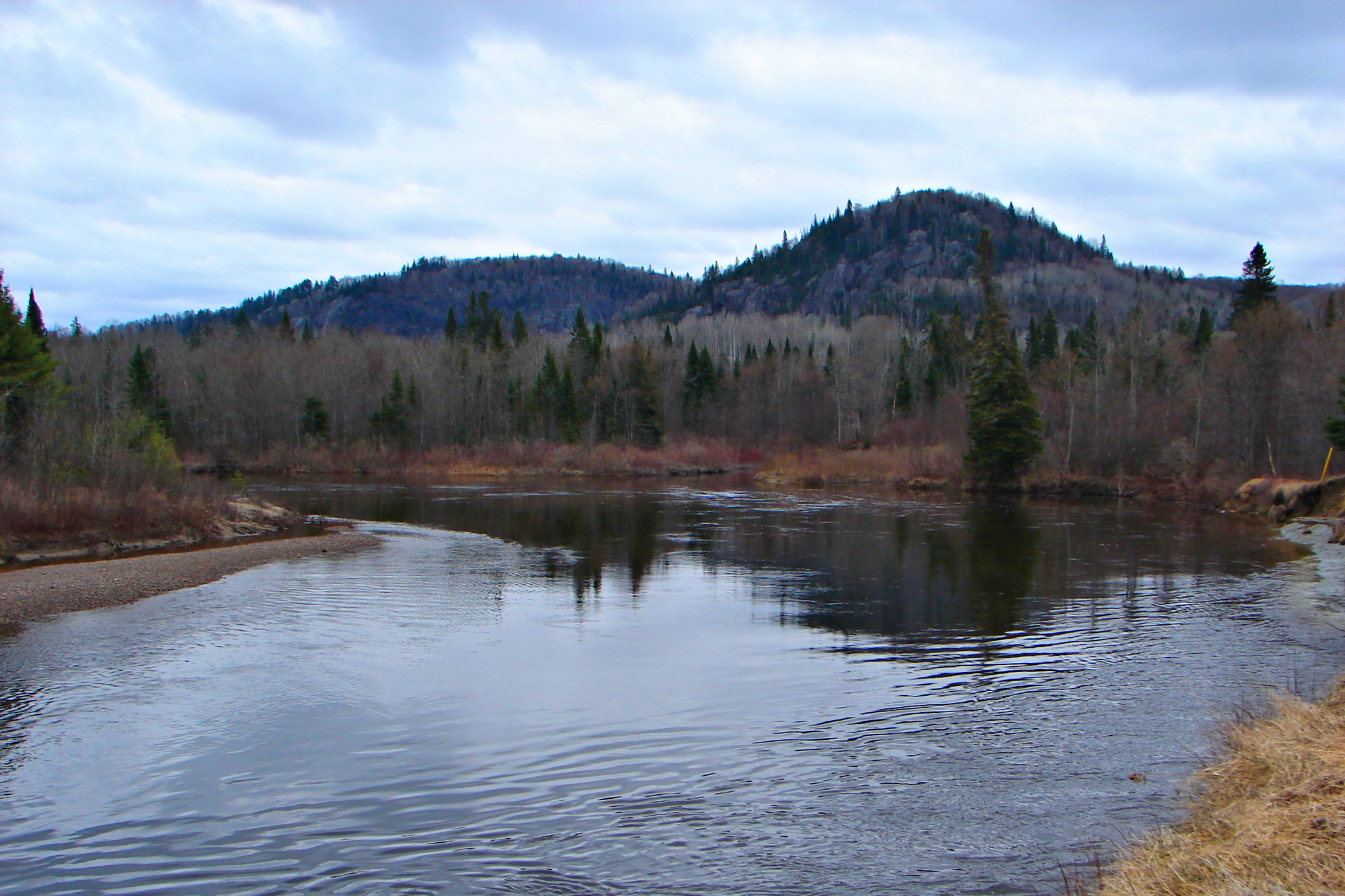

- Location within Ontario

Location
- Country: Canada
- Province: Ontario
- District: Algoma

Physical characteristics
- Mouth: Goulais Bay
  - location: Goulais and District
  - coordinates: 46°42′41″N 84°26′49″W
  - elevation: 183 m (600 ft)
- Length: 70 km (43 mi)
- Discharge
  - location: Kirby's Corner
  - average: 31.9 m^{3}/s (1,130 cu ft/s)

The Goulais River (Pronounced: goo-lee) is a river in northern Ontario, Canada, which rises in the Algoma highlands and empties into Goulais Bay on eastern Lake Superior near Sault Ste. Marie, Ontario. It is one of the largest tributaries on the eastern lake, draining an area of approximately 2,000 square kilometres (770 sq mi).

The river and its tributaries were used to transport logs to local sawmills during the second half of the 19th century. The Algoma Central Railway travels up the river valley on its way to the Agawa canyon.

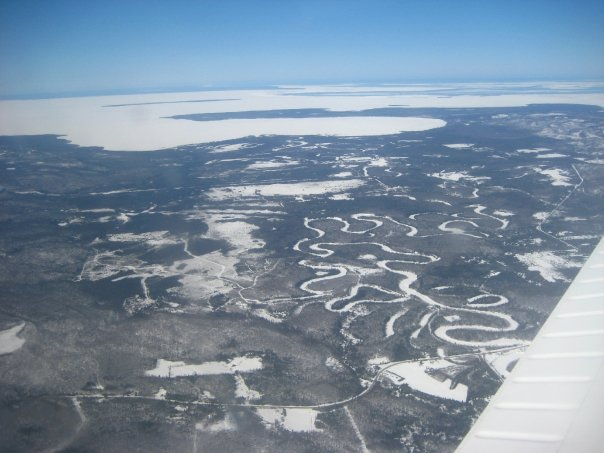
Goulais River from the air, with Goulais Bay (Lake Superior) in the background

At one time, the river was an important spawning area for lake sturgeon. However, logging operations, fishing and the installation of an electric barrier to prevent sea lampreys from travelling upstream (removed in 1960) have reduced sturgeon activity in the river.

The river is used for recreational canoeing, kayaking, and swimming, and the headwaters and parts of the river have been protected by the Goulais River Provincial Park.

The river's name is thought to come from the French word goulet or "narrow passage", which is also the source of the English words "gully" and "gullet". The French called the area at the river's mouth Anse de la pêche or "Fish Inlet".

The Goulais River is a popular yellow pickerel fishing area. The river is also home to bass, brook trout, and other species.

== Goulais River Provincial Park ==
Goulais River Provincial Park
- IUCN category II (national park)
- Location: Ontario, Canada
- Coordinates: 46°59′50″N 83°54′46″W
- Area: 50.86 km^{2} (19.64 sq mi)
- Established: 2003
- Governing body: Ontario Parks

Since 2003, a 5,086 hectares (12,570 acres) section of the river is protected in the Goulais River Provincial Park. It is a waterway park consisting of a strip of land along both shores of the river. Some of its features includes shoreline wetlands, falls, a lake section, and stretches through talus slopes and bedrock resembling rock gardens. It is home to a self-sustaining brook trout population.

As a non-operating park, there are no visitor facilities and services.

The park is part of the Algoma Headwaters Signature Site, that also includes the Algoma Headwaters Provincial Park, Aubinadong-Nushatogaini Rivers Provincial Park, and the Ranger North Conservation Reserve.

== See also ==
- List of Ontario rivers
