= Goulais Bay 15A =

- Indian reserve
- Goulais Bay Indian Reserve No. 15A
- Location within Ontario
- Coordinates: 46°42′N 84°32′W
- Country: Canada
- Province: Ontario
- District: Algoma
- First Nation: Batchewana

Area
  - Land: 6.47 km^{2} (2.50 sq mi)

Population (2006)
  - Total: 82
  - Density: 12.7/km^{2} (33/sq mi)
- Time zone: UTC-5 (EST)
  - Summer (DST): UTC-4 (EDT)
- Website: www.batchewana.ca

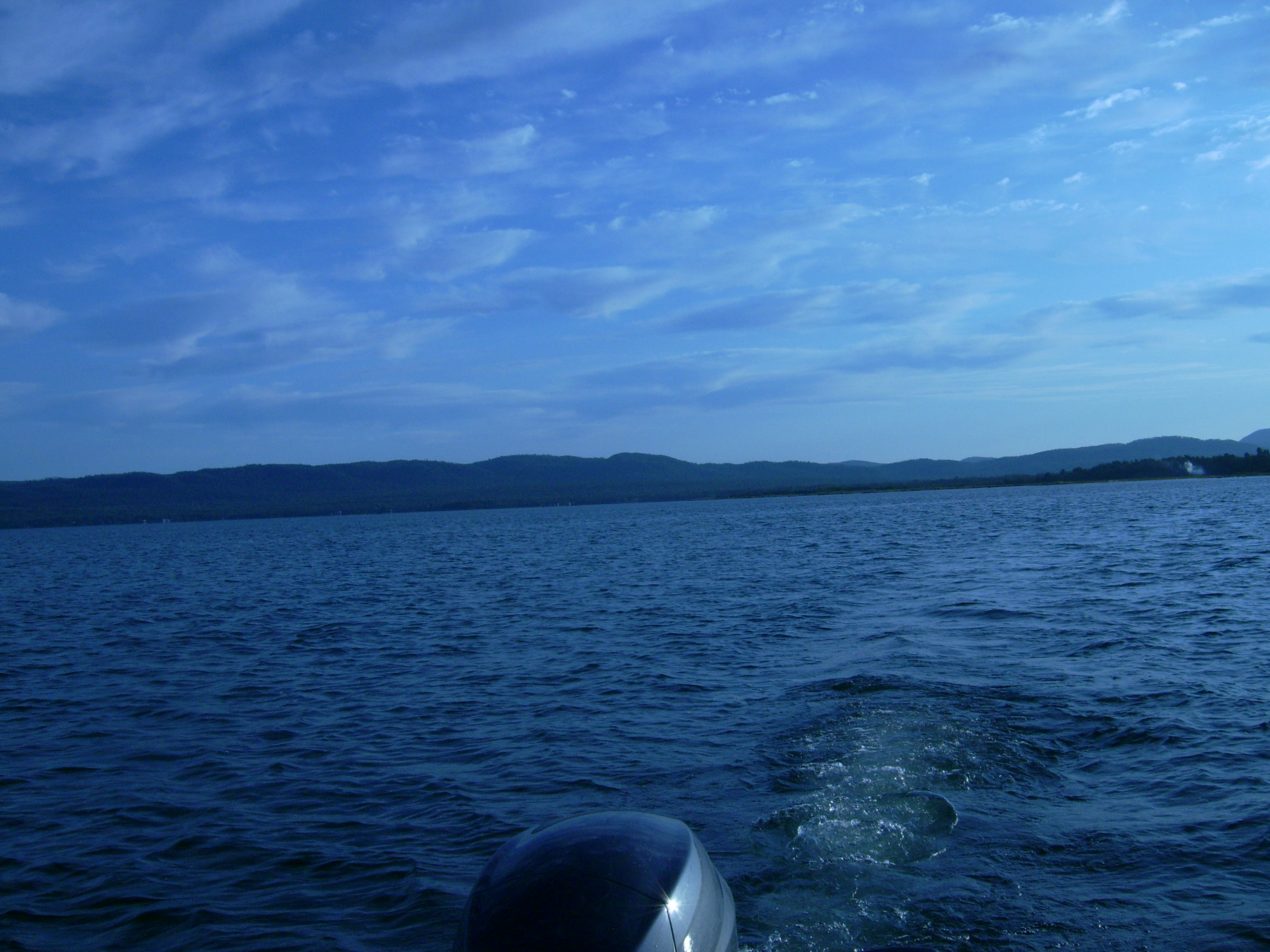
Goulais Bay

Goulais Bay 15A is a First Nations reserve in Algoma District, Ontario, Canada. It lies on Goulais Bay (of Lake Superior), encompassing most of the unincorporated community of Goulais Mission, and is one of the reserves of the Batchewana First Nation.

== History ==
The waters of Goulais Bay have served as fishing grounds for Ojibwe of southern Whitefish Bay for centuries. In 1766 Indigenous people informed Alexander Henry of excellent autumn fishing at "Oak-bay" (Goulais Bay), known to the French as "Anse a la Peche" or "Fishing Cove". In the mid-1800s a settlement of both whites and First Nations people developed north of the reserve, and in 1869 Mr. Post was conducting a large business at Ile Parisienne and shipping fish to Point aux Pins station near Sault Ste. Marie.. By 1893 the Goulais population was 150, fish dealer William Scott was resident, and ten indigenous boats fished for both local and commercial concerns. Goulais Mission fishermen at the turn of the century included Alec Robinson, Paul John (Paul Wabinong) Robinson and Abie Cress, and the Gingras family were the first fishers at Gros Cap. These commercial ventures were to a large degree financed by the Chicago-based A. Booth and Co. (later the Booth Fisheries Co.), which provided nets and paid for the one-dollar indigenous licenses.

After the expropriation of Whitefish Island from the First Nation in 1902, most residents were forced to move to Goulais Mission. On 8 January 1979, the band council paid the Crown $365.20 to purchase 6.47 km^{2} of land in and around Goulais Mission. It encompasses all of Goulais Mission, except for three parcels of waterfront property. One of these parcels of land is owned by the Roman Catholic Church and houses The Lady of Sorrows church, built by Bishop Kohler around 1860.
