= Goulais Bay =

Bay in Algoma District, Ontario, Canada

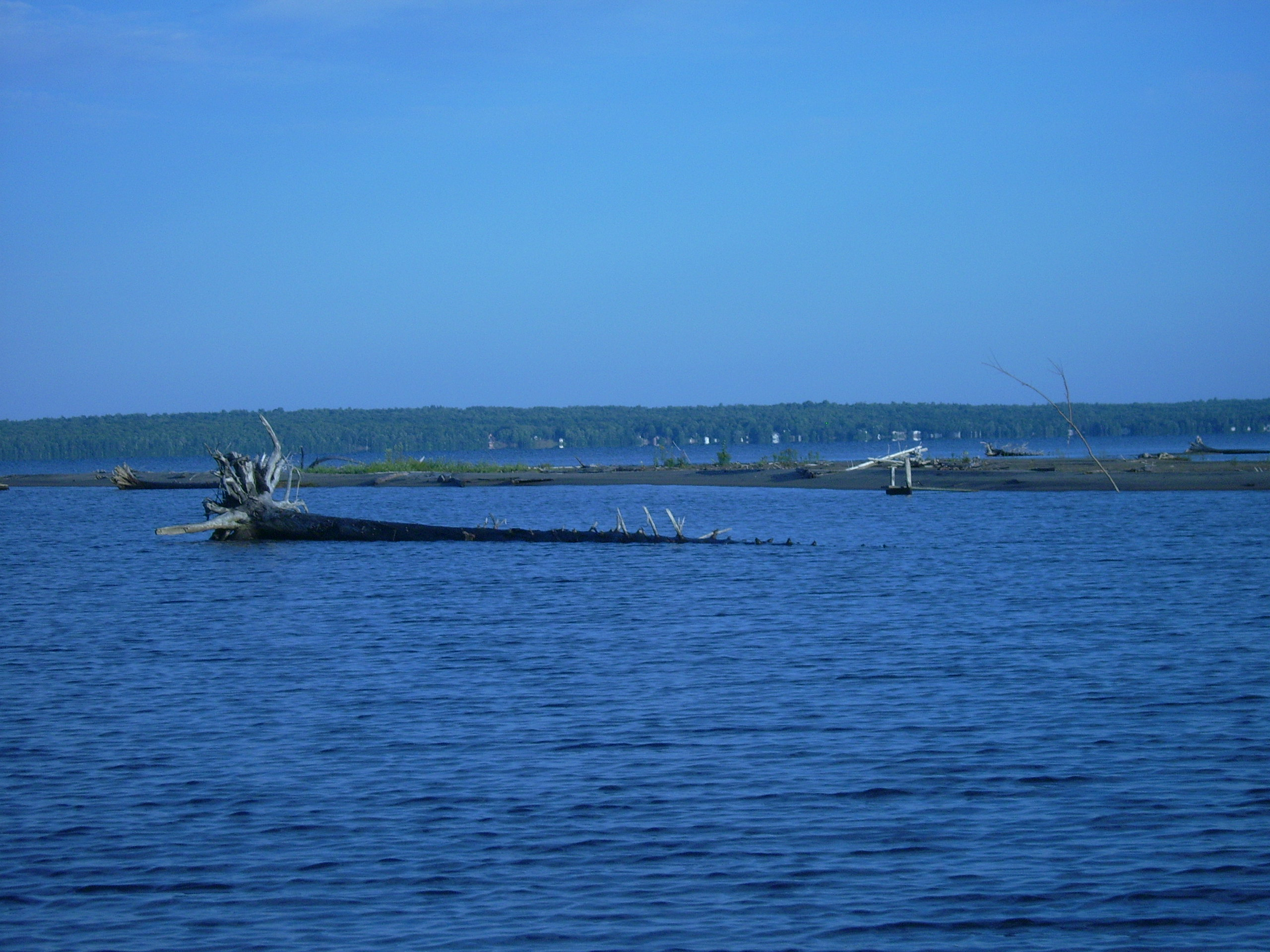
- Goulais Bay at the mouth of the Goulais River

- Location within Ontario
- Location: Algoma District, Ontario
- Coordinates: 46°42′48″N 84°28′54″W
- Part of: Whitefish Bay
- Primary inflows: Goulais River

Goulais Bay is a bay of Ontario in Canada. It is part of Whitefish Bay which in turn is a large bay of Lake Superior. Goulais Point, on the southernmost tip of the peninsula that separates the bay from Batchawana Bay just to the north and from Whitefish Bay to the west, marks the northern entrance of Goulais Bay. North Gros Cap is the rock point that forms the bay's southern limit.

The dispersed rural community of Goulais Bay is near the mouth of the Goulais River that empties into the bay's east side. On the western shore of the bay is the community of Goulais Mission.

== See also ==
- Unorganized North Algoma District
