= Obadjiwan 15E =

- Indian reserve
- Obadjiwan Indian Reserve No. 15E
- Location within Ontario
- Coordinates: 46°53.5′N 84°37′W
- Country: Canada
- Province: Ontario
- District: Algoma
- First Nation: Batchewana

Area
  - Land: 0.68 km^{2} (0.26 sq mi)
- Time zone: UTC-5 (EST)
  - Summer (DST): UTC-4 (EDT)
- Website: www.batchewana.ca

Obadjiwan 15E is a First Nations reserve in Algoma District, Ontario. It consists of two non-contiguous parcels of land on Batchewana Bay (Lake Superior), and is one of the reserves of the Batchewana First Nation.

== History ==
The land was originally set apart for the Department of Marine and Fisheries to build the Corbeil Point Lighthouse by order in council on 29 May 1874.

On 23 January 1964, the Department of Transportation and Communication gave these two parcels of land to the Department of Indian Affairs, which was made into a reserve on 6 December 1966.
