= Whitefish Island =

- Indian reserve
- Whitefish Island Indian Reserve
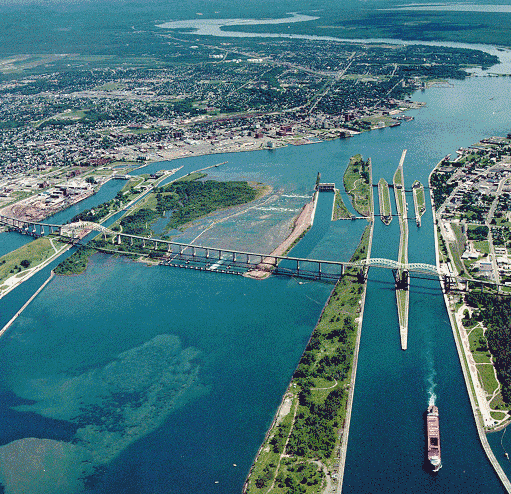
- Aerial view of the St. Marys River; Whitefish Island is just to the left of the rapids.

- Location within Ontario
- Coordinates: 46°31′N 84°21′W
- Country: Canada
- Province: Ontario
- District: Algoma
- First Nation: Batchewana

Area
  - Land: 0.17 km^{2} (0.066 sq mi)

Population (2011)
  - Total: 0
  - Density: 0/km^{2} (0/sq mi)
- Time zone: UTC-5 (EST)
  - Summer (DST): UTC-4 (EDT)
- Website: www.batchewana.ca

National Historic Site of Canada
- Official name: Whitefish Island National Historic Site of Canada
- Designated: 1981

Whitefish Island is an island in the St. Marys River, just south of Sault Ste. Marie, in Ontario, Canada.

== History ==
It was a fishing station for the Anishenabek of the Great Lakes region for over 2,000 years. It was reserved for the use of Chief Nebenaigoching and his band in the Robinson Huron Treaty, 1850 with the British Crown. In 1895, it became part of the west side of the Sault Ste. Marie Canal.

After it was taken in a series of expropriations from 1902 to 1913 for railway purposes, it became a park in the Parks Canada national inventory. The island was designated a National Historic Site of Canada in 1981.

A land claim was filed in 1982 by the Batchewana Indian Band, of the Batchewana First Nation, for the 22-acre (89,000 m^{2}) island. After years of unsuccessful negotiations, hereditary Chief Edward James Sayers Nebenaigoching occupied the island from 1989 until the claim was settled in 1992. $3.5 million in damages were paid to the tribe, and the island was returned to Indian reserve status in 1997.

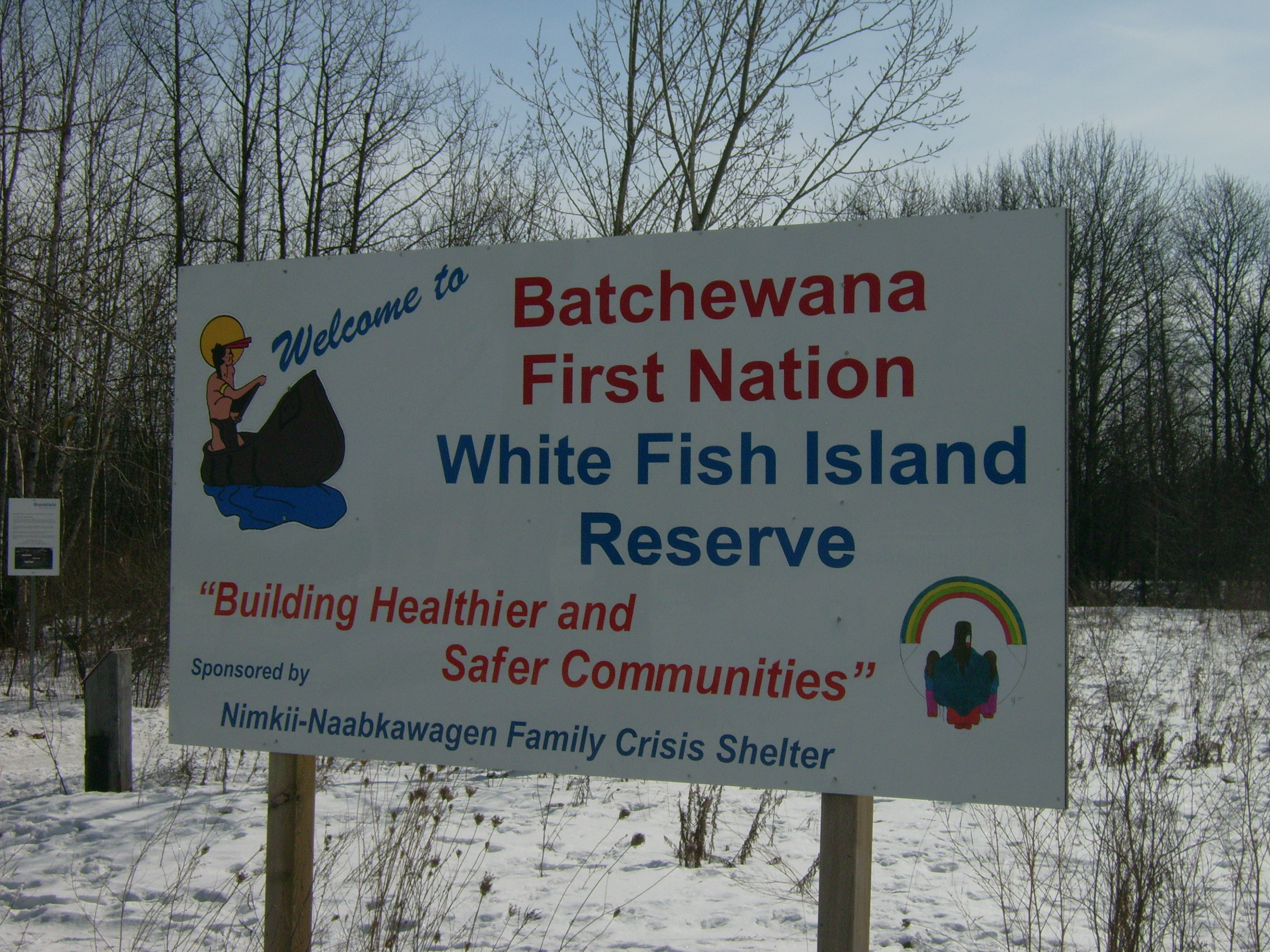
Welcome to White Fish Island

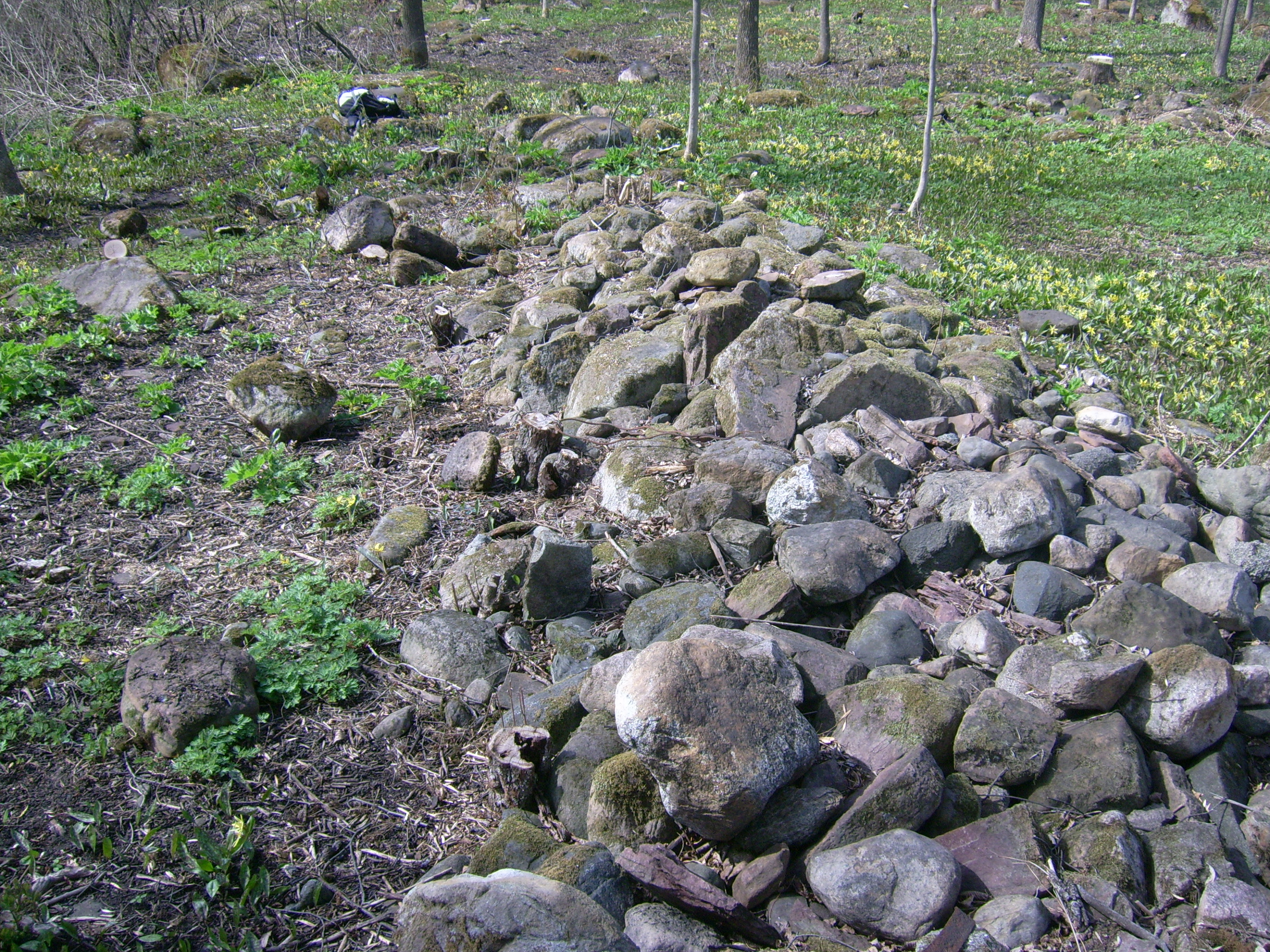
Ancient fishing weir

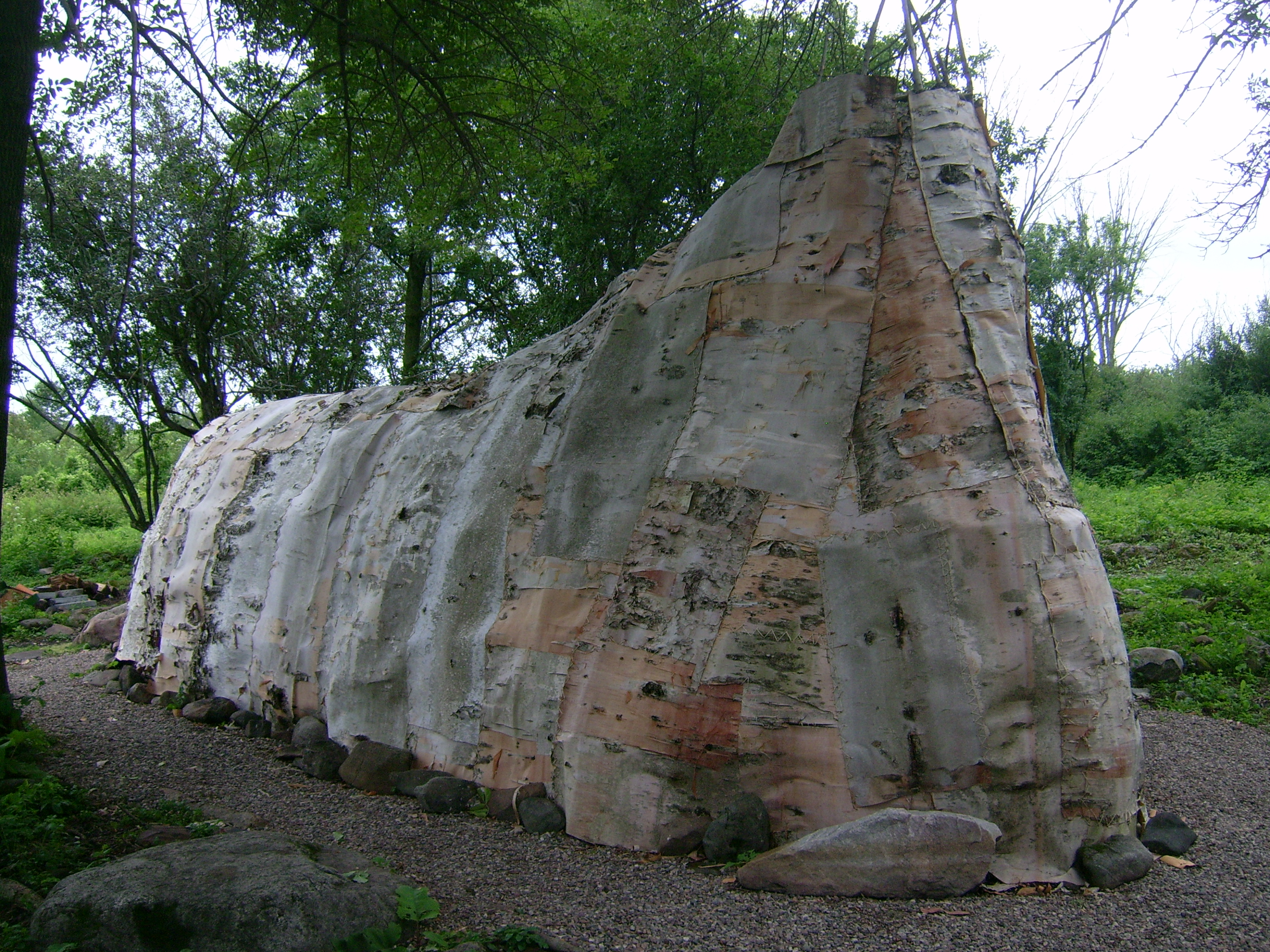
Birch bark longhouse

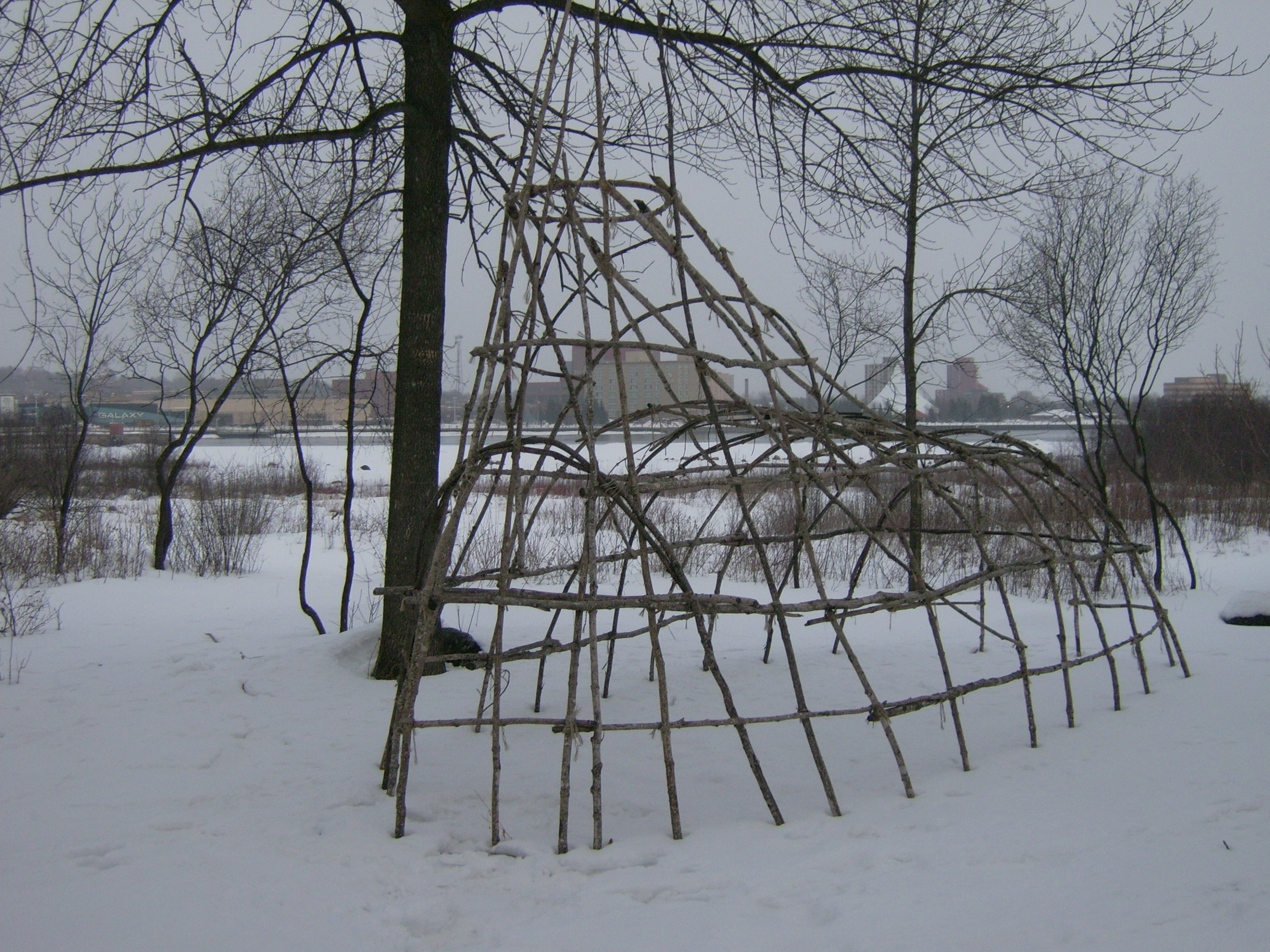
Longhouse in winter

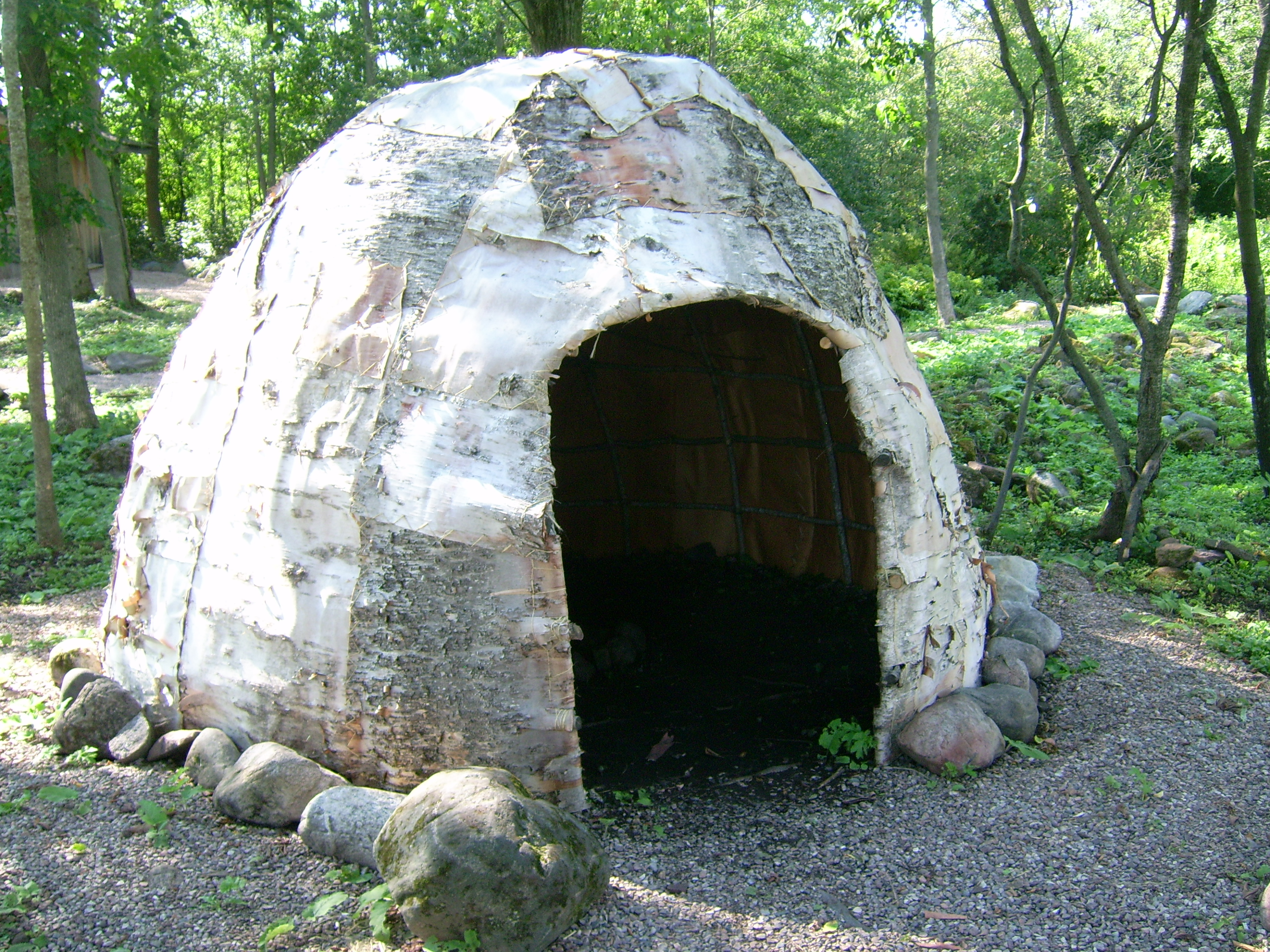
Birch bark lodge

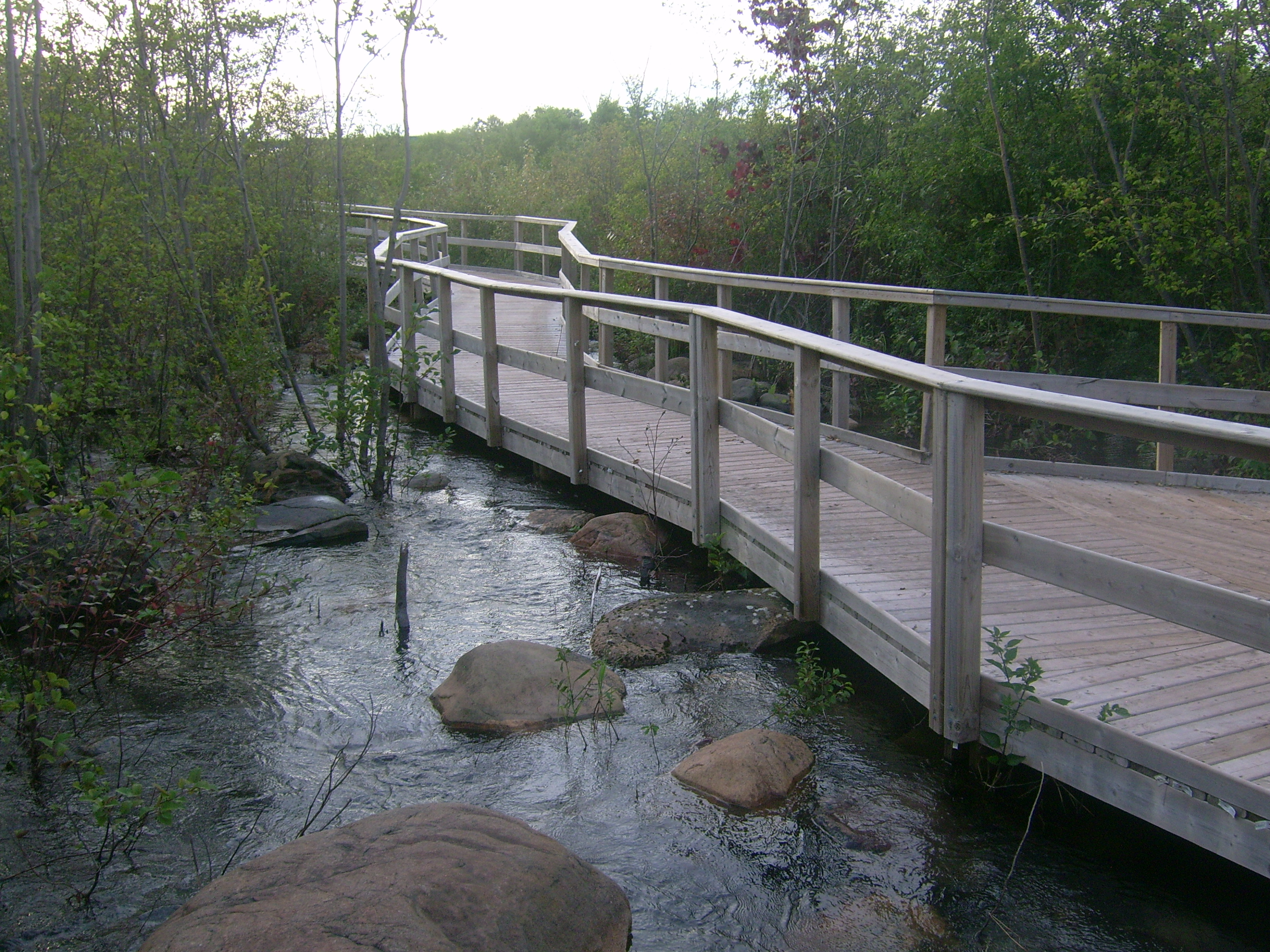
Boardwalk with 7 flood control gates open (equivalent).

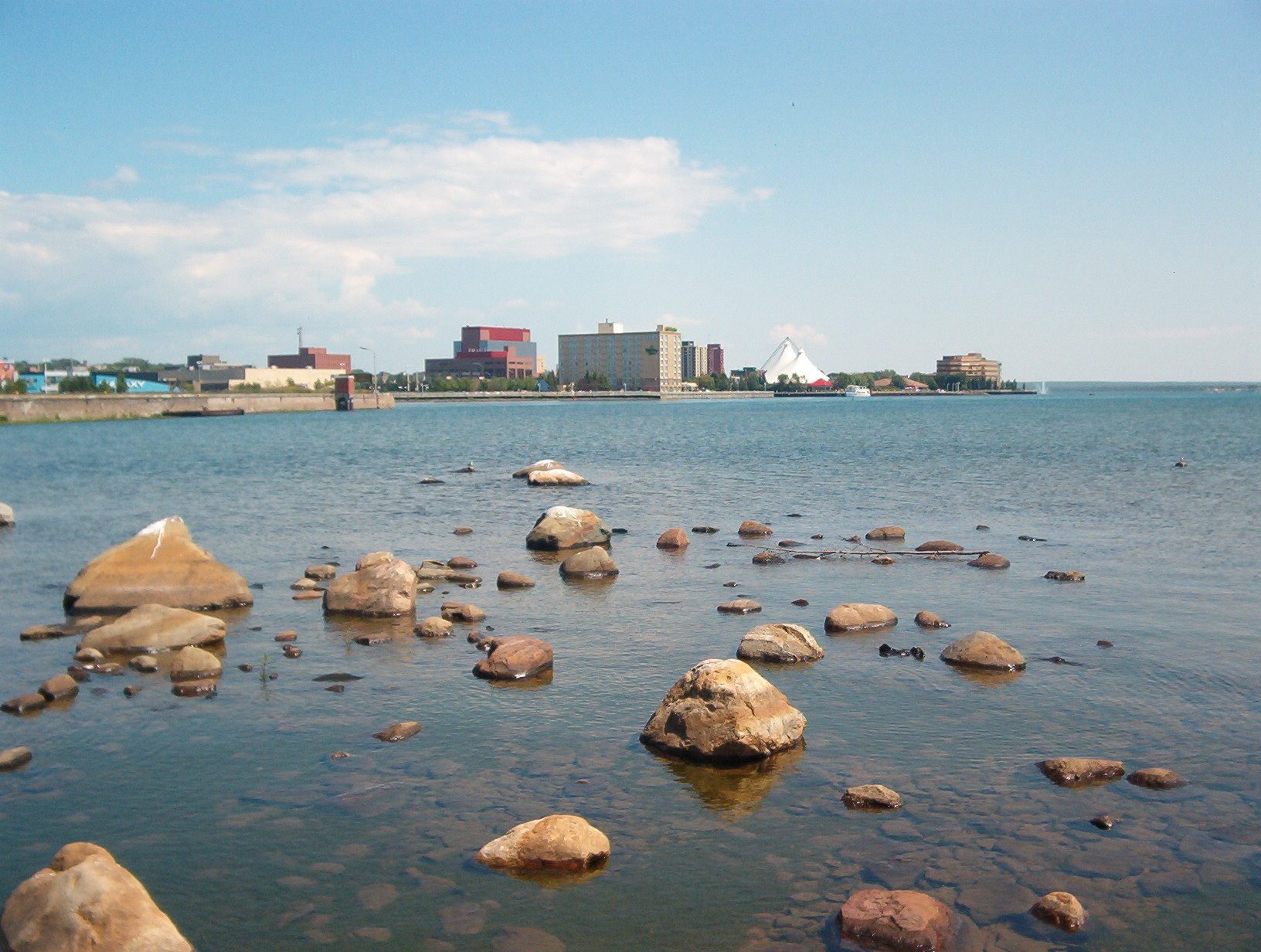
Sault Ste. Marie waterfront, as seen from Whitefish Island

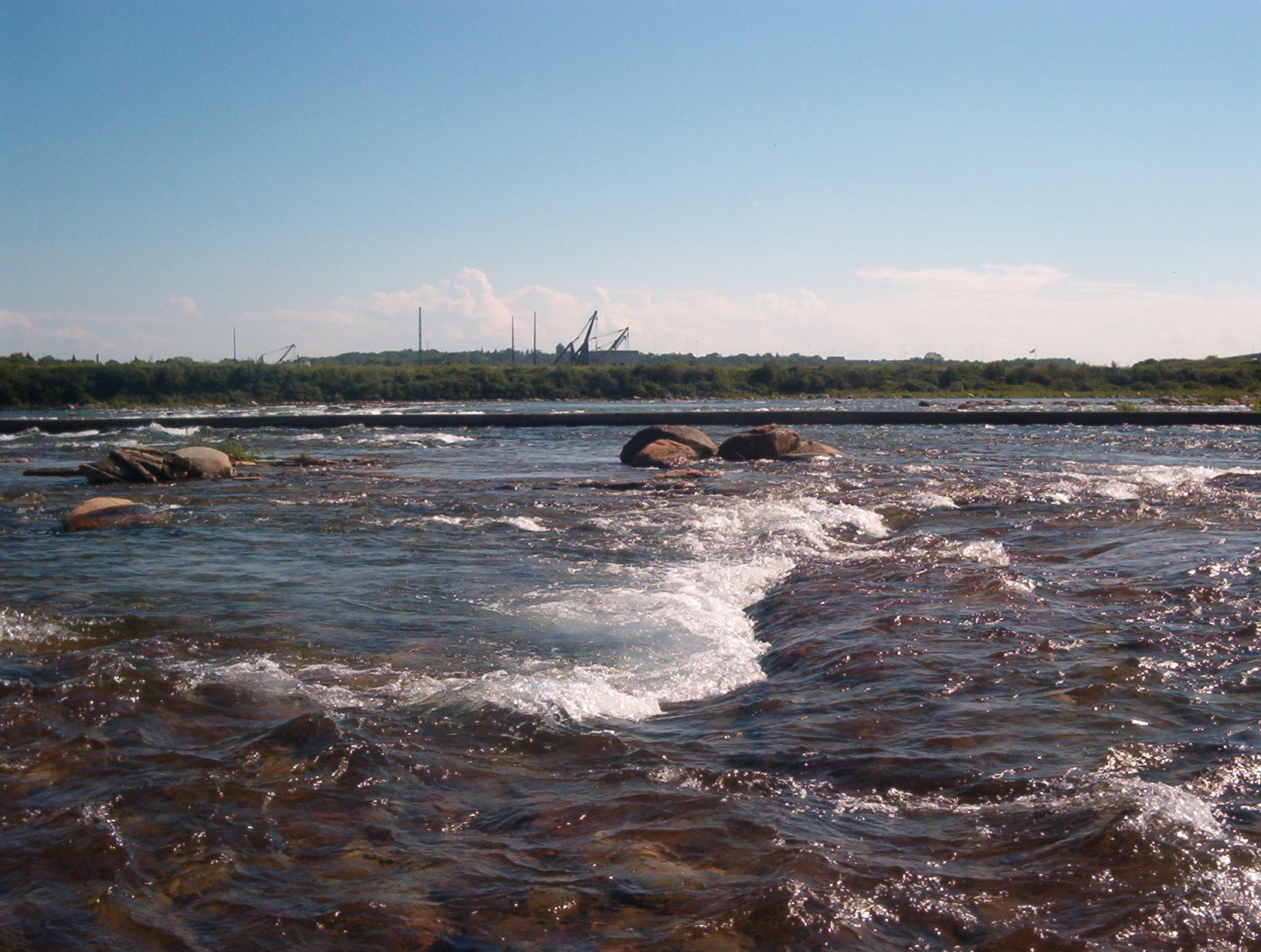
St. Marys Rapids

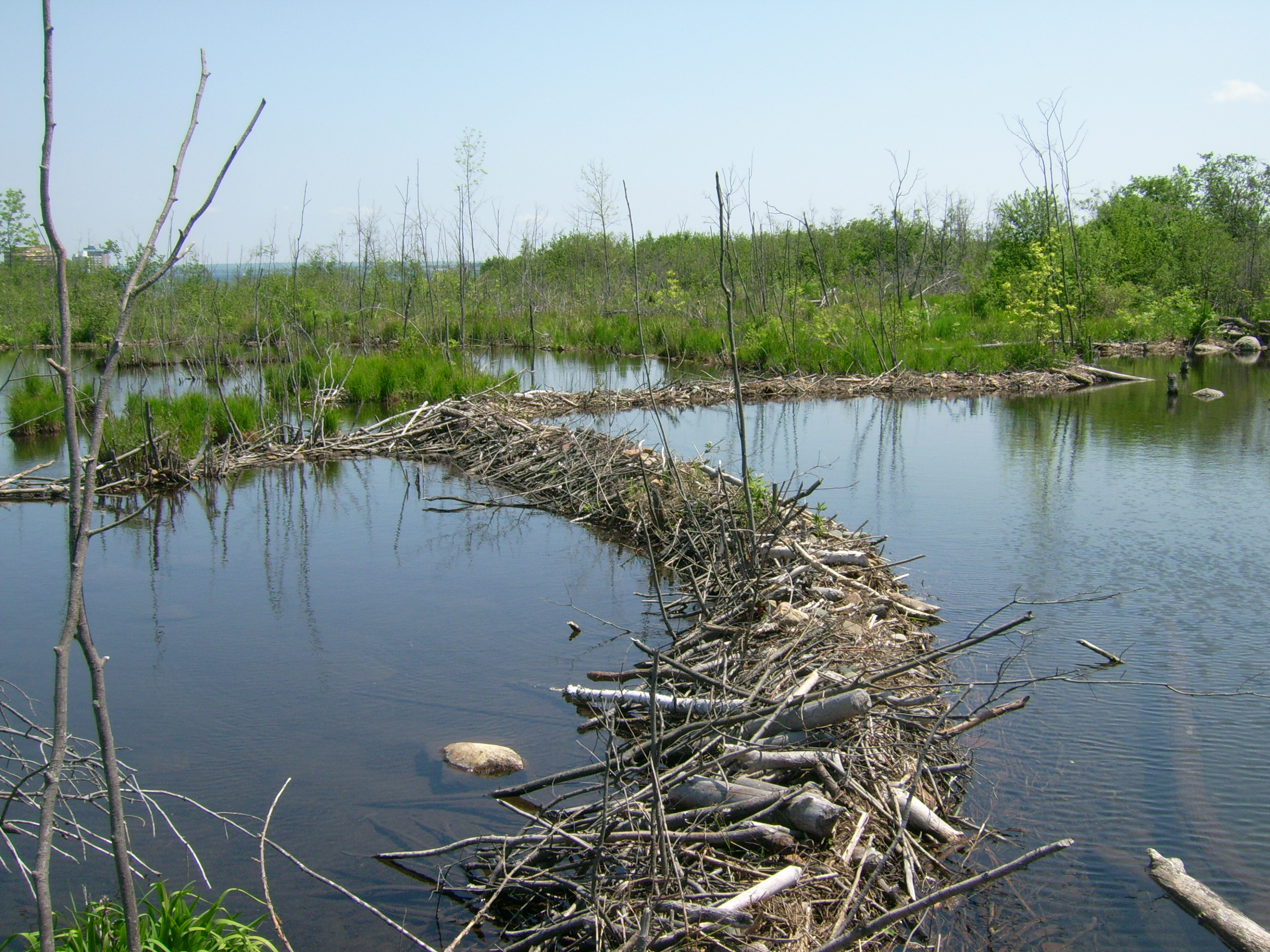
Beaver dams along Whitefish Channel

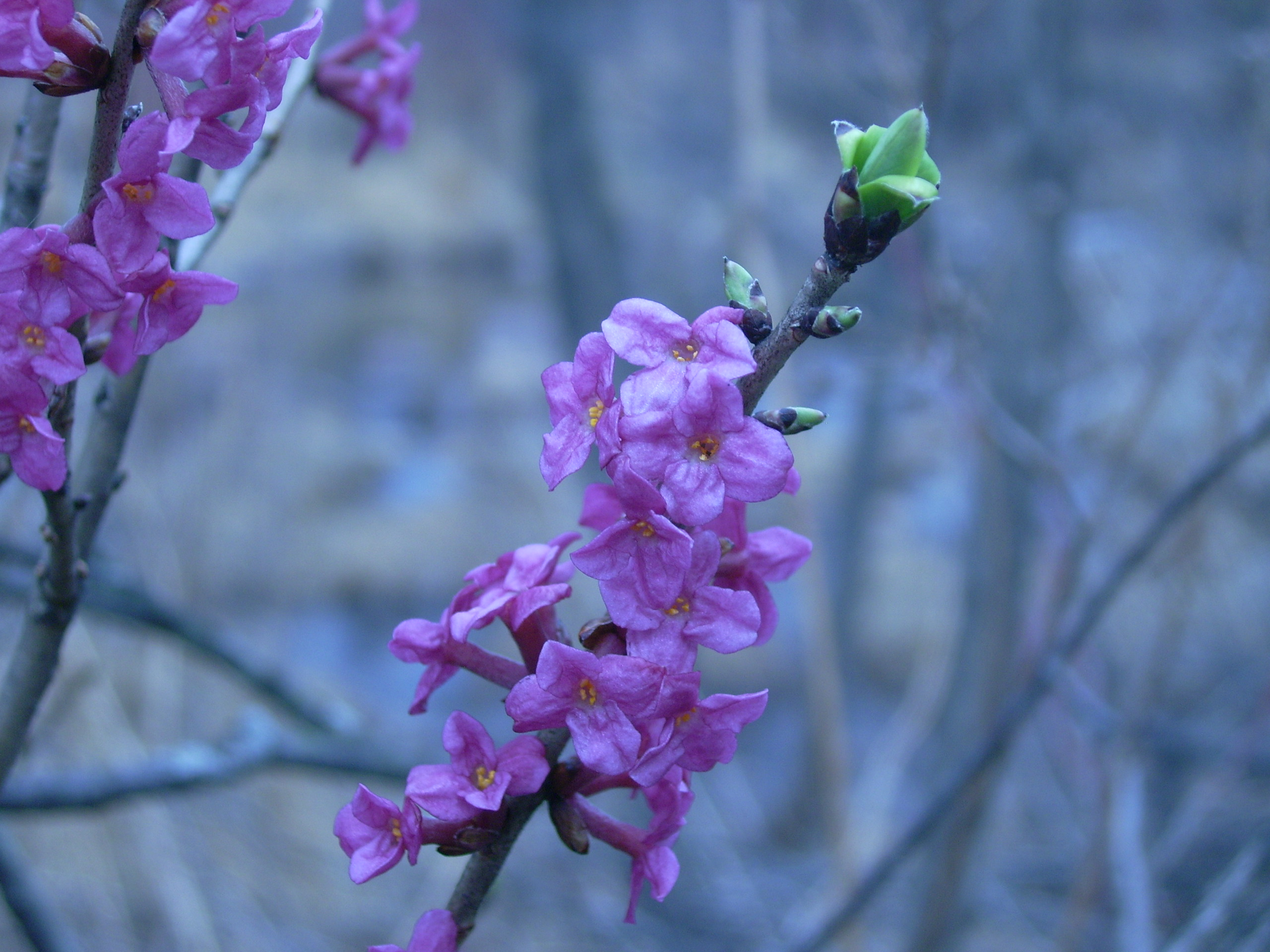
February daphne flowers

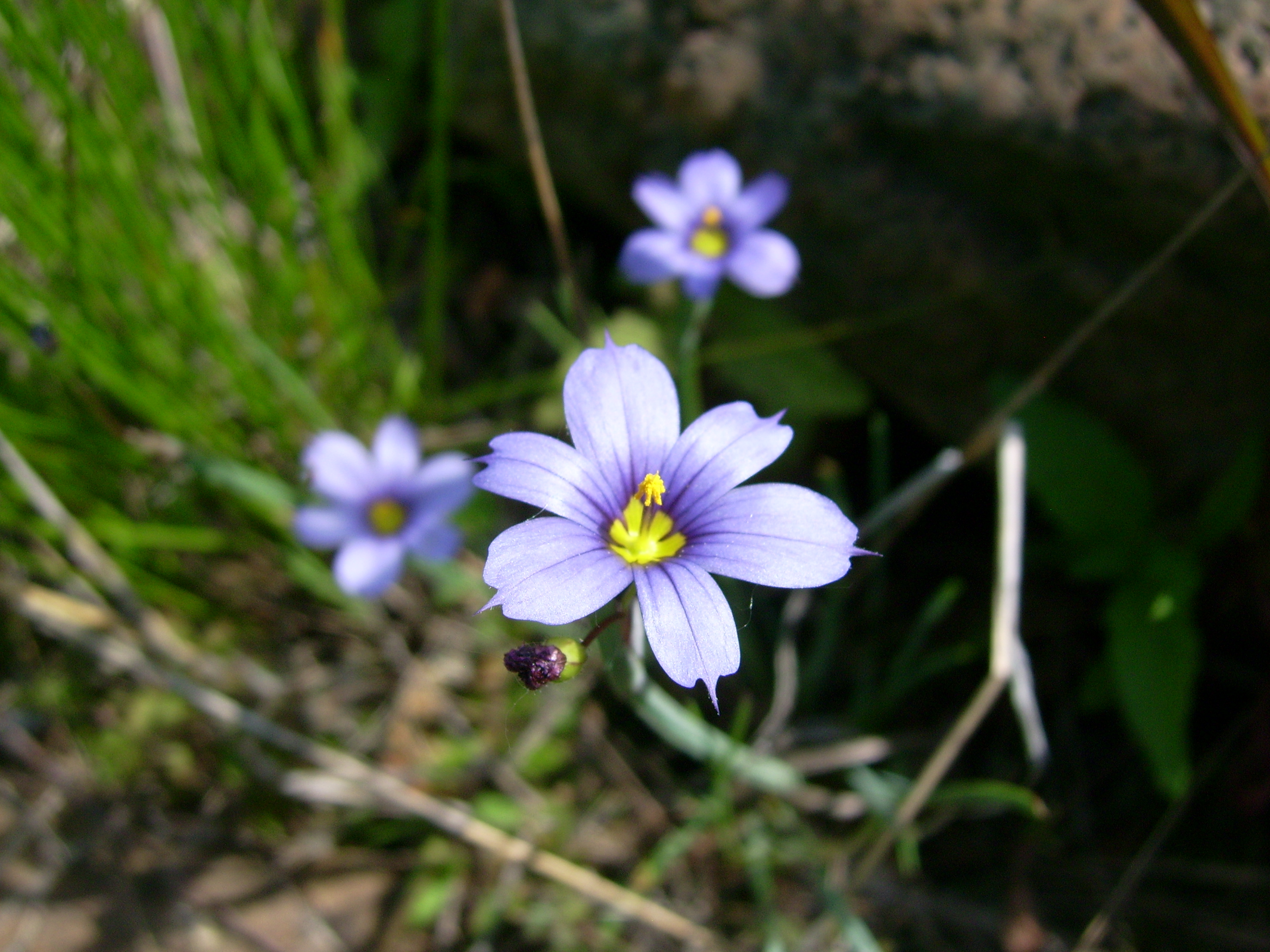
Narrow-leaf blue-eyed grass flowers near the St. Marys Rapids

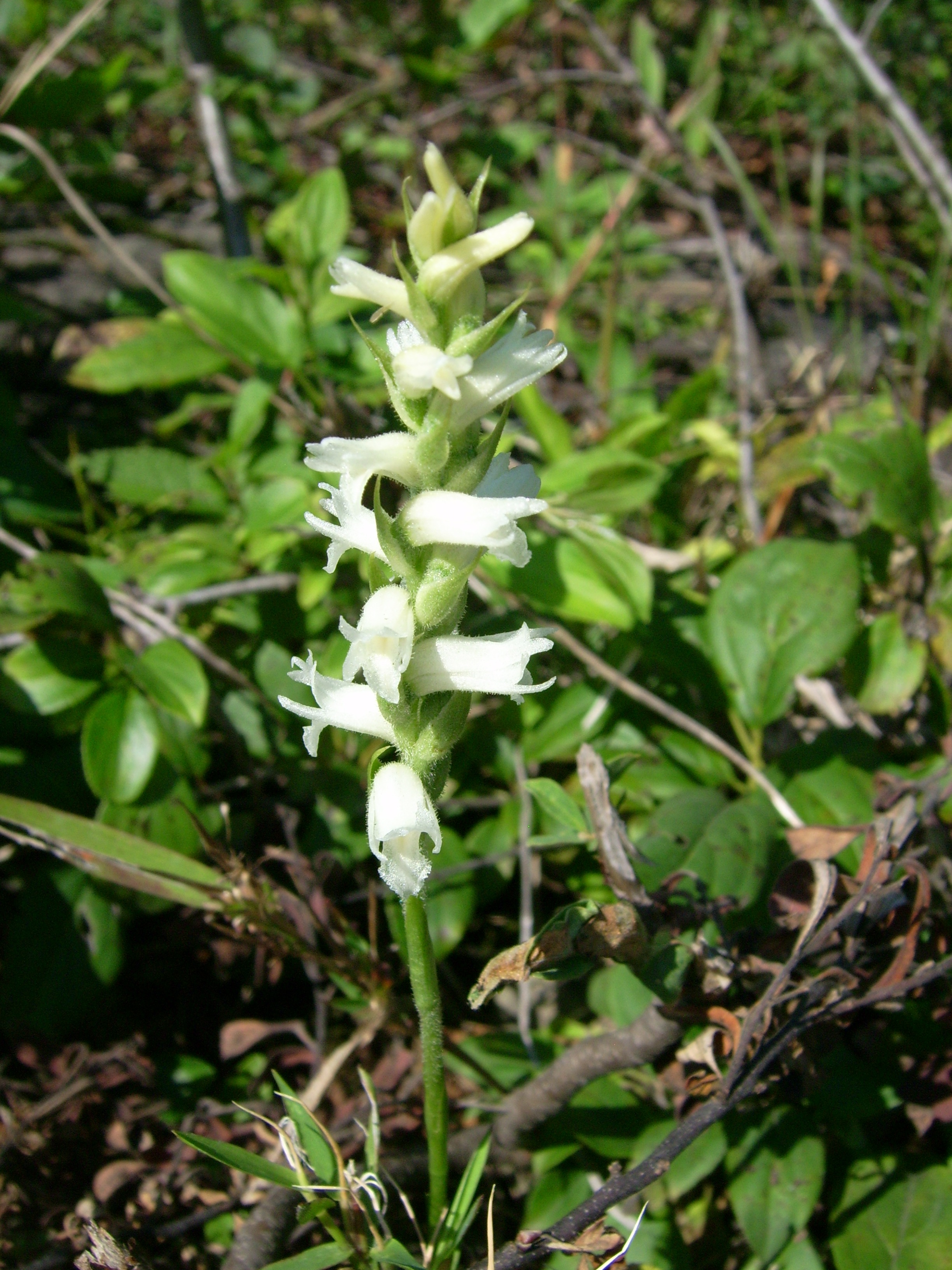
Nodding ladies'-tresses

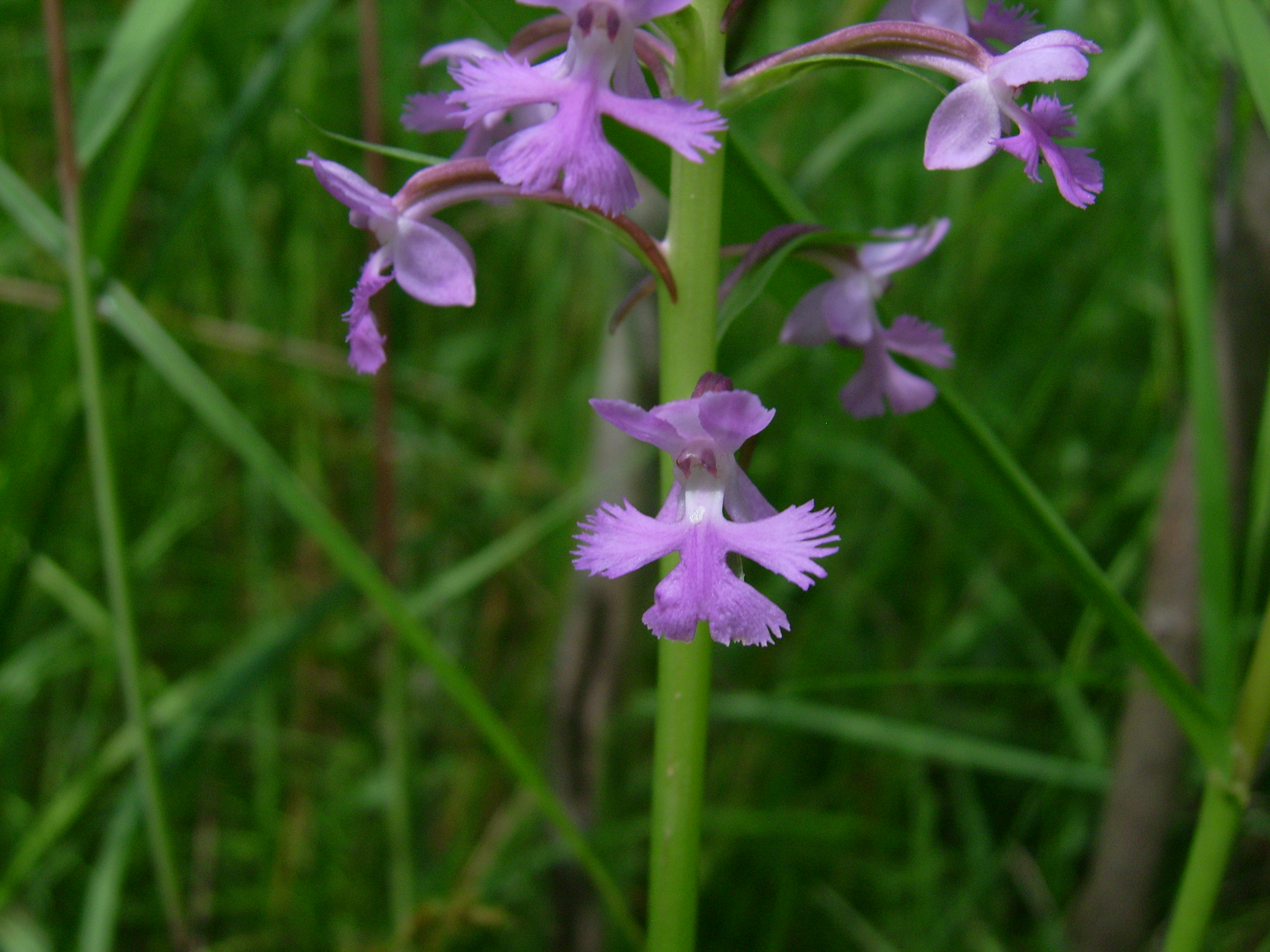
Small purple fringed orchid

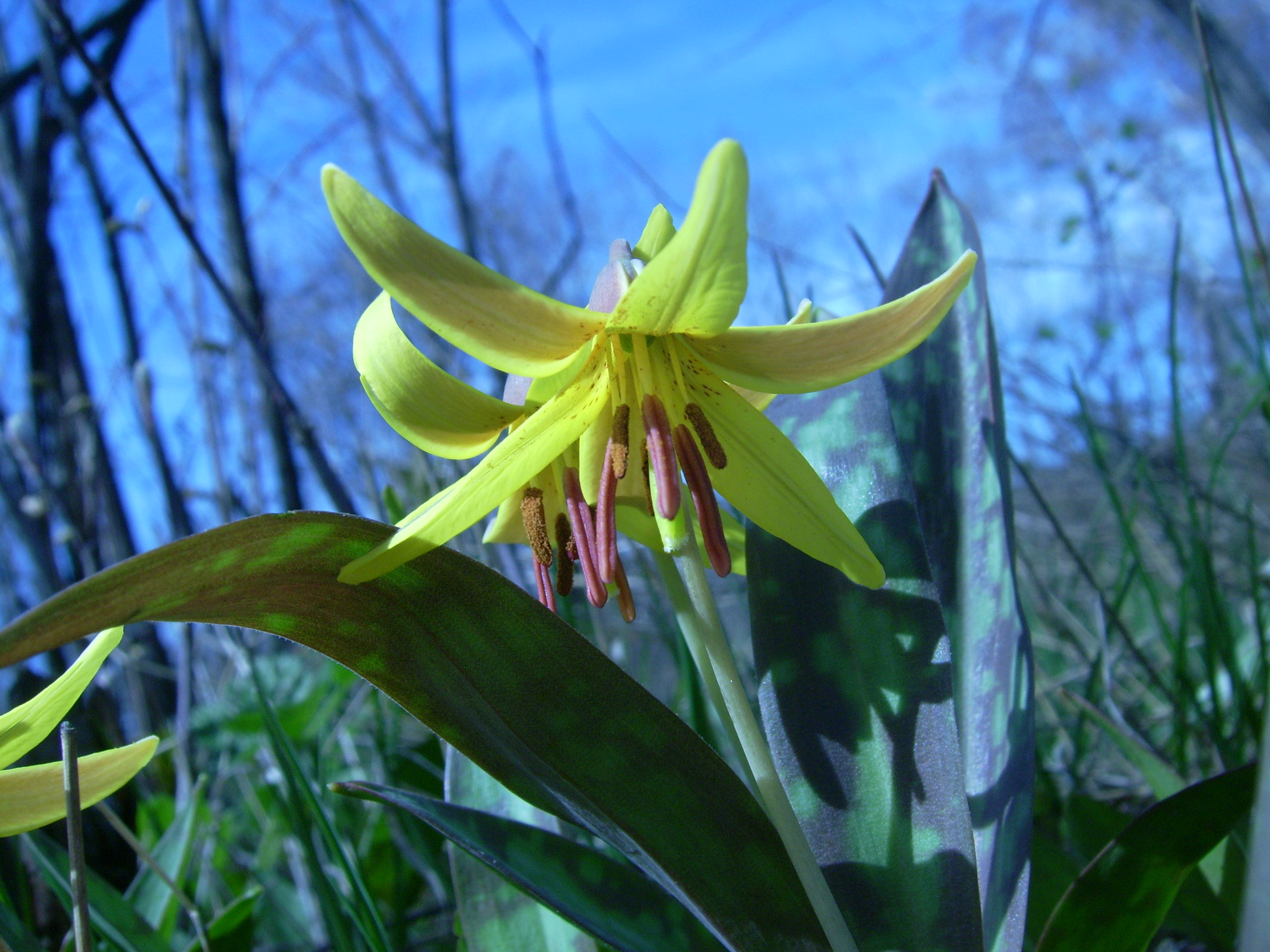
Trout-lily flower in early spring

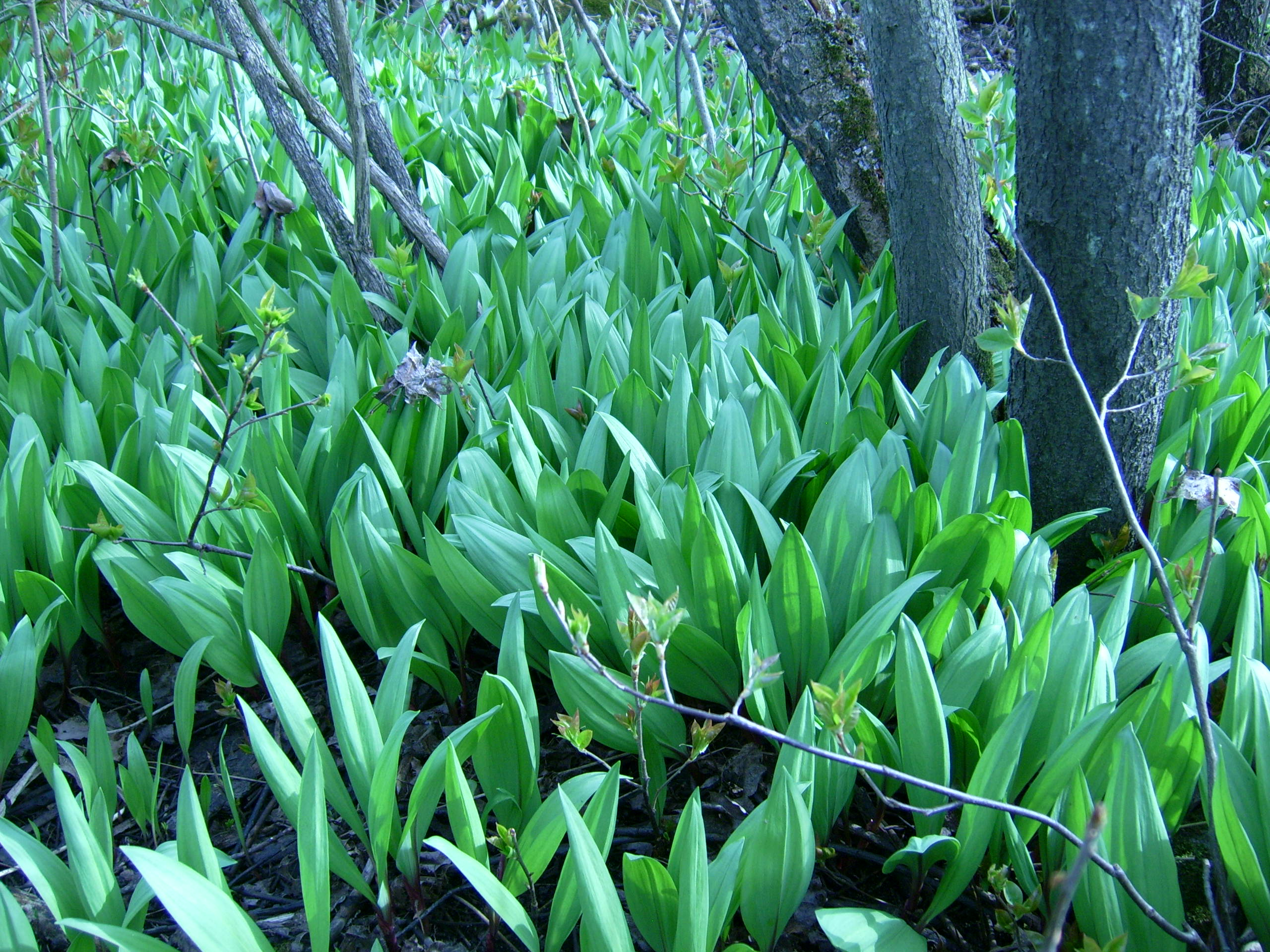
Wild leek in early spring

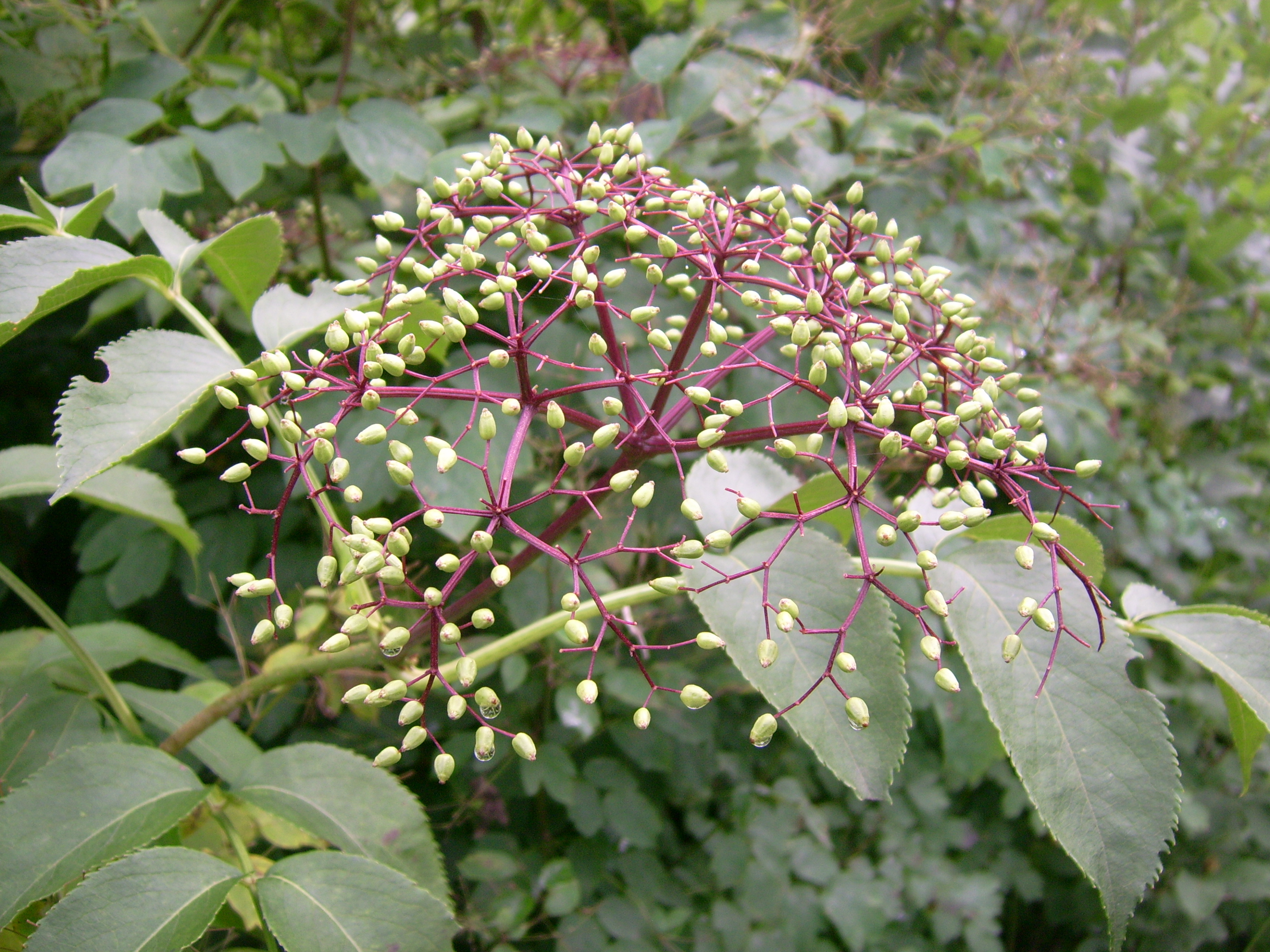
Wild raisin in fruit

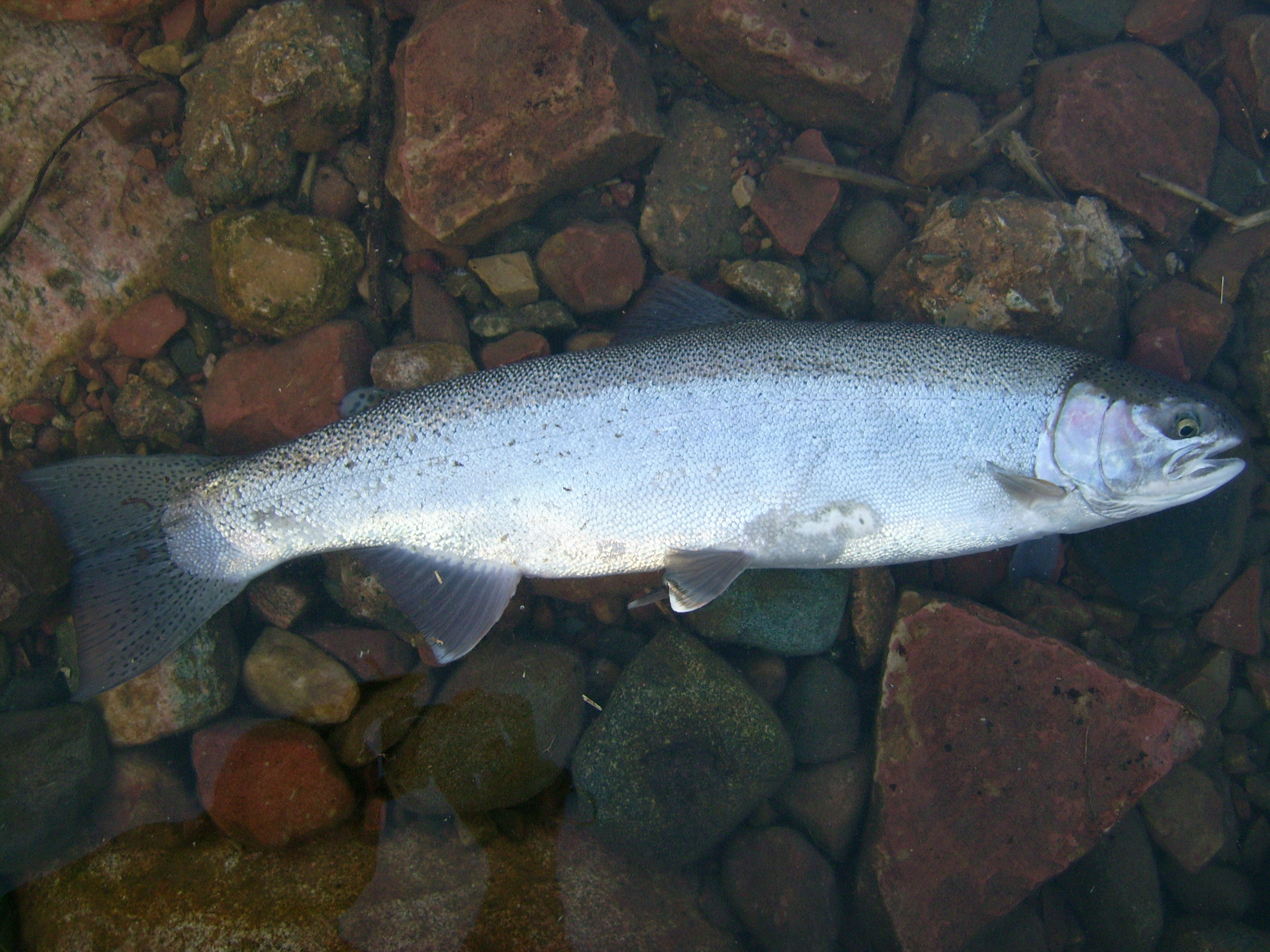
Steelhead trout caught in the St. Marys Rapids (introduced species)
