= List of provincial parks of Northern Ontario =

This is a list of provincial parks in Northern Ontario. These provincial parks are maintained by Ontario Parks. For a list of other provincial parks in Ontario, see the List of provincial parks in Ontario.

== Algoma District ==
Name	Established	Commons category	Image	Coordinates
Algoma Headwaters Provincial Park	2003			47.136605°N 83.610633°W
Aubinadong River Provincial Park	2002			47.057604°N 83.323842°W
Aubinadong-Nushatogaini Rivers Provincial Park	2003			47.092433°N 83.503435°W
Aubrey Falls Provincial Park	1985			46.953888888889°N 83.168611111111°W
Batchawana Bay Provincial Park	1973	Batchawana Bay Provincial Park		46.9425°N 84.5581°W
Batchawana River Provincial Park	2004			47.133791°N 84.415006°W
Blind River Provincial Park	2002			46.50681°N 82.932271°W
Goulais River Provincial Park	2003			46.997313°N 83.912727°W
Lake Superior Provincial Park	1944	Lake Superior Provincial Park		47.5967°N 84.7414°W
Little White River Provincial Park	2002			46.561848°N 83.041987°W
Matinenda Provincial Park	2003			46.357235°N 82.935393°W
Michipicoten Provincial Park	1982			47.925277777778°N 84.8375°W
Mississagi Delta Provincial Nature Reserve	1985			46.169°N 83.07032°W
Mississagi Provincial Park	1973			46.5881°N 82.6881°W
Montreal River Provincial Park	1968			47.21986°N 84.6542°W
Nagagami Lake Provincial Nature Reserve	1985			49.4336111°N 84.9694444°W
Nagagamisis Provincial Park	1957			49.44444444°N 84.64444444°W
Nimoosh Provincial Park	2002			48.027671°N 85.210633°W
North Channel Inshore Provincial Park	2002			46.195705°N 83.078472°W
Obatanga Provincial Park	1967			48.323611111111°N 85.092777777778°W
Pancake Bay Provincial Park	1968	Pancake Bay Provincial Park		46.9667°N 84.6833°W
Pichogen River Mixed Forest Provincial Park	2003			48.936206°N 83.987821°W
Pokei Lake/White River Wetlands Provincial Park	2000			48.485143°N 85.239244°W
Potholes Provincial Nature Reserve	1985			47.9532°N 84.26223°W
River Aux Sables Provincial Park	2006			46.453055555556°N 82.18°W
Sandy Islands Provincial Park	2001			46.8167°N 84.65°W

== Cochrane District ==
Name	Established	Coordinates
Abitibi-De-Troyes Provincial Park	1985	48.790555555556°N 80.033888888889°W
Adam Creek Provincial Nature Reserve	1985	50.2372222°N 82.0991666°W
Coral Rapids Provincial Nature Reserve	1985	50.2422222°N 81.6666666°W
Dana-Jowsey Lakes Provincial Park	1989	48.345277777778°N 81.8025°W
Esker Lakes Provincial Park	1957	48.320277777778°N 79.8775°W
Frederick House Lake Provincial Nature Reserve	1985	48.68191°N 80.9649°W
Fushimi Lake Provincial Park	1979	49.82°N 83.917222222222°W
Greenwater Provincial Park	1957	49.215°N 81.2825°W
Groundhog River Waterway Provincial Park	2006	49.057904°N 82.122609°W
Hicks-Oke Bog Provincial Nature Reserve	1994	48.906771°N 82.077344°W
Kesagami Provincial Park	1983	50.331944444444°N 80.2675°W
Kettle Lakes Provincial Park	1957	48.57°N 80.87°W
Lake Abitibi Islands Provincial Park	2005	48.761834°N 79.922836°W
Little Abitibi Provincial Park	1985	49.53°N 80.78°W
Little Current River Provincial Park	1989	50.715555555556°N 86.184444444444°W
Mattagami River Beach and Aeolian Deposit Provincial Park	2003	50.095662°N 82.200572°W
North Driftwood River Provincial Nature Reserve	1985	49.36609°N 81.31062°W
Pushkin Hills Provincial Nature Reserve	1985	48.2944445°N 79.6733333°W
René Brunelle Provincial Park	1957	49.417357°N 82.139301°W
Sextant Rapids Provincial Nature Reserve	1985	50.2027778°N 81.6463889°W
Shallow River Provincial Nature Reserve	1985	48.64072°N 80.53287°W
Thackeray Provincial Nature Reserve	1985	48.4483334°N 79.9219444°W
Tidewater Provincial Park	1970	51.2625°N 80.625°W
Wildgoose Outwash Deposit Provincial Park	2002	48.389012°N 80.434952°W
Williams Island Provincial Nature Reserve	1985	50.39958°N 81.57°W

== Kenora District ==
Name	Established	Image	Coordinates
Aaron Provincial Park	1958		49.7617°N 92.6565°W
Albany River Provincial Park	1989		51.3625°N 87.775°W
Beekahncheekahmeeng Deebahncheekayweehn Eenahohnahnuhn	2011		51.767°N 93.673°W
Blue Lake Provincial Park	1990		49.8933°N 93.5414°W
Bonheur River Kame Provincial Nature Reserve	1985		49.3994°N 91.2336°W
Butler Lake Provincial Nature Reserve	1985		49.6947222°N 92.72°W
Eagle-Dogtooth Provincial Park	2003		49.749005°N 93.720997°W
East English River Provincial Park	2003		49.774002°N 91.486998°W
Fawn River Provincial Park	1989		53.8325°N 89.544166666667°W
Kahnahmaykoosayseekahk	2011		51.31513°N 94.134987°W
Lake of the Woods Provincial Park	1967		49.028055555556°N 94.630277777778°W
Lola Lake Provincial Nature Reserve	1985		49.81542°N 92.54491°W
Maynard Lake Provincial Nature Reserve	1997		50.371944444444°N 93.878888888889°W
Minnitaki Kames Provincial Park	1989		49.9°N 91.8667°W
Ojibway Provincial Park	1963		49.995°N 92.1325°W
Opasquia Provincial Park	1983		53.5333°N 93.0833°W
Otoskwin-Attawapiskat River Provincial Park	1989		52.171388888889°N 87.583888888889°W
Pahngwahshahshk Ohweemushkeeg	2011		52.125°N 93.293°W
Pakwash Provincial Park	1967		50.784°N 93.445°W
Pipestone River Provincial Park	1989		52.288611111111°N 90.5175°W
Polar Bear Provincial Park	1970		54.7617°N 83.0388°W
Rushing River Provincial Park	1958		49.6816°N 94.2359°W
Sahkeesuhkuh Weesuhkaheegahn	2011		51.553779°N 93.477173°W
Sandbar Lake Provincial Park	1970		49.494°N 91.574°W
Severn River Provincial Park	1989		54.130555555556°N 90.594166666667°W
Sioux Narrows Provincial Park	1957		49.424166666667°N 94.05°W
Tide Lake Provincial Nature Reserve	1997		50.319564°N 93.994071°W
Trout Lake Provincial Nature Reserve	1989		51.14121°N 93.45567°W
Turtle River-White Otter Lake Provincial Park	1989		49.208333333333°N 92.120833333333°W
Weeskayjahk Ohtahzhoganeeng	2011		51.689°N 94.494°W
West English River Provincial Park	2003		50.428491°N 93.876086°W
Windigo Point Provincial Nature Reserve	1989		50.378139°N 92.735736°W
Winisk River Provincial Park	1969		53.169444°N 87.475°W
Winnange Lake Provincial Park	1985		49.781944444444°N 93.681388888889°W
Woodland Caribou Provincial Park	1983		51.0667°N 94.85°W

== Greater Sudbury ==
Name	Established	Coordinates
Daisy Lake Uplands Provincial Park	2006	46.460077°N 80.880399°W
Fairbank Provincial Park	1957	46.471944444444°N 81.441111111111°W

== Manitoulin District ==
Name	Established	Coordinates
Blue Jay Creek Provincial Park	1997	45.595°N 82.08°W
Misery Bay Provincial Nature Reserve	1989	45.789777°N 82.721606°W
Queen Elizabeth The Queen Mother Mnidoo Mnissing Provincial Park	2014	45.864537°N 82.974586°W

== Nipissing District ==
Name	Established	Commons category	Image	Coordinates
Alexander Lake Forest Provincial Park	2003			46.460286°N 78.9198°W
Algonquin Provincial Park	1893-05-23	Algonquin Provincial Park		45.8°N 78.7°W
Amable du Fond River Provincial Park	2003			46.178646°N 78.917395°W
Finlayson Point Provincial Park	1963	Finlayson Point Provincial Park		47.0553°N 79.8047°W
Jocko Rivers Provincial Park	2003			46.648932°N 79.269415°W
Kenny Forest Provincial Park	1994			46.725833333333°N 79.6925°W
Manitou Islands Provincial Nature Reserve	1989			46.266034°N 79.581236°W
Marten River Provincial Park	1990	Marten River Provincial Park		46.7236°N 79.8145°W
Mattawa River Provincial Park	1970			46.312619444444°N 79.093138888889°W
Opeongo River Provincial Park	1990			45.5817°N 77.8942°W
Samuel de Champlain Provincial Park	1990	Samuel de Champlain Provincial Park		46.291666666667°N 78.875°W
Temagami River Provincial Park	2000			46.687222222222°N 79.995°W
Upper Madawaska River Provincial Park	1989			45.4933°N 78.0986°W
West Sandy Island Provincial Nature Reserve	1994			46.237741°N 79.914541°W
Widdifield Forest Provincial Park	2002			46.447321°N 79.325333°W

== Parry Sound District ==
Name	Established	Commons category	Image	Coordinates
French River Provincial Park	1989			45.965555555556°N 80.870833333333°W
Grundy Lake Provincial Park	1959	Grundy Lake Provincial Park		45.933333333333°N 80.55°W
Killbear Provincial Park	1960	Killbear Provincial Park		45.3597°N 80.2197°W
Limestone Islands Provincial Nature Reserve	1980			45.39072°N 80.53233°W
Magnetawan River Provincial Park	2003			45.6333°N 80°W
Mikisew Provincial Park	1964			45.821944444444°N 79.511388888889°W
Noganosh Lake Provincial Park	2003			45.822268°N 80.229604°W
Oastler Lake Provincial Park	1967			45.3107°N 79.9634°W
Restoule Provincial Park	1963			46.0672°N 79.7733°W
Round Lake Provincial Nature Reserve	1989			45.516944444444°N 80.174444444444°W
South Bay Provincial Park	1985			46.126666666667°N 79.606666666667°W
Sturgeon Bay Provincial Park	1960			45.623611111111°N 80.415277777778°W
The Massasauga Provincial Park	1989	Massasauga Provincial Park		45.226°N 80.056°W

== Rainy River District ==
Name	Established	Coordinates
Agassiz Peatlands Provincial Park	1985	48.8689°N 94.51808°W
Caliper Lake Provincial Park	1960	49.061°N 93.913°W
Cranberry Lake Provincial Nature Reserve	1985	48.86045°N 94.35803°W
Goose Island Provincial Park	2008	48.665733°N 93.164577°W
Quetico Provincial Park	1913	48.3964°N 91.5353°W
Sable Islands Nature Reserve	1985	48.91491°N 94.63967°W
Sandpoint Island Provincial Park	1985	48.638333333333°N 93.108888888889°W
Spruce Islands Provincial Park	1985	48.79572°N 94.27228°W

== Sudbury District ==
Name	Established	Commons category	Image	Coordinates
Biscotasi Lake Provincial Park	1989			47.365277777778°N 82.075°W
Chapleau-Nemegosenda River Provincial Park	1973			48.278055555556°N 83.161111111111°W
Chiniguchi River Waterway Provincial Park	2006	Chiniguchi Waterway Provincial Park		46.822369°N 80.501442°W
Chutes Provincial Park	1970	Chutes Provincial Park		46.2219°N 82.0719°W
Five Mile Lake Provincial Park	1958			47.573611111111°N 83.23°W
Grassy River-Mond Lake Lowlands and Ferris Lake Uplands Provincial Park	2005			47.823055555556°N 81.163611111111°W
Halfway Lake Provincial Park	1985	Halfway Lake Provincial Park		46.9108°N 81.6531°W
Ivanhoe Lake Provincial Park	1957			48.1492°N 82.5119°W
Killarney Lakelands and Headwaters Provincial Park	2006			46.236944444444°N 81.402222222222°W
Killarney Provincial Park	1964	Killarney Provincial Park		46.0833°N 81.3333°W
La Cloche Provincial Park	1985			46.110277777778°N 82.030277777778°W
La Motte Lake Provincial Park	1989			47.736111111111°N 81.653333333333°W
MacMurchy Township End Moraine Provincial Park	2002			47.601144°N 81.137036°W
Mashkinonje Provincial Park	1963			46.256111111111°N 80.329444444444°W
Missinaibi Provincial Park	1970			48.354166°N 83.67°W
Mississagi River Provincial Park	1974			47.1506°N 82.5239°W
Obabika River Provincial Park	1989			47.216111111111°N 80.281666666667°W
Rushbrook Provincial Park	2006			46.72978°N 81.944392°W
Solace Provincial Park	1989			47.188888888889°N 80.690277777778°W
Spanish River Provincial Park	2001			46.875555555556°N 81.774166666667°W
Sturgeon River Provincial Park	1989			47.1°N 80.6667°W
The Shoals Provincial Park	1970			47.835277777778°N 83.850277777778°W
Wakami Lake Provincial Park	1973			47.488888888889°N 82.832777777778°W
Wanapitei Provincial Park	1985			46.805833333333°N 80.710833333333°W
Wenebegon River Provincial Park	2003			47.288772°N 83.036294°W
Windy Lake Provincial Park	1959			46.619166666667°N 81.447777777778°W
Woman River Forest Provincial Park	2003			47.474042°N 82.685256°W

== Thunder Bay District ==
Name	Established	Commons category	Image	Coordinates
Albert Lake Mesa Provincial Nature Reserve	1985			49.0919444°N 88.9788889°W
Arrow Lake Provincial Park	1957			48.178333333333°N 90.225555555556°W
Arrowhead Peninsula Provincial Nature Reserve	1985			48.2538889°N 90.6686111°W
Black Sturgeon River Provincial Park	2002			49.166666666667°N 88.625°W
Brightsand River Provincial Park	1989			49.805277777778°N 90.282777777778°W
Castle Creek Provincial Nature Reserve	1985			48.1947222°N 90.0616666°W
Cavern Lake Provincial Nature Reserve	1975			48.8411111°N 88.6847222°W
Craig's Pit Provincial Nature Reserve	1985			48.6886111°N 86.3391667°W
Devon Road Mesa Provincial Nature Reserve	1985			48.0497222°N 89.6686111°W
Divide Ridge Provincial Nature Reserve	1985			48.263009°N 89.976987°W
Edward Island Provincial Nature Reserve	1985			48.3808333°N 88.635°W
Fraleigh Lake Provincial Nature Reserve	1985			48.1983333°N 89.8502778°W
Gravel River Provincial Nature Reserve	1985			48.92143°N 87.75873°W
Gull River Provincial Park	2003			49.694718°N 89.441992°W
Kabitotikwia River Provincial Nature Reserve	1985			49.6980556°N 89.0719444°W
Kaiashk Provincial Nature Reserve	1989			49.546658°N 89.430504°W
Kakabeka Falls Provincial Park	1957	Kakabeka Falls Provincial Park		48.398611111111°N 89.626666666667°W
Kama Hills Provincial Nature Reserve	1985			49.01212°N 88.00619°W
Kashabowie Provincial Park	1985			48.691111111111°N 90.347222222222°W
Kopka River Provincial Park	1989			50.166666666667°N 89.499166666667°W
La Verendrye Provincial Park	1989			48.1042°N 90.3672°W
Lake Nipigon Provincial Park	1960			49.4833°N 88.1333°W
Le Pate Provincial Nature Reserve				48.23261°N 89.15721°W
Little Greenwater Lake Provincial Nature Reserve	1985			48.5486111°N 90.4377778°W
Livingstone Point Provincial Nature Reserve	1985			49.911666666667°N 88.129444444444°W
MacLeod Provincial Park	1963			49.689444444444°N 86.898611111111°W
Matawin River Provincial Nature Reserve	1985			48.389166666667°N 90.169722222222°W
Michipicoten Island Provincial Park	1985			47.751111194444°N 85.776666611111°W
Nakina Moraine Provincial Park	1994			50.116666666667°N 86.7°W
Neys Provincial Park	1965	Neys Provincial Park		48.75°N 86.5833°W
Obonga-Ottertooth Provincial Park	2003			49.883956°N 89.631705°W
Ogoki River Provincial Park	2004			50.826682°N 87.232234°W
Ouimet Canyon Provincial Park	1972	Ouimet Canyon Provincial Park		48.788888888889°N 88.669443888889°W
Pan Lake Fen Provincial Park	2000			48.834152°N 85.978901°W
Pantagruel Creek Provincial Nature Reserve	1989			49.754444444444°N 89.554444444444°W
Pigeon River Provincial Park	1960			48.0166°N 89.58704°W
Porphyry Island Provincial Park	1968			48.3511°N 88.6353°W
Prairie River Mouth Provincial Nature Reserve	1985			48.788888888889°N 86.786666666667°W
Puff Island Provincial Nature Reserve	1985			48.6618°N 88.04322°W
Pukaskwa River Provincial Park	2002			48.274959°N 85.39884°W
Rainbow Falls Provincial Park	1963			48.8422°N 87.3953°W
Red Sucker Point Provincial Nature Reserve	1985			48.77044°N 86.4705°W
Ruby Lake Provincial Park	2002			48.989444444444°N 88.177777777778°W
Schreiber Channel Provincial Nature Reserve	1979			48.79932°N 87.34681°W
Sedgman Lake Provincial Park	1985			50.636°N 87.697°W
Shesheeb Bay Provincial Nature Reserve	1985			48.5936111°N 88.2719445°W
Silver Falls Provincial Park	1985			48.687777777778°N 89.613333333333°W
Slate Islands Provincial Park	1985			48.658888888889°N 87.003333333333°W
Sleeping Giant Provincial Park	1944	Sleeping Giant Provincial Park		48.3372°N 88.9044°W
St. Raphael Provincial Park	2003			50.7671°N 90.901667°W
Steel River Provincial Park	1989			49.329722222222°N 86.714722222222°W
Thompson Island Provincial Nature Reserve	1985			48.16291°N 89.17322°W
Wabakimi Provincial Park	1983			50.76°N 89.5408°W
West Bay Provincial Nature Reserve	1985			49.90872°N 88.93005°W
White Lake Peatlands Provincial Nature Reserve	1997			48.864701°N 85.559864°W
White Lake Provincial Park	1963			48.7194°N 85.6444°W
Whitesand Provincial Park	2003			50.455535°N 88.686939°W
Windigo Bay Provincial Nature Reserve	1989			50.239722222222°N 88.812777777778°W

== Timiskaming District ==
Name	Established	Coordinates
Englehart River Fine Sand Plain and Waterway Provincial Park	2002	47.878333333333°N 80.208888888889°W
Gem Lake Maple Bedrock Provincial Park	2002	48.163333333333°N 79.666111111111°W
Kap-Kig-Iwan Provincial Park	1957	47.79611111°N 79.88694444°W
Lady Evelyn-Smoothwater Provincial Park	1973	47.2333°N 80.2667°W
Larder River Waterway Provincial Park	1985	47.9725°N 79.626944444444°W
Makobe-Grays River Provincial Park	1985	47.626111111111°N 80.393888888889°W
W.J.B. Greenwood Provincial Park	1985	47.3081°N 79.8131°W
West Montreal River Provincial Park	2002	48.0325°N 80.687222222222°W
