= List of protected areas of Ontario =

This is a list of protected areas of Ontario, Canada, that are administered by Government of Ontario. Ontario Parks and the Ministry of the Environment, Conservation and Parks are the provincial bodies responsible for managing these protected areas.

Ontario Parks and protected areas statistics
Type	Number	Area		% land area
Type	Number	Hectares	Acres	% land area
Provincial parks	341	8,278,063	20,455,540	7.69%
Conservation reserves	295	1,514,147	3,741,540	1.4%
Protected areas	9	1,226,016	3,029,550	1.1%
Wilderness areas	28	2,590	6,400	<0.1%
Total	662	11,020,284	27,231,710	10.29%

== Creation ==
Provincial Parks are authorized under the Provincial Parks Act, a Revised Statutes of Ontario created in 1913 and excluded their lands from agriculture or settlement and the park it self is created under unconsolidated Regulations.

== Types ==
There are four main types of protected areas in Ontario:

- Provincial parks: Areas containing significant natural and cultural features, and provide opportunities for outdoor recreation, scientific research and environmental monitoring, and education. Provincial parks are further subdivided into six classes:
  - Cultural Heritage Class Parks: Parks to protect cultural heritage elements that are distinct in Ontario for intrinsic value, interpretation, education and research purposes.
  - Natural Environment Class Parks: Parks to protect provincially significant recreational landscapes and representative ecosystems, as well as to provide recreational and educational experiences.
  - Nature Reserve Class Parks: Parks to protect notable and provincially significant natural habitats, landforms and ecosystems for intrinsic value, scientific research and biodiversity purposes.
  - Recreation Class Parks: Parks to provide a variety of outdoor recreation opportunities in natural surroundings.
  - Waterway Class Parks: Parks to protect recreational water routes and provincially significant terrestrial and aquatic ecosystems to provide recreational and educational experiences.
  - Wilderness Class Parks: Parks to protect large areas for nature, and provide low-impact recreation. Visitors must travel through these parks by foot only.
- Conservation reserves: Areas containing significant natural and cultural features, and provide opportunities compatible traditional activities such as fishing, hunting, and trapping. Scientific research and environmental monitoring also occurs.
- Wilderness areas: Areas preserved to maintain their natural state, and protect flora and fauna. Research and educational activities can occur.
- Dedicated protected areas: Areas identified by First Nations and the Government of Ontario through community-based land use planning in the Far North area of the province. These areas protect the unique ecology and boreal environment of the region, and allow development of resources.

== Lists of parks and protected areas ==
=== Provincial parks ===
Name	Class	Area	Est'd
Aaron	Recreation	117 ha (290 acres)	1958
Abitibi-de-Troyes	Waterway	4,340 ha (10,700 acres)	1985
Adam Creek	Nature Reserve	50 ha (120 acres)	1985
Agassiz Peatlands	Nature Reserve	5,415 ha (13,380 acres)	1985
Albany River	Waterway	95,100 ha (235,000 acres)	1989
Albert Lake Mesa	Nature Reserve	130 ha (320 acres)	1985
Alexander Lake Forest	Natural Environment	1,934 ha (4,780 acres)	2003
Alexander Stewart	Nature Reserve	30 ha (74 acres)	2003
Algoma Headwaters	Natural Environment	42,745 ha (105,630 acres)	2003
Algonquin	Natural Environment	772,300 ha (1,908,000 acres)	1893
Amable du Fond River	Waterway	731 ha (1,810 acres)	2003
Arrow Lake	Recreation	386 ha (950 acres)	1957
Arrowhead	Natural Environment	1,237 ha (3,060 acres)	1971
Arrowhead Peninsula	Nature Reserve	815 ha (2,010 acres)	1985
Aubinadong River	Waterway	2,722 ha (6,730 acres)	2002
Aubinadong–Nushatogaini Rivers	Waterway	4,928 ha (12,180 acres)	2003
Aubrey Falls	Natural Environment	4,860 ha (12,000 acres)	1985
Awenda	Natural Environment	2,915 ha (7,200 acres)	1975
Balsam Lake	Recreation	449 ha (1,110 acres)	1968
Barron River	Waterway	539 ha (1,330 acres)	2006
Bass Lake	Recreation	65 ha (160 acres)	1957
Batchawana Bay	Recreation	169 ha (420 acres)	1973
Batchawana River	Waterway	2,684 ha (6,630 acres)	2004
Bayview Escarpment	Nature Reserve	439 ha (1,080 acres)	1985
Beattie Pinery	Nature Reserve	68 ha (170 acres)	1997
Bell Bay	Natural Environment	558 ha (1,380 acres)	1989
Big East River	Waterway	1,050 ha (2,600 acres)	2000
Bigwind Lake	Natural Environment	1,967 ha (4,860 acres)	1985
Biscotasi Lake	Natural Environment	12,283 ha (30,350 acres)	2001
Bissett Creek	Waterway	1,676 ha (4,140 acres)	2006
Black Creek	Natural Environment	335 ha (830 acres)	1989
Black Sturgeon River	Waterway	23,531 ha (58,150 acres)	2002
Blind River	Waterway	5,402 ha (13,350 acres)	2002
Blue Jay Creek	Natural Environment	246 ha (610 acres)	1997
Blue Lake	Recreation	2,314 ha (5,720 acres)	1960
Bon Echo	Natural Environment	8,294 ha (20,490 acres)	1965
Bonheur River Kame	Nature Reserve	800 ha (2,000 acres)	1985
Bonnechere	Recreation	162 ha (400 acres)	1967
Bonnechere River	Waterway	1,217 ha (3,010 acres)	1989
Boyne Valley	Natural Environment	431 ha (1,070 acres)	1985
Brightsand River	Waterway	41,250 ha (101,900 acres)	1989
Bronte Creek	Recreation	682 ha (1,690 acres)	1975
Burnt Lands	Nature Reserve	516 ha (1,280 acres)	2003
Butler Lake	Nature Reserve	3,400 ha (8,400 acres)	1985
Cabot Head	Nature Reserve	4,514 ha (11,150 acres)	1985
Caliper Lake	Recreation	147 ha (360 acres)	1960
Carson Lake	Recreation	12 ha (30 acres)	1971
Castle Creek	Nature Reserve	1,075 ha (2,660 acres)	1985
Cavern Lake	Nature Reserve	189 ha (470 acres)	1975
Centennial Lake	Nature Reserve	530 ha (1,300 acres)	1989
Chapleau-Nemegosenda River	Waterway	17,732 ha (43,820 acres)	1973
Charleston Lake	Natural Environment	2,596 ha (6,410 acres)	1976
Chiniguchi Waterway	Waterway	9,368 ha (23,150 acres)	2006
Chutes	Recreation	108 ha (270 acres)	1970
Clear Creek Forest	Nature Reserve	402 ha (990 acres)	2014
Coral Rapids	Nature Reserve	12 ha (30 acres)	1985
Craigleith	Recreation	66 ha (160 acres)	1967
Craig's Pit	Nature Reserve	530 ha (1,300 acres)	1985
Cranberry Lake	Nature Reserve	2,800 ha (6,900 acres)	1985
Daisy Lake Uplands	Nature Reserve	600 ha (1,500 acres)	2006
Dana-Jowsey Lakes	Recreation	2,538 ha (6,270 acres)	1989
Darlington	Recreation	209 ha (520 acres)	1957
Devil's Glen	Recreation	60 ha (150 acres)	1965
Devon Road Mesa	Nature Reserve	60 ha (150 acres)	1985
Divide Ridge	Nature Reserve	542 ha (1,340 acres)	1985
Dividing Lake	Nature Reserve	469 ha (1,160 acres)	1985
Driftwood	Recreation	422 ha (1,040 acres)	1963
Duclos Point	Nature Reserve	111 ha (270 acres)	1985
Duncan Escarpment	Nature Reserve	161 ha (400 acres)	1985
Dupont	Nature Reserve	614 ha (1,520 acres)	2011
Eagle-Dogtooth	Waterway	41,128 ha (101,630 acres)	2003
Earl Rowe	Recreation	312 ha (770 acres)	1964
East English River	Waterway	17,513 ha (43,280 acres)	2003
East Sister Island	Nature Reserve	53 ha (130 acres)	1976
Edward Island	Nature Reserve	600 ha (1,500 acres)	1985
Egan Chutes	Nature Reserve	1,106 ha (2,730 acres)	1989
Emily	Recreation	83 ha (210 acres)	1957
Englehart River Fine Sand Plain and Waterway	Waterway	4,041 ha (9,990 acres)	2002
Esker Lakes	Natural Environment	6,516 ha (16,100 acres)	1957
Fairbank	Recreation	105 ha (260 acres)	1957
Fawn River	Waterway	12,134 ha (29,980 acres)	1989
Ferris	Recreation	198 ha (490 acres)	1962
Finlayson Point	Recreation	47 ha (120 acres)	1963
Fish Point	Nature Reserve	110 ha (270 acres)	1985
Fitzroy	Recreation	198 ha (490 acres)	1963
Five Mile Lake	Recreation	457 ha (1,130 acres)	1958
Forks of the Credit	Natural Environment	282 ha (700 acres)	1985
Foy	Recreation	147 ha (360 acres)	1985
Fraleigh Lake	Nature Reserve	825 ha (2,040 acres)	1985
Frederick House Lake	Nature Reserve	13 ha (32 acres)	1985
French River	Waterway	73,530 ha (181,700 acres)	1989
Frontenac	Natural Environment	5,214 ha (12,880 acres)	1974
Fushimi Lake	Recreation	5,294 ha (13,080 acres)	1979
Gem Lake Maple Bedrock	Nature Reserve	90 ha (220 acres)	2002
Gibson River	Nature Reserve	333 ha (820 acres)	1968
Goose Island	Nature Reserve	72 ha (180 acres)	2008
Goulais River	Waterway	5,084 ha (12,560 acres)	2003
Grant’s Creek	Waterway	1,444 ha (3,570 acres)	2006
Grassy River-Mond Lake Lowlands and Ferris Lake Uplands	Nature Reserve	2,602 ha (6,430 acres)	2005
Gravel River	Nature Reserve	763 ha (1,890 acres)	1985
Greenwater	Natural Environment	8,504 ha (21,010 acres)	1957
Groundhog River Waterway	Waterway	11,036 ha (27,270 acres)	2006
Grundy Lake	Natural Environment	3,614 ha (8,930 acres)	1959
Gull River	Waterway	7,194 ha (17,780 acres)	2003
Halfway Lake	Natural Environment	5,412 ha (13,370 acres)	1985
Hardy Lake	Natural Environment	808 ha (2,000 acres)	1985
Hicks-Oke Bog	Nature Reserve	5,880 ha (14,500 acres)	1994
Hockley Valley	Nature Reserve	377 ha (930 acres)	1989
Holland Landing Prairie	Nature Reserve	34 ha (84 acres)	1994
Hope Bay Forest	Nature Reserve	353 ha (870 acres)	1985
Indian Point	Natural Environment	947 ha (2,340 acres)	1989
Inverhuron	Cultural Heritage	288 ha (710 acres)	1967
Ira Lake	Nature Reserve	30 ha (74 acres)	1989
Ivanhoe Lake	Natural Environment	7,705 ha (19,040 acres)	1957
J. Albert Bauer	Natural Environment	164 ha (410 acres)	1985
James N. Allan	Recreation	117 ha (290 acres)	1989
Jocko Rivers	Waterway	11,299 ha (27,920 acres)	2003
John E. Pearce	Nature Reserve	68 ha (170 acres)	1957
Johnston Harbour-Pine Tree Point	Nature Reserve	929 ha (2,300 acres)	1989
Kabitotikwia River	Nature Reserve	1,965 ha (4,860 acres)	1985
Kaiashk	Nature Reserve	780 ha (1,900 acres)	1989
Kakabeka Falls	Natural Environment	500 ha (1,200 acres)	1967
Kama Hills	Nature Reserve	1 ha (2.5 acres)	1985
Kap-Kig-Iwan	Natural Environment	461 ha (1,140 acres)	1957
Kashabowie	Natural Environment	2,055 ha (5,080 acres)	1985
Kawartha Highlands	Natural Environment	37,587 ha (92,880 acres)	1989
Kenny Forest	Natural Environment	2,200 ha (5,400 acres)	1994
Kesagami	Wilderness	55,977 ha (138,320 acres)	1983
Kettle Lakes	Recreation	1,261 ha (3,120 acres)	1957
Killarney	Wilderness	49,325 ha (121,880 acres)	1964
Killarney Lakelands and Headwaters	Natural Environment	15,346 ha (37,920 acres)	2006
Killbear	Natural Environment	1,760 ha (4,300 acres)	1960
Komoka	Recreation	198 ha (490 acres)	1989
Kopka River	Waterway	31,205 ha (77,110 acres)	1989
La Cloche	Natural Environment	7,448 ha (18,400 acres)	1985
La Motte Lake	Recreation	575 ha (1,420 acres)	1989
La Verendrye	Waterway	18,280 ha (45,200 acres)	1989
Lady Evelyn-Smoothwater	Wilderness	72,400 ha (179,000 acres)	1973
Lake Abitibi Islands	Nature Reserve	2,721 ha (6,720 acres)	2005
Lake Nipigon	Natural Environment	918 ha (2,270 acres)	1960
Lake of the Woods	Natural Environment	20,675 ha (51,090 acres)	1967
Lake on the Mountain	Recreation	104 ha (260 acres)	1957
Lake St. Peter	Recreation	478 ha (1,180 acres)	1971
Lake Superior	Natural Environment	160,810 ha (397,400 acres)	1944
Larder River Waterway	Waterway	4,044 ha (9,990 acres)	1985
Lighthouse Point	Nature Reserve	96 ha (240 acres)	1985
Limestone Islands	Nature Reserve	450 ha (1,100 acres)	1980
Lion's Head	Nature Reserve	526 ha (1,300 acres)	1985
Little Abitibi	Natural Environment	20,733 ha (51,230 acres)	1985
Little Cove	Nature Reserve	16 ha (40 acres)	1985
Little Current River	Waterway	9,930 ha (24,500 acres)	1989
Little Greenwater Lake	Nature Reserve	244 ha (600 acres)	1985
Little White River	Waterway	12,782 ha (31,590 acres)	2002
Livingstone Point	Nature Reserve	1,800 ha (4,400 acres)	1985
Lola Lake	Nature Reserve	6,572 ha (16,240 acres)	1985
Long Point	Recreation	150 ha (370 acres)	1921
Lower Madawaska River	Waterway	1,200 ha (3,000 acres)	1989
MacGregor Point	Natural Environment	1,204 ha (2,980 acres)	1975
MacLeod	Recreation	74 ha (180 acres)	1963
MacMurchy Township End Moraine	Nature Reserve	239 ha (590 acres)	2002
Magnetawan River	Waterway	3,424 ha (8,460 acres)	2003
Makobe-Grays River	Waterway	1,427 ha (3,530 acres)	1985
Manitou Islands	Nature Reserve	1,926 ha (4,760 acres)	1989
Mara	Recreation	450 ha (1,100 acres)	1970
Mark S. Burnham	Recreation	39 ha (96 acres)	1955
Marten River	Recreation	400 ha (990 acres)	1960
Mashkinonje	Natural Environment	2,109 ha (5,210 acres)	1963
Matawatchan	Nature Reserve	65 ha (160 acres)	1968
Matawin River	Nature Reserve	2,615 ha (6,460 acres)	1985
Matinenda	Natural Environment	28,758 ha (71,060 acres)	2003
Mattagami River Beach & Aeolian Deposit	Nature Reserve	164 ha (410 acres)	2003
Mattawa River	Waterway	14,142 ha (34,950 acres)	1970
Maynard Lake	Nature Reserve	30 ha (74 acres)	1997
McRae Point	Recreation	138 ha (340 acres)	1971
Menzel Centennial	Nature Reserve	914 ha (2,260 acres)	1997
Michipicoten	Cultural Heritage	289 ha (710 acres)	1982
Michipicoten Island	Natural Environment	36,740 ha (90,800 acres)	1985
Mikisew	Recreation	131 ha (320 acres)	1964
Minnitaki Kames	Nature Reserve	4,422 ha (10,930 acres)	1989
Misery Bay	Nature Reserve	1,076 ha (2,660 acres)	1989
Missinaibi	Waterway	116,110 ha (286,900 acres)	1970
Mississagi	Natural Environment	8,328 ha (20,580 acres)	1973
Mississagi Delta	Nature Reserve	2,395 ha (5,920 acres)	1985
Mississagi River	Waterway	91,247 ha (225,480 acres)	1974
Mono Cliffs	Natural Environment	732 ha (1,810 acres)	1985
Montreal River	Nature Reserve	44 ha (110 acres)	1968
Morris Tract	Nature Reserve	59 ha (150 acres)	1997
Murphys Point	Natural Environment	1,239 ha (3,060 acres)	1967
Nagagami Lake	Nature Reserve	1,650 ha (4,100 acres)	1985
Nagagamisis	Natural Environment	40,683 ha (100,530 acres)	1957
Nakina Moraine	Natural Environment	5,319 ha (13,140 acres)	1994
Neys	Natural Environment	5,475 ha (13,530 acres)	1965
Nimoosh	Waterway	3,550 ha (8,800 acres)	2002
Noganosh Lake	Waterway	3,082 ha (7,620 acres)	2003
Noisy River	Nature Reserve	378 ha (930 acres)	1989
North Beach	Recreation	94 ha (230 acres)	1970
North Channel Inshore	Waterway	3,762 ha (9,300 acres)	2002
North Driftwood River	Nature Reserve	3 ha (7.4 acres)	1985
Nottawasaga Lookout	Nature Reserve	130 ha (320 acres)	1994
O'Donnell Point	Nature Reserve	875 ha (2,160 acres)	1985
Oastler Lake	Recreation	32 ha (79 acres)	1967
Obabika River	Waterway	20,520 ha (50,700 acres)	1989
Obatanga	Natural Environment	9,409 ha (23,250 acres)	1967
Obonga-Ottertooth	Waterway	21,157 ha (52,280 acres)	2003
Ogoki River	Waterway	23,250 ha (57,500 acres)	2004
Ojibway	Natural Environment	2,631 ha (6,500 acres)	1963
Ojibway Prairie	Nature Reserve	64 ha (160 acres)	1977
Opasquia	Wilderness	473,000 ha (1,170,000 acres)	1983
Opeongo River	Waterway	955 ha (2,360 acres)	1985
Otoskwin-Attawapiskat River	Waterway	82,529 ha (203,930 acres)	1989
Ottawa River	Waterway	125 ha (310 acres)	1989
Ouimet Canyon	Nature Reserve	777 ha (1,920 acres)	1972
Oxtongue River-Ragged Falls	Waterway	507 ha (1,250 acres)	1985
Pakwash	Natural Environment	3,993 ha (9,870 acres)	1967
Pan Lake Fen	Nature Reserve	496 ha (1,230 acres)	2000
Pancake Bay	Recreation	1,659 ha (4,100 acres)	1968
Pantagruel Creek	Nature Reserve	2,685 ha (6,630 acres)	1989
Petawawa Terrace	Nature Reserve	200 ha (490 acres)	2006
Peter's Woods	Nature Reserve	349 ha (860 acres)	1976
Petroglyphs	Cultural Heritage	1,643 ha (4,060 acres)	1976
Pichogen River Mixed Forest	Nature Reserve	3,043 ha (7,520 acres)	2003
Pigeon River	Natural Environment	949 ha (2,350 acres)	1960
Pipestone River	Waterway	97,375 ha (240,620 acres)	1989
Point Farms	Recreation	308 ha (760 acres)	1970
Pokei Lake-White River Wetlands	Nature Reserve	1,768 ha (4,370 acres)	2000
Polar Bear	Wilderness	2,355,200 ha (5,820,000 acres)	1970
Porphyry Island	Nature Reserve	107 ha (260 acres)	1968
Port Bruce	Recreation	7 ha (17 acres)	1974
Port Burwell	Recreation	231 ha (570 acres)	1971
Potholes	Nature Reserve	247 ha (610 acres)	1985
Prairie River Mouth	Nature Reserve	380 ha (940 acres)	1985
Presqu'ile	Natural Environment	982 ha (2,430 acres)	1922
Pretty River Valley	Natural Environment	808 ha (2,000 acres)	1985
Puff Island	Nature Reserve	9 ha (22 acres)	1985
Pukaskwa River	Waterway	1,465 ha (3,620 acres)	2002
Pushkin Hills	Nature Reserve	5 ha (12 acres)	1985
Puzzle Lake	Natural Environment	3,724 ha (9,200 acres)	2001
Quackenbush	Cultural Heritage	40 ha (99 acres)	1985
Queen Elizabeth II Wildlands	Natural Environment	35,505 ha (87,730 acres)	2002
Quetico	Wilderness	471,942 ha (1,166,190 acres)	1913
Rainbow Falls	Recreation	576 ha (1,420 acres)	1963
Red Sucker Point	Nature Reserve	360 ha (890 acres)	1985
René Brunelle	Recreation	3,015 ha (7,450 acres)	1957
Restoule	Natural Environment	2,619 ha (6,470 acres)	1963
Rideau River	Recreation	98 ha (240 acres)	1963
River Aux Sables	Waterway	3,423 ha (8,460 acres)	2006
Rock Point	Recreation	187 ha (460 acres)	1957
Rondeau	Natural Environment	3,254 ha (8,040 acres)	1894
Round Lake	Nature Reserve	2,585 ha (6,390 acres)	1989
Ruby Lake	Natural Environment	2,734 ha (6,760 acres)	2002
Rushbrook	Natural Environment	2,159 ha (5,340 acres)	2006
Rushing River	Recreation	340 ha (840 acres)	1958
Sable Islands	Nature Reserve	2,641 ha (6,530 acres)	1985
Samuel de Champlain	Natural Environment	2,550 ha (6,300 acres)	1967
Sandbanks	Natural Environment	1,551 ha (3,830 acres)	1970
Sandbar Lake	Natural Environment	8,053 ha (19,900 acres)	1970
Sandpoint Island	Natural Environment	914 ha (2,260 acres)	1985
Sandy Islands	Nature Reserve	2,553 ha (6,310 acres)	2001
Sauble Falls	Recreation	20 ha (49 acres)	1971
Schreiber Channel	Nature Reserve	13 ha (32 acres)	1979
Sedgman Lake	Nature Reserve	5,710 ha (14,100 acres)	1985
Selkirk	Recreation	73 ha (180 acres)	1967
Serpent Mounds	Natural Environment	108 ha (270 acres)	1957
Severn River	Waterway	82,960 ha (205,000 acres)	1989
Sextant Rapids	Nature Reserve	4 ha (9.9 acres)	1985
Shallow River	Nature Reserve	2 ha (4.9 acres)	1985
Sharbot Lake	Recreation	80 ha (200 acres)	1958
Shesheeb Bay	Nature Reserve	275 ha (680 acres)	1985
Short Hills	Natural Environment	661 ha (1,630 acres)	1985
Sibbald Point	Recreation	225 ha (560 acres)	1957
Silent Lake	Natural Environment	1,610 ha (4,000 acres)	1977
Silver Falls	Natural Environment	3,260 ha (8,100 acres)	1985
Silver Lake	Recreation	43 ha (110 acres)	1958
Sioux Narrows	Recreation	135 ha (330 acres)	1957
Six Mile Lake	Recreation	212 ha (520 acres)	1958
Slate Islands	Natural Environment	6,570 ha (16,200 acres)	1985
Sleeping Giant	Natural Environment	24,400 ha (60,000 acres)	1944
Smokey Head-White Bluff	Nature Reserve	347 ha (860 acres)	1985
Solace	Waterway	5,943 ha (14,690 acres)	1989
South Bay	Recreation	1,525 ha (3,770 acres)	1985
Spanish River	Waterway	35,386 ha (87,440 acres)	2001
Springwater	Recreation	193 ha (480 acres)	1958
Spruce Islands	Nature Reserve	1,497 ha (3,700 acres)	1985
St. Raphael	Waterway	90,521 ha (223,680 acres)	2003
Steel River	Waterway	11,240 ha (27,800 acres)	1989
Stoco Fen	Nature Reserve	203 ha (500 acres)	1985
Sturgeon Bay	Recreation	14 ha (35 acres)	1960
Sturgeon River	Waterway	7,985 ha (19,730 acres)	1989
Temagami River	Waterway	3,394 ha (8,390 acres)	2000
Thackeray	Nature Reserve	116 ha (290 acres)	1985
The Massasauga	Natural Environment	13,105 ha (32,380 acres)	1989
The Pinery	Natural Environment	2,532 ha (6,260 acres)	1957
The Shoals	Natural Environment	10,644 ha (26,300 acres)	1970
Thompson Island	Nature Reserve	145 ha (360 acres)	1985
Tide Lake	Nature Reserve	54 ha (130 acres)	1997
Tidewater	Natural Environment	980 ha (2,400 acres)	1970
Timber Island	Nature Reserve	44 ha (110 acres)	1985
Trillium Woods	Nature Reserve	10 ha (25 acres)	1969
Trout Lake	Nature Reserve	7,150 ha (17,700 acres)	1989
Turkey Point	Recreation	316 ha (780 acres)	1959
Turtle River-White Otter Lake	Waterway	49,294 ha (121,810 acres)	1989
Upper Madawaska River	Waterway	1,085 ha (2,680 acres)	1989
Uxbridge	Recreation	532 ha (1,310 acres)	2024
Voyageur	Recreation	1,465 ha (3,620 acres)	1966
Wabakimi	Wilderness	892,061 ha (2,204,330 acres)	1983
Wakami Lake	Recreation	12,316 ha (30,430 acres)	1973
Wanapitei	Natural Environment	3,413 ha (8,430 acres)	1985
Wasaga Beach	Recreation	1,844 ha (4,560 acres)	1959
Waubaushene Beaches	Nature Reserve	34 ha (84 acres)	1969
Wenebegon River	Waterway	16,383 ha (40,480 acres)	2003
West Bay	Nature Reserve	1,120 ha (2,800 acres)	1985
West English River	Waterway	22,922 ha (56,640 acres)	2003
West Montreal River	Waterway	7,259 ha (17,940 acres)	2002
West Sandy Island	Nature Reserve	266 ha (660 acres)	1994
Westmeath	Natural Environment	610 ha (1,500 acres)	1985
Wheatley	Recreation	241 ha (600 acres)	1971
White Lake	Natural Environment	4,048 ha (10,000 acres)	1963
White Lake Peatlands	Nature Reserve	992 ha (2,450 acres)	1997
Whitesand	Waterway	11,337 ha (28,010 acres)	2003
Widdifield Forest	Natural Environment	2,170 ha (5,400 acres)	2002
Wildgoose Outwash Deposit	Nature Reserve	1,198 ha (2,960 acres)	2005
Williams Island	Nature Reserve	8 ha (20 acres)	1985
Windigo Bay	Nature Reserve	8,378 ha (20,700 acres)	1989
Windigo Point	Nature Reserve	513 ha (1,270 acres)	1989
Windy Lake	Recreation	118 ha (290 acres)	1959
Winisk River	Waterway	141,100 ha (349,000 acres)	1969
Winnange Lake	Natural Environment	4,745 ha (11,730 acres)	1985
W.J.B. Greenwood	Recreation	465 ha (1,150 acres)	1985
Wolf Island	Natural Environment	222 ha (550 acres)	1985
Woman River Forest Deposit	Natural Environment	6,305 ha (15,580 acres)	2003
Woodland Caribou	Wilderness	470,620 ha (1,162,900 acres)	1983

=== Conservation reserves ===
Name	Area	Est'd
Adair Lake	2,800 ha (6,900 acres)	2003
Ahmic Forest and Rock Barrens	6,081 ha (15,030 acres)	2001
Airport Road	66 ha (160 acres)	2003
Akonesi Chain of Lakes Complex	1,469 ha (3,630 acres)	2003
Alm Lake Forest	752 ha (1,860 acres)	2003
Archambeau Lake Forest	1,234 ha (3,050 acres)	2001
Attlee Central Forest	286 ha (710 acres)	2001
Attlee	263 ha (650 acres)	2001
Attwood River	21,314 ha (52,670 acres)	2004
Aulneau Interior	2,296 ha (5,670 acres)	2003
Axe Lake Wetland	793 ha (1,960 acres)	2002
Ballantyne Lake Drumlins	3,172 ha (7,840 acres)	2005
Basswood Lake	149 ha (370 acres)	2002
Basswood Lake Hemlock	104 ha (260 acres)	2002
Bear Creek	212 ha (520 acres)	2000
Bear Lake Peatland	3,845 ha (9,500 acres)	2000
Bennet Lake Esker Kame Complex	3,485 ha (8,610 acres)	2005
Bickford Oak Woods	314 ha (780 acres)	2008
Big Deer Lake	436 ha (1,080 acres)	2000
Big Sand Lake	284 ha (700 acres)	1994
Big Spring Lake Bedrock	973 ha (2,400 acres)	2001
Black Bay Bog	1,881 ha (4,650 acres)	2002
Blue Lake End Moraine	1,408 ha (3,480 acres)	2002
Bob Lake	2,657 ha (6,570 acres)	2001
Boom Creek	590 ha (1,500 acres)	2003
Boulter-Depot Creek	2,348 ha (5,800 acres)	2003
Brace Creek Outwash Plain	4,705 ha (11,630 acres)	2001
Bray Lake	265 ha (650 acres)	2000
Brennan Harbour	223 ha (550 acres)	2001
Bridge Lake Outwash Plain Forest	149 ha (370 acres)	2001
Brokenmouth River	1,071 ha (2,650 acres)	2004
Brown's Inlet	2,931 ha (7,240 acres)	2003
Bruce Lake	5,462 ha (13,500 acres)	2002
Bryce and Cane Township Wetland Lacustrine	655 ha (1,620 acres)	2001
Byrnes Lake White Birch	1,569 ha (3,880 acres)	2002
Cache Bay Wetland	3,926 ha (9,700 acres)	2002
Callander Bay Wetland	319 ha (790 acres)	2003
Campfire River	4,180 ha (10,300 acres)	2003
Campus Lake	19,452 ha (48,070 acres)	2003
Cardwell Township Old Growth	1,029 ha (2,540 acres)	2002
Cartier Moraine	43 ha (110 acres)	2000
Cedar Creek	279 ha (690 acres)	2001
Centre Creek Old Growth White Pine	163 ha (400 acres)	2000
Chain Lakes	926 ha (2,290 acres)	2001
Cherriman Township	1,003 ha (2,480 acres)	2001
Clay Lake	80 ha (200 acres)	1994
Clear Lake	1,307 ha (3,230 acres)	1997
Cliff Lake	2,947 ha (7,280 acres)	2001
Cognashene Lake	2,945 ha (7,280 acres)	2002
Cognashene Point	42 ha (100 acres)	2001
Commanda Creek	1,657 ha (4,090 acres)	2002
Conroys Marsh	2,049 ha (5,060 acres)	2003
Constant Creek Swamp and Fen	540 ha (1,300 acres)	2003
Coral Rapids Wetland	6,105 ha (15,090 acres)	2005
Crane Lake Forest	387 ha (960 acres)	2003
Crotch Lake	376 ha (930 acres)	2006
Crowe River Swamp	189.8 ha (469 acres)	2000
Dana Township Jack Pine Forest	319 ha (790 acres)	2002
Dog River	2,648 ha (6,540 acres)	2002
Draper Township	81 ha (200 acres)	2002
Driftwood River White Cedar Lacustrine	184 ha (450 acres)	2005
Dryberry Lake	21,850 ha (54,000 acres)	2003
Dub Creek Iceberg Keel Marks	1,136 ha (2,810 acres)	2003
Dunmore Township Balsam Fir Outwash Deposit	203 ha (500 acres)	2001
Dutcher Lake	1,952 ha (4,820 acres)	2001
Eagle Lake Islands	3,395 ha (8,390 acres)	2003
Eagle-Snowshoe	35,621 ha (88,020 acres)	2003
East Bay	1,894 ha (4,680 acres)	2003
East Lady Evelyn Lake	5,612 ha (13,870 acres)	2001
East Larder River Bedrock Conifer	7,003 ha (17,300 acres)	2002
East Wabigoon	1,299 ha (3,210 acres)	2003
East Wenebegon Forest	3,053 ha (7,540 acres)	2003
Eastern Cardwell Forest	627 ha (1,550 acres)	2002
Echo River Hardwoods	10,236 ha (25,290 acres)	2001
Eden Township Forest	145 ha (360 acres)	2002
Elzevir Peatlands	2,246 ha (5,550 acres)	2003
Fallingsnow Lake	854 ha (2,110 acres)	2001
Farrington Township	948 ha (2,340 acres)	2003
Ferguson Township White Pine Forest	364 ha (900 acres)	2000
Ferrie Township Forest	474 ha (1,170 acres)	2000
Field Township	399 ha (990 acres)	2003
Fish Bay	380 ha (940 acres)	2002
Fishnet Lake	3,503 ha (8,660 acres)	2001
Flat Creek Old Pine	436 ha (1,080 acres)	2000
Fraserdale Wetland Complex	18,762 ha (46,360 acres)	2005
Freeman Township Sugar Maple Forest	123 ha (300 acres)	2001
Friday and Scotia Lakes	1,930 ha (4,800 acres)	2002
Galbraith Peatland	121 ha (300 acres)	2002
Garden River Forest	299 ha (740 acres)	2000
Garden-Pakashkan	12,586 ha (31,100 acres)	2004
Garson Forest	204 ha (500 acres)	2002
Geary Township Shoreline Bluff	610 ha (1,500 acres)	2003
Gibson River	172 ha (430 acres)	2003
Glenn N. Crombie	6,952 ha (17,180 acres)	2001
God's Lake Old Growth White Pine Forest	354 ha (870 acres)	2002
Gooderham Old Growth White Pine Forest	82 ha (200 acres)	2000
Gough Outwash Forest	402 ha (990 acres)	2001
Goulais River Beach Ridges	929 ha (2,300 acres)	2003
Grassy River Halliday Lake Forests & Lowlands	1,778 ha (4,390 acres)	2005
Gravel River	46,632 ha (115,230 acres)	2002
Green Lake Old Pine	156 ha (390 acres)	2000
Greenbough Esker	549 ha (1,360 acres)	2006
Greenwood Lake	775 ha (1,920 acres)	1997
Gull-Christina	1,863 ha (4,600 acres)	2004
Gulliver River	2,737 ha (6,760 acres)	2003
Hammell Lake	1,901 ha (4,700 acres)	2002
Harmony Forest	1,012 ha (2,500 acres)	2000
Harth Lake	3,722 ha (9,200 acres)	2003
Hawkins Property	332 ha (820 acres)	2006
Henwood Township Forest and Wetland	322 ha (800 acres)	2001
Hilliardton Marsh	5,502 ha (13,600 acres)	2002
Holdridge Creek	1,372 ha (3,390 acres)	2000
Horseshoe Lake	115 ha (280 acres)	2002
Hungry Lake	3,525 ha (8,710 acres)	2006
Ile Parisienne	4,669 ha (11,540 acres)	2001
Indian Bay South	241.3 ha (596 acres)	1997
Isko Dewabo Lake Complex	2,967 ha (7,330 acres)	2000
Island Lake Forest and Barrens	15,473 ha (38,230 acres)	2000
Ivanhoe River	7,071 ha (17,470 acres)	2003
Jackson Lake	1,166 ha (2,880 acres)	2000
Jevins & Silver Lake	2,144 ha (5,300 acres)	2000
Jim Edwards Lake	8,656 ha (21,390 acres)	2001
Jog Lake	48,482 ha (119,800 acres)	1997
Jollineau	773 ha (1,910 acres)	2000
Joly Township Hardwoods	496 ha (1,230 acres)	2001
Kagianagami Lake	1,247 ha (3,080 acres)	2004
Kahshe Lake Barrens	3,169 ha (7,830 acres)	2006
Kakakiwibik Esker	521 ha (1,290 acres)	2000
Kaladar Jack Pine Barrens	1,086.4 ha (2,685 acres)	1997
Kama Cliffs	3,713 ha (9,180 acres)	2000
Kapesakosi Lake	175 ha (430 acres)	2003
Kawawia Lake Old Growth	82 ha (200 acres)	2000
Kesagami River Outwash Plain	2,251 ha (5,560 acres)	2005
Killala Lake	13,190 ha (32,600 acres)	2005
Kitchener Township (Morton Lake)	556 ha (1,370 acres)	2002
Kwinkwaga Ground Moraine Uplands	12,650 ha (31,300 acres)	2000
La Cloche Ridge	4,004 ha (9,890 acres)	2001
La Verendrye/Ogidaki	1,039 ha (2,570 acres)	2003
Lac des Mille Lacs	2,538 ha (6,270 acres)	2003
Lac Seul Islands	14,723 ha (36,380 acres)	2003
Lake Nipigon	188,136 ha (464,890 acres)	2003
Lake of the Woods	45,960 ha (113,600 acres)	2006
Lake of the Woods Waters	1,984 ha (4,900 acres)	2006
Lake Superior North Shore	1,501 ha (3,710 acres)	2001
Lawrence Lake	1,409 ha (3,480 acres)	2003
Lingham Lake	1,988 ha (4,910 acres)	2003
Little Mississippi River	916 ha (2,260 acres)	2003
Little Spring Lake	106 ha (260 acres)	2000
Long Lake	1,720 ha (4,300 acres)	2004
Longlac North	1,829 ha (4,520 acres)	2004
Loon Lake Wetland	372 ha (920 acres)	2001
Louck Lake Wetland	265 ha (650 acres)	2002
Low/Bell	5,576 ha (13,780 acres)	2004
Lower Moon River	2,723 ha (6,730 acres)	2001
Lower Twin Lake	377 ha (930 acres)	2004
Mac's Bay	290 ha (720 acres)	1997
MacLennan Esker Forest	368 ha (910 acres)	2002
Magpie River Terraces	2,088 ha (5,160 acres)	2002
Mahaffy Township Ground Moraine	640 ha (1,600 acres)	2005
Makobe Grays Ice Margin	903 ha (2,230 acres)	2001
Manitou	7,203 ha (17,800 acres)	2003
Manitou Mountain	62 ha (150 acres)	2006
Masonville Bernhardt Muskeg Maple Moraine	128 ha (320 acres)	2001
Matabitchuan River	87.2 ha (215 acres)	1997
McCrae Lake	2,039 ha (5,040 acres)	2001
McDougal Point Peninsula	6,036 ha (14,920 acres)	2005
McGarry Township Forest	1,434 ha (3,540 acres)	2002
McLaren Forest	409 ha (1,010 acres)	2005
Melgund Lake	1,094 ha (2,700 acres)	2003
Mellon Lake	8,151 ha (20,140 acres)	2001
Meteor Lake Outwash Fans	3,552 ha (8,780 acres)	2002
Miles Bay	43.6 ha (108 acres)	1997
Mistinikon Lake Uplands	4,330 ha (10,700 acres)	2002
Mojikit Lake	62,597 ha (154,680 acres)	2004
Monteith Forest	185 ha (460 acres)	2002
Moon River	455 ha (1,120 acres)	2006
Moreau's Bay	141 ha (350 acres)	2001
Morrison Lake Wetland	77 ha (190 acres)	2002
Mount Moriah	2,319 ha (5,730 acres)	2003
Mowat Township Hemlock Forest	197 ha (490 acres)	2002
Mozhabong Lake	4,354 ha (10,760 acres)	2001
Mud Lake/Creek	158 ha (390 acres)	2003
Mudcat Lake Forest	396 ha (980 acres)	2002
Muldrew Barrens	803 ha (1,980 acres)	2002
Musk Lake	4,854 ha (11,990 acres)	2003
Nahma Bog and Poor Fens	3,606 ha (8,910 acres)	2005
Naiscoot Forest	375 ha (930 acres)	2003
Nakina Northeast Waterway	13,909 ha (34,370 acres)	2004
Narrows Island	41.1 ha (102 acres)	1997
Night Hawk Lake Shoreline Bluffs	893 ha (2,210 acres)	2005
Nipigon Palisades	11,522 ha (28,470 acres)	2003
Nipigon River	2,650 ha (6,500 acres)	2003
North Georgian Bay Shoreline and Islands	17,107 ha (42,270 acres)	2012
North Montreal River Moraine	552 ha (1,360 acres)	2000
North Muskego River Mixed Forest	3,283 ha (8,110 acres)	2005
North of the North French River	158,286 ha (391,130 acres)	2005
North Thornben Lake Moraine	454 ha (1,120 acres)	2003
North Yorston	13,323 ha (32,920 acres)	2004
Northern Claybelt Forest Complex	68,128 ha (168,350 acres)	2005
Northern McConkey	1,249 ha (3,090 acres)	2002
Nova Township Clay Plain Peatlands	3,281 ha (8,110 acres)	2005
O'Connor	895 ha (2,210 acres)	2000
Octopus Creek	608 ha (1,500 acres)	2003
Onaman Lake	4,734 ha (11,700 acres)	2000
Onaping Lake	16,698 ha (41,260 acres)	2002
Ottertail Creek	1,650 ha (4,100 acres)	1997
Ottertooth	28,793 ha (71,150 acres)	2003
Our Colleagues	92 ha (230 acres)	2004
Oxbow Lake Forest	200 ha (490 acres)	2000
Painted Rock	113 ha (280 acres)	1997
Pakeshkag River Forest	1,299 ha (3,210 acres)	2002
Pinard Moraine	18,202 ha (44,980 acres)	2005
Pinetorch Lake	3,623 ha (8,950 acres)	2004
Pipestone	10,855 ha (26,820 acres)	2006
Plastic Lake and Dawson Ponds	291 ha (720 acres)	2000
Point au Baril Forests and Wetlands	2,366 ha (5,850 acres)	2003
Pyatt Lake	405 ha (1,000 acres)	2003
Rabbit Lake West	491.4 ha (1,214 acres)	1997
Raganooter Lake	311 ha (770 acres)	2001
Rainmaker Lake	70 ha (170 acres)	2003
Rainy Lake Islands	5,912 ha (14,610 acres)	2006
Ranger North	7,020 ha (17,300 acres)	1997
Rawhide Lake	4,633 ha (11,450 acres)	2001
Rose Lake Dune Peatland Complex	273 ha (670 acres)	2001
Ryerson Township Forest	353 ha (870 acres)	2002
Sausage Lake Forest	664 ha (1,640 acres)	2000
Scenic Lake	1,890 ha (4,700 acres)	2003
Scotty Lake	775 ha (1,920 acres)	1994
Seahorse Lake	658 ha (1,630 acres)	2000
Searchmont South Forest	626 ha (1,550 acres)	2001
Seguin River Conifer and Fens	6,833 ha (16,880 acres)	2005
Seguin River	275 ha (680 acres)	2002
Severn River	9,929 ha (24,540 acres)	2003
Shack Creek Wetland	288 ha (710 acres)	2001
Shakespeare Forest	215 ha (530 acres)	2006
Shallow River Poplar Outwash	396 ha (980 acres)	2005
Shanly Creek Drumlins	3,734 ha (9,230 acres)	2005
Sharpe Bay Fen	636 ha (1,570 acres)	2000
Shawanaga Lake	4,932 ha (12,190 acres)	2001
Shook Lake	159 ha (390 acres)	1997
Side Lake	92 ha (230 acres)	2003
Sifton Township	706 ha (1,740 acres)	2003
Silver Creek Peatland	281 ha (690 acres)	2003
Slim Jim Lake	6,460 ha (16,000 acres)	2003
Smith Lake	1,649 ha (4,070 acres)	2001
Smoky River Headwaters	928 ha (2,290 acres)	2002
Snake River Marsh	213 ha (530 acres)	2003
Solitary Lake	257 ha (640 acres)	2003
South Grassy Lake Outwash	156 ha (390 acres)	2001
South Greenhill Lake Sand Delta	1,463 ha (3,620 acres)	2005
South Michipicoten River-Superior Shoreline	2,219 ha (5,480 acres)	2005
South River Forest	180 ha (440 acres)	2005
South Timiskaming Shoreline	703 ha (1,740 acres)	2004
Spring/Cut Lake Esker	691 ha (1,710 acres)	2002
St. Williams	1,033 ha (2,550 acres)	2008
Ste. Thrse Ground Moraine	150 ha (370 acres)	2003
Stormy Lake	412 ha (1,020 acres)	2003
Strickland River Mixed Forest Wetland	1,638 ha (4,050 acres)	2000
Stuart Lake Wetland	661 ha (1,630 acres)	2001
Sugar Lake	6,143 ha (15,180 acres)	2001
Swan Lake	256 ha (630 acres)	2002
Tatachikapika River Plain	3,384 ha (8,360 acres)	2005
Temagami Island North	125.6 ha (310 acres)	1997
Tembec Wetland	8,149 ha (20,140 acres)	2005
Thessalon River Delta/Rock Lake Red Oak	295 ha (730 acres)	2001
Three Mile Narrows	840 ha (2,100 acres)	2004
Tikamaganda Lake	2,957 ha (7,310 acres)	1997
Tilley Creek	598 ha (1,480 acres)	2000
Tilton Forest	725 ha (1,790 acres)	2002
Torrance Barrens	1,906 ha (4,710 acres)	1997
Trewartha Creek	9,736 ha (24,060 acres)	2003
Trollope Lake Burnt Hill Poplar Spruce	2,108 ha (5,210 acres)	2005
Trout Lake	60,186 ha (148,720 acres)	2003
Twilight Lake	396 ha (980 acres)	2003
Upper English River	12,295 ha (30,380 acres)	2003
Upper Raft Lake	476 ha (1,180 acres)	2002
Upper Shebeshekong Wetland	5,304 ha (13,110 acres)	2003
Venetian Creek Old Pine	287 ha (710 acres)	2000
Vimy Lake Uplands	3,406 ha (8,420 acres)	2005
Wabos North	956 ha (2,360 acres)	2000
Wabos South	580 ha (1,400 acres)	2000
Wagong Lake Forest	2,381 ha (5,880 acres)	2001
Wahwashkesh-Naiscoot	1,734 ha (4,280 acres)	2003
Wainfleet Bog	234.3 ha (579 acres)	1997
Wapus Creek	2,216 ha (5,480 acres)	2002
West Wabigoon River	714 ha (1,760 acres)	2003
Westmeath Bog	43 ha (110 acres)	2003
White Bear Forest	1,242 ha (3,070 acres)	1997
White Lake	187 ha (460 acres)	2003
Whitefish and East Whitefish Lakes Sandy Till Upland	9,353 ha (23,110 acres)	2005
Whitefish River Sandy Till	3,800 ha (9,400 acres)	2005
Whitemud	18,485 ha (45,680 acres)	2003
Widgeon Lake Moraine	1,240 ha (3,100 acres)	2002
Willow Lake	55 ha (140 acres)	1994
Windermere Goldie Lake Complex	18,699 ha (46,210 acres)	2005

=== Dedicated protected areas ===
Name	Area
Sampson Lake (Pahngwahshahshk)	54,737 ha (135,260 acres)
Lake Country (Weeskayjahk Ohtahzhoganiing)	265,751 ha (656,690 acres)
Pringle Lake (Sahkeesahkahteekoh weesuhkaheegahn)	8,868 ha (21,910 acres)
Valhalla-Trough Lake (Kahnahmaykoosayseekahk)	4,808 ha (11,880 acres)
Peisk Lake (Payshk Ohsahgaheegahn)	3,076 ha (7,600 acres)
Pikangikum Cultural Landscape Waterways	96,085 ha (237,430 acres)
Cat-Slate River System	495,833 ha (1,225,230 acres)
Pauingassi	108,493 ha (268,090 acres)
Little Grand Rapids	188,738 ha (466,380 acres)

=== Wilderness areas ===
Name	Area
Hilton Township	39 ha (97 acres)
New Brunswick House Post	55 ha (137 acres)
Old Brunswick House	21 ha (51 acres)
Abitibi Lake Narrows	4.0 ha (10 acres)
Old Fort Albany	4.5 ha (11 acres)
Sankey Township	29 ha (72 acres)
Kishkebus Lake	134 ha (332 acres)
Turkey Point	21 ha (53 acres)
Cape Henrietta-Maria	91 ha (225 acres)
Derby Lake	180 ha (450 acres)
Echo Township	199 ha (492 acres)
Sutton Lake Gorge	51 ha (125 acres)
White Otter Lake	17 ha (41 acres)
Crater Lakes	220 ha (550 acres)
Mccrae Lake	253 ha (625 acres)
Presqu’ile Islands	130 ha (322 acres)
Blair Township	61 ha (150 acres)
Timber Island	41 ha (101 acres)
Shoal Lake	5.7 ha (14 acres)
Eighteen Mile Island	195 ha (482 acres)
Fairy Point	260 ha (640 acres)
Whitefish Falls	108 ha (266 acres)
Agate Island	60 ha (148 acres)
Bat Cave	72 ha (177 acres)
Ganley Harbour	2.4 ha (6 acres)
Outer Barn Island	65 ha (161 acres)
Sleeping Giant	256 ha (633 acres)
Lac La Croix	12 ha (29 acres)

== See also ==
- List of botanical gardens in Canada
- List of Canadian protected areas
