= Wilderness parks =

Park designation in Ontario, Canada

Wilderness Class Parks is the designation given by the Provincial Parks System of Ontario, Canada, for parks which are large areas left to nature where visitors may travel on foot or by canoe. Offering little if any facilities for visitors, these areas provide the solitude of an undisturbed, natural setting.

== See also ==
- List of Ontario parks
