= Gravel River =

Gravel River may refer to:

- Gravel River (Northwest Territories), also known as Keele River, a tributary of the Mackenzie River
- Gravel River Provincial Park, a nature reserve in the Thunder Bay District of Ontario, Canada
- Gravel River (Quebec), a river in Quebec, Canada, to the north of the lower Saint Lawrence River
- Gravel River (Thunder Bay District), a river in Northern Ontario that empties into Lake Superior

== See also ==
- River gravel
