= Driftwood Provincial Park =

Provincial park in Ontario, Canada

- IUCN category II (national park)
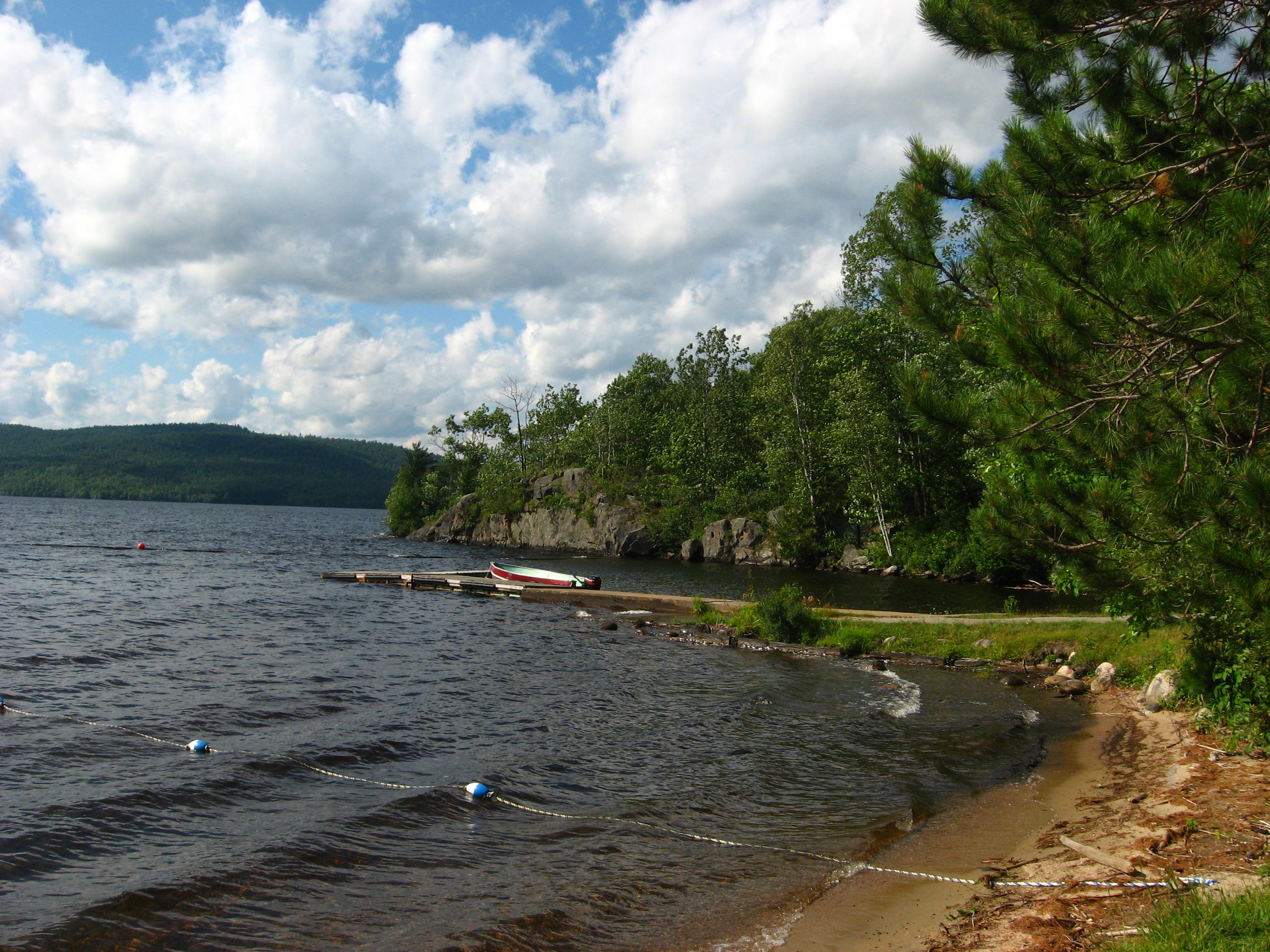
- The day-use beach at Driftwood Provincial Park.

- Location within Southern Ontario
- Interactive map of Driftwood Provincial Park
- Location: Ontario, Canada
- Nearest city: Deep River, Ontario
- Coordinates: 46°11′24″N 77°51′30″W
- Area: 4.22 km^{2} (1.6 sq mi)
- Established: 1963
- Visitors: 17,596 (in 2022)
- Governing body: Ontario Parks
- Website: www.ontarioparks.ca/park/driftwood

Driftwood Provincial Park is a provincial park on the south shore of the Ottawa River, about 40 kilometres (25 mi) west of Deep River, in Ontario, Canada. It is administered by Ontario Parks which classifies it as a "recreation park".

The park is situated on a sheltered bay that was created in 1950 after the construction of the Des Joachims hydro-electric dam 12 km downstream on the Ottawa River. This new bay became a spot where driftwood being carried downstream washes ashore.

This park has 80 campsites, 20 of which have electrical hookups, making it a popular summer destination for campers who can also swim at one of two sandy beaches, canoe in the Ottawa River, or hike on trails that range over eskers and rocky ridges, offering dramatic views of the Laurentian Mountains across the river in Quebec. The park is also a popular fishing destination being right on the Ottawa river, it offers yellow pickerel, northern pike and smallmouth bass. Although the park is gated in the winter, you can enter on foot for hiking, cross-country skiing and snow-shoeing.

== See also ==
- List of Canadian provincial parks - for parks in other Canadian provinces.
- List of Ontario parks
