= Magnetawan River Provincial Park =

Provincial park in Ontario, Canada

- IUCN category II (national park)
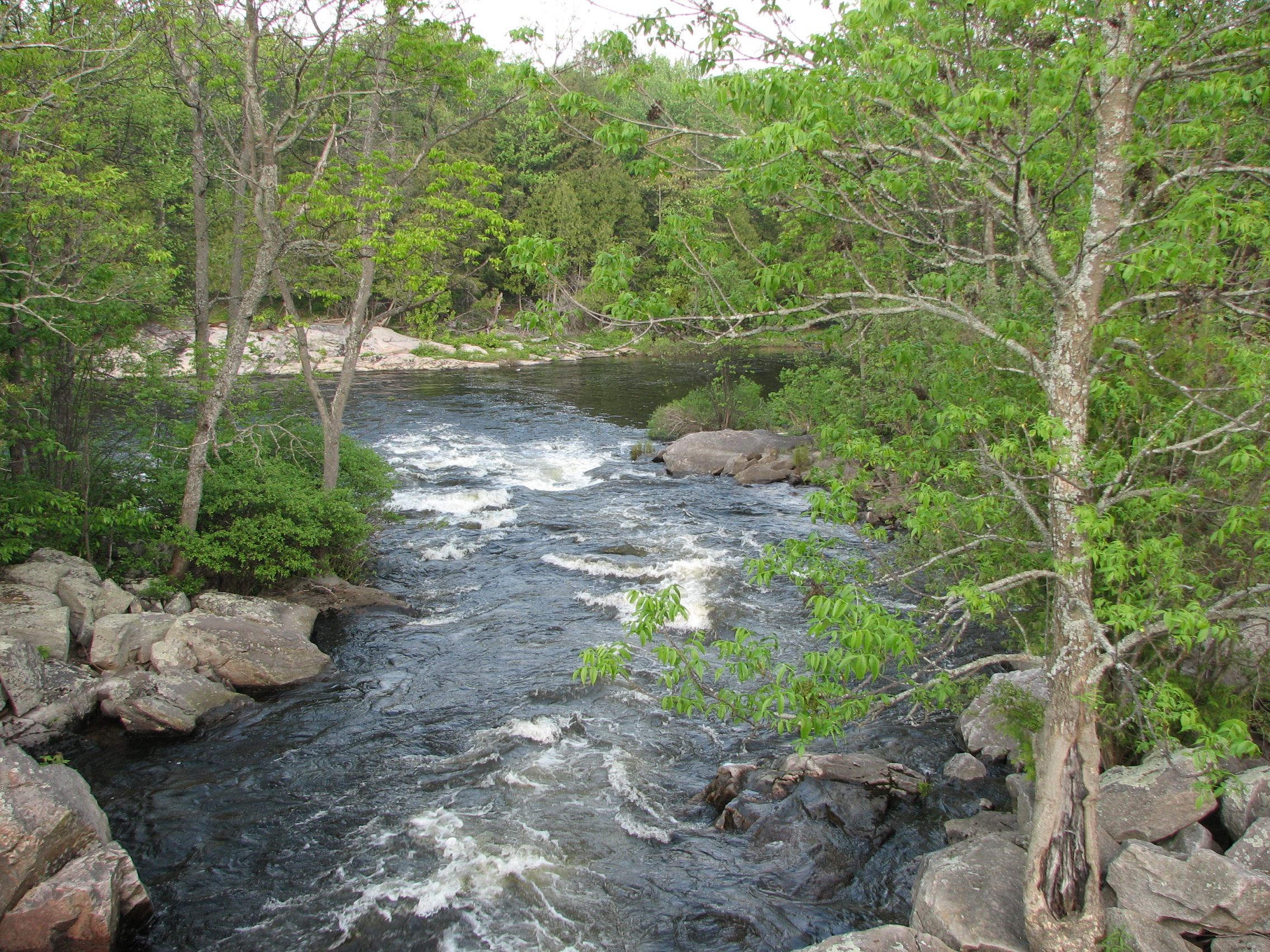
- One of many rapids

- Location within Southern Ontario
- Location: Magnetawan River
- Nearest city: Parry Sound, Ontario
- Coordinates: 45°38′00″N 80°00′00″W
- Area: 36.15 km^{2} (13.96 sq mi)
- Governing body: Ontario Parks

Magnetawan River Provincial Park is a waterway-class provincial park on the Magnetawan River in Parry Sound, Ontario, Canada.

A non-operating park, it offers neither facilities nor services. Its most popular use is for whitewater kayaking and canoeing.

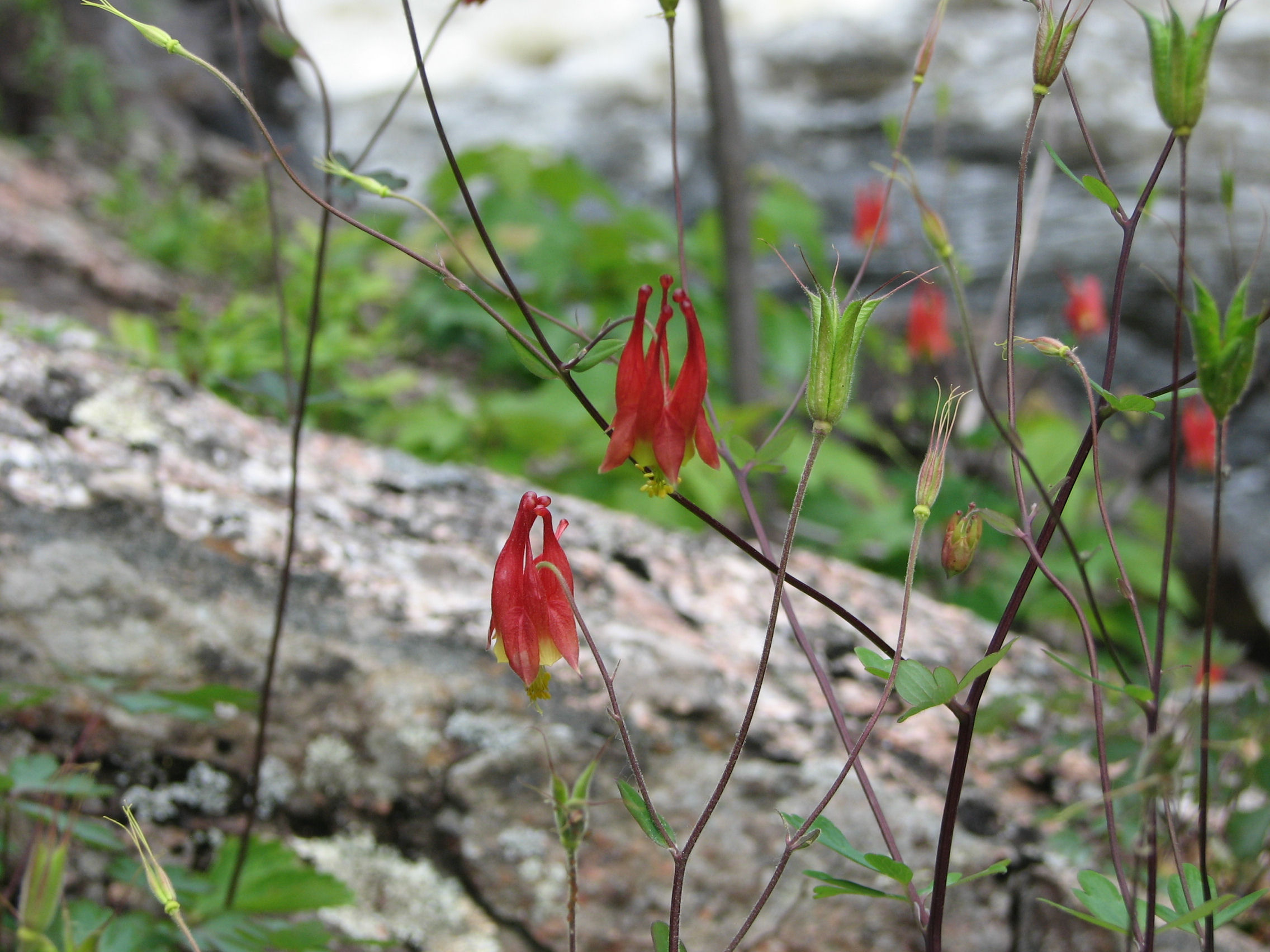
Canadian columbine (Aquilegia canadensis) found along riverbank

== See also ==
- List of Ontario parks
