= Ojibway Provincial Park =

Provincial park in Ontario, Canada

- IUCN category II (national park)
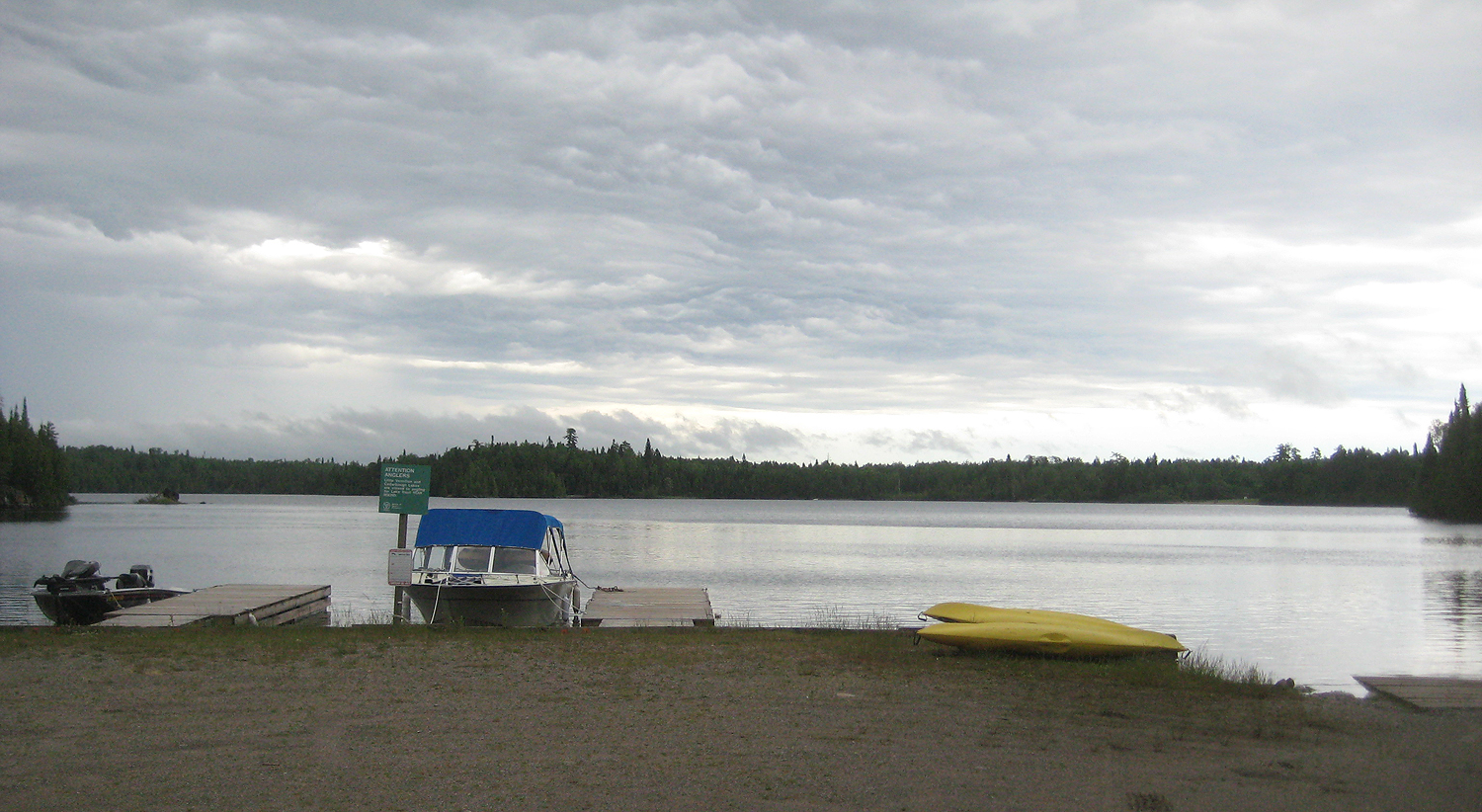
- Boat launch with docks

- Location within Ontario
- Interactive map of Ojibway Provincial Park
- Location: Kenora District, Ontario, Canada
- Nearest city: Dryden, Ontario
- Coordinates: 49°59′42″N 92°7′57″W
- Area: 2,630 ha (6,500 acres)
- Established: 1975
- Visitors: 7,701 (in 2022)
- Governing body: Ontario Parks
- Website: www.ontarioparks.ca/park/ojibway

Ojibway Provincial Park is about 25 kilometres (16 mi) southwest of Sioux Lookout on Highway 72 in Northwestern Ontario, Canada. On Little Vermilion Lake, the park offers swimming, a sandy beach, and muskellunge fishing. It has trails through pine forests and along the lake's shore. The park was formerly operated as a partnership between the Ontario government and a local community organization, Community Living Dryden-Sioux Lookout, but as of 2019 is run entirely by Ontario Parks.

== See also ==
- List of Ontario parks
