= Fushimi Lake Provincial Park =

Park in Ontario, Canada

- IUCN category II (national park)
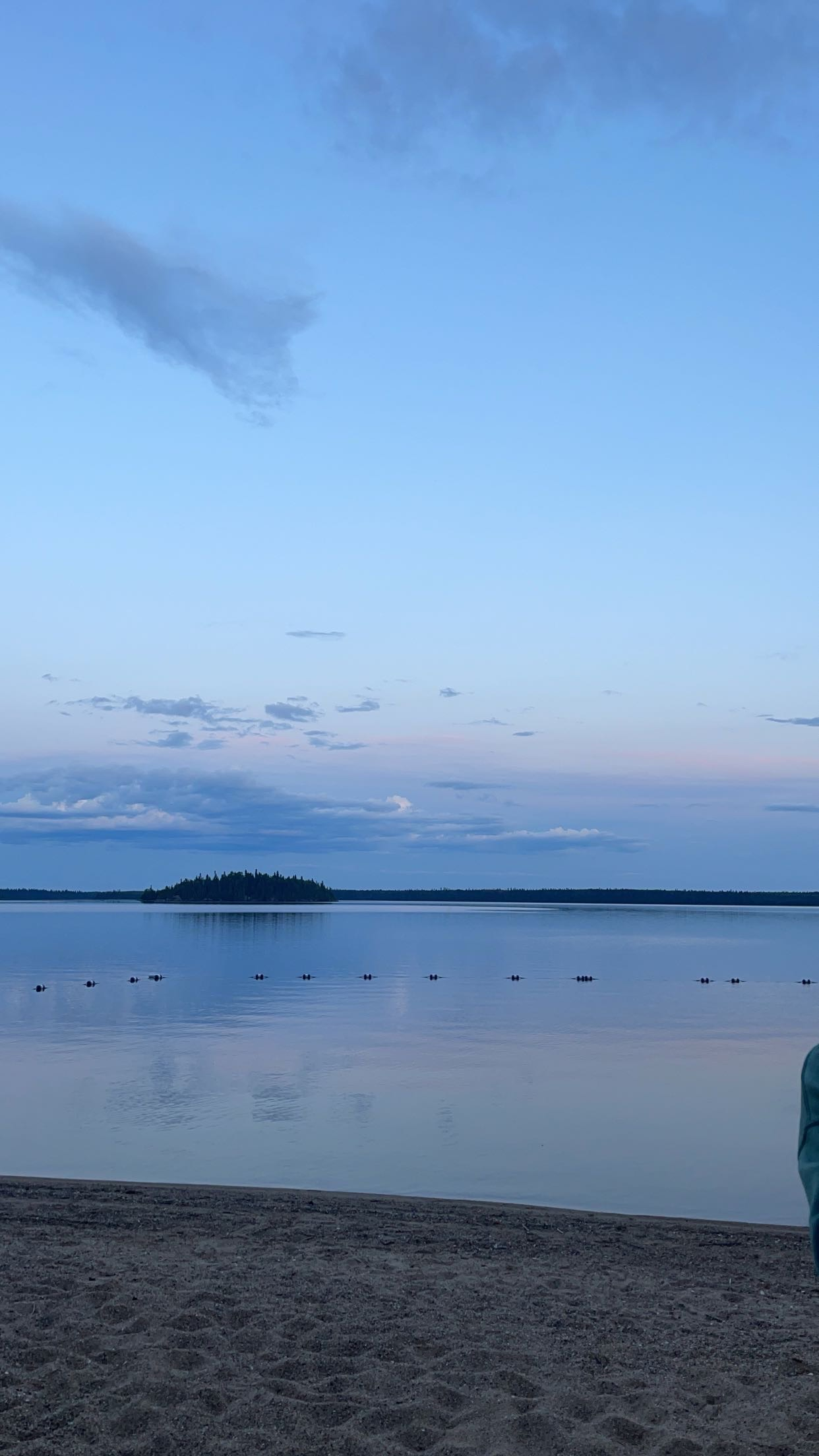
- Main beach and swimming area
- Interactive map of Fushimi Lake Provincial Park
- Location: Ontario, Canada
- Nearest city: Hearst
- Area: 5,294.00 ha (20.4402 sq mi)
- Established: 1979
- Named for: Fushimi Lake
- Governing body: Ontario Parks

Fushimi Lake Provincial Park is a provincial park in Cochrane District, Ontario, Canada. Encompassing the lake of the same name, the park is located 37 kilometres northwest of Hearst, and accessible by car via road connection to Highway 11. It is managed and staffed by Ontario Parks.

Fushimi Lake is classified as an operating park, open to the public during the summer season for both camping and day-use recreation. Facilities include a total of 74 campsites (of which 13 are backcountry), picnic and beach areas, a boat launch, park store, and several hiking trails. Limited roofed accommodations are also available.

== History and etymology ==
The park was originally established by the Ontario Ministry of Natural Resources in 1979. A fire lookout tower, constructed in the 1930s, once operated on the north shore of Fushimi Lake within current park boundaries. The steel structure, now disused, remains fully intact as a prominent attraction for visitors, and one of the few examples of its kind still standing in the area.

The lake for which the park is named, Fushimi Lake, derives its name from Prince Fushimi Hiroyasu of Imperial Japan, in commemoration of his royal visit to Toronto in 1907.

== See also ==
- Hearst, Ontario
- List of protected areas of Ontario
- Ontario Parks
