= Sandy Islands Provincial Park =

Provincial park in Ontario, Canada

- IUCN category Ia (strict nature reserve)
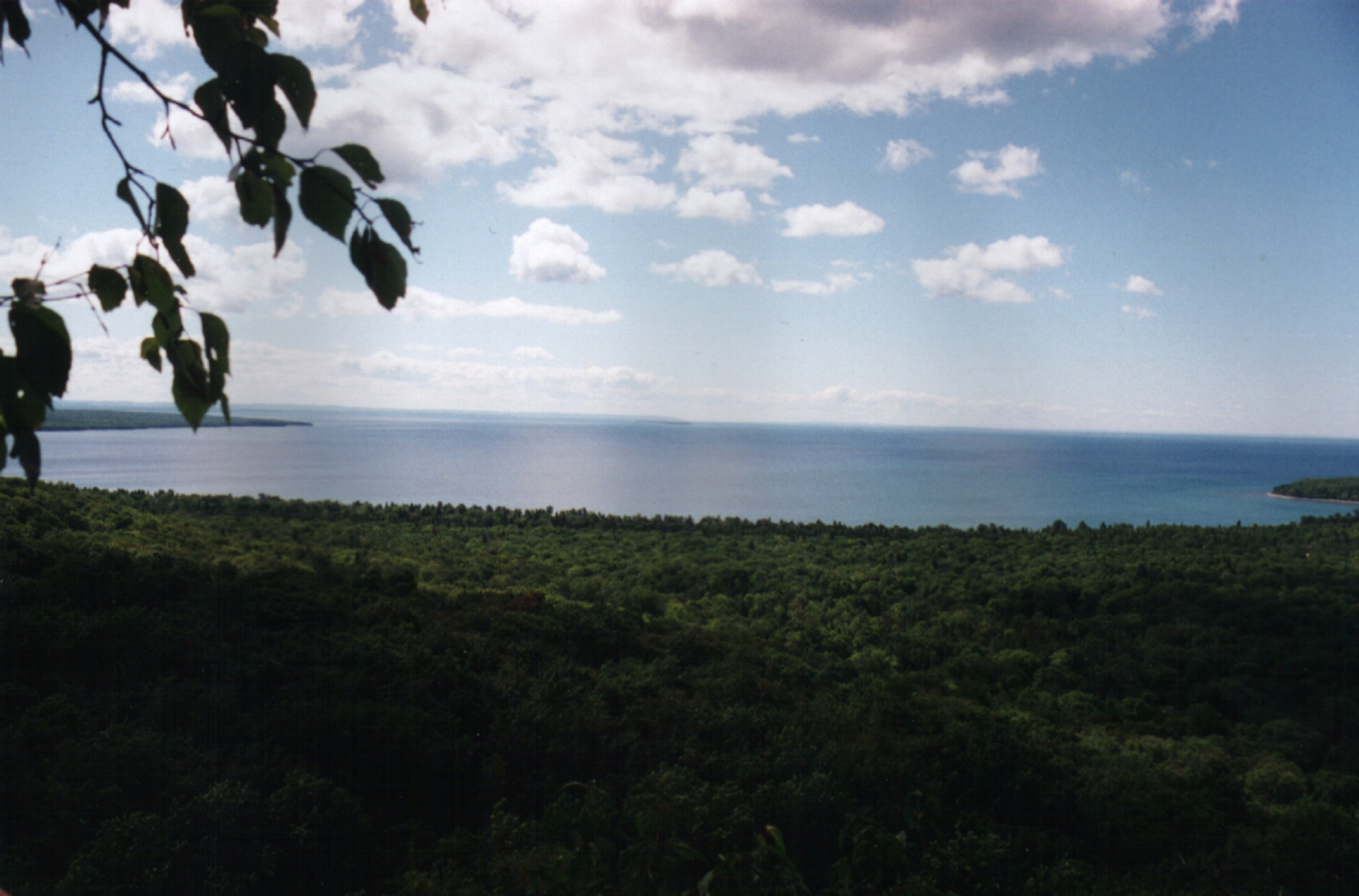

- Location within Ontario
- Location: Ontario, Canada
- Nearest city: Sault Ste. Marie, Ontario
- Coordinates: 46°49′0″N 84°39′0″W
- Area: 2,553 ha (6,310 acres)
- Established: 2001
- Governing body: Ontario Parks
- Website: www.ontarioparks.com/nonoperating/sandyislands

Sandy Islands Provincial Park is a non-operating park in the nature reserve class consisting of 2,553 hectares (6,310 acres). It is located in the large Whitefish Bay, near the mouth of the smaller Batchawana Bay in Lake Superior near Sault Ste. Marie, Ontario. The islands have an elevation of 183 meters above sea level. There are two islands, North Sandy Island and South Sandy Island. When the weather is clear the islands are visible from Pancake Bay Provincial Park close to the horizon looking south. The park was created as a measure to protect the fragile ecology of these sand islands.
