= Cultural Heritage Class Parks =

Classification of parks in Ontario, Canada

Cultural Heritage Class is the designation given by the Provincial Parks System of Ontario, Canada, for parks which emphasise the protection of historical and cultural resources, in an outdoor setting.

== See also ==
- List of Ontario parks
