= Caliper Lake Provincial Park =

Provincial park in Ontario, Canada

- IUCN category II (national park)
- Location within Ontario
- Interactive map of Caliper Lake Provincial Park
- Location: Rainy River District, Ontario, Canada
- Nearest city: Nestor Falls
- Coordinates: 49.061°N 93.913°W
- Area: 147 ha (360 acres)
- Established: 1960
- Visitors: 7,708 (in 2022)
- Governing body: Ontario Parks
- Website: www.ontarioparks.com/park/caliperlake

Caliper Lake Provincial Park is a small provincial park in northwestern Ontario, near the township of Nestor Falls. The park occupies 147 hectares (360 acres) alongside Caliper Lake. The facility is open for day use and overnight camping from mid-May to mid-September. The park features 83 campsites, many with electrical hookups, and some which may be rented for the entire season. The park offers many amenities, including a sandy beach, hiking trails, playground equipment, fish cleaning facilities, boat launches, bathrooms, and showers. Canoes, kayaks, and bicycles are available for rental.

The park is known for its beautiful red and white pine trees. Fish found in the lake include northern pike, walleye, crappie, and smallmouth bass. Pelicans, cranes, ducks, loons, and bald eagles are just some of the birds that can be found on the lake.

The park was closed for overnight camping in 2013 by the Ontario Ministry of Natural Resources. The township of Sioux Narrows-Nestor Falls reached an agreement with the Ministry of Natural Resources for the township to assume operation of the park.
