= Matinenda Provincial Park =

Provincial park in Ontario, Canada

- IUCN category II (national park)
- Location within Ontario
- Location: Algoma District, Ontario, Canada
- Coordinates: 46°21′26″N 82°56′07″W
- Area: 28,758 ha (111.04 sq mi)
- Designation: Natural Environment
- Established: 2003
- Named for: Matinenda Lake
- Governing body: Ontario Parks
- Website: www.ontarioparks.com/park/matinenda

Matinenda Provincial Park is a provincial park in Algoma District, Ontario, Canada. It is located 15 kilometres (9.3 mi) north of the Town of Blind River. It is a large, elongated, irregularly shaped park, centered around Matinenda Lake.

Matinenda Provincial Park is a non-operating park, meaning that there are no facilities or services for visitors. Permitted activities include boating, canoeing, backcountry camping, swimming, fishing, and hunting. In the winter, snowshoeing and snowmobiling can be done in the park.

Its landscape is characterized by 2 types of landforms: rugged Canadian Shield upland with exposed bedrock, lakes, and swamps; and low sandy hills with widespread lichen barrens. It includes 2 natural heritage areas, the Matinenda Jack Pine Barrens and Matinenda Pine-Hemlock.

Matinenda Provincial Park abuts the Blind River Provincial Park along its northern boundary. It is also surrounded by several noncontiguous sections of the Matinenda Lake Enhanced Management Area. This 31,400 hectares (78,000 acres) area regulates land use to provide further protection of the natural and recreational values of the Blind River and Matinenda Provincial Parks.

A variety of recreational trails are in or cut through the park:

- The Voyageur Hiking Trail cuts across a small portion in the southern end of the park.
- An snowmobile trail follows a utility corridor through the central part of the park. Another trail roughly parallels the Hydroline Road in the north of the park.
- Several established canoe routes go through the park, providing canoe access to the Blind River Provincial Park.

== Flora ==
Tree species in the park include:

- sugar maple
- eastern white cedar
- white pine
- red pine
- jack pine
- black spruce
- balsam fir
- red oak
- red maple
- hemlock
