= Pancake Bay Provincial Park =

Provincial park in Ontario, Canada

- IUCN category II (national park)
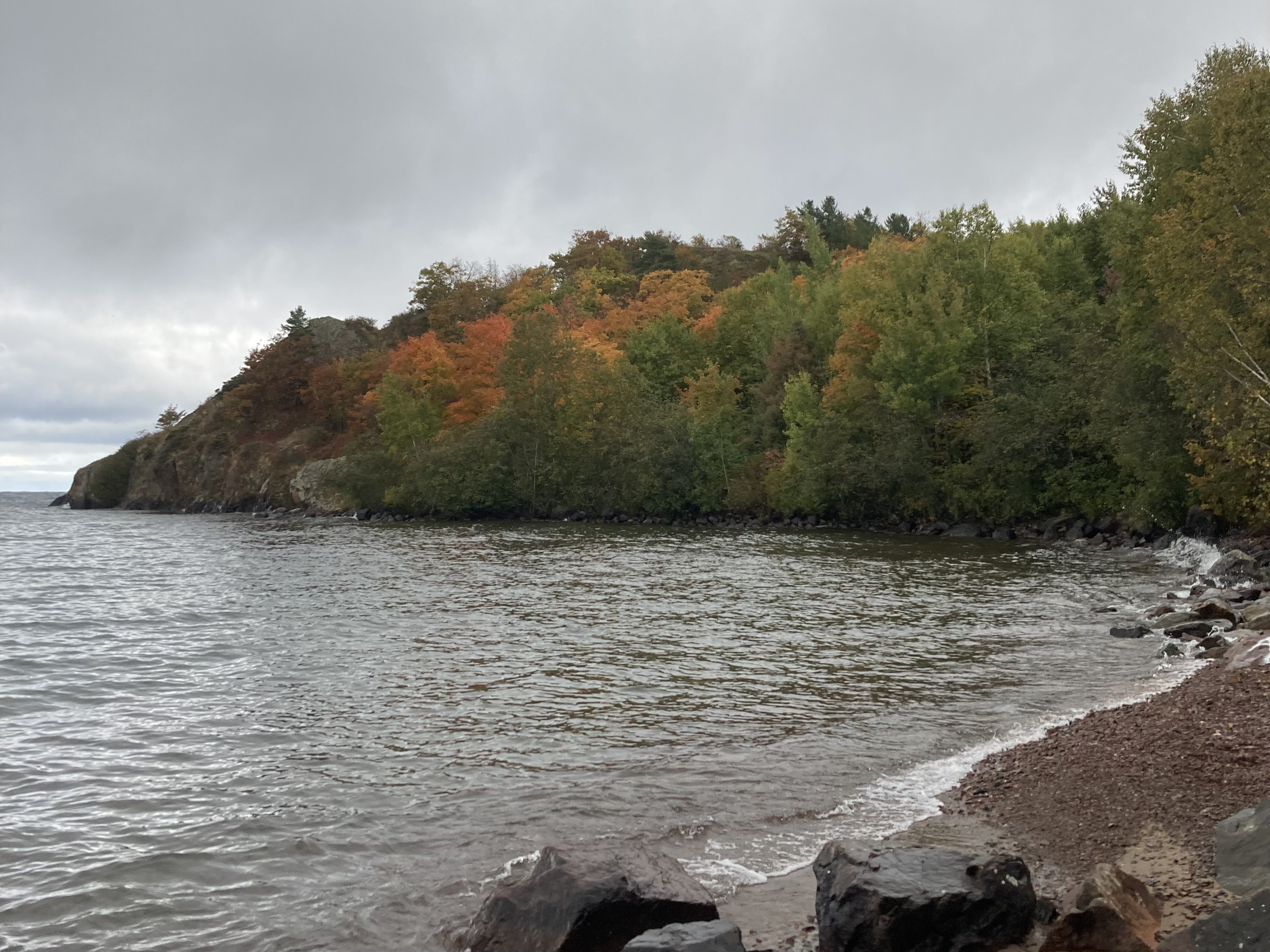
- The west side of Pancake Bay

- Location within Ontario
- Interactive map of Pancake Bay Provincial Park
- Location: Algoma District, Northeastern Ontario, Canada
- Nearest city: Sault Ste. Marie, Ontario
- Coordinates: 46°58′N 84°41′W
- Area: 17.23 km^{2} (6.65 sq mi)
- Established: 1968
- Visitors: 98,087 (in 2022)
- Governing body: Ontario Parks
- Website: www.ontarioparks.ca/park/pancakebay

Pancake Bay Provincial Park was established in 1968 by Ontario Parks. It is a recreation-class provincial park created to help preserve the fragile beach dune ecology. There are 325 campsites, including 160 with electricity. There are three comfort stations. Yurt camping is available in the park. Group camping sites are also available.

In 2006 Pancake Bay Provincial Park received an extension as part of Ontario's Living Legacy and now comprises 17.23 square kilometres (6.65 sq mi).

== Facilities ==
=== Park office ===
The park office is located on Ontario Highway 17 just past of the Agawa Crafts and Store (as coming from Sault Ste. Marie, Ontario). The park is open during the months of May to October. Senior staff, including the superintendent, can be reached at the park office between 9:00 am and 4:00 pm during summer months. The office is open from 8:00 am until 9:00 pm with overnight driving patrol.

=== Main campground ===
The main campground has approximately 250 sites. Two comfort stations are located in the main campground equipped with showers, laundry facilities and flush toilets. There is an amphitheater located in the campground and presentations by the park naturalists occur every weekend during the summer months. A flyer detailing the weekly events can be found in the park gatehouse. All the campsites in the main camp are within easy walking distance of the beach. The beachfront sites are subject to special premium rates. There are a large number of pull through sites for RVs and motor homes. Permits are obtained at the park gatehouse. Firewood is available for purchase at the gatehouse (seven days a week, 9:00 am to 10:00 pm) and from the park host on their site (Wednesday to Sunday, 4:00 pm to 6:00 pm).

=== Hilltop campground ===
Approximately 70 of the sites are located on a hill on the western end of the camping area. These are all large sites. They are close to the fen and the in-camp hiking trail but are a 5 to 8 minute walk from the beach. One of the comfort stations is located in the Hilltop campground. This comfort station does not have laundry facilities.

=== Group sites ===
There are five beachfront group camping sites available, accommodating between 13 and 40 campers. They are located in a separate area beyond the western end of the main campsite below the Hilltop sites.

=== Yurts ===
There are five yurts at the park. Two of the yurts are in the main campground, three are located on a beachfront location by the administration and day use areas. The yurts have a screened shelter tent and picnic table and a covered area beside the yurt where a propane barbecue grill is located. Each yurt sleeps six people with two bunkbeds (double bed on the bottom and a single on top). The yurt also contains a small fridge.

== Ecology ==
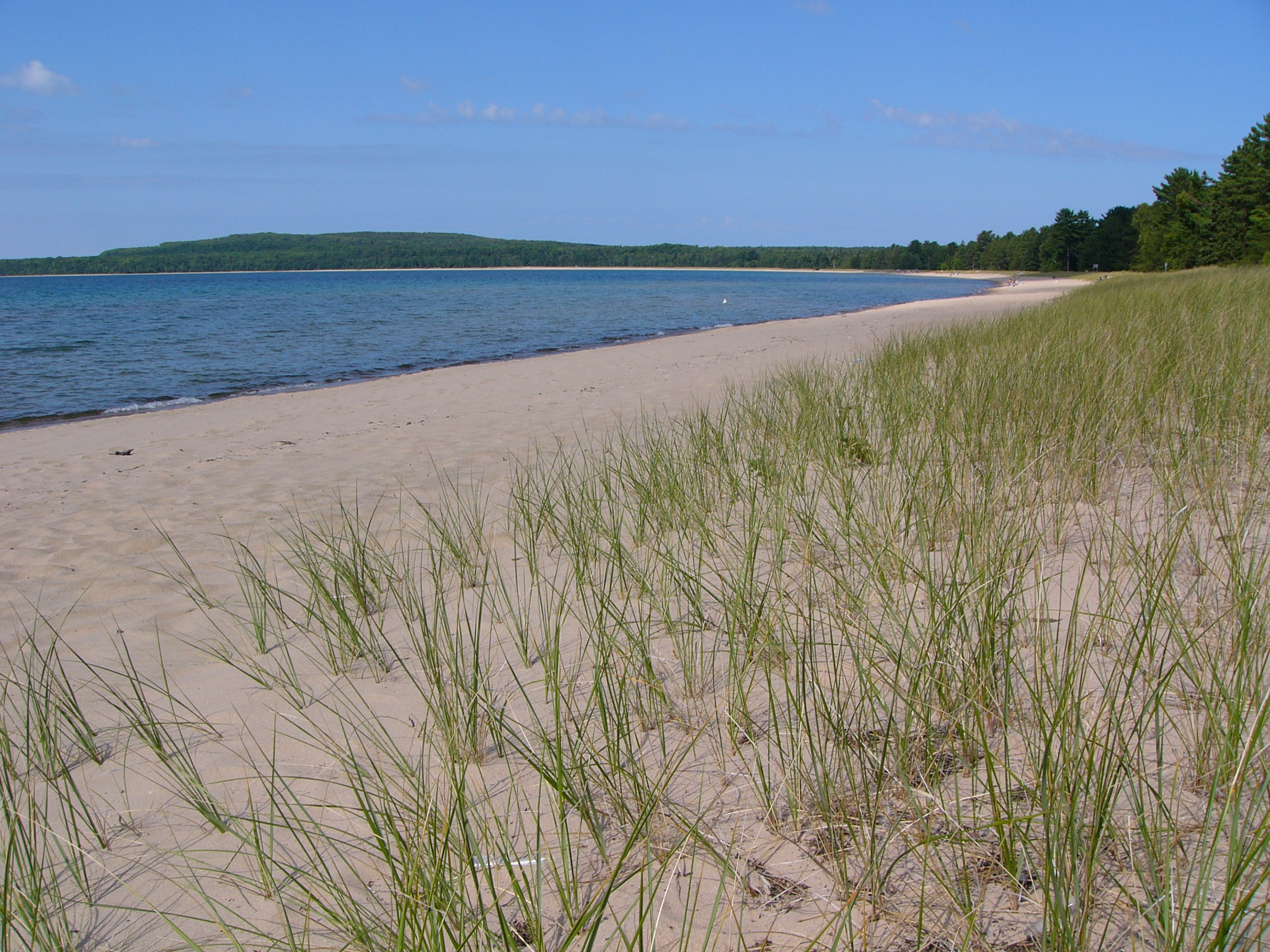
Pancake Bay beach with beach grass in foreground.

Pancake Bay is a sheltered, south-facing bay on the eastern shore of Lake Superior, north of Sault Ste. Marie, Ontario, Canada. A 5.5-kilometre (3.4 mi) sand beach lines the bay of which 3.5 km are within the park boundary. The bay is sand filled and shallow, which helps to warm the lake. Ancient beach ridges are visible more inland. The ecology of the region is characteristic of the Great Lakes-St. Lawrence transition forest, but is a northern shelter for more southerly flora and fauna.

The region is home to a number of regionally rare and vulnerable species, including Braun's holly fern, maidenhair spleenwort, sand reed and the majestic peregrine falcon. Along the Pancake Bay Nature Trail, you can find evidence of beach ridge succession over the millennia, a large conglomerate boulder believed to have been brought by glaciers, and a beautiful and ecologically sensitive fen (a type of wetland).

While at this park, one can see moose, black bears, sandhill cranes and other wildlife.

== Hiking and cycling ==
There are two marked trails, the 3.5 km Pancake Bay Nature Trail and the 14 km Lookout Trail. From the Lookout Trail one can view a panorama of the Canadian Shield, and from the Edmund Fitzgerald Lake Superior Lookout along that trail one can see to the west the area of Lake Superior where the SS Edmund Fitzgerald sank in a fierce November storm in 1975.

Biking is also allowed on the Lookout Trail.
