= Tidewater Provincial Park =

Provincial park in Ontario, Canada

- IUCN category II (national park)
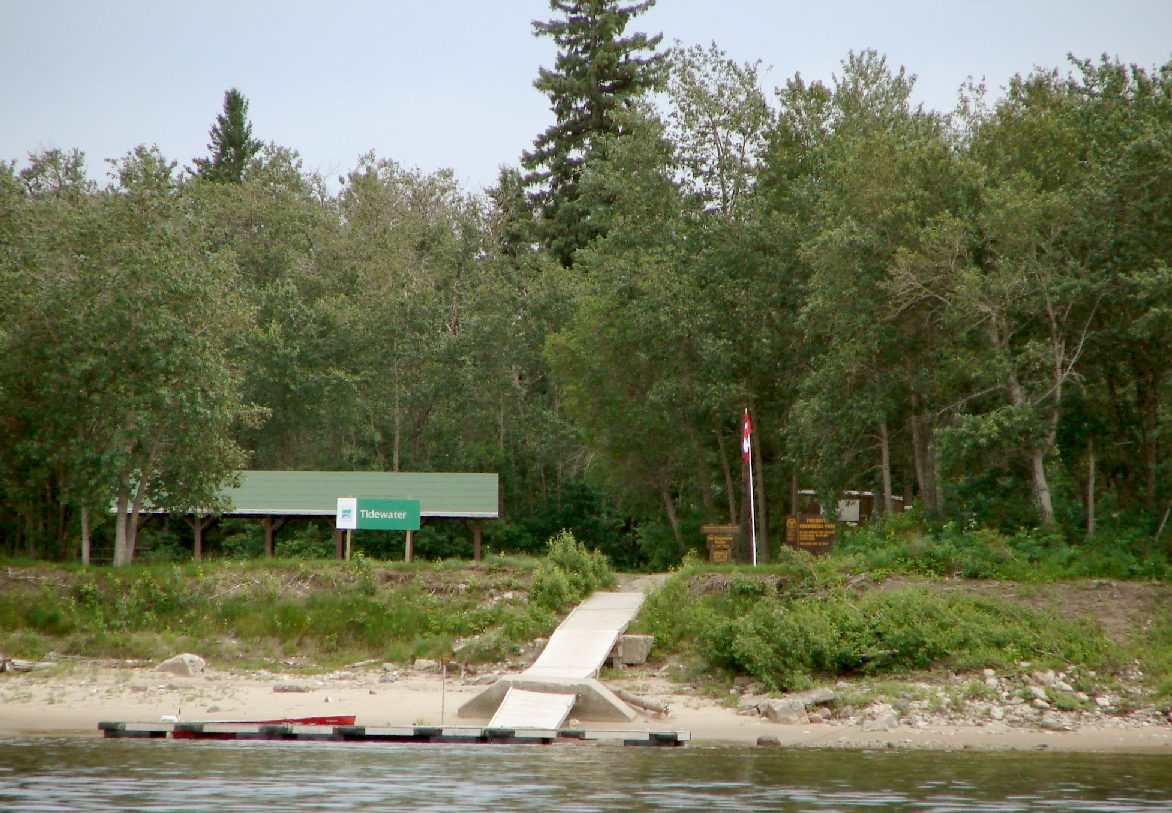

- Location within Ontario
- Interactive map of Tidewater Provincial Park
- Location: Cochrane District, Northeastern Ontario, Canada
- Nearest city: Moosonee, Ontario
- Coordinates: 51°15′45″N 80°37′30″W
- Area: 980 ha (2,400 acres)
- Established: 1964
- Governing body: Ontario Parks (operated by the Town of Moosonee)
- Website: https://www.ontarioparks.ca/park/tidewater

Tidewater Provincial Park is a provincial park located on five islands in the Moose River estuary between Moosonee and Moose Factory, Ontario, Canada:

- Charles Island
- South Charles Island
- Butler Island
- Hayes Island
- Bushy Island

The park was created in 1964 and is operated by the Town of Moosonee rather than the Ministry of Natural Resources. Access to the park is by boat only, including water taxis from Moosonee.

== Camping ==
Overnight camping was eliminated due to cuts in 2012 and park is no longer listed on the Ontario Parks website.

As of 2015 Tidewater is again listed on the Ontario Parks website and pamphlets are displayed at Provincial Parks promoting Tidewater as a destination. Though the park is operational, it only consists of 20 tent sites that are available on a first-come-first-served basis.
