= Aaron Provincial Park =

Provincial park in Ontario, Canada

- IUCN category II (national park)
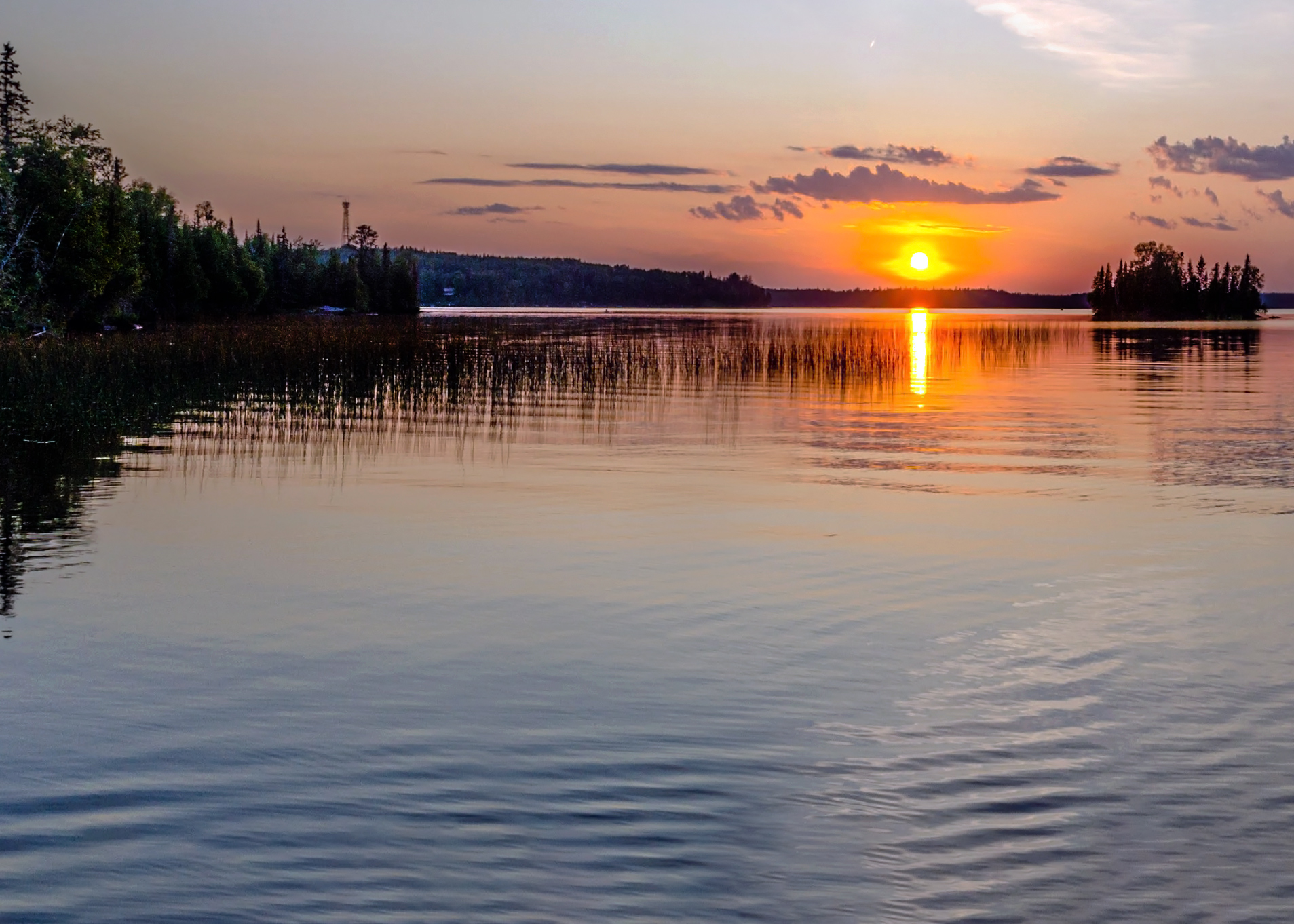
- To the south of Thunder Lake is the surrounding Aaron Provincial Park, camera viewing north.

- Location within Ontario
- Interactive map of Aaron Provincial Park
- Location: Kenora District, Ontario, Canada
- Nearest town: Dryden, Ontario
- Coordinates: 49°45′42.2″N 92°39′23.4″W
- Area: 116 ha (290 acres)
- Elevation: 382 m (1,253 ft)
- Established: 1958
- Named for: Original homestead of John. T. Aaron
- Visitors: 15,009 (in 2022)
- Governing body: Ontario Parks
- Website: Official website

Aaron Provincial Park is a park in Kenora District, Ontario, Canada, located 26 kilometres (16 mi) east of the community of Dryden. It can be accessed via Highway 17. Aaron Provincial Park is located on the east end of Thunder Lake. The park, established in 1958, covers approximately 116.7 hectares.
