= Bonheur River Kame Provincial Park =

Provincial park in Ontario, Canada

- IUCN category Ia (strict nature reserve)
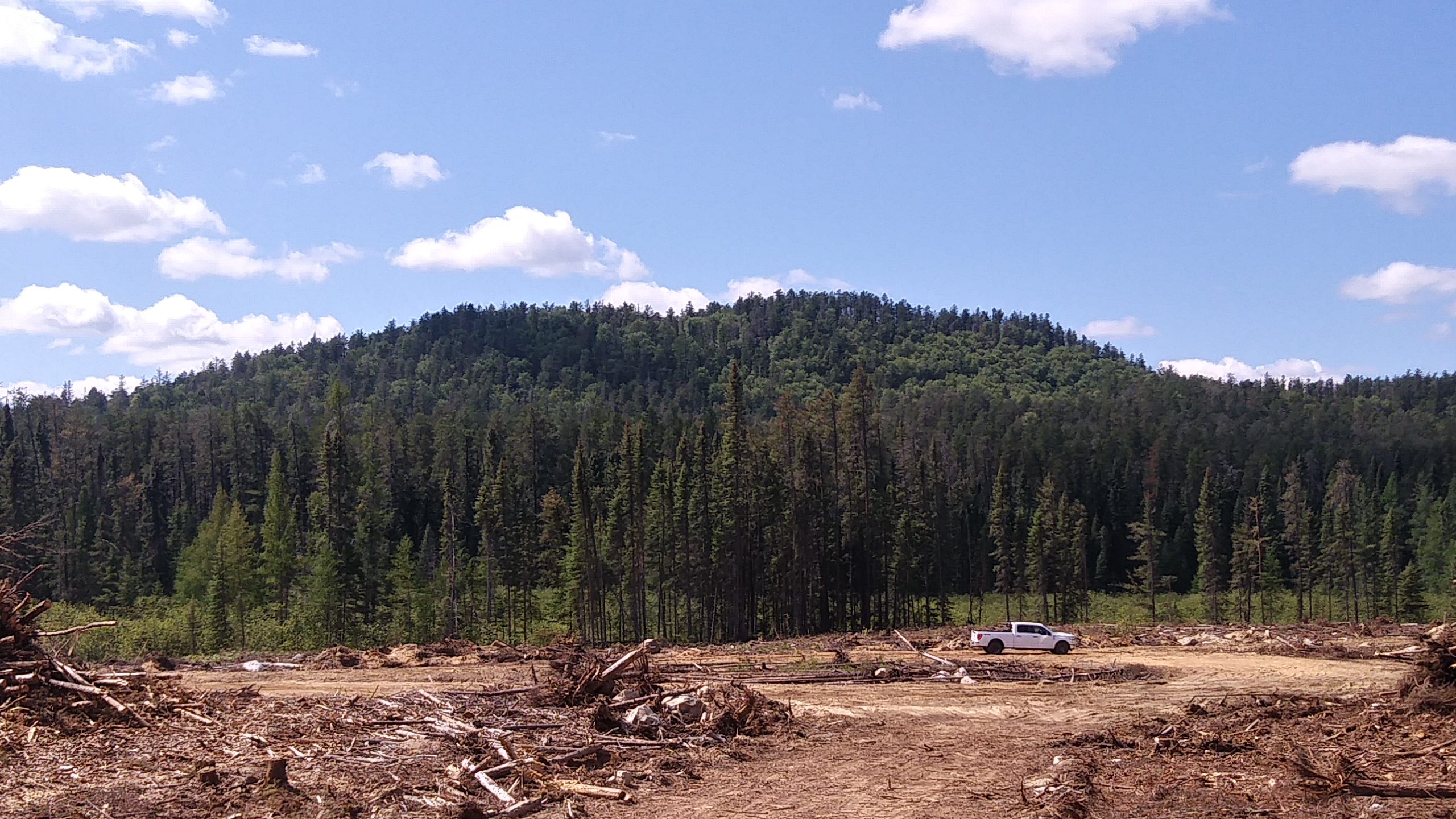
- The kame from the northeast

- Location within Ontario
- Location: Ontario, Canada
- Nearest city: Ignace
- Coordinates: 49°23′58″N 91°14′1″W
- Area: 800 ha (2,000 acres)
- Established: 1985
- Governing body: Ontario Parks

Bonheur River Kame Provincial Park is an 800-hectare (2,000-acre) provincial nature reserve in Ontario, Canada. It is approximately 35 kilometres (22 mi) east of the town of Ignace, and north of Burk Township. It became a nature reserve in 1985 via provincial legislation, primarily to protect the kame it contains, which is an important earth science feature.

The park features a distinctive and "spectacular moulin kame" which surges 80 metres (260 ft) above a peat plain. The undisturbed kame, essentially a cone-shaped hill, lies in forest cover typical of the southern portions of the Boreal Shield ecozone.

As a nature reserve, the only acceptable human activity in the park is the observation of wildlife and birds. Development is banned, as is tourism and even subsistence activities such as fishing and hunting.
