= Halfway Lake Provincial Park =

Provincial park in Ontario, Canada

- IUCN category II (national park)
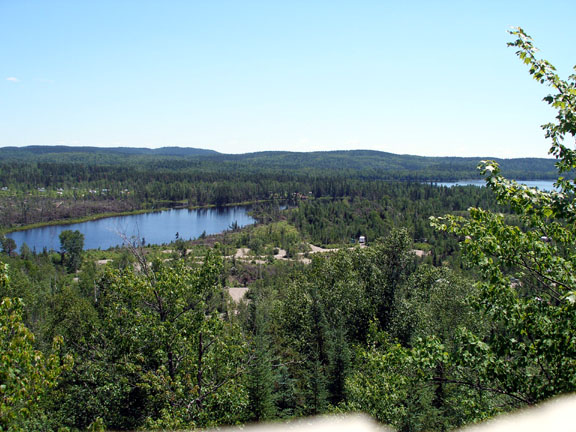
- Raven Lake left and Halfway Lake right, campgrounds centre fore and rear

- Location within Ontario
- Interactive map of Halfway Lake Provincial Park
- Location: Sudbury, Northeastern Ontario, Ontario, Canada
- Nearest town: Cartier, Ontario
- Coordinates: 46°54′39″N 81°39′11″W
- Area: 47.30 km^{2} (18.26 sq mi)
- Elevation: 441 m (1,447 ft)
- Established: 1985
- Visitors: 81,379 (in 2022)
- Operator: Ontario Parks
- Website: Official website

Halfway Lake Provincial Park is a provincial park astride Ontario Highway 144 in Sudbury District in northeastern Ontario, Canada. It is operated by Ontario Parks and is named for Halfway Lake, which is entirely within the park grounds. The nearest settlement on Highway 144 is Cartier, about 25 kilometres (16 mi) to the south. The park contains more than a dozen lakes, including Antrim Lake, Bailey Lake, Benny Lake, Bittern Lake, Burnt Ridge Lake, Halfway Lake, Lodge Lake, Moosemuck Lake, Otter Lake, Raven Lake, Three Island Lake, Trapper Lake, and Two Narrows Lake. There are a mix of 221 electrical and non-electrical sites in the two campgrounds (namely Hawksnest Campground and Wild Rose Campground), 10 interior canoe-access sites located on Antrim Lake, Bailey Lake, and Trapper Lake, plus an additional five interior hike-access sites located along the Hawk Ridge Trail.

== Sources ==
- "Halfway Lake Provincial Park". Geographical Names Data Base. Natural Resources Canada.
- "Topographic Map sheet 41I13". Atlas of Canada. Natural Resources Canada. 2010-02-04.
