= Sedgman Lake Provincial Park =

Provincial park in Ontario, Canada

- IUCN category Ia (strict nature reserve)
- Location within Ontario
- Location: Ontario, Canada
- Coordinates: 50°38′10″N 87°41′49″W
- Established: 1985

Sedgman Lake Provincial Park is a provincial park operated by Ontario Parks located in the District of Thunder Bay, Ontario. Sedgman Lake was named May 5, 1960, in honour of World War II casualty Private Alfred Thomas Sedgman, who died while serving in the Canadian Army (Argyll & Sutherland Highlanders) on February 26, 1945.
