= Adair Lake Conservation Reserve =

Conservation reserve in Ontario, Canada

Coordinates: 49°37′17″N 92°12′8″W

Adair Lake Conservation Reserve is an Ontario conservation reserve located near Kenora, Ontario. The reserve was created by the Government of Ontario in 2003. The reserve is 2,800 hectares (11 sq mi) in size.

== Geography ==
Most of the reserve is made up of peatland. The peatland is drained by Melgund Creek. The peat is shallow, roughly 1m deep and has a floor of fine sand. There is little to no human impact on the conservation reserve and remains relatively pristine. Within the conservation reserve there are several different plant species. Further development on the reserve is banned, however sport hunting and fishing are allowed.
