= Rushing River Provincial Park =

Provincial Park in Ontario, Canada

- IUCN category II (national park)
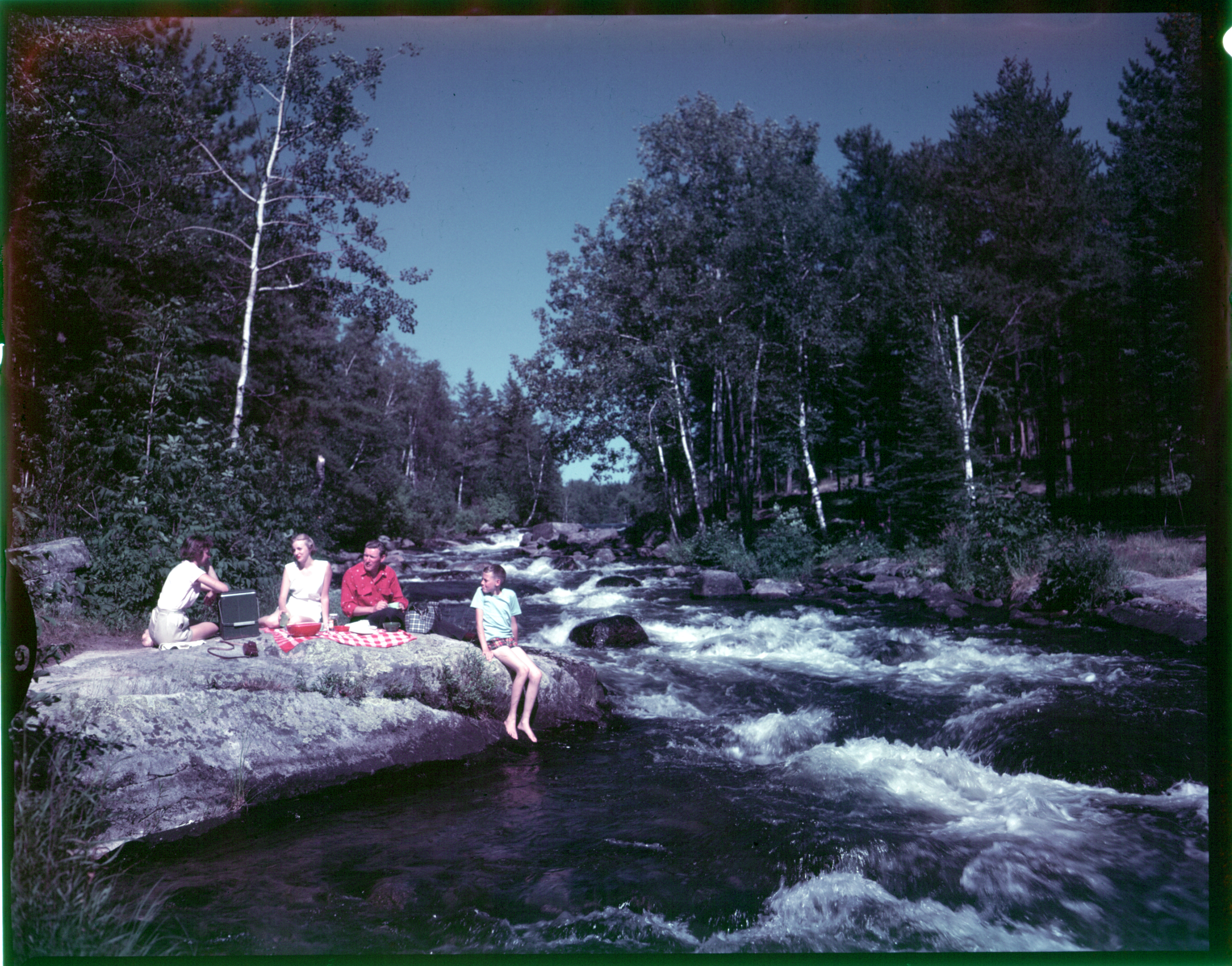

- Location within Ontario
- Interactive map of Rushing River Provincial Park
- Location: Kenora District, Ontario, Canada
- Nearest city: Kenora
- Coordinates: 49°41′22″N 94°13′40″W
- Area: 340 ha (840 acres)
- Designation: Recreational
- Established: 1958
- Visitors: 75,300 (in 2022)
- Governing body: Ontario Parks
- Website: www.ontarioparks.com/park/rushingriver

Rushing River Provincial Park is 20 kilometres (12 mi) southeast of Kenora, Ontario, Canada. It is a family campground at the mouth of the Rushing River where it enters Dogtooth Lake. It is a gateway to Eagle-Dogtooth Provincial Park, that borders on its east side.

The park has predominantly glacial features. The Park features swimming, boating, canoe, kayak and stand up paddle board rentals, as well as fishing, hiking, and camping including electrical and non electrical sites.
