= Sandbar Lake Provincial Park =

Provincial park in Ontario, Canada

- IUCN category II (national park)
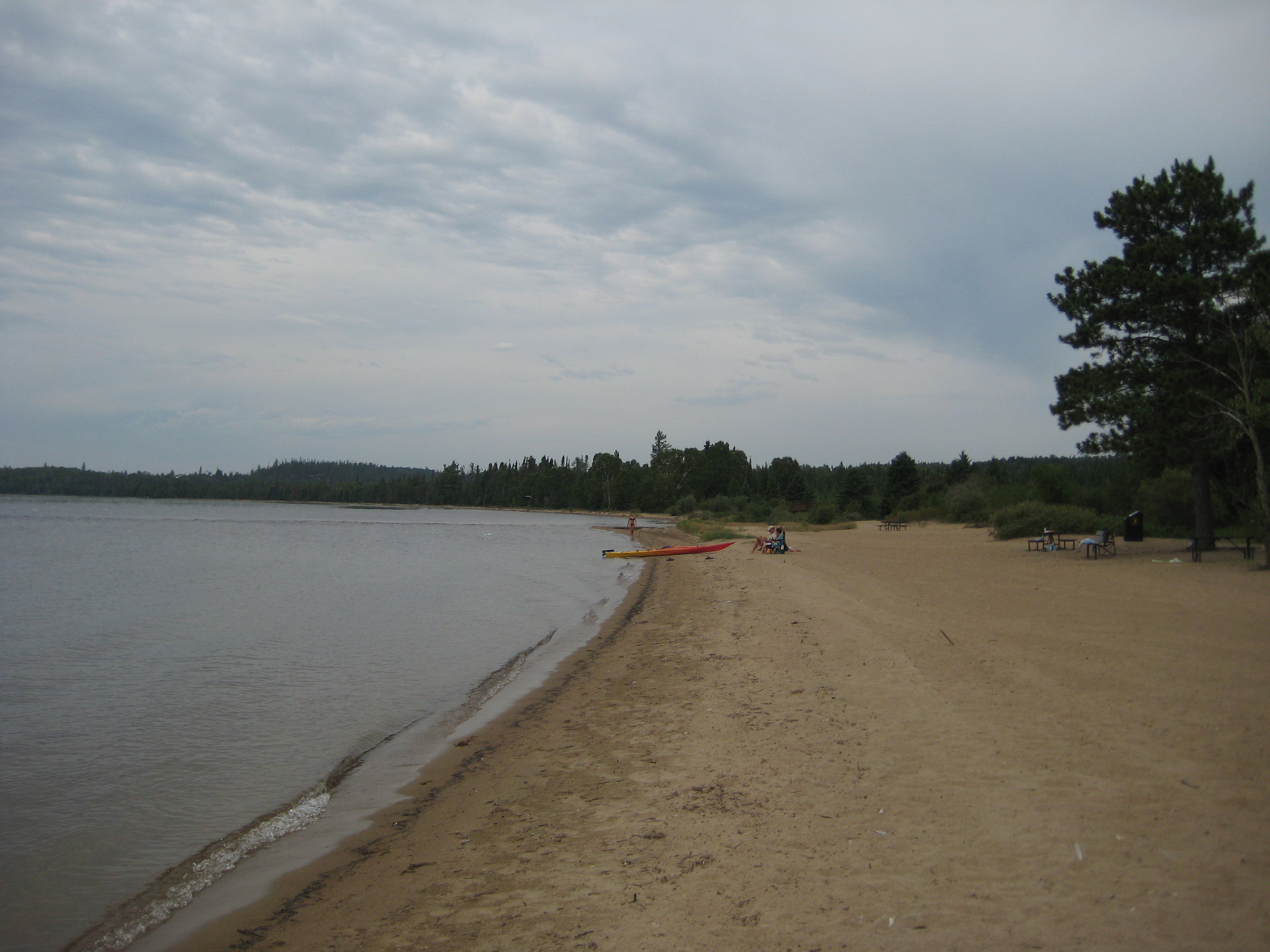
- Beach within the park in mid August

- Location within Ontario
- Interactive map of Sandbar Lake Provincial Park
- Location: Kenora District, Ontario, Canada
- Nearest city: Ignace, Ontario
- Coordinates: 49°29′38″N 91°34′26″W
- Established: 1970
- Visitors: 14,959 (in 2022)
- Governing body: Ontario Parks
- Website: www.ontarioparks.com/park/sandbarlake

Sandbar Lake Provincial Park is a provincial park located 11 kilometres (6.8 mi) north of Ignace, Ontario.

== History ==
In May 2026, an area of the park was burned by forest fire Dryden 11 (DRY011). The park was temporarily closed and evacuated as a result.
