= Minnitaki Kames Provincial Park =

Provincial park in Ontario, Canada

- IUCN category Ia (strict nature reserve)
- Location within Ontario
- Location: Ontario, Canada
- Nearest city: Sioux Lookout
- Coordinates: 49°54′0″N 91°52′0″W
- Area: 4,422 ha (10,930 acres)
- Established: 1989
- Governing body: Ontario Parks

Minnitaki Kames Provincial Park is a 4,422-hectare (10,930-acre) nature reserve in Ontario, Canada, designated to protect several distinguishing features, including east–west kame ridges and numerous terraces. It abuts the shores of Minnitaki Lake, with the nearest settlement at Sioux Lookout, about 20 km to the north.

Each of the five large kames, the largest in northwestern Ontario, "is completely covered by an extensive jack pine dominated closed coniferous forest". The largest covers over 12 square kilometres (4.6 sq mi), rising about 30 m (98 ft) above the gently sloping bedrock, which attains elevations between 358 m and 437 m.

These glacial features are related to Lake Agassiz, and were deposited about 9,500 to 10,000 years ago during the Timiskaming Interstadial.
