= W.J.B. Greenwood Provincial Park =

Provincial park in Ontario, Canada

- IUCN category II (national park)

- Location within Ontario
- Location: Timiskaming, Northeastern Ontario, Ontario, Canada
- Coordinates: 47°18′29″N 79°48′47″W
- Area: 465 ha (1,150 acres)
- Elevation: 310 m (1,020 ft)
- Established: 1985
- Named for: Ben Greenwood, Ontario's first chief of the Division of Parks, 1954 to 1960
- Website: www.ontarioparks.com/nonoperating/wjbgreenwood

W.J.B. Greenwood Provincial Park is a non-operating recreational class park and protected area in the town of Latchford, Timiskaming District in Northeastern Ontario, Canada. It is on the southern shores of Bay Lake on the Montreal River, part of the Saint Lawrence River drainage basin, and is in the Great Lakes - St. Lawrence Forest / Boreal Forest transition zone biome. The park was established in 1985 and is named for Ben Greenwood, Ontario's first chief of the Division of Parks, 1954 to 1960.
