= Gravel River Provincial Park =

Provincial park in Ontario, Canada

- Gravel River Provincial Nature Reserve
- IUCN category II (national park)
- Location within Ontario
- Location: Thunder Bay District, Ontario, Canada
- Nearest city: Nipigon
- Coordinates: 48.91943496°N 87.75545951°W
- Area: 763 ha (1,890 acres)
- Established: 1985
- Governing body: Ontario Parks

Gravel River Provincial Park is a nature reserve in the Thunder Bay District of Ontario, Canada. It protects an unusual birds-foot delta at the mouth of the Gravel River.

== Location ==
Gravel River Provincial Park covers 763 hectares (1,890 acres). The park is in the Thunder Bay District of Ontario, Canada, on Nipigon Bay, Lake Superior, at the mouth of the Gravel River. The park also includes the Little Gravel River and the Naomikan (Dead) River, which may be the course of the Gravel River before the railway line was built.

The Trans-Canada Highway (Highway 17) runs through the park from east to west. A power transmission line crosses the northern end of the park, and a snowmobile trail runs parallel to the power corridor. A Canadian Pacific railway line crosses the park from east to west. There was an MNR waste disposal site in the park, but it has been closed and moved to a new location. The park covers the east and center of Gravel Point, projecting into Lake Superior, but the western side of the point is a cottage subdivision that is not included in the park. The cottages are accessed by Mountain Bay Road, which runs south through the park from Highway 17.

== Park ==
The park was established in 1985, and is classified as a Nature Reserve. It is in the Ministry of Natural Resources' Nipigon District of the Northwest Region. There are no visitor facilities and camping is not allowed. The park may be used during the day for canoeing, fishing, walking, nature appreciation and wildlife viewing.

== Environment ==
The park is well-forested, and protects the land around the mouth of the slow-moving river, which meanders through the sands of its bird's foot deltaic fan. This is one of a small number of active deltas of this type in the Canadian Great Lakes. The park is in the boreal forest ecosystem. Controlled burning may be used as a substitute for natural forest fires, which are necessary for maintenance and renewal of the vegetation.

The peninsula is visited by many seasonally migrating waterfowl, and is used for nesting by shore birds. There is a nesting colony of great blue heron (Ardea herodias). Animal species include white-tailed deer (Odocoileus virginianus), moose (Alces alces), snowshoe hare (Lepus americanus) and Canada lynx (Lynx canadensis). Lake sturgeon (Acipenser fulvescens) are thought to spawn in the lower Gravel River, and northern brook lamprey (Ichthyomyzon fossor) have been found in the river.

== Sources ==
- Gravel River, Ontario Parks
- Gravel River Provincial Nature Reserve, Natural Resources Canada
- Sillivan, Tim (May 2013), Gravel River Provincial Park Management Statement
