= Potholes Provincial Park =

Provincial park in Ontario, Canada

- IUCN category Ia (strict nature reserve)
- Location within Ontario
- Interactive map of Potholes Provincial Park
- Location: Algoma District, Ontario, Canada
- Nearest town: Wawa
- Coordinates: 47°57′08.8″N 84°15′53.3″W
- Area: 247 ha (610 acres)
- Elevation: 382 m (1,253 ft)
- Established: 1985
- Visitors: 352 (in 2022)
- Website: https://www.ontarioparks.ca/park/potholes

Potholes Provincial Park is a park in Algoma District, Ontario, Canada, located 38 kilometres (24 mi) east of the community of Wawa. It can be accessed via Ontario Highway 101.
