= Lake Nipigon Provincial Park =

Provincial park in Ontario, Canada

- IUCN category II (national park)
- Location within Ontario
- Location: Ontario, Canada
- Coordinates: 49°29′00″N 88°08′00″W
- Area: 1,357 ha (3,350 acres)
- Established: 1960

Lake Nipigon Provincial Park is a provincial park located on the east side of Lake Nipigon in Ontario, Canada. The park covers an area of 1,357 hectares (3,350 acres). In 1999, the park boundary was amended to transfer some land to the Government of Canada for a reserve for the Sand Point First Nation. The park is currently not operating, and there are no visitor facilities.

The park was originally established as Blacksand Provincial Park in July 1960, and was fully operational with 80 campsites in 1961. The park was renamed Lake Nipigon Provincial Park in 1978 to better reflect its geographic location. The campground was closed in 1994, and a portion of park, including the former campground area, was deregulated in 1999 for the establishment of the Sand Point First Nation reserve. Transfer of those lands to the federal government and creation of the reserve was finalized in 2011.
