= Opasquia Provincial Park =

Provincial park in Ontario, Canada

- IUCN category Ib (wilderness area)
- Location within Ontario
- Interactive map of Opasquia Provincial Park
- Location: Ontario, Canada
- Coordinates: 53°32′N 93°05′W
- Area: 473,000 ha (1,170,000 acres)
- Established: 1983
- Website: www.ontarioparks.com/park/opasquia/

Opasquia Provincial Park is a provincial park located in northwest Ontario, Canada. Situated alongside the Manitoba border, this remote park is approximately 473,000 hectares (1,170,000 acres) in size. The Opasquia park is home to many different species of plants and animals.

== Geographical features ==
Located approximately 245 kilometres (152 mi) north of Red Lake, Ontario, the Opasquia has no road access, even during the winter highway season. The park is accessible by float plane only. Hundreds of lakes and dozens of rivers flow northwest through this 473,000-hectare (1,170,000-acre) park. The northwestern water flow is considered an anomaly due to the fact all other bodies of water in Ontario flow northeast towards Hudson Bay and James Bay. This can be attributed to the Cocos Plateau formed from glaciers during the last ice age.

The reason the Opasquia Park has been protected as a wilderness park has more to do with its distinctive geology. A ridge of glacial till two kilometres wide rises 100 metres above its surroundings here. This is called the Opasquia Moraine. On the sides of the moraine, wave-cut terraces and segments of raised shoreline indicate the former limit of glacial Lake Agassiz.

== Wildlife ==
The wolverine population is what makes this park unique. Opasquia Provincial Park supports one of the largest concentration of wolverines in North America. The park also has large numbers of moose, bear, eagles, otters, beavers, and wolves. Hundreds of others species of birds have been identified, and northern pike and walleye dominate the fisheries in this park. Whitefish and perch have also been found in its waters.

== Park facilities ==
This park is a non-operating park, which means it does not have any visitors’ facilities. There is one known fly-in tourist operation located within the park named Big Hook Wilderness Camps . The resort caters to fisherman and nature lovers.
