= Ontario Parks =

Provincial government ministry protecting parks in Ontario

Agency overview
- Formed: 1893
- Jurisdiction: Government of Ontario
- Headquarters: 300 Water Street, Peterborough, Ontario
- Minister responsible: Todd McCarthy (politician), Minister of the Environment
- Website: ontarioparks.ca

Ontario Parks is a branch of the Ministry of the Environment, Conservation and Parks in Ontario, Canada, that protects significant natural and cultural resources in a system of parks and protected areas that is sustainable and provides opportunities for inspiration, enjoyment and education. The Ontario Parks system covers over 78,000 square kilometres (30,000 sq mi), which is about 10 per cent of the province's surface area or the equivalent of an area approximately equal to New Brunswick. It falls under the responsibility and mandate of the province's Ministry of the Environment, Conservation and Parks. It was formerly under the mandate of the Ministry of Natural Resources, under the Department of Lands and Forests.

The Ontario Parks system has been used as a model for other parks systems in North America. This can be attributed to its delicate balance of recreation, preservation and conservation.

Many parks in Ontario also offer a Natural Heritage Education program (also called interpretive services or visitor services).

== History ==
The Ontario Parks system began in 1893 with the creation of Algonquin Park, originally designed to protect loggers' interests from settlement. The management and creation of provincial parks came under the Department of Lands and Forests in 1954 and led to a period of accelerated park creation: a ninefold increase in the number of parks over the next six years. In the 1970s the Ontario Ministry of Natural Resources (MNR) was formed. The MNR expanded to include forestry operations within the province, becoming the Ministry of Natural Resources and Forestry (MNRF) in approximately 2010, and became more focused on Forestry and species protection and enforcement via Conservation Officers. Ontario Parks is a branch of the Ministry of Environment, Conservation, and Parks (MECP). Until recently, Ontario Parks as a whole was under the mandate of the Ministry of Natural Resources and Forestry (MNRF).

The history of Ontario's provincial parks stretches for over 100 years. Here are some of the milestones from the past century plus:

1893 – Algonquin Park is created as a public park and forest reservation, fish and game preserve, health resort and pleasure ground.

1894 – Rondeau becomes Ontario's second provincial park.

1913 – The Parks Act sets aside land not suitable for agriculture or settlement.

1954 – Ontario still has only eight provincial parks: Algonquin, Quetico, Long Point, Rondeau, Presqu'ile, Ipperwash, Lake Superior and Sibley (now known as Sleeping Giant).

A Division of Parks is created within the Department of Lands and Forests. This heralds a new and aggressive program to create more parks, primarily on the Great Lake and northern tourism highways.

1960 – There are now 72 provincial parks in Ontario, hosting over 5 million visitors annually.

1967 – Ontario introduces a new policy that divides parks into specific categories, or classes, with compatible sets of uses.

1970 – Polar Bear, Ontario's largest provincial park at 24,000 square kilometres, is created.

1978 – Ontario Provincial Parks: Planning and Management Policies are approved by Cabinet giving Ontario one of the world's leading parks planning systems.

1983 – The new land use planning system leads to the announcement of 155 new parks to be designated.

1985 – There are now 220 parks in Ontario encompassing over 5.5 million hectares of land.

1993 – Ontario celebrates the centennial of the provincial parks system and Algonquin's 100th anniversary.

1996 – The provincial parks system adopts a new entrepreneurial operating model where revenue generated by parks can be reinvested in the parks system. This is symbolized by a new name, Ontario Parks, and a new visual identity.

1996 – Ontario Parks partners with the Nature Conservancy of Canada to create Legacy 2000, a program to protect significant natural areas. Under this agreement more than 11,000 hectares are secured.

1999 – Ontario's Living Legacy is announced. This land use strategy identifies 378 new protected areas, including 61 new parks and 45 parks additions. Ontario's Living Legacy will protect over 2.4 million hectares of land, including additions to the provincial parks system of over 900,000 hectares.

2001 – Ontario now has a total of 280 provincial parks encompassing 7.1 million hectares or almost nine per cent of the province's area. Over 9 million visitors annually enjoy Ontario Parks.

2007 – Introduction of new legislation: Provincial Parks and Conservation Reserves Act with 329 provincial parks and 292 conservation reserves.

2018 – Ontario Parks changes hands from the Ministry of Natural Resources and Forestry to the newly created Ministry of Environment, Conservation and Parks. All employees including Park Wardens are now employed by the Ministry of Environment, Conservation and Parks.

2018 – Ontario celebrates 125 years of the provincial parks system and Algonquin's 125th anniversary.

== Provincial park classes ==
Ontario Parks system uses a classification system to divide the provincial parks into the following categories:

- Recreational Class Park "typically have good beaches, many campgrounds and lots of outdoor recreation opportunities. Most recreation parks provide services that may include toilets and showers, laundromats, interpretive programs, playgrounds, boat launch facilities, hiking trails and picnic tables."
- Cultural Heritage Class Park "emphasize the protection of historical and cultural resources, in an outdoor setting."
- Natural Environment Class Park "protect the landscapes and special features of the natural region in which they are located, while providing ample opportunities for activities such as swimming and camping."
- Nature Reserve Class Park "are established to represent and protect the distinctive natural habitats and landforms of the province. These areas are protected for educational and research purposes. Due to the fragility of many of these natural features, only a few nature reserves are accessible to the public."
- Waterway Class Park "are river corridors that provide canoeists with high-quality recreation and historical river travel."
- Wilderness Class Park "are large areas left to nature where visitors may travel on foot or by canoe. Offering little if any facilities for visitors, these areas provide the solitude of an undisturbed, natural setting."

== Parks system ==
As of 2008, Ontario Parks system manages 63 recreational class parks (394.8 km^{2}), six Cultural Heritage Class Parks (67.4 km^{2}), 83 natural environment class parks (14,675.3 km^{2}), 113 nature reserve class parks (1,152 km^{2}), 62 waterway class parks (14,446.2 km^{2}), eight wilderness class parks (48,237.5 km^{2}) and five unclassified parks (3494.8 km^{2}).

== See also ==
- List of provincial parks in Ontario
- List of protected areas of Ontario
- List of Canadian protected areas
- Parks Canada
- BC Parks
- National Park Service (United States)
