= List of provincial parks in Ontario =

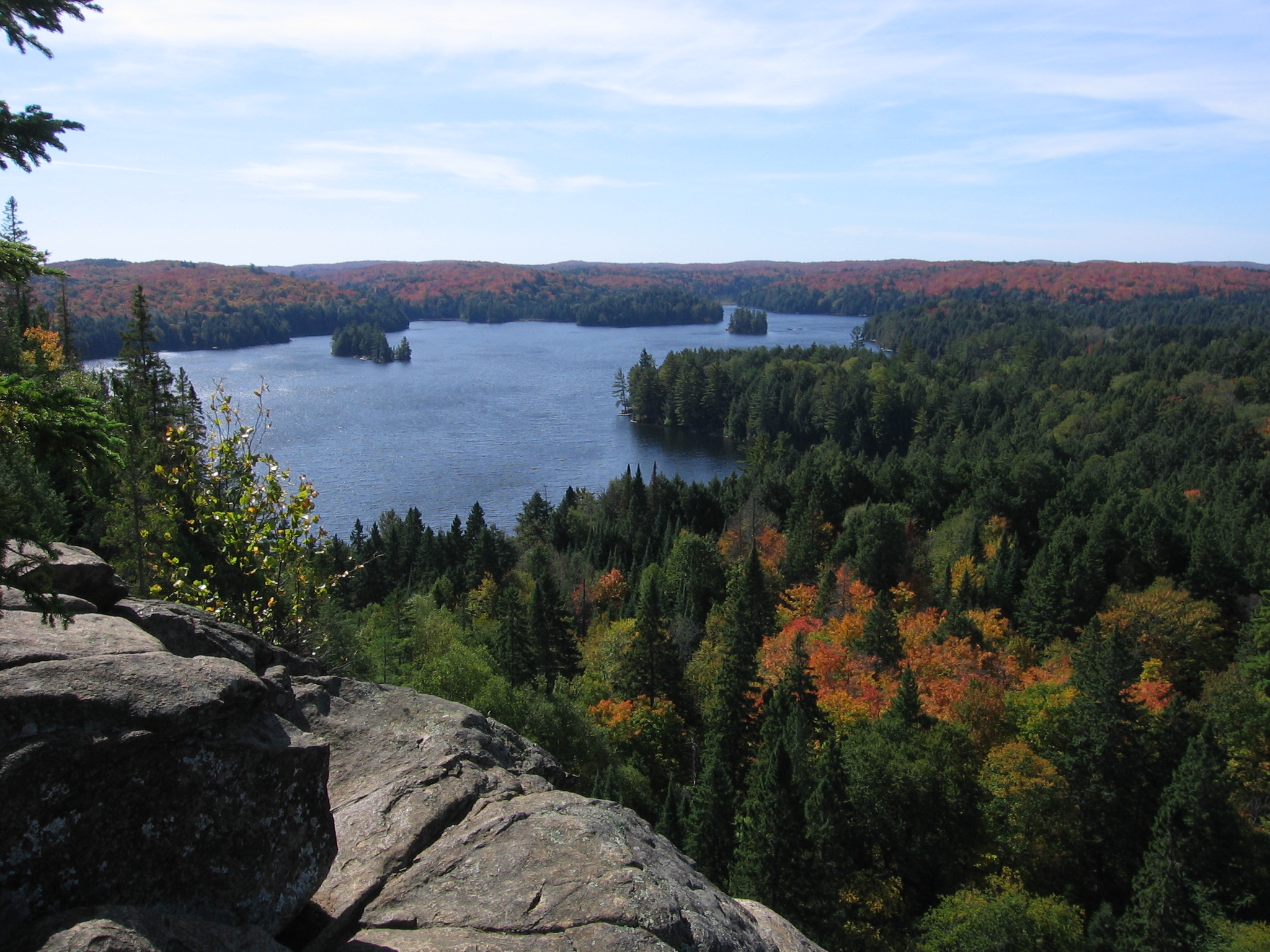
Algonquin Provincial Park, Nipissing District

The Canadian province of Ontario contains more than 300 provincial parks administered by the Government of Ontario through Ontario Parks. Provincial parks are protected areas that range from small plots without facilities such as J. Albert Bauer Provincial Park, to large parks with staffed facilities such as Algonquin Provincial Park.

Ontario's provincial parks vary widely in size and popularity. The largest provincial parks in Ontario are Polar Bear (23,552 km²), Wabakimi (8,921 km²), and Algonquin (7,723 km²). Three provincial parks saw over 1 million visitors in 2025, namely Wasaga Beach (1,303,621), Algonquin (1,254,837), and Sandbanks (1,065,352).

== Provincial parks ==
Legend
* Green – UNESCO designated World Heritage Sites (WHS)
† Blue – UNESCO designated Biosphere Reserves (BR)

Name	Photo	Region	District	Established	Visitors (2025) (Note: Parks Ontario only publishes visitor data for 113 of the parks in 2025, with 4 (The Shoals, Sibbald Point, Pigeon River, and James N. Allan) left blank. The number provided is the sum of day visitations and camper nights, with 268,300 day visitations left "unassigned")	Coordinates
Darlington		Golden Horseshoe	Durham	1959	209,255	43.8717°N 78.7786°W
Bronte Creek		Golden Horseshoe	Halton	1975	349,102	43.4139°N 79.7667°W
Short Hills		Golden Horseshoe	Niagara	1985		43.112°N 79.2656°W
Forks of the Credit		Golden Horseshoe	Peel	1985	47,338	43.816°N 80.012°W
Duclos Point		Golden Horseshoe		1985		44.3330°N 79.2392°W
Holland Landing Prairie		Golden Horseshoe		1994		44.121259°N 79.490615°W
Sibbald Point		Golden Horseshoe	York	1957	419,194	44.327°N 79.322°W
Frontenac Provincial Park		Eastern	Frontenac	1974	50,593	44.5333°N 76.4833°W
Sharbot Lake Provincial Park		Eastern	Frontenac	1958	56,437	44.775°N 76.7231°W
Murphys Point Provincial Park		Eastern	Lanark	1967	74,534	44.7667°N 76.2167°W
Silver Lake Provincial Park		Eastern	Lanark	1958	52,606	44.8306°N 76.5778°W
Bon Echo Provincial Park		Eastern	Lennox and Addington	1965	255,861	44.9039°N 77.255°W
Puzzle Lake Provincial Park		Eastern		2001		44.588611111111°N 76.953055555556°W
Burnt Lands Provincial Park		Eastern	Ottawa and Lanark	2003		45.264578°N 76.156477°W
Fitzroy Provincial Park		Eastern	Ottawa	1963	108,662	45.482611111111°N 76.217869444444°W
Rideau River Provincial Park		Eastern		1963	85,422	45.059166666667°N 75.671111111111°W
Alexander Stewart Provincial Park		Eastern	Renfrew	2003		45.4303°N 76.4989°W
Barron River Provincial Park		Eastern	Nipissing and Renfrew	2006		45.866673°N 77.472386°W
Bell Bay Provincial Park		Eastern	Renfrew	1989		45.499166666667°N 77.853055555556°W
Bissett Creek Provincial Park		Eastern		2006		46.160136°N 78.13688°W
Bonnechere Provincial Park		Eastern	Renfrew	1967	67,994	45.659°N 77.573°W
Bonnechere River Provincial Park		Eastern		1989		45.67°N 77.69°W
Carson Lake Provincial Park		Eastern		1971		45.502777777778°N 77.746388888889°W
Centennial Lake Provincial Nature Reserve		Eastern	Renfrew	1989		45.235555555556°N 76.990833333333°W
Driftwood Provincial Park		Eastern	Renfrew	1963	28,216	46.19°N 77.8583°W
Foy Property Provincial Park		Eastern	Renfrew	1985		45.6504°N 77.5089°W
Grant's Creek Provincial Park		Eastern		2006		46.151583°N 77.999357°W
Lower Madawaska River Provincial Park		Eastern	Renfrew	1989		45.235°N 77.3547°W
Matawatchan Provincial Park		Eastern		1968		45.12936°N 77.14336°W
Ottawa River Provincial Park		Eastern	Renfrew	1989		45.715277777778°N 76.72°W
Petawawa Terrace Provincial Park		Eastern		2006		45.890064°N 77.239422°W
Westmeath Provincial Park		Eastern	Renfrew	1985		45.795°N 76.9097°W
Charleston Lake Provincial Park		Eastern	Leeds and Grenville	1972	143,879	44.5028°N 76.0406°W
Voyageur Provincial Park		Eastern	Prescott and Russell	1966	157,968	45.5547°N 74.4533°W
DuPont Provincial Nature Reserve		Eastern		2011		44.923611111111°N 75.151111111111°W
Black Creek Provincial Park		Southwest	Bruce	1989		44.973333333333°N 81.363611111111°W
Cabot Head Provincial Nature Reserve		Southwest	Bruce	1985		45.209722222222°N 81.448611111111°W
Hope Bay Forest Provincial Nature Reserve		Southwest	Bruce	1985		44.92306°N 81.15572°W
Inverhuron Provincial Park		Southwest	Bruce	1967	154,217	44.2997°N 81.5881°W
Ira Lake Provincial Nature Reserve		Southwest	Bruce	1989		45.039995°N 81.364884°W
Johnston Harbour-Pine Tree Point Provincial Nature Reserve		Southwest	Bruce	1989		45.107537°N 81.514344°W
Lion's Head Provincial Park		Southwest	Bruce	1985		44.997°N 81.201°W
Little Cove Provincial Nature Reserve		Southwest	Bruce	1985		45.247222222222°N 81.612222222222°W
MacGregor Point Provincial Park		Southwest	Bruce	1975	232,007	44.4086°N 81.4458°W
Sauble Falls Provincial Park		Southwest	Bruce	1971	113,759	44.6756°N 81.2567°W
Smokey Head/White Bluff Provincial Nature Reserve		Southwest	Bruce	1985		45.000555555556°N 81.220277777778°W
Clear Creek Forest Provincial Park		Southwest	Chatham-Kent	2014		42.472314°N 81.723261°W
Rondeau Provincial Park		Southwest	Chatham-Kent	1894	263,020	42.2833°N 81.8667°W
Wheatley Provincial Park		Southwest	Chatham-Kent	1971	137,563	42.09°N 82.4472°W
John E. Pearce Provincial Park		Southwest	Elgin	1957	45,969	42.60806°N 81.44667°W
Port Bruce Provincial Park		Southwest	Elgin	1974	2,310	42.655°N 81.013°W
Port Burwell Provincial Park (formerly Iroquois Beach Provincial Park 1971-1986)		Southwest	Elgin	1971	210,621	42.6481°N 80.816°W
East Sister Island Provincial Nature Reserve		Southwest	Essex			41.81317°N 82.85576°W
Fish Point Provincial Nature Reserve		Southwest	Essex	1985		41.7376°N 82.67139°W
Lighthouse Point Provincial Nature Reserve		Southwest	Essex	1985		41.8255°N 82.63928°W
Ojibway Prairie Provincial Nature Reserve		Southwest	Essex	1977		42.2655556°N 83.0766666°W
Bayview Escarpment Provincial Nature Reserve		Southwest	Grey	1985		44.636666666667°N 80.710833333333°W
Craigleith Provincial Park		Southwest	Grey	1967	72,555	44.5367°N 80.3486°W
Duncan Escarpment Provincial Nature Reserve		Southwest	Grey	1985		44.416944444444°N 80.466111111111°W
Pretty River Valley Provincial Park		Southwest	Grey	1985		44.426666666667°N 80.290277777778°W
James N. Allan Provincial Park		Southwest	Haldimand	1989		42.84948°N 79.663466°W
Rock Point Provincial Park		Southwest	Haldimand	1957	94,803	42.8482°N 79.5525°W
Selkirk Provincial Park		Southwest	Haldimand	1967	56,580	42.813889°N 79.95889°W
Morris Tract Provincial Nature Reserve		Southwest	Huron	1997		43.726944444444°N 81.643333333333°W
Point Farms Provincial Park		Southwest	Huron	1970	126,884	43.805°N 81.717222222222°W
The Pinery Provincial Park		Southwest	Lambton	1957	823,352	43.26°N 81.8278°W
Komoka Provincial Park		Southwest	Middlesex	1989	19,800	42.95°N 81.3975°W
Long Point Provincial Park †		Southwest	Norfolk	1921	234,712	42.58°N 80.385°W
Turkey Point Provincial Park		Southwest	Norfolk	1959	160,595	42.7047°N 80.3333°W
Trillium Woods Provincial Park		Southwest	Oxford	1969		43.06377°N 80.77787°W
Algoma Headwaters		Northeastern	Algoma	2003		47.136605°N 83.610633°W
Aubinadong River		Northeastern	Algoma	2002		47.057604°N 83.323842°W
Aubinadong-Nushatogaini Rivers		Northeastern	Algoma	2003		47.092433°N 83.503435°W
Aubrey Falls		Northeastern	Algoma	1985		46.953888888889°N 83.168611111111°W
Batchawana Bay		Northeastern	Algoma	1973	7,739	46.9425°N 84.5581°W
Batchawana River		Northeastern	Algoma	2004		47.133791°N 84.415006°W
Blind River		Northeastern	Algoma	2002		46.50681°N 82.932271°W
Goulais River		Northeastern	Algoma	2003		46.997313°N 83.912727°W
Lake Superior		Northeastern	Algoma	1944	97,327	47.5967°N 84.7414°W
Little White River		Northeastern	Algoma	2002		46.561848°N 83.041987°W
Matinenda		Northeastern	Algoma	2003		46.357235°N 82.935393°W
Michipicoten		Northeastern	Algoma	1982		47.925277777778°N 84.8375°W
Mississagi Delta		Northeastern	Algoma	1985		46.169°N 83.07032°W
Mississagi		Northeastern	Algoma	1973	20,935	46.5881°N 82.6881°W
Montreal River		Northeastern	Algoma	1968		47.21986°N 84.6542°W
Nagagami Lake		Northeastern	Algoma	1985	33,759	49.4336111°N 84.9694444°W
Nagagamisis		Northeastern	Algoma	1957		49.44444444°N 84.64444444°W
Nimoosh		Northeastern	Algoma	2002		48.027671°N 85.210633°W
North Channel Inshore		Northeastern	Algoma	2002		46.195705°N 83.078472°W
Obatanga		Northeastern	Algoma	1967		48.323611111111°N 85.092777777778°W
Pancake Bay		Northeastern	Algoma	1968	112,884	46.9667°N 84.6833°W
Pichogen River		Northeastern	Algoma	2003		48.936206°N 83.987821°W
Pokei Lake/White River Wetlands		Northeastern	Algoma	2000		48.485143°N 85.239244°W
Potholes		Northeastern	Algoma	1985	1,590	47.9532°N 84.26223°W
River Aux Sables		Northeastern	Algoma	2006		46.453055555556°N 82.18°W
Sandy Islands		Northeastern	Algoma	2001		46.8167°N 84.65°W
Abitibi-De-Troyes Provincial Park		Northeastern	Cochrane	1985		48.790555555556°N 80.033888888889°W
Adam Creek Provincial Nature Reserve		Northeastern	Cochrane	1985		50.2372222°N 82.0991666°W
Coral Rapids Provincial Nature Reserve		Northeastern	Cochrane	1985		50.2422222°N 81.6666666°W
Dana-Jowsey Lakes Provincial Park		Northeastern	Cochrane	1989		48.345277777778°N 81.8025°W
Esker Lakes Provincial Park		Northeastern	Cochrane	1957	29,882	48.320277777778°N 79.8775°W
Frederick House Lake Provincial Nature Reserve		Northeastern	Cochrane	1985		48.68191°N 80.9649°W
Fushimi Lake Provincial Park		Northeastern	Cochrane	1979	18,630	49.82°N 83.917222222222°W
Greenwater Provincial Park		Northeastern	Cochrane	1957		49.215°N 81.2825°W
Groundhog River Waterway Provincial Park		Northeastern	Cochrane	2006		49.057904°N 82.122609°W
Hicks-Oke Bog Provincial Nature Reserve		Northeastern	Cochrane	1994		48.906771°N 82.077344°W
Kesagami Provincial Park		Northeastern	Cochrane	1983		50.331944444444°N 80.2675°W
Kettle Lakes Provincial Park		Northeastern	Cochrane	1957	44,898	48.57°N 80.87°W
Lake Abitibi Islands Provincial Park		Northeastern	Cochrane	2005		48.761834°N 79.922836°W
Little Abitibi Provincial Park		Northeastern	Cochrane	1985		49.53°N 80.78°W
Little Current River Provincial Park		Northeastern	Cochrane	1989		50.715555555556°N 86.184444444444°W
Mattagami River Beach and Aeolian Deposit Provincial Park		Northeastern	Cochrane	2003		50.095662°N 82.200572°W
North Driftwood River Provincial Nature Reserve		Northeastern	Cochrane	1985		49.36609°N 81.31062°W
Pushkin Hills Provincial Nature Reserve		Northeastern	Cochrane	1985		48.2944445°N 79.6733333°W
René Brunelle Provincial Park		Northeastern	Cochrane	1957	25,499	49.417357°N 82.139301°W
Sextant Rapids Provincial Nature Reserve		Northeastern	Cochrane	1985		50.2027778°N 81.6463889°W
Shallow River Provincial Nature Reserve		Northeastern	Cochrane	1985		48.64072°N 80.53287°W
Thackeray Provincial Nature Reserve		Northeastern	Cochrane	1985		48.4483334°N 79.9219444°W
Tidewater Provincial Park		Northeastern	Cochrane	1970	199	51.2625°N 80.625°W
Wildgoose Outwash Deposit Provincial Park		Northeastern	Cochrane	2002		48.389012°N 80.434952°W
Williams Island Provincial Nature Reserve		Northeastern	Cochrane	1985		50.39958°N 81.57°W
Aaron Provincial Park		Northwestern	Kenora	1958		49.7617°N 92.6565°W
Albany River Provincial Park		Northwestern	Kenora	1989		51.3625°N 87.775°W
Beekahncheekahmeeng Deebahncheekayweehn Eenahohnahnuhn		Northwestern	Kenora	2011		51.767°N 93.673°W
Blue Lake Provincial Park		Northwestern	Kenora	1990	52,598	49.8933°N 93.5414°W
Bonheur River Kame Provincial Nature Reserve		Northwestern	Kenora	1985		49.3994°N 91.2336°W
Butler Lake Provincial Nature Reserve		Northwestern	Kenora	1985		49.6947222°N 92.72°W
Eagle-Dogtooth Provincial Park		Northwestern	Kenora	2003		49.749005°N 93.720997°W
East English River Provincial Park		Northwestern	Kenora	2003		49.774002°N 91.486998°W
Fawn River Provincial Park		Northwestern	Kenora	1989		53.8325°N 89.544166666667°W
Kahnahmaykoosayseekahk		Northwestern	Kenora	2011		51.31513°N 94.134987°W
Lake of the Woods Provincial Park		Northwestern	Kenora	1967		49.028055555556°N 94.630277777778°W
Lola Lake Provincial Nature Reserve		Northwestern	Kenora	1985		49.81542°N 92.54491°W
Maynard Lake Provincial Nature Reserve		Northwestern	Kenora	1997		50.371944444444°N 93.878888888889°W
Minnitaki Kames Provincial Park		Northwestern	Kenora	1989		49.9°N 91.8667°W
Ojibway Provincial Park		Northwestern	Kenora	1963	12,589	49.995°N 92.1325°W
Opasquia Provincial Park		Northwestern	Kenora	1983		53.5333°N 93.0833°W
Otoskwin-Attawapiskat River Provincial Park		Northwestern	Kenora	1989		52.171388888889°N 87.583888888889°W
Pahngwahshahshk Ohweemushkeeg		Northwestern	Kenora	2011		52.125°N 93.293°W
Pakwash Provincial Park		Northwestern	Kenora	1967	9,340	50.784°N 93.445°W
Pipestone River Provincial Park		Northwestern	Kenora	1989		52.288611111111°N 90.5175°W
Polar Bear Provincial Park		Northwestern	Kenora	1970		54.7617°N 83.0388°W
Rushing River Provincial Park		Northwestern	Kenora	1958	88,090	49.6816°N 94.2359°W
Sahkeesuhkuh Weesuhkaheegahn		Northwestern	Kenora	2011		51.553779°N 93.477173°W
Sandbar Lake Provincial Park		Northwestern	Kenora	1970	16,598	49.494°N 91.574°W
Severn River Provincial Park		Northwestern	Kenora	1989		54.130555555556°N 90.594166666667°W
Sioux Narrows Provincial Park		Northwestern	Kenora	1957	17,007	49.424166666667°N 94.05°W
Tide Lake Provincial Nature Reserve		Northwestern	Kenora	1997		50.319564°N 93.994071°W
Trout Lake Provincial Nature Reserve		Northwestern	Kenora	1989		51.14121°N 93.45567°W
Turtle River-White Otter Lake Provincial Park		Northwestern	Kenora	1989		49.208333333333°N 92.120833333333°W
Weeskayjahk Ohtahzhoganeeng		Northwestern	Kenora	2011		51.689°N 94.494°W
West English River Provincial Park		Northwestern	Kenora	2003		50.428491°N 93.876086°W
Windigo Point Provincial Nature Reserve		Northwestern	Kenora	1989		50.378139°N 92.735736°W
Winisk River Provincial Park		Northwestern	Kenora	1969		53.169444°N 87.475°W
Winnange Lake Provincial Park		Northwestern	Kenora	1985		49.781944444444°N 93.681388888889°W
Woodland Caribou Provincial Park *		Northwestern	Kenora	1983	2,720	51.0667°N 94.85°W
Daisy Lake Uplands Provincial Park		Northeastern	Sudbury	2006		46.460077°N 80.880399°W
Fairbank Provincial Park		Northeastern	Sudbury	1957	34,164	46.471944444444°N 81.441111111111°W
Blue Jay Creek Provincial Park		Northeastern	Manitoulin	1997		45.595°N 82.08°W
Misery Bay Provincial Nature Reserve		Northeastern	Manitoulin	1989	3,731	45.789777°N 82.721606°W
Queen Elizabeth The Queen Mother Mnidoo Mnissing Provincial Park		Northeastern	Manitoulin	2014		45.864537°N 82.974586°W
Alexander Lake Forest Provincial Park		Northeastern	Nipissing	2003		46.460286°N 78.9198°W
Algonquin Provincial Park		Northeastern	Nipissing	1893-05-23	1,254,837	45.8°N 78.7°W
Amable du Fond River Provincial Park		Northeastern	Nipissing	2003		46.178646°N 78.917395°W
Finlayson Point Provincial Park		Northeastern	Nipissing	1963	24,496	47.0553°N 79.8047°W
Jocko Rivers Provincial Park		Northeastern	Nipissing	2003		46.648932°N 79.269415°W
Kenny Forest Provincial Park		Northeastern	Nipissing	1994		46.725833333333°N 79.6925°W
Manitou Islands Provincial Nature Reserve		Northeastern	Nipissing	1989		46.266034°N 79.581236°W
Marten River Provincial Park		Northeastern	Nipissing	1990	45,080	46.7236°N 79.8145°W
Mattawa River Provincial Park		Northeastern	Nipissing	1970		46.312619444444°N 79.093138888889°W
Opeongo River Provincial Park		Northeastern	Nipissing	1990		45.5817°N 77.8942°W
Samuel de Champlain Provincial Park		Northeastern	Nipissing	1990	7,263	46.291666666667°N 78.875°W
Temagami River Provincial Park		Northeastern	Nipissing	2000		46.687222222222°N 79.995°W
Upper Madawaska River Provincial Park		Northeastern	Nipissing	1989		45.4933°N 78.0986°W
West Sandy Island Provincial Nature Reserve		Northeastern	Nipissing	1994		46.237741°N 79.914541°W
Widdifield Forest Provincial Park		Northeastern	Nipissing	2002		46.447321°N 79.325333°W
French River Provincial Park		Central	Parry Sound	1989	26,109	45.965555555556°N 80.870833333333°W
Grundy Lake Provincial Park		Central	Parry Sound	1959	164,409	45.933333333333°N 80.55°W
Killbear Provincial Park		Central	Parry Sound	1960	442,469	45.3597°N 80.2197°W
Limestone Islands Provincial Nature Reserve		Central	Parry Sound	1980		45.39072°N 80.53233°W
Magnetawan River Provincial Park		Central	Parry Sound	2003		45.6333°N 80°W
Mikisew Provincial Park		Central	Parry Sound	1964	83,143	45.821944444444°N 79.511388888889°W
Noganosh Lake Provincial Park		Central	Parry Sound	2003		45.822268°N 80.229604°W
Oastler Lake Provincial Park		Central	Parry Sound	1967	59,876	45.3107°N 79.9634°W
Restoule Provincial Park		Central	Parry Sound	1963	97,978	46.0672°N 79.7733°W
Round Lake Provincial Nature Reserve		Central	Parry Sound	1989		45.516944444444°N 80.174444444444°W
South Bay Provincial Park		Central	Parry Sound	1985		46.126666666667°N 79.606666666667°W
Sturgeon Bay Provincial Park		Central	Parry Sound	1960	23,814	45.623611111111°N 80.415277777778°W
The Massasauga Provincial Park		Central	Parry Sound	1989	32,184	45.226°N 80.056°W
Agassiz Peatlands Provincial Park		Northwestern	Rainy River	1985		48.8689°N 94.51808°W
Caliper Lake Provincial Park		Northwestern	Rainy River	1960	9,854	49.061°N 93.913°W
Cranberry Lake Provincial Nature Reserve		Northwestern	Rainy River	1985		48.86045°N 94.35803°W
Goose Island Provincial Park		Northwestern	Rainy River	2008		48.665733°N 93.164577°W
Quetico Provincial Park		Northwestern	Rainy River	1913	73,509	48.3964°N 91.5353°W
Sable Islands Nature Reserve		Northwestern	Rainy River	1985		48.91491°N 94.63967°W
Sandpoint Island Provincial Park		Northwestern	Rainy River	1985		48.63833°N 93.10889°W
Spruce Islands Provincial Park		Northwestern	Rainy River	1985		48.79572°N 94.27228°W
Biscotasi Lake Provincial Park		Northeastern	Sudbury	1989		47.365277777778°N 82.075°W
Chapleau-Nemegosenda River Provincial Park		Northeastern	Sudbury	1973		48.278055555556°N 83.161111111111°W
Chiniguchi River Waterway Provincial Park		Northeastern	Sudbury	2006		46.822369°N 80.501442°W
Chutes Provincial Park		Northeastern	Sudbury	1970	50,974	46.2219°N 82.0719°W
Five Mile Lake Provincial Park		Northeastern	Sudbury	1958		47.573611111111°N 83.23°W
Grassy River-Mond Lake Lowlands and Ferris Lake Uplands Provincial Park		Northeastern	Sudbury	2005	47,813	47.823055555556°N 81.163611111111°W
Halfway Lake Provincial Park		Northeastern	Sudbury	1985	80,691	46.9108°N 81.6531°W
Ivanhoe Lake Provincial Park		Northeastern	Sudbury	1957	28,872	48.1492°N 82.5119°W
Killarney Lakelands and Headwaters Provincial Park		Northeastern	Sudbury	2006		46.236944444444°N 81.402222222222°W
Killarney Provincial Park		Northeastern	Sudbury	1964	189,899	46.0833°N 81.3333°W
La Cloche Provincial Park		Northeastern	Sudbury	1985		46.110277777778°N 82.030277777778°W
La Motte Lake Provincial Park		Northeastern	Sudbury	1989		47.736111111111°N 81.653333333333°W
MacMurchy Township End Moraine Provincial Park		Northeastern	Sudbury	2002		47.601144°N 81.137036°W
Mashkinonje Provincial Park		Northeastern	Sudbury	1963		46.256111111111°N 80.329444444444°W
Missinaibi Provincial Park		Northeastern	Sudbury	1970	11,994	48.354166°N 83.67°W
Mississagi River Provincial Park		Northeastern	Sudbury	1974		47.1506°N 82.5239°W
Obabika River Provincial Park		Northeastern	Sudbury	1989		47.216111111111°N 80.281666666667°W
Rushbrook Provincial Park		Northeastern	Sudbury	2006		46.72978°N 81.944392°W
Solace Provincial Park		Northeastern	Sudbury	1989		47.188888888889°N 80.690277777778°W
Spanish River Provincial Park		Northeastern	Sudbury	2001	2,703	46.875555555556°N 81.774166666667°W
Sturgeon River Provincial Park		Northeastern	Sudbury	1989		47.1°N 80.6667°W
The Shoals Provincial Park		Northeastern	Sudbury	1970		47.835277777778°N 83.850277777778°W
Wakami Lake Provincial Park		Northeastern	Sudbury	1973	12,586	47.488888888889°N 82.832777777778°W
Wanapitei Provincial Park		Northeastern	Sudbury	1985		46.805833333333°N 80.710833333333°W
Wenebegon River Provincial Park		Northeastern	Sudbury	2003		47.288772°N 83.036294°W
Windy Lake Provincial Park		Northeastern	Sudbury	1959	53,764	46.619166666667°N 81.447777777778°W
Woman River Forest Provincial Park		Northeastern	Sudbury	2003		47.474042°N 82.685256°W
Albert Lake Mesa Provincial Nature Reserve		Northwestern	Thunder Bay	1985		49.0919444°N 88.9788889°W
Arrow Lake Provincial Park		Northwestern	Thunder Bay	1957	14,331	48.17833333°N 90.225556°W
Arrowhead Peninsula Provincial Nature Reserve		Northwestern	Thunder Bay	1985		48.2538889°N 90.6686111°W
Black Sturgeon River Provincial Park		Northwestern	Thunder Bay	2002		49.166666666667°N 88.625°W
Brightsand River Provincial Park		Northwestern	Thunder Bay	1989		49.805277777778°N 90.282777777778°W
Castle Creek Provincial Nature Reserve		Northwestern	Thunder Bay	1985		48.1947222°N 90.0616666°W
Cavern Lake Provincial Nature Reserve		Northwestern	Thunder Bay	1975		48.8411111°N 88.6847222°W
Craig's Pit Provincial Nature Reserve		Northwestern	Thunder Bay	1985		48.6886111°N 86.3391667°W
Devon Road Mesa Provincial Nature Reserve		Northwestern	Thunder Bay	1985		48.0497222°N 89.6686111°W
Divide Ridge Provincial Nature Reserve		Northwestern	Thunder Bay	1985		48.263009°N 89.976987°W
Edward Island Provincial Nature Reserve		Northwestern	Thunder Bay	1985		48.3808333°N 88.635°W
Fraleigh Lake Provincial Nature Reserve		Northwestern	Thunder Bay	1985		48.1983333°N 89.8502778°W
Gravel River Provincial Nature Reserve		Northwestern	Thunder Bay	1985		48.92143°N 87.75873°W
Gull River Provincial Park		Northwestern	Thunder Bay	2003		49.694718°N 89.441992°W
Kabitotikwia River Provincial Nature Reserve		Northwestern	Thunder Bay	1985		49.6980556°N 89.0719444°W
Kaiashk Provincial Nature Reserve		Northwestern	Thunder Bay	1989		49.546658°N 89.430504°W
Kakabeka Falls Provincial Park		Northwestern	Thunder Bay	1957	181,913	48.398611111111°N 89.626666666667°W
Kama Hills Provincial Nature Reserve		Northwestern	Thunder Bay	1985		49.01212°N 88.00619°W
Kashabowie Provincial Park		Northwestern	Thunder Bay	1985		48.691111111111°N 90.347222222222°W
Kopka River Provincial Park		Northwestern	Thunder Bay	1989		50.166666666667°N 89.499166666667°W
La Verendrye Provincial Park		Northwestern	Thunder Bay	1989		48.1042°N 90.3672°W
Lake Nipigon Provincial Park		Northwestern	Thunder Bay	1960		49.4833°N 88.1333°W
Le Pate Provincial Nature Reserve		Northwestern	Thunder Bay			48.23261°N 89.15721°W
Little Greenwater Lake Provincial Nature Reserve		Northwestern	Thunder Bay	1985		48.5486111°N 90.4377778°W
Livingstone Point Provincial Nature Reserve		Northwestern	Thunder Bay	1985		49.911666666667°N 88.129444444444°W
MacLeod Provincial Park		Northwestern	Thunder Bay	1963	20,805	49.689444444444°N 86.898611111111°W
Matawin River Provincial Nature Reserve		Northwestern	Thunder Bay	1985		48.389166666667°N 90.169722222222°W
Michipicoten Island Provincial Park		Northwestern	Thunder Bay	1985		47.751111194444°N 85.776666611111°W
Nakina Moraine Provincial Park		Northwestern	Thunder Bay	1994		50.116666666667°N 86.7°W
Neys Provincial Park		Northwestern	Thunder Bay	1965	44,497	48.75°N 86.5833°W
Obonga-Ottertooth Provincial Park		Northwestern	Thunder Bay	2003		49.883956°N 89.631705°W
Ogoki River Provincial Park		Northwestern	Thunder Bay	2004		50.826682°N 87.232234°W
Ouimet Canyon Provincial Park		Northwestern	Thunder Bay	1972	14,861	48.788888888889°N 88.669443888889°W
Pan Lake Fen Provincial Park		Northwestern	Thunder Bay	2000		48.834152°N 85.978901°W
Pantagruel Creek Provincial Nature Reserve		Northwestern	Thunder Bay	1989		49.754444444444°N 89.554444444444°W
Pigeon River Provincial Park		Northwestern	Thunder Bay	1960		48.0166°N 89.58704°W
Porphyry Island Provincial Park		Northwestern	Thunder Bay	1968		48.3511°N 88.6353°W
Prairie River Mouth Provincial Nature Reserve		Northwestern	Thunder Bay	1985		48.788888888889°N 86.786666666667°W
Puff Island Provincial Nature Reserve		Northwestern	Thunder Bay	1985		48.6618°N 88.04322°W
Pukaskwa River Provincial Park		Northwestern	Thunder Bay	2002		48.274959°N 85.39884°W
Rainbow Falls Provincial Park		Northwestern	Thunder Bay	1963	47,539	48.8422°N 87.3953°W
Red Sucker Point Provincial Nature Reserve		Northwestern	Thunder Bay	1985		48.77044°N 86.4705°W
Ruby Lake Provincial Park		Northwestern	Thunder Bay	2002		48.989444444444°N 88.177777777778°W
Schreiber Channel Provincial Nature Reserve		Northwestern	Thunder Bay	1979		48.79932°N 87.34681°W
Sedgman Lake Provincial Park		Northwestern	Thunder Bay	1985		50.636°N 87.697°W
Shesheeb Bay Provincial Nature Reserve		Northwestern	Thunder Bay	1985		48.5936111°N 88.2719445°W
Silver Falls Provincial Park		Northwestern	Thunder Bay	1985	20,868	48.687777777778°N 89.613333333333°W
Slate Islands Provincial Park		Northwestern	Thunder Bay	1985		48.658888888889°N 87.003333333333°W
Sleeping Giant Provincial Park		Northwestern	Thunder Bay	1944	108,005	48.3372°N 88.9044°W
St. Raphael Provincial Park		Northwestern	Thunder Bay	2003		50.7671°N 90.901667°W
Steel River Provincial Park		Northwestern	Thunder Bay	1989		49.329722222222°N 86.714722222222°W
Thompson Island Provincial Nature Reserve		Northwestern	Thunder Bay	1985		48.16291°N 89.17322°W
Wabakimi Provincial Park		Northwestern	Thunder Bay	1983	5,436	50.76°N 89.5408°W
West Bay Provincial Nature Reserve		Northwestern	Thunder Bay	1985		49.90872°N 88.93005°W
White Lake Peatlands Provincial Nature Reserve		Northwestern	Thunder Bay	1997		48.864701°N 85.559864°W
White Lake Provincial Park		Northwestern	Thunder Bay	1963	33,692	48.7194°N 85.6444°W
Whitesand Provincial Park		Northwestern	Thunder Bay	2003		50.455535°N 88.686939°W
Windigo Bay Provincial Nature Reserve		Northwestern	Thunder Bay	1989		50.239722222222°N 88.812777777778°W
Englehart River Fine Sand Plain and Waterway Provincial Park		Northeastern	Timiskaming	2002		47.878333333333°N 80.208888888889°W
Gem Lake Maple Bedrock Provincial Park		Northeastern	Timiskaming	2002		48.163333333333°N 79.666111111111°W
Kap-Kig-Iwan Provincial Park		Northeastern	Timiskaming	1957	14,562	47.79611111°N 79.88694444°W
Lady Evelyn-Smoothwater Provincial Park		Northeastern	Timiskaming	1973	17,552	47.2333°N 80.2667°W
Larder River Waterway Provincial Park		Northeastern	Timiskaming	1985		47.9725°N 79.626944444444°W
Makobe-Grays River Provincial Park		Northeastern	Timiskaming	1985		47.626111111111°N 80.393888888889°W
W.J.B. Greenwood Provincial Park		Northeastern	Timiskaming	1985		47.3081°N 79.8131°W
West Montreal River Provincial Park		Northeastern	Timiskaming	2002		48.0325°N 80.687222222222°W
Boyne Valley Provincial Park		Central	Dufferin	1985		44.111666666667°N 80.109444444444°W
Hockley Valley Provincial Nature Reserve		Central	Dufferin	1989		43.985°N 80.0622°W
Mono Cliffs Provincial Park		Central	Dufferin	1985	75,467	44.0467°N 80.0769°W
Dividing Lake Provincial Park		Central	Haliburton	1985		45.403611111111°N 78.609166666667°W
Silent Lake Provincial Park		Central	Haliburton	1977	108,579	44.9208°N 78.0697°W
Egan Chutes Provincial Nature Reserve		Central	Hastings	1989		45.080371°N 77.739862°W
Lake St. Peter Provincial Park		Central	Hastings	1971	25,080	45.3197°N 78.0214°W
Menzel Centennial Provincial Nature Reserve		Central	Hastings	1997		44.358382°N 77.125391°W
Stoco Fen Provincial Nature Reserve		Central	Hastings	1985		44.4619445°N 77.23°W
Balsam Lake Provincial Park		Central	Kawartha Lakes	1968	173,634	44.6328°N 78.8746°W
Emily Provincial Park		Central	Kawartha Lakes	1957	113,167	44.3375°N 78.535°W
Indian Point Provincial Park		Central	Kawartha Lakes	1989		44.634444444444°N 78.823611111111°W
Queen Elizabeth II Wildlands Provincial Park		Central	Kawartha Lakes	2002		44.8333°N 78.9333°W
Ferris Provincial Park		Central	Northumberland	1971		44.291944444444°N 77.793888888889°W
Peter's Woods Provincial Nature Reserve		Central	Northumberland	1976		44.1286111°N 78.0402778°W
Presqu'ile Provincial Park		Central	Northumberland	1922	466,364	43.9939°N 77.7131°W
Arrowhead Provincial Park		Central	Muskoka	1971	356,236	45.3917°N 79.1986°W
Big East River Provincial Park		Central	Muskoka	2000		45.468055555556°N 79.082777777778°W
Bigwind Lake Provincial Park		Central	Muskoka	1985		45.070833333333°N 79.023888888889°W
Gibson River Provincial Park		Central	Muskoka	1968		44.93996°N 79.69985°W
Hardy Lake Provincial Park		Central	Muskoka	1985		45.011111111111°N 79.524444444444°W
J. Albert Bauer Provincial Park		Central	Muskoka	1985		45.4053°N 79.0197°W
O'Donnell Point Provincial Nature Reserve		Central	Muskoka	1985		45.08162°N 80.04767°W
Oxtongue River-Ragged Falls Provincial Park		Central	Muskoka	1985	4,721	45.411944444444°N 78.894444444444°W
Six Mile Lake Provincial Park		Central	Muskoka	1958	78,339	44.899°N 79.758°W
Kawartha Highlands Provincial Park		Central	Peterborough	1989	37,299	44.75°N 78.25°W
Mark S. Burnham Provincial Park		Central	Peterborough	1955	1,243	44.3°N 78.269166666667°W
Petroglyphs Provincial Park		Central	Peterborough	1981	22,224	44.6152°N 78.0408°W
Quackenbush Provincial Park		Central	Peterborough	1985		44.561111111111°N 78.001944444444°W
Serpent Mounds Provincial Park		Central	Peterborough	1957		44.209166666667°N 78.154722222222°W
Wolf Island Provincial Park		Central	Peterborough	1985		44.562777777778°N 78.250555555556°W
Lake on the Mountain Provincial Park		Central	Prince Edward	1957	8,538	44.034°N 77.059°W
North Beach Provincial Park		Central	Prince Edward	1970	105,382	43.957777777778°N 77.526944444444°W
Sandbanks Provincial Park		Central	Prince Edward	1990	1,065,352	43.9°N 77.2667°W
Timber Island Provincial Nature Reserve		Central	Prince Edward	1985		43.956944444444°N 76.838611111111°W
Awenda Provincial Park		Central	Simcoe	1975	195,412	44.8417°N 79.9891°W
Bass Lake Provincial Park		Central	Simcoe	1957	126,771	44.604444444444°N 79.480833333333°W
Beattie Pinery Provincial Park		Central	Simcoe	1997		44.12405°N 79.859516°W
Devil's Glen Provincial Park		Central	Simcoe	1965		44.360555555556°N 80.2075°W
Earl Rowe Provincial Park		Central	Simcoe	1964	172,691	44.157777777778°N 79.905°W
Mara Provincial Park		Central	Simcoe	1970	77,598	44.587°N 79.36°W
McRae Point Provincial Park		Central	Simcoe	1971	108,523	44.571388888889°N 79.328055555556°W
Noisy River Provincial Nature Reserve		Central	Simcoe	1989		44.270605°N 80.191803°W
Nottawasaga Lookout Provincial Nature Reserve		Central	Simcoe	1994		44.407598°N 80.250629°W
Springwater Provincial Park		Central	Simcoe	1958	877	44.439722222222°N 79.761388888889°W
Wasaga Beach Provincial Park		Central	Simcoe	1959	1,303,621	44.493888888889°N 80.021666666667°W
Waubaushene Beaches Provincial Park		Central	Simcoe	1969		44.74805°N 79.72004°W

== See also ==
- List of provincial parks of Northern Ontario
- List of provincial parks of Central Ontario
- List of provincial parks of Eastern Ontario
- List of provincial parks of Southwestern Ontario
- List of provincial parks of the Golden Horseshoe
