= List of provincial parks of Central Ontario =

This is a list of provincial parks in Central Ontario. These provincial parks are maintained by Ontario Parks. For a list of other provincial parks in Ontario, see the List of provincial parks in Ontario.

== Dufferin County ==
Name	Established	Commons category	Picture	Coordinates
Boyne Valley Provincial Park	1985	Boyne Valley Provincial Park		44.111666666667°N 80.109444444444°W
Hockley Valley Provincial Nature Reserve	1989	Hockley Valley Provincial Nature Reserve		43.985°N 80.0622°W
Mono Cliffs Provincial Park	1985	Mono Cliffs Provincial Park		44.0467°N 80.0769°W

== Haliburton County ==
Name	Established	Picture	Coordinates
Dividing Lake Provincial Park	1985		45.403611111111°N 78.609166666667°W
Silent Lake Provincial Park	1977		44.9208°N 78.0697°W

== Hastings County ==
Name	Established	Picture	Coordinates
Egan Chutes Provincial Nature Reserve	1989		45.080371°N 77.739862°W
Lake St. Peter Provincial Park	1971		45.3197°N 78.0214°W
Menzel Centennial Provincial Nature Reserve	1997		44.358382°N 77.125391°W
Stoco Fen Provincial Nature Reserve	1985		44.4619445°N 77.23°W

== Kawartha Lakes ==
Name	Established	Picture	Coordinates
Balsam Lake Provincial Park	1968		44.6328°N 78.8746°W
Emily Provincial Park	1957		44.3375°N 78.535°W
Indian Point Provincial Park	1989		44.634444444444°N 78.823611111111°W
Queen Elizabeth II Wildlands Provincial Park	2002		44.8333°N 78.9333°W

== Northumberland County ==
Name	Established	Commons category	Picture	Coordinates
Ferris Provincial Park	1971	Ferris Provincial Park		44.291944444444°N 77.793888888889°W
Peter's Woods Provincial Nature Reserve	1976			44.1286111°N 78.0402778°W
Presqu'ile Provincial Park	1922	Presqu'ile Provincial Park		43.9939°N 77.7131°W

== Muskoka District Municipality ==
Name	Established	Commons category	Picture	Coordinates
Arrowhead Provincial Park	1971	Arrowhead Provincial Park		45.3917°N 79.1986°W
Big East River Provincial Park	2000			45.468055555556°N 79.082777777778°W
Bigwind Lake Provincial Park	1985			45.070833333333°N 79.023888888889°W
Gibson River Provincial Park	1968			44.93996°N 79.69985°W
Hardy Lake Provincial Park	1985	Hardy Lake Provincial Park		45.011111111111°N 79.524444444444°W
J. Albert Bauer Provincial Park	1985			45.4053°N 79.0197°W
O'Donnell Point Provincial Nature Reserve	1985			45.08162°N 80.04767°W
Oxtongue River-Ragged Falls Provincial Park	1985	Ragged Falls		45.411944444444°N 78.894444444444°W
Six Mile Lake Provincial Park	1958	Six Mile Lake Provincial Park		44.899°N 79.758°W

== Peterborough County ==
Name	Established	Commons category	Picture	Coordinates
Kawartha Highlands Provincial Park	1989	Kawartha Highlands Provincial Park		44.75°N 78.25°W
Mark S. Burnham Provincial Park	1955			44.3°N 78.269166666667°W
Petroglyphs Provincial Park	1981	Petroglyphs Provincial Park		44.6152°N 78.0408°W
Quackenbush Provincial Park	1985			44.561111111111°N 78.001944444444°W
Serpent Mounds Provincial Park	1957			44.209166666667°N 78.154722222222°W
Wolf Island Provincial Park	1985			44.562777777778°N 78.250555555556°W

== Prince Edward County ==
Name	Established	Picture	Coordinates
Lake on the Mountain Provincial Park	1957		44.034°N 77.059°W
North Beach Provincial Park	1970		43.957777777778°N 77.526944444444°W
Sandbanks Provincial Park	1990		43.9°N 77.2667°W
Timber Island Provincial Nature Reserve	1985		43.956944444444°N 76.838611111111°W

== Simcoe County ==
Name	Established	Commons category	Picture	Coordinates
Awenda Provincial Park	1975	Awenda Provincial Park		44.8417°N 79.9891°W
Bass Lake Provincial Park	1957			44.604444444444°N 79.480833333333°W
Beattie Pinery Provincial Park	1997	Beattie Pinery Provincial Nature Reserve		44.12405°N 79.859516°W
Devil's Glen Provincial Park	1965			44.360555555556°N 80.2075°W
Earl Rowe Provincial Park	1964	Earl Rowe Provincial Park		44.157777777778°N 79.905°W
Mara Provincial Park	1970	Mara Provincial Park		44.587°N 79.36°W
McRae Point Provincial Park	1971			44.571388888889°N 79.328055555556°W
Noisy River Provincial Nature Reserve	1989	Noisy River Provincial Nature Reserve		44.270605°N 80.191803°W
Nottawasaga Lookout Provincial Nature Reserve	1994			44.407598°N 80.250629°W
Springwater Provincial Park	1958			44.439722222222°N 79.761388888889°W
Wasaga Beach Provincial Park	1959			44.493888888889°N 80.021666666667°W
Waubaushene Beaches Provincial Park	1969			44.74805°N 79.72004°W
