= List of provincial parks of Eastern Ontario =

This is a list of provincial parks in Eastern Ontario. These provincial parks are maintained by Ontario Parks. For a list of other provincial parks in Ontario, see the List of provincial parks in Ontario.

Name	Established	Commons category	Picture	Coordinates
Frontenac Provincial Park	1974	Frontenac Provincial Park		44.5333°N 76.4833°W
Sharbot Lake Provincial Park	1958			44.775°N 76.7231°W
Murphys Point Provincial Park	1967	Murphys Point Provincial Park		44.7667°N 76.2167°W
Silver Lake Provincial Park	1958			44.8306°N 76.5778°W
Bon Echo Provincial Park	1965	Bon Echo Provincial Park		44.9039°N 77.255°W
Puzzle Lake Provincial Park	2001			44.588611111111°N 76.953055555556°W
Burnt Lands Provincial Park	2003			45.264578°N 76.156477°W
Fitzroy Provincial Park	1963	Fitzroy Provincial Park		45.482611111111°N 76.217869444444°W
Rideau River Provincial Park	1963			45.059166666667°N 75.671111111111°W
Alexander Stewart Provincial Park	2003			45.4303°N 76.4989°W
Barron River Provincial Park	2006			45.866673°N 77.472386°W
Bell Bay Provincial Park	1989			45.499166666667°N 77.853055555556°W
Bissett Creek Provincial Park	2006			46.160136°N 78.13688°W
Bonnechere Provincial Park	1967	Bonnechere Provincial Park		45.659°N 77.573°W
Bonnechere River Provincial Park	1989	Bonnechere River Provincial Park		45.67°N 77.69°W
Carson Lake Provincial Park	1971			45.502777777778°N 77.746388888889°W
Centennial Lake Provincial Nature Reserve	1989			45.235555555556°N 76.990833333333°W
Driftwood Provincial Park	1963	Driftwood Provincial Park		46.19°N 77.8583°W
Foy Property Provincial Park	1985	Foy Provincial Park		45.6504°N 77.5089°W
Grant's Creek Provincial Park	2006			46.151583°N 77.999357°W
Lower Madawaska River Provincial Park	1989			45.235°N 77.3547°W
Matawatchan Provincial Park	1968			45.12936°N 77.14336°W
Ottawa River Provincial Park	1989			45.715277777778°N 76.72°W
Petawawa Terrace Provincial Park	2006			45.890064°N 77.239422°W
Westmeath Provincial Park	1985	Westmeath Provincial Park		45.795°N 76.9097°W
Charleston Lake Provincial Park	1972	Charleston Lake Provincial Park		44.5028°N 76.0406°W
Voyageur Provincial Park	1966	Voyageur Provincial Park		45.5547°N 74.4533°W
DuPont Provincial Nature Reserve	2011			44.923611111111°N 75.151111111111°W
