= List of provincial parks of Southwestern Ontario =

This is a list of provincial parks in Southwestern Ontario. These provincial parks are maintained by Ontario Parks. For a list of other provincial parks in Ontario, see the List of provincial parks in Ontario.

== Bruce County ==
Name	Established	Commons category	Picture	Coordinates
Black Creek Provincial Park	1989			44.973333333333°N 81.363611111111°W
Cabot Head Provincial Nature Reserve	1985			45.209722222222°N 81.448611111111°W
Hope Bay Forest Provincial Nature Reserve	1985			44.92306°N 81.15572°W
Inverhuron Provincial Park	1967	Inverhuron Provincial Park		44.2997°N 81.5881°W
Ira Lake Provincial Nature Reserve	1989			45.039995°N 81.364884°W
Johnston Harbour-Pine Tree Point Provincial Nature Reserve	1989			45.107537°N 81.514344°W
Lion's Head Provincial Park	1985			44.997°N 81.201°W
Little Cove Provincial Nature Reserve	1985			45.247222222222°N 81.612222222222°W
MacGregor Point Provincial Park	1975	MacGregor Point Provincial Park		44.4086°N 81.4458°W
Sauble Falls Provincial Park	1971			44.6756°N 81.2567°W
Smokey Head/White Bluff Provincial Nature Reserve	1985			45.000555555556°N 81.220277777778°W

== Chatham-Kent ==
Name	Established	Commons category	Picture	Coordinates
Clear Creek Forest Provincial Park	2014			42.472314°N 81.723261°W
Rondeau Provincial Park	1894	Rondeau Provincial Park		42.2833°N 81.8667°W
Wheatley Provincial Park	1971	Wheatley Provincial Park		42.09°N 82.4472°W

== Elgin County ==
Name	Established	Picture	Coordinates
John E. Pearce Provincial Park	1957		42.608055555556°N 81.446666666667°W
Port Bruce Provincial Park	1974		42.655°N 81.013333333333°W
Port Burwell Provincial Park (formerly Iroquois Beach Provincial Park 1971-1986)	1971		42.648055555556°N 80.816111111111°W

== Essex County ==
Name	Established	Coordinates
East Sister Island Provincial Nature Reserve		41.81317°N 82.85576°W
Fish Point Provincial Nature Reserve	1985	41.7376°N 82.67139°W
Lighthouse Point Provincial Nature Reserve	1985	41.8255°N 82.63928°W
Ojibway Prairie Provincial Nature Reserve	1977	42.2655556°N 83.0766666°W

== Grey County ==
Name	Established	Commons category	Picture	Coordinates
Bayview Escarpment Provincial Nature Reserve	1985	Bayview Escarpment Provincial Nature Reserve		44.636666666667°N 80.710833333333°W
Craigleith Provincial Park	1967	Craigleith Provincial Park		44.5367°N 80.3486°W
Duncan Escarpment Provincial Nature Reserve	1985			44.416944444444°N 80.466111111111°W
Pretty River Valley Provincial Park	1985			44.426666666667°N 80.290277777778°W

== Haldimand County ==
Name	Established	Commons category	Picture	Coordinates
James N. Allan Provincial Park	1989			42.84948°N 79.663466°W
Rock Point Provincial Park	1957	Rock Point Provincial Park		42.8482°N 79.5525°W
Selkirk Provincial Park	1967			42.813888888889°N 79.958888888889°W

== Huron County ==
Name	Established	Coordinates
Morris Tract Provincial Nature Reserve	1997	43.726944444444°N 81.643333333333°W
Point Farms Provincial Park	1970	43.805°N 81.717222222222°W

== Lambton County ==
Name	Established	Commons category	Picture	Coordinates
The Pinery Provincial Park	1957	Pinery Provincial Park		43.26°N 81.8278°W

== Middlesex County ==
Name	Established	Commons category	Picture	Coordinates
Komoka Provincial Park	1989	Komoka Provincial Park		42.95°N 81.3975°W

== Norfolk County ==
Name	Established	Commons category	Picture	Coordinates
Long Point Provincial Park	1921	Long Point Provincial Park		42.58°N 80.385°W
Turkey Point Provincial Park	1959			42.7047°N 80.3333°W

== Oxford County ==
Name	Established	Coordinates
Trillium Woods Provincial Park	1969	43.06377°N 80.77787°W
