= List of provincial parks of the Golden Horseshoe =

This is a list of provincial parks in the Golden Horseshoe region of Southern Ontario. These provincial parks are maintained by Ontario Parks. For a list of other provincial parks in Ontario, see the List of provincial parks in Ontario.

Name	Established	Commons category	Picture	Coordinates
Darlington Provincial Park	1959			43.8717°N 78.7786°W
Bronte Creek Provincial Park	1975	Bronte Creek Provincial Park		43.4139°N 79.7667°W
Short Hills Provincial Park	1985	Short Hills Provincial Park		43.112°N 79.2656°W
Forks of the Credit Provincial Park	1985	Forks of the Credit Provincial Park		43.816°N 80.012°W
Duclos Point Provincial Nature Reserve	1985			44.3330°N 79.2392°W
Holland Landing Prairie Provincial Nature Reserve	1994			44.121259°N 79.490615°W
Sibbald Point Provincial Park	1957			44.327°N 79.322°W
