= Bronte Creek Provincial Park =

Provincial park in Ontario, Canada

- IUCN category II (national park)
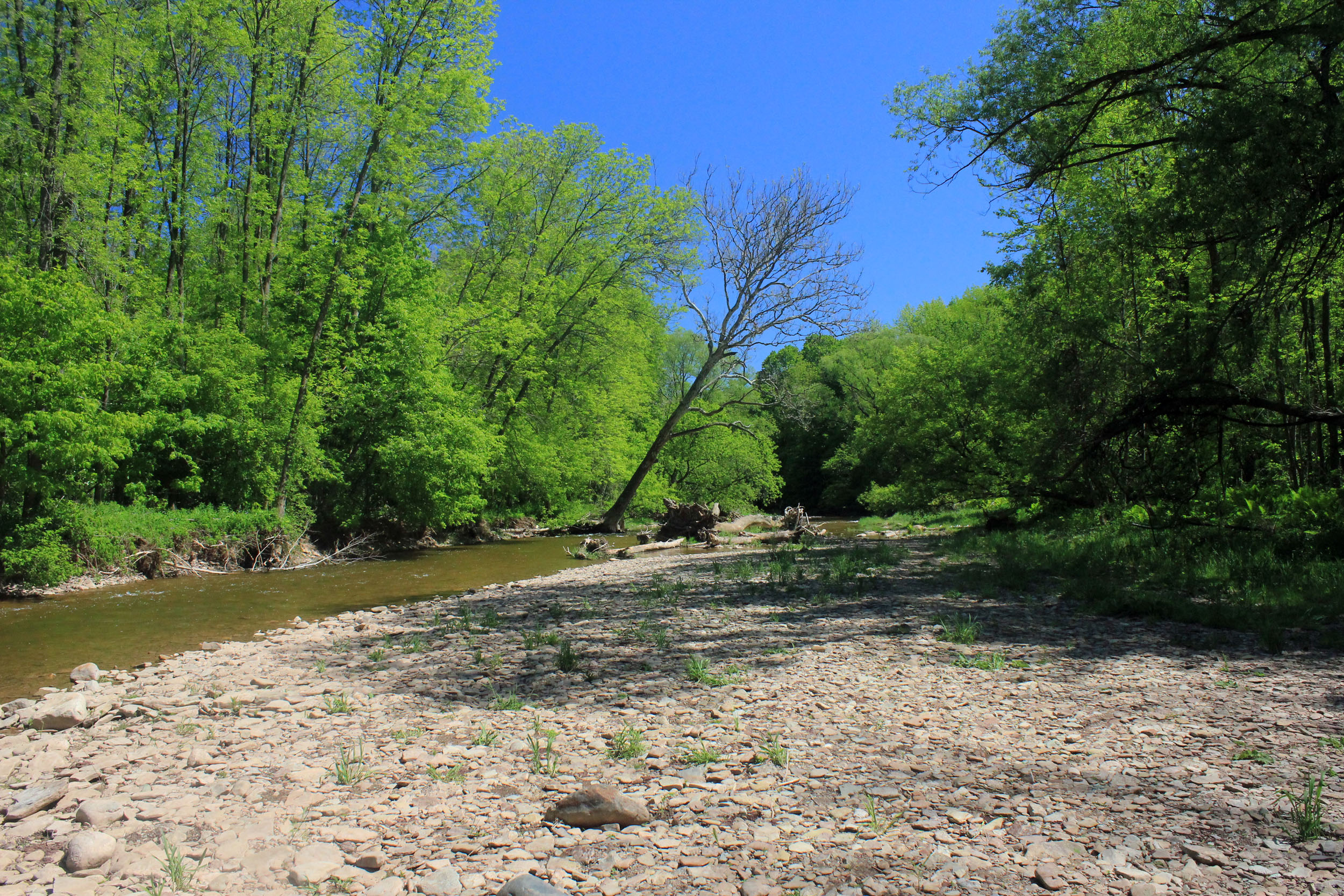
- Bronte Creek shoreline

- Location within Southern Ontario Location within Regional Municipality of Halton
- Interactive map of Bronte Creek Provincial Park
- Location: Ontario, Canada
- Nearest city: Oakville, Ontario
- Coordinates: 43°24′50″N 79°46′0″W
- Area: 6.4 km^{2} (2.5 sq mi)
- Established: 1975
- Visitors: 290,727 (in 2022)
- Governing body: Ontario Parks
- Website: ontarioparks.ca/park/brontecreek

Bronte Creek Provincial Park is a provincial park in Halton Region, Ontario, Canada. Part of the Ontario Parks system, the 6.4-square-kilometre (2.5 sq mi) park is located at the western edge of Oakville partially extending into Burlington. The park features hiking and biking trails, cross country skiing, and a play barn. During the summer, swimming is available in a large outdoor swimming pool.(Pool Temporarily Closed) Camping in the park is permitted, including sites with electrical hookups.

Bronte Creek Provincial Park has two separate activity areas (day-use and camping) which must be accessed via two separate entrances. Campground must be accessed via 3201 Upper Middle Road W, Oakville. This is off of Bronte Road, exit 111 off the QEW/ 403. The main day-use area is accessed via 1219 Burloak Drive, Oakville. (exit 109 off the QEW/ 403).

== History ==
A provincial park was proposed as early as 1956, with the proposed 32-hectare (79-acre) site being rejected for reasons of size and location. A subsequent proposal for a larger 219-hectare (540-acre) was also rejected; this time due to costs and jurisdiction with the Halton Region Conservation Authority. The current park came into being with help of James W. Snow persuading the Ontario Parks Integration Board in a meeting on Jul 27, 1971.

== Education facilities, events and programs ==
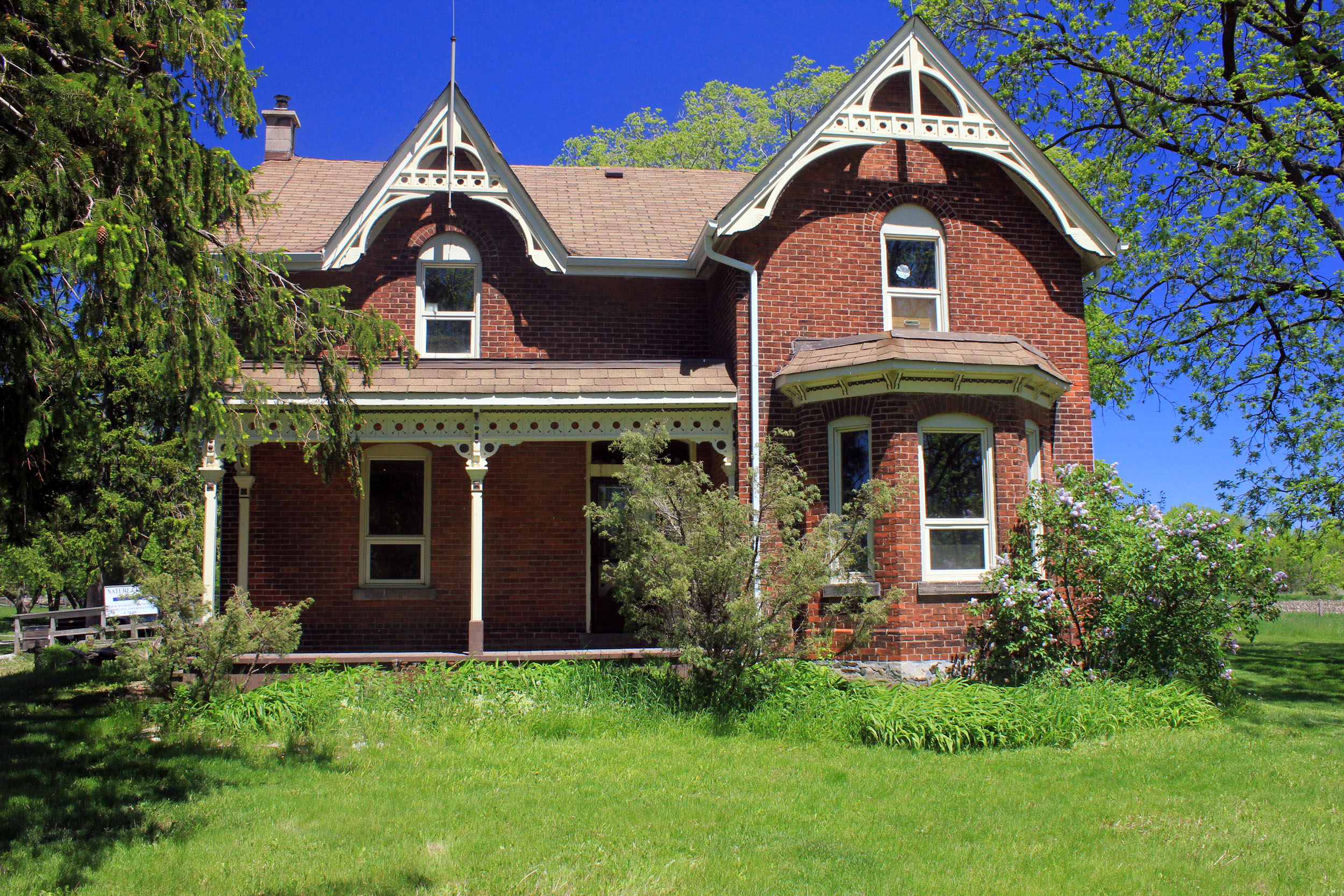
Nature Centre

=== Spruce Lane Farmhouse ===
Built in 1899, this a turn-of-the-century historic house museum near the remaining original apple orchards. Open in the summer, the house features costumed interpreters. Special events and group programs feature historical themes. The park hosts many events including: annual Maple Syrup Festival in March and Harvest Festival in September area both held at the Spruce Lane Farm. Complete list of events can be found on the events page of the Ontario Parks website.

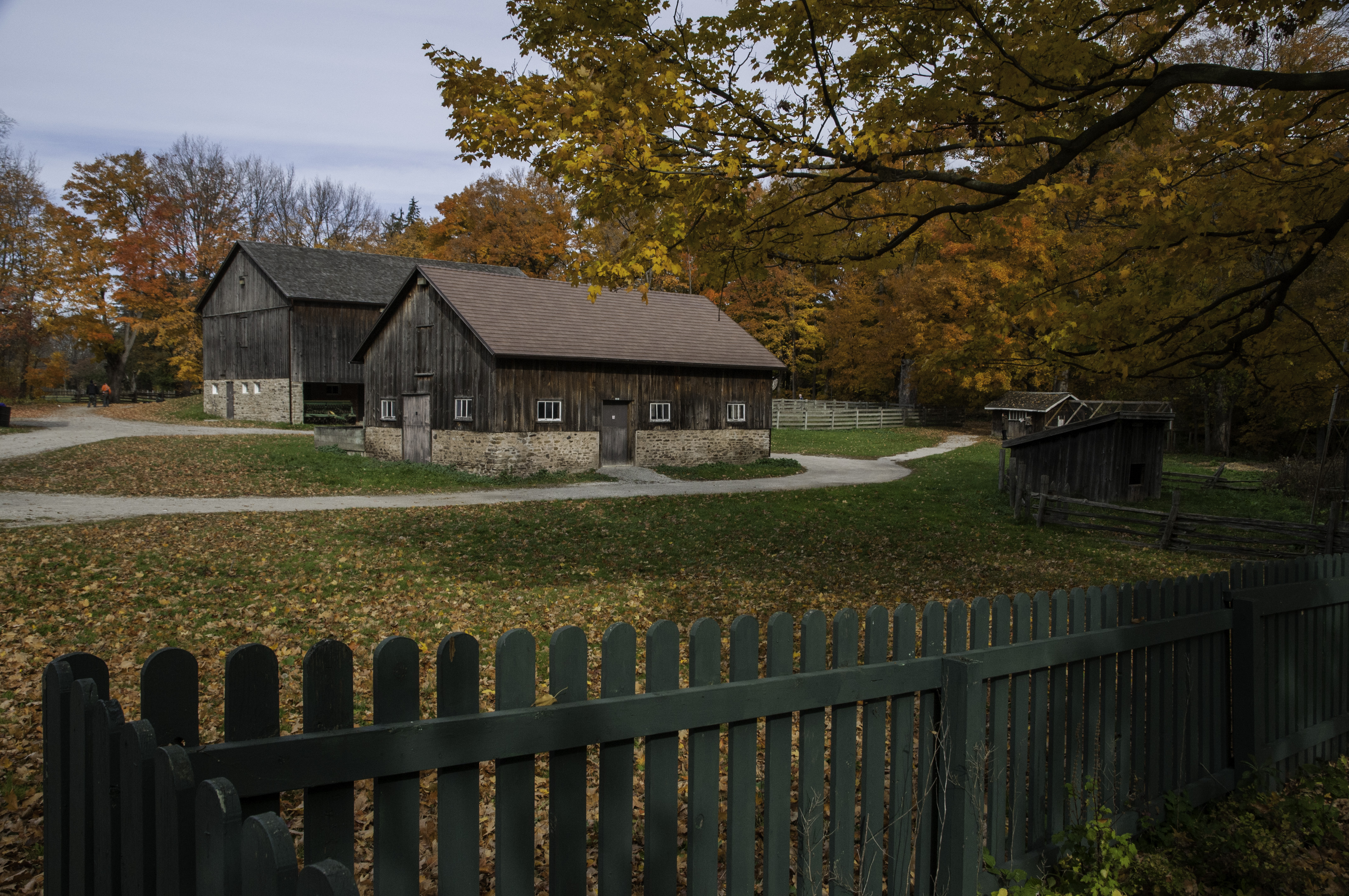
Bronte Creek Provincial Park Farmhouses

=== Nature Centre ===
The nature centre offers live animals and exhibits on natural history, and includes aquariums, terrariums, and displays on local reptiles, amphibians, birds, fish and insects. The centre is open from May to September and offers natural history and environmental programs for the general public and visiting groups.

=== School Group ===
Education programs are offered both as outreach, in park and via digital links.

Please See Ontario Parks - Discovery for more information.

=== Picnicking ===
Bronte Creek Provincial Park has 11 group picnic shelters that can be reserved for your next company or family function. There are thousands of picnic tables scattered throughout the day use area for smaller groups to use on a first-come-first-serve basis.

=== Special Events and Programs ===
Park visitors can enjoy many daily guided programs July and August. These programs are developed with children and families in mind. Topics vary with the season and current concerns such as biodiversity, creatures of the night, life under a log, invasive species and noxious plants. There is a special event offered in just about every month: Family Day activities, Maple Syrup Festival, Victorian Easter, Spring time on the farm, Ghostwalks, Harvest Festival and Victorian Christmas. The park also hosts workshops and fitness sessions: yoga, pilates, photography workshops and plein air painting day.

== Campground ==
Campers must access the campground via Bronte Road and Upper Middle Road in Oakville. A valid camping permit will allow overnight guests to enjoy the programs and facilities in the Day-Use Only Area (Burloak Drive) without paying the vehicle access fee or daily vehicle permit. Campers can enjoy our 1.8 acre or 7000+ square metre outdoor pool in July and August at a reduced daily rate. The Campground is open May - October. Reservations are highly recommended especially if camping in peak season or over a weekend. Sites all have electrical hook ups, a fire pit and picnic table. Water taps are close by and washrooms with showers, laundry and flush toilets are within a short walk of each site. Bronte Creek Provincial Park has 3 yurts, that allow guests who do not have a tent or trailer to experience camping.

== Outdoor pool ==
Open daily in July and August for park guests to enjoy a beach experience of a different sort. Shaped like a bowl the pool gently slopes to a depth of 6 feet. There is an additional fee per person to use the pool for the day. in/out privileges permitted. The Pool is temporarily CLOSED for repairs. Visit https://www.ontarioparks.com/park/brontecreek/activities for more information.

== Trails ==
- Maiden's Blush Trail – 1 km – (Located in Day-Use Area),
- Trillium Trail – 1 km – (Located in Day-Use Area),
- Ravine Trail – 2.7 km- (Located in Day-Use Area),
- Gateway Trail – 1.5 km- (located in Campground area),
- Halfmoon Valley Trail - 2 km (Located in Day-Use Area).

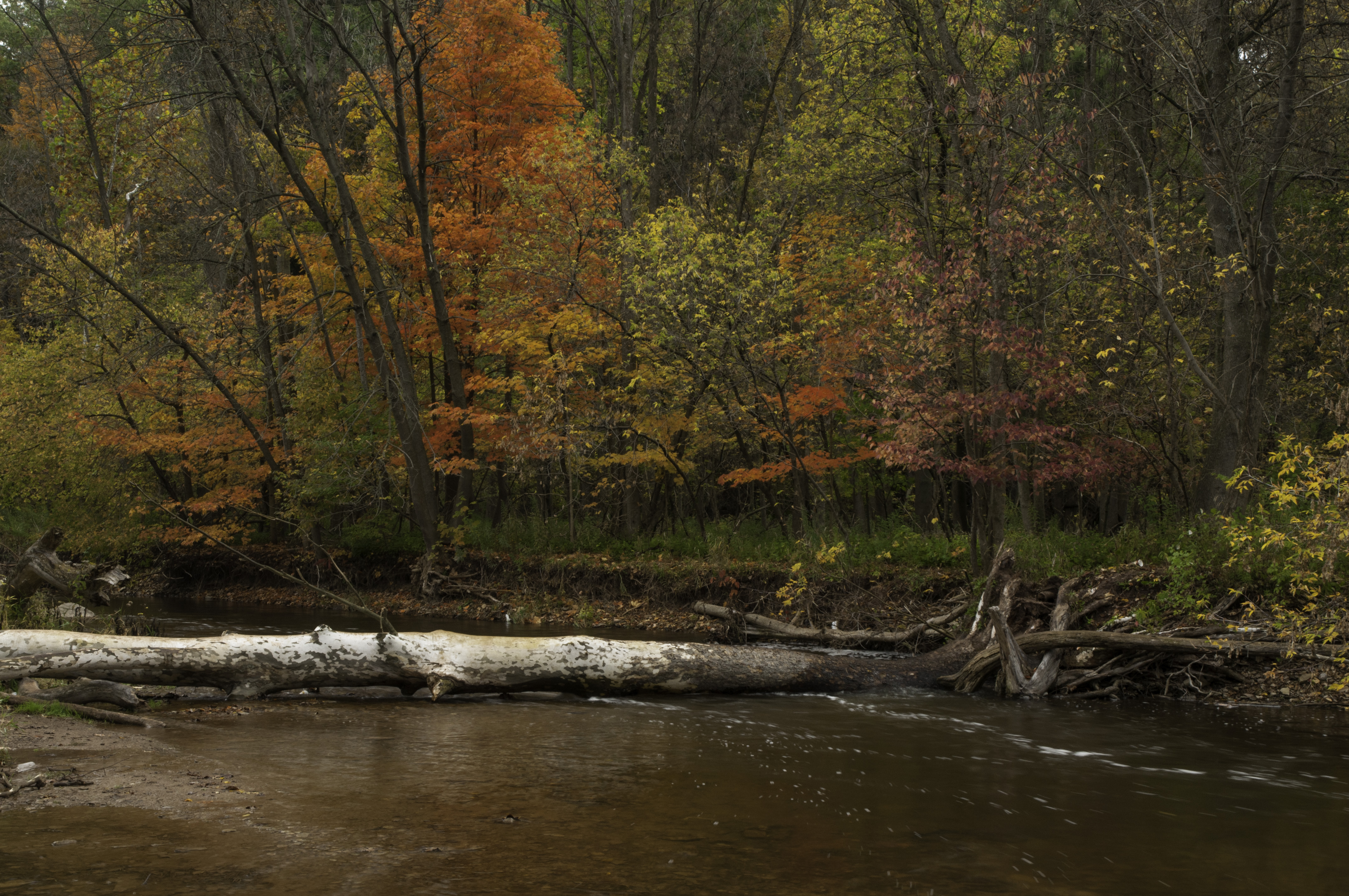
Bronte Creek in fall colours.

== Children's farm ==
The children's farm is located next to the nature centre, and features a mid 19th century barn that has been converted to a play loft and activity area, and stalls with different barnyard animals. Animals on display in the barn and nearby include pigs, chickens, rabbits, goats and sheep. Park staff farm wheat, oats, soybeans and other crops on park land. The children's farm is open year-round.

== Disc golf course ==
The disc golf course is located near parking lot F in the day-use half of the park. The course winds through pine forest and hilly marshland, offering 18 holes of disc golf with both amateur and professional teepads. The course is maintained by the Bronte Creek Disc Golf club which meets on Sundays at 10:00 am for league, which is open to everyone.

== Friends of Bronte Creek Park ==
The Friends of Bronte Creek Park is a non-profit charity run by volunteers at the park whose aim is to enhance the visitor experience at the park. 100% of the funds raised by the Friends is used to support park programs such as summer staff, animal and bird feed and to fund various projects that the Friends undertake.
