= Lake on the Mountain Provincial Park =

Provincial park in Ontario, Canada

- IUCN category II (national park)
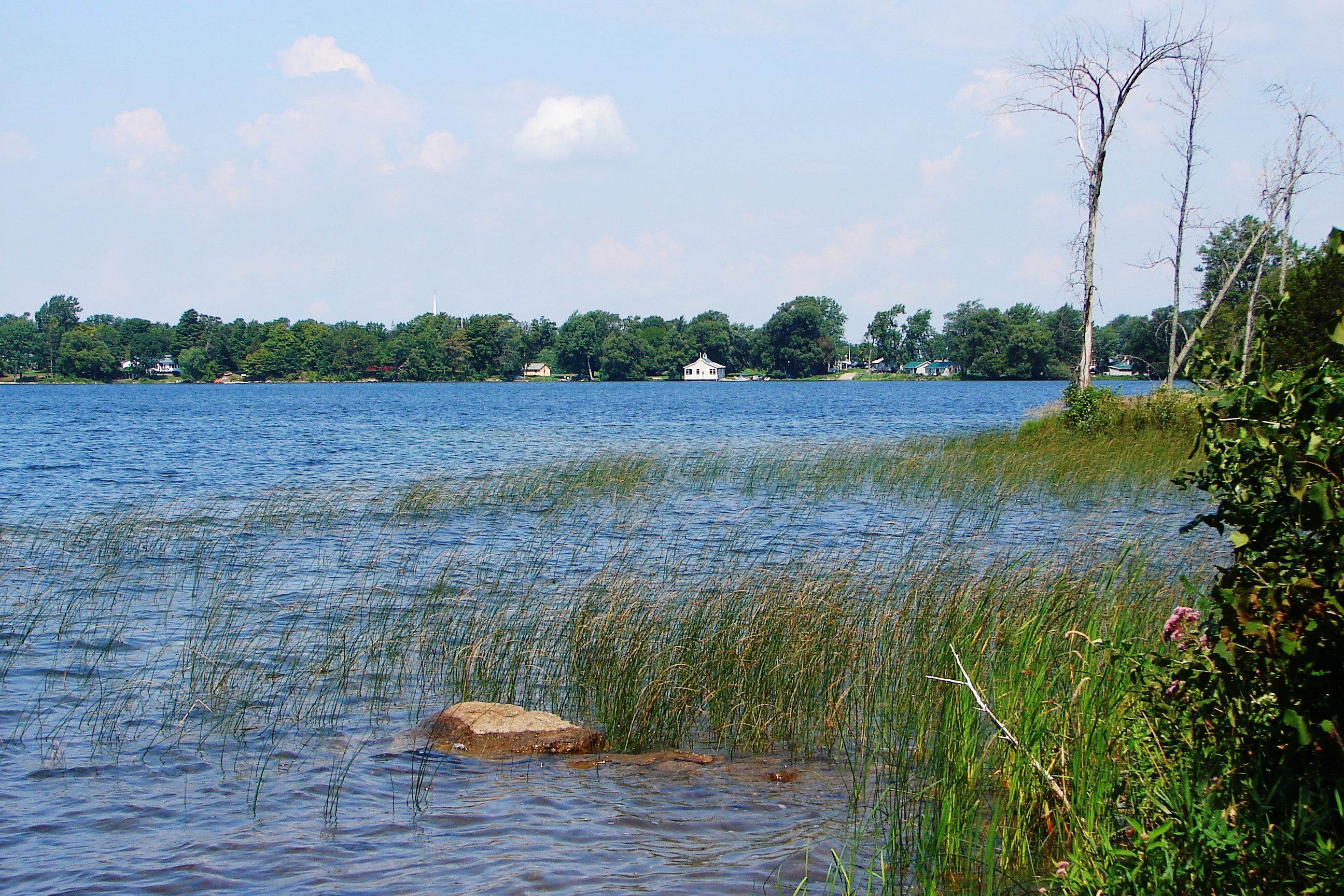
- Lake on the Mountain with the Provincial Park on the far right opposite shore

- Location within Southern Ontario
- Interactive map of Lake on the Mountain Provincial Park
- Location: Prince Edward County, Ontario, Canada
- Nearest city: Belleville, Ontario
- Coordinates: 44°02′02″N 77°03′32″W
- Area: 104 ha (260 acres)
- Established: 1957
- Visitors: 13,088 (in 2022)
- Governing body: Ontario Parks
- Website: www.ontarioparks.ca/park/lakeonthemountain

Lake on the Mountain Provincial Park is a provincial park located in Prince Edward County, Ontario, Canada. The park has an area of 104 hectares. Other than a viewing platform, parking area, and an illustrated sign explaining the physical structure of the eponymous lake, there are no facilities in the park.

The freshwater lake around which the park is based is located nearly 62 metres (203 ft) above the Bay of Quinte, from which it is separated by a narrow strip of land ending in a cliff. Often thought to have no visible source of water, it is fed by at least two small streams from the surrounding higher land, predominantly from the west, though another enters near the southeast corner. The southeast supply is more of a seasonal spring runoff, and by summer, it is sometimes completely dry. There is also a significant area of swamp to the southwest, which would act as a reservoir for water that would eventually flow into the lake. Drainage of the lake occurs on the east side, where a small stream flows down the cliff into Lake Ontario's Bay of Quinte. It is believed to be a collapsed doline (a type of sinkhole). It was believed to be bottomless by early settlers. The depth of the lake was found to be 30 meters (98 feet) by a survey in 1964.
