= Wheatley Provincial Park =

Provincial park in Ontario, Canada

- IUCN category II (national park)
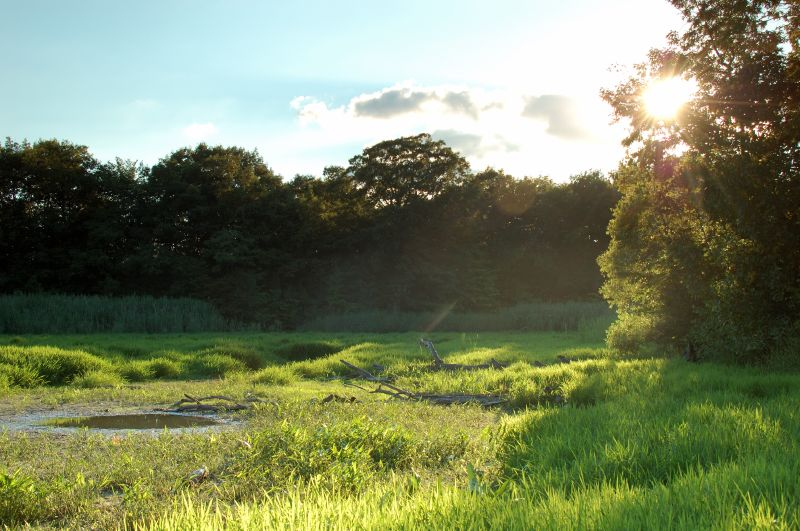
- A park marsh at sundown

- Location within Southern Ontario
- Interactive map of Wheatley Provincial Park
- Location: Chatham–Kent, Ontario, Canada
- Nearest city: Chatham
- Coordinates: 42°05′24″N 82°26′50″W
- Established: 1971
- Visitors: 118,647 (in 2022)
- Governing body: Ontario Parks
- Website: www.ontarioparks.com/park/wheatley

Wheatley Provincial Park is a protected area in the municipality of Chatham–Kent in Southwestern Ontario, Canada. It is located on Lake Erie near the community of Wheatley and occupies an area of 241 hectares (596 acres). Visitors to nearby Point Pelee National Park often camp at the park.

A number of small creeks flow through the park which provide opportunities for canoeing and viewing waterfowl, though over the past 10 years the inlet and creeks that dominate the park have mostly dried up. The park has four campgrounds: Boosey Creek, Highlands, Middle Creek and Two Creeks, offering both electrical and non-electrical campsites as well as group camping and radio-free camping.

== Gallery ==
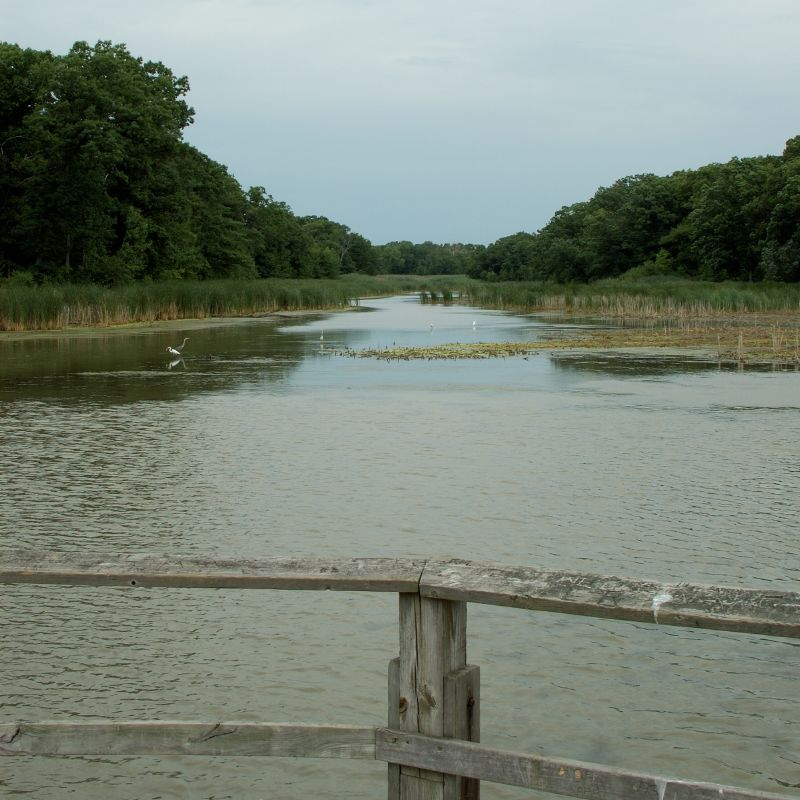
A park footbridge

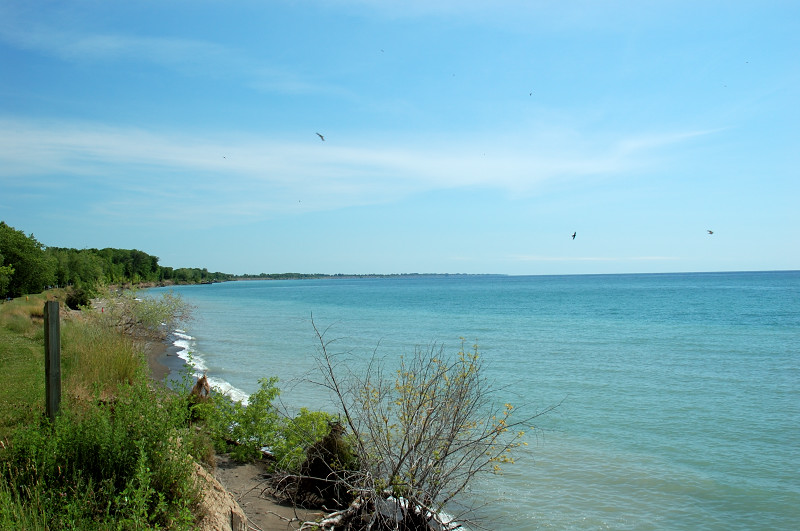
A beach on Lake Erie
