= Silent Lake Provincial Park =

Provincial park in Ontario, Canada

- IUCN category II (national park)
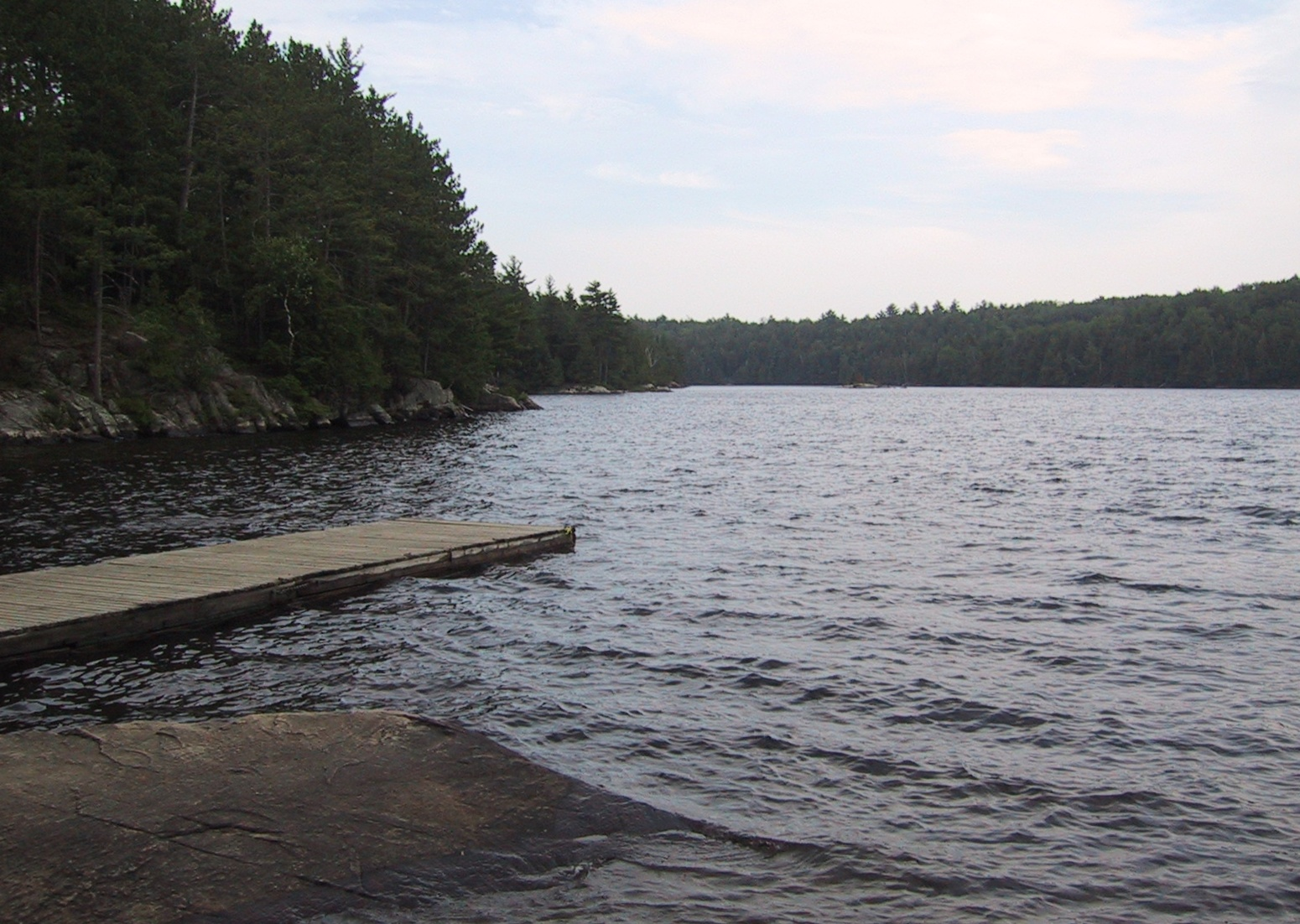

- Location within Southern Ontario
- Interactive map of Silent Lake Provincial Park
- Location: Highlands East, Haliburton County, Central Ontario, Canada
- Nearest city: Bancroft, Ontario
- Coordinates: 44°55′15″N 78°4′11″W
- Area: 1,610 ha (6.2 sq mi)
- Established: 1977
- Visitors: 93,698 (in 2022)
- Governing body: Ontario Parks
- Website: https://www.ontarioparks.ca/park/silentlake

Silent Lake Provincial Park is a provincial park located on Silent Lake in eastern Ontario, Canada, near Bancroft. The park occupies an area of 1,450 hectares (3,600 acres).

Silent Lake is located in the Canadian Shield. Recreational activities include swimming, hiking, cycling, kayaking, and canoeing; in winter, there is cross-country skiing. Canoe and kayak rentals and yurt camping are also available within the park. No motor boats or electric motors are permitted on Silent Lake.
