= Arrowhead Provincial Park =

Provincial park of Ontario, Canada

- IUCN category II (national park)
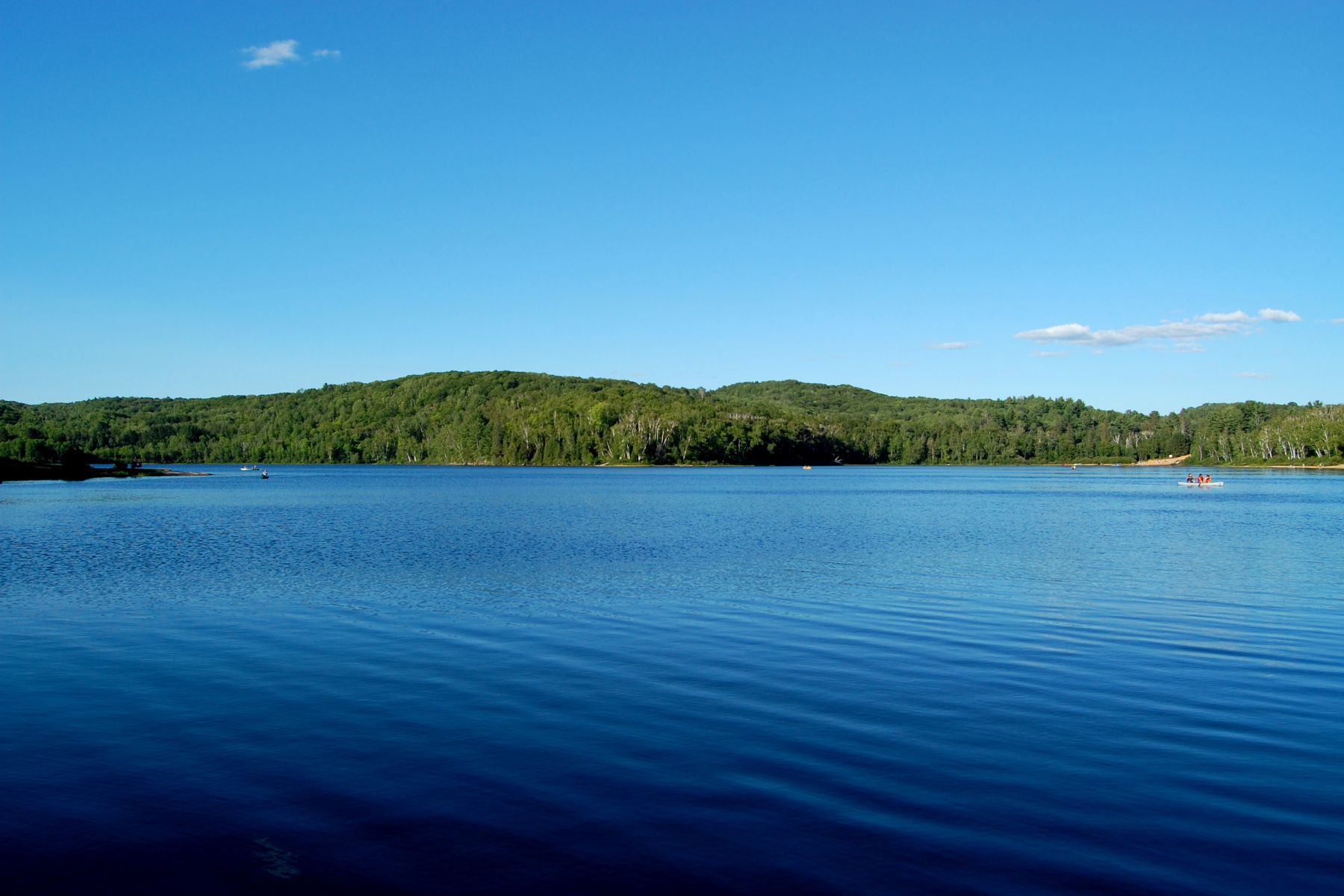
- View of Arrowhead Lake

- Location within Southern Ontario
- Interactive map of Arrowhead Provincial Park
- Location: District of Muskoka, Ontario, Canada
- Nearest city: Huntsville, Ontario
- Coordinates: 45°23′30″N 79°11′55″W
- Area: 1,237 ha (3,060 acres)
- Established: 1971
- Visitors: 290,685 (in 2022)
- Governing body: Ontario Parks
- Website: www.ontarioparks.ca/park/arrowhead

Arrowhead Provincial Park is located north of Huntsville, Ontario, Canada, and is part of the Ontario Parks system. A portion of the shoreline of Glacial Lake Algonquin is visible in the park.

During the winter, a 1.3-kilometre (0.81 mi) man-made skating trail winds through the forest. Other winter activities at the park include cross-country skiing, snowshoeing and tubing.
