= Mara Provincial Park (Ontario) =

Provincial park in Ontario, Canada

- IUCN category II (national park)
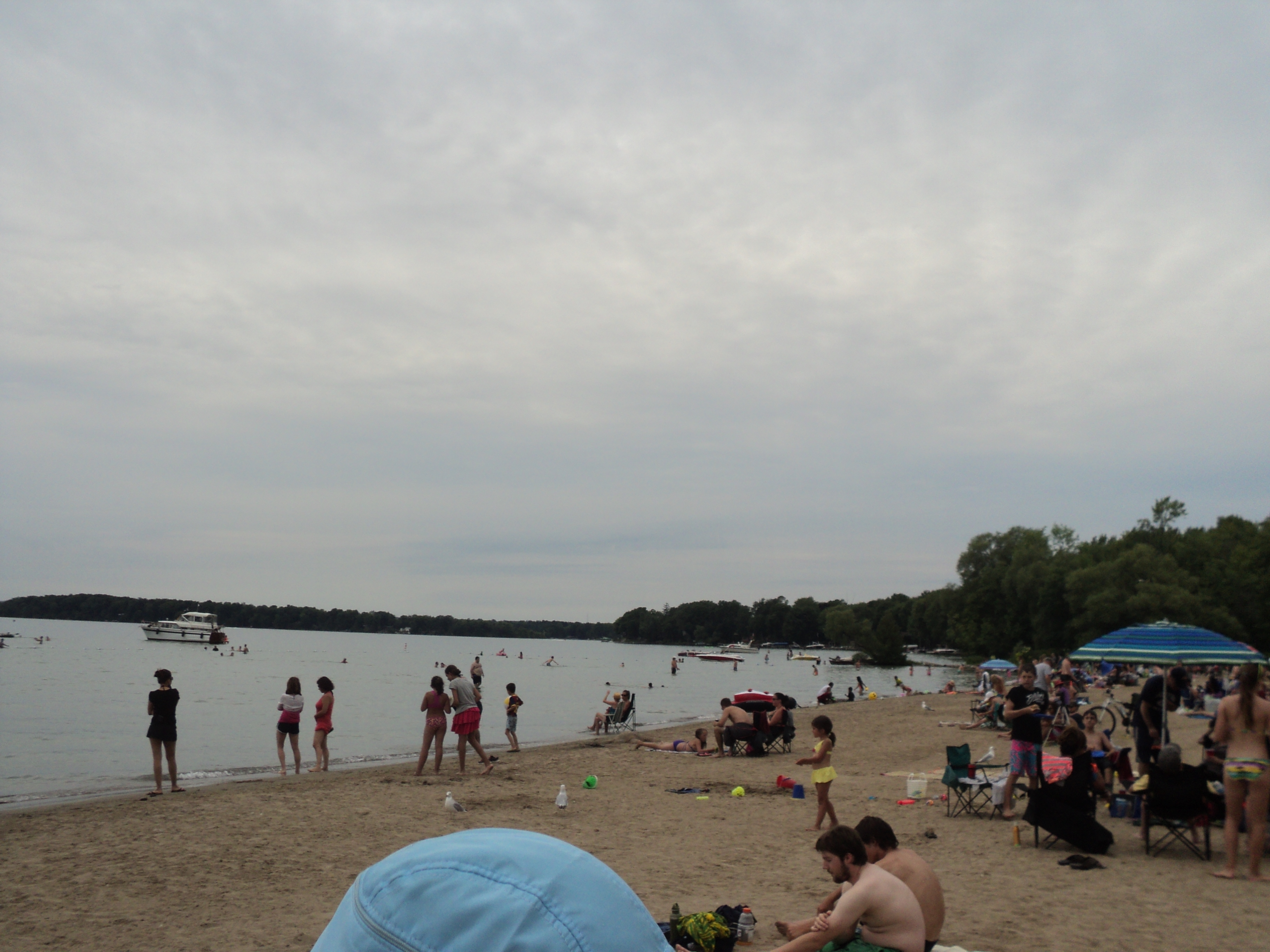
- View of the beach area along Lake Simcoe at the Park.

- Location within Southern Ontario
- Interactive map of Mara Provincial Park
- Location: County of Simcoe, Ontario, Canada
- Nearest city: Orillia, Ontario
- Coordinates: 44°35′13″N 79°21′36″W
- Area: 40 ha (99 acres)
- Established: 1970
- Visitors: 56,438 (in 2022)
- Governing body: Ontario Parks
- Website: https://www.ontarioparks.ca/park/mara

Mara Provincial Park is a provincial park in Ramara, Ontario, Canada. It is situated on the northern shore of Lake Simcoe, and provides camping, boating, swimming and other recreational activities.
