= J. Albert Bauer Provincial Park =

Provincial park of Ontario, Canada

- IUCN category II (national park)
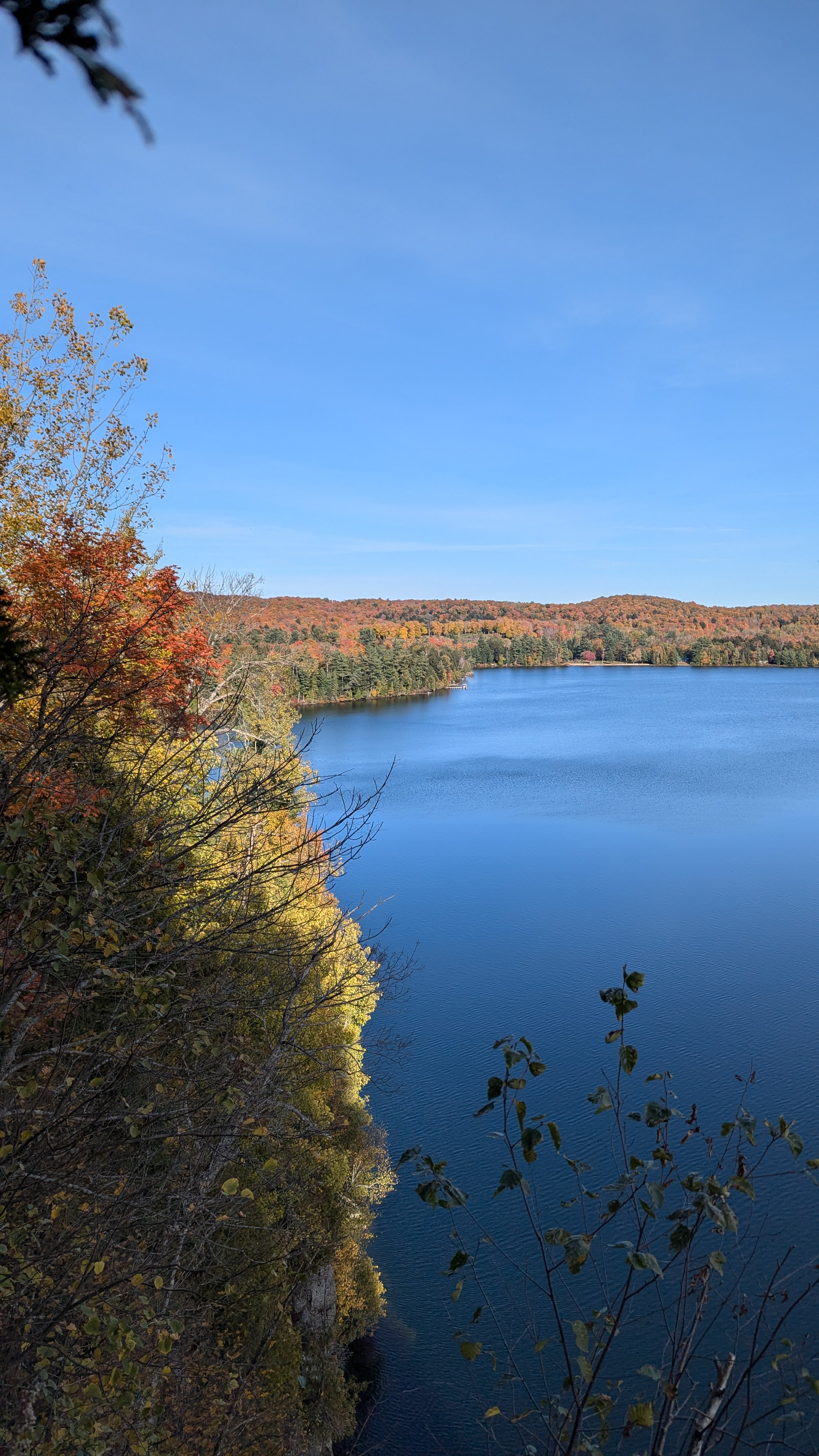
- View of Solitaire lake from Echo Rock Lookout

- Location within Southern Ontario
- Interactive map of J. Albert Bauer Provincial Park
- Location: District of Muskoka, Ontario, Canada
- Nearest city: Huntsville, Ontario
- Coordinates: 45°24′19″N 79°1′11″W
- Area: 164 ha (410 acres)
- Established: 1985
- Governing body: Ontario Parks
- Website: www.ontarioparks.ca/park/jalbertbauer

J. Albert Bauer Provincial Park is an Ontario Park located 16 kilometers northeast of Huntsville, Ontario, Canada.

The park does not have any dedicated facilities, but it lies directly adjacent to privately owned but publicly free to use Limberlost Forest and Wildlife Reserve. Part of Limberlost's Solitaire lake trail (6.3 km), including the Echo Rock Lookout, lies within J. Albert Bauer, which offers hiking and snowshoeing. Most of Eastell Lake, some of Clear lake and Turtle lake, and a large pond lie within the park.

Visitors are permitted to hike, snowshoe, swim, and canoe in the park, but camping and hunting are not permitted. All motorized vehicles are prohibited, with the exception of on the township road the passes through to access Limberlost.
