= Lower Madawaska River Provincial Park =

Provincial park in Ontario, Canada

- IUCN category II (national park)
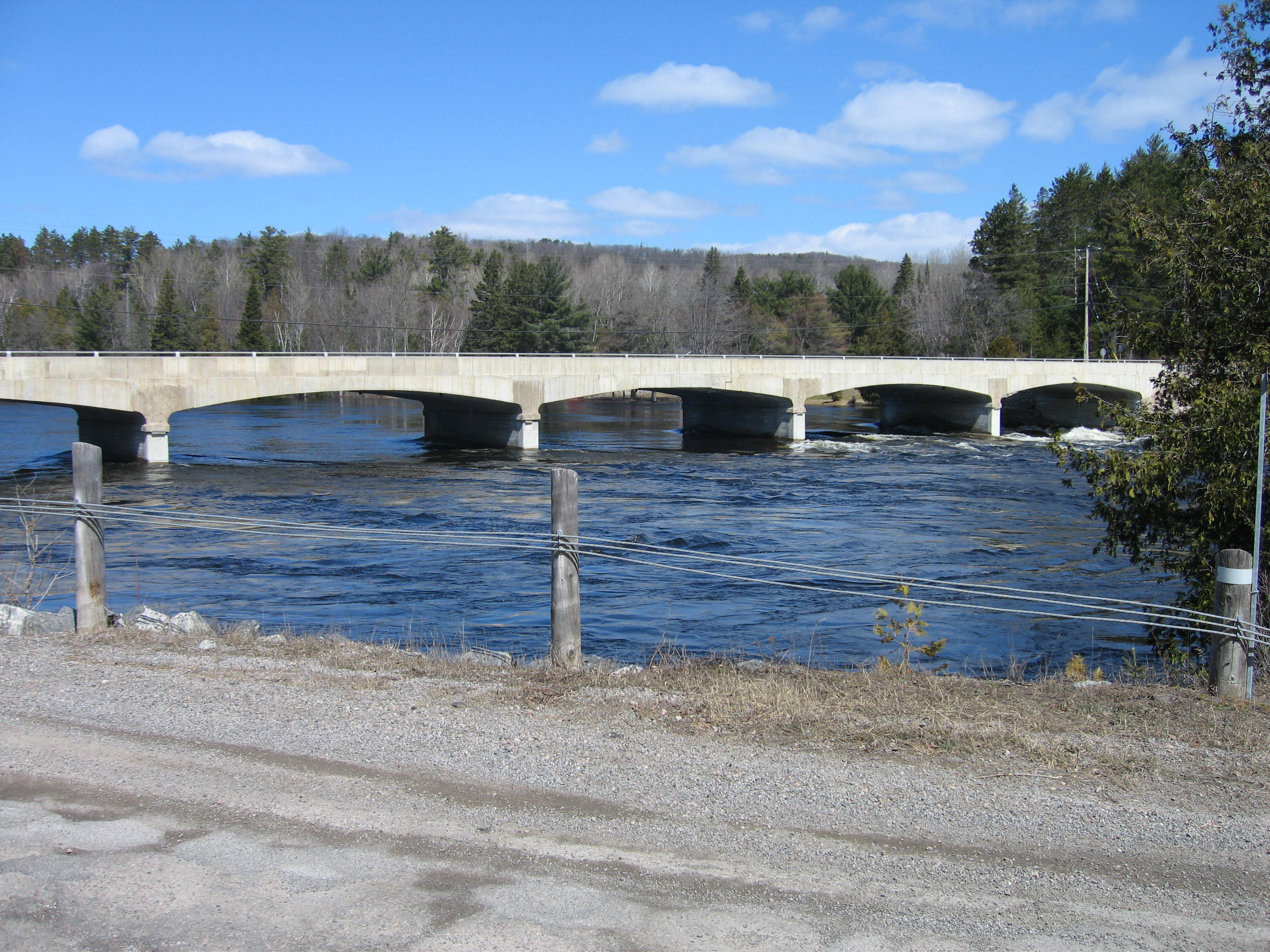
- Highway 41 bridge at Griffith. This bridge is the downstream limit of the Madawaska River Park.

- Location within Southern Ontario
- Interactive map of Lower Madawaska River Provincial Park
- Location: Madawaska River
- Nearest city: Renfrew, Ontario
- Coordinates: 45°14′06″N 77°21′17″W
- Area: 12 km^{2} (4.6 sq mi)
- Established: 1989
- Governing body: Ontario Parks

Lower Madawaska River Provincial Park is a waterway-class provincial park on the Madawaska River in Renfrew County, Ontario, Canada. The park includes the shores on both sides of the Madawaska River from Latchford Bridge to Griffith.

A non-operating park, it offers neither facilities nor services. Its most popular use is for whitewater kayaking and canoeing.

== See also ==
- Upper Madawaska River Provincial Park - non-contiguous park that protects the upstream/northern portion of the same river.
- List of Ontario parks
