= Mono Cliffs Provincial Park =

Provincial park in Ontario, Canada

- IUCN category II (national park)
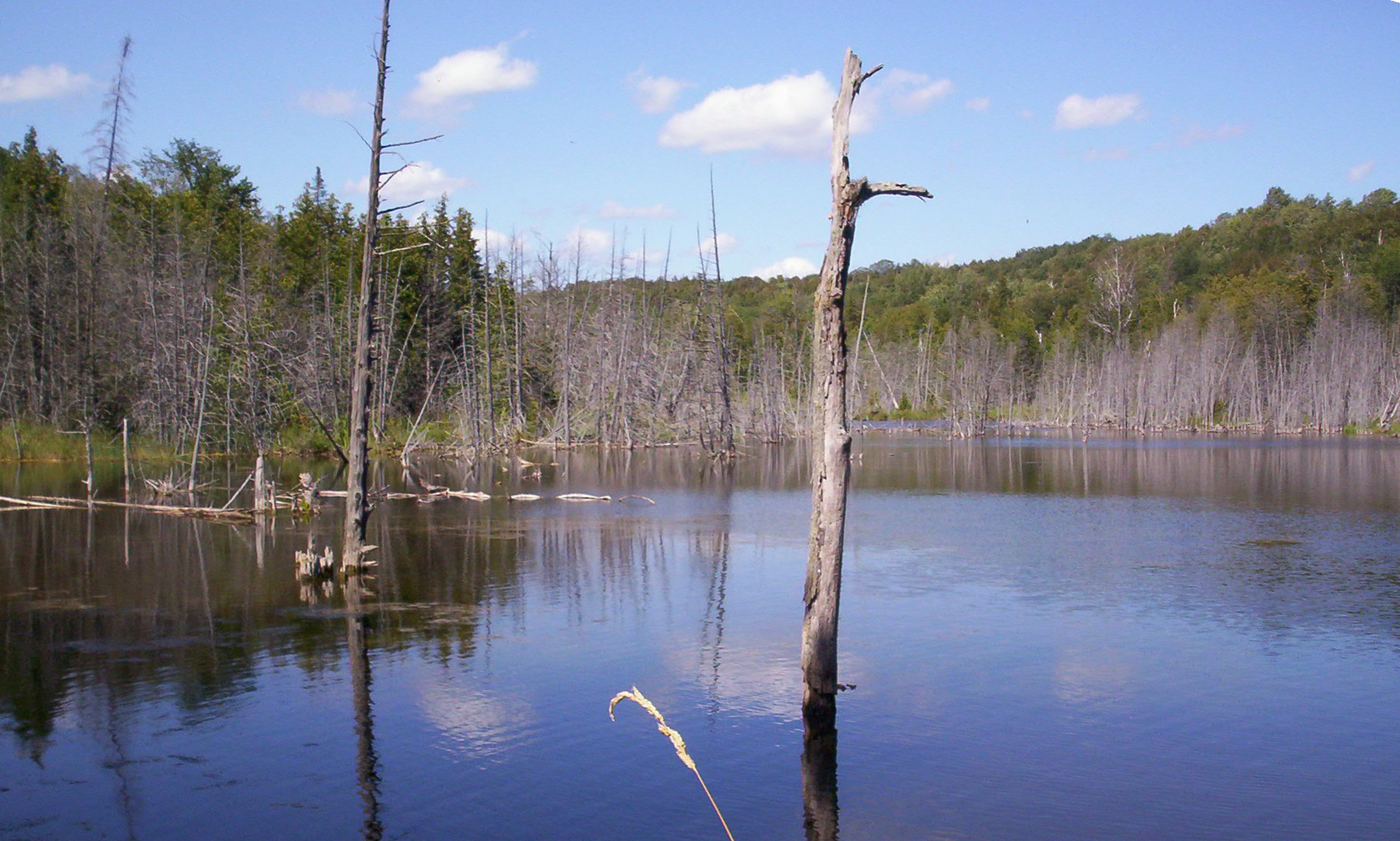
- View of McCarston's Lake

- Location within Southern Ontario
- Interactive map of Mono Cliffs Provincial Park
- Location: Ontario, Canada
- Nearest city: Mono
- Coordinates: 44°02′48″N 80°04′37″W
- Area: 732 ha (1,810 acres)
- Established: 1985
- Visitors: 64,107 (in 2022)
- Governing body: Ontario Parks
- Website: www.ontarioparks.com/park/monocliffs

Mono Cliffs Provincial Park lies within the rural town of Mono, in southern Ontario, Canada, along the Bruce Trail. It is part of the Niagara Escarpment Parks System, and the escarpment Biosphere Reserve.

== Main entrance ==
The main entrance to the park is located along the 3rd Line E.H.S. at a pay parking lot with washrooms. There is a map of the park and the seven colour-coded trails:

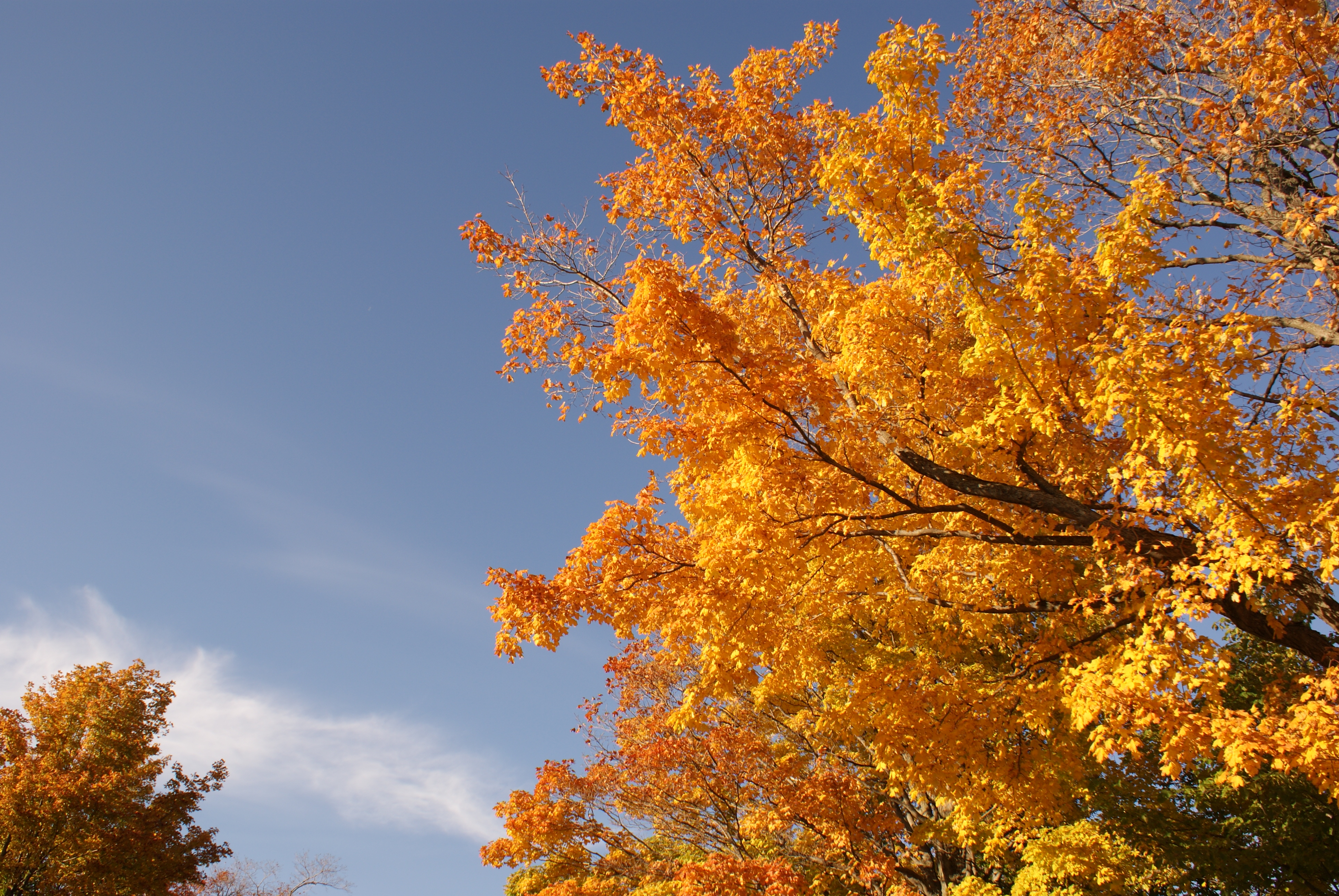
Vivid autumn colours draw large crowds each fall.

- Carriage Trail (red)
- Spillway Trail (blue)
- Cliff Top Trail (green)
- McCarston's Lake (orange)
- South Outlier Trail (yellow)
- Lookout Trail (grey)
- Bruce Trail (dotted)

The map also indicates how each section of the trail can be used:

- hiking
- biking
- horseback riding
- camping

== Natural features ==
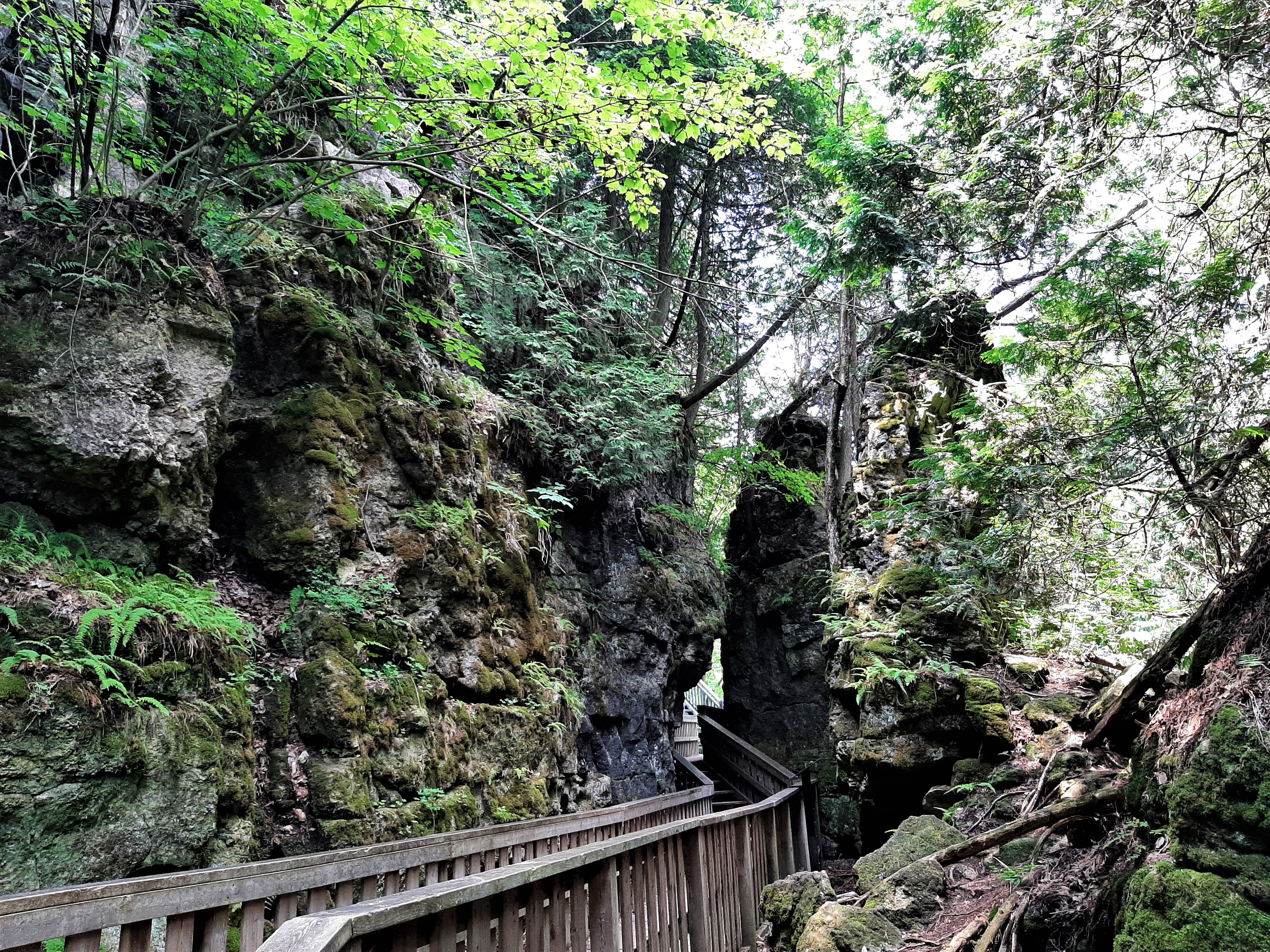
Cliff Top Trail

Rock faces: As the name suggests, the park has a number of cliff faces along the Niagara Escarpment itself. Along the Cliff Top Trail is a sturdy set of stairs which descend about 30 metres (98 ft) down the rock face to a wooden path that runs between the cliff face and a small outlier, providing excellent views of the rock, ferns, and cedars. Caving, rock climbing, bouldering, and scrambling are not permitted anywhere in the park.

Also along the Cliff Top Trail is a viewing platform that extends out over the cliff edge, with a great view to the north east across the park to the farms beyond.

Large Outliers: There are two large 'outliers' that have been separated from the main escarpment edge.

Water features: In the north west corner of the park is McCarston's Lake. There are also a number of streams and smaller ponds throughout the park, the largest just below the viewing platform.

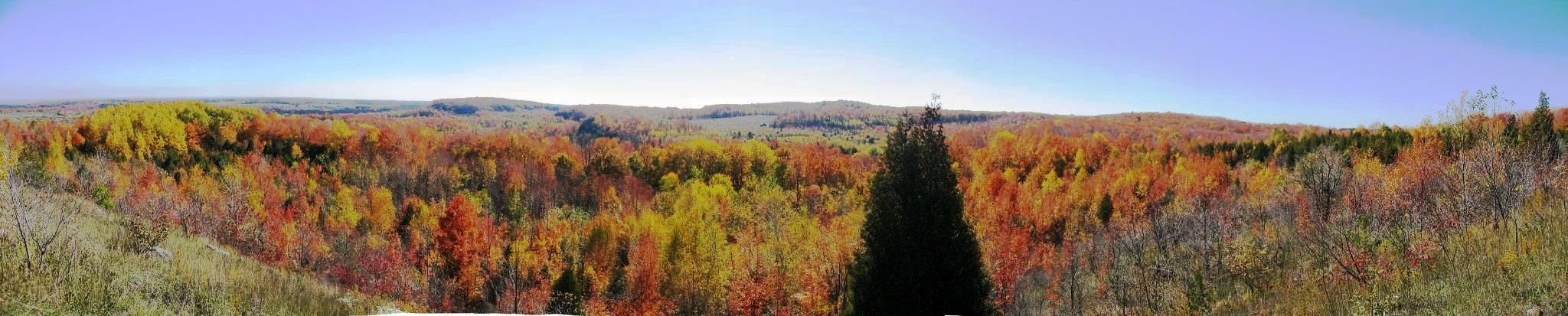
The park in autumn
