= Bell Bay Provincial Park =

Provincial park in Ontario, Canada

- Location within Ontario
- Location: Barry's Bay, Ontario, Canada
- Coordinates: 45°29′53″N 77°51′39″W
- Area: 558 ha (1,380 acres)
- Established: 1989
- Governing body: Ontario Parks
- Website: www.ontarioparks.com/park/bellbay

Bell Bay Provincial Park is a non-operating provincial park about 14 kilometres (9 mi) west of Barry's Bay, Renfrew, Ontario, Canada. The park includes an example of Black Ash swamp.
