= Six Mile Lake Provincial Park =

Provincial park in Ontario, Canada

- IUCN category II (national park)
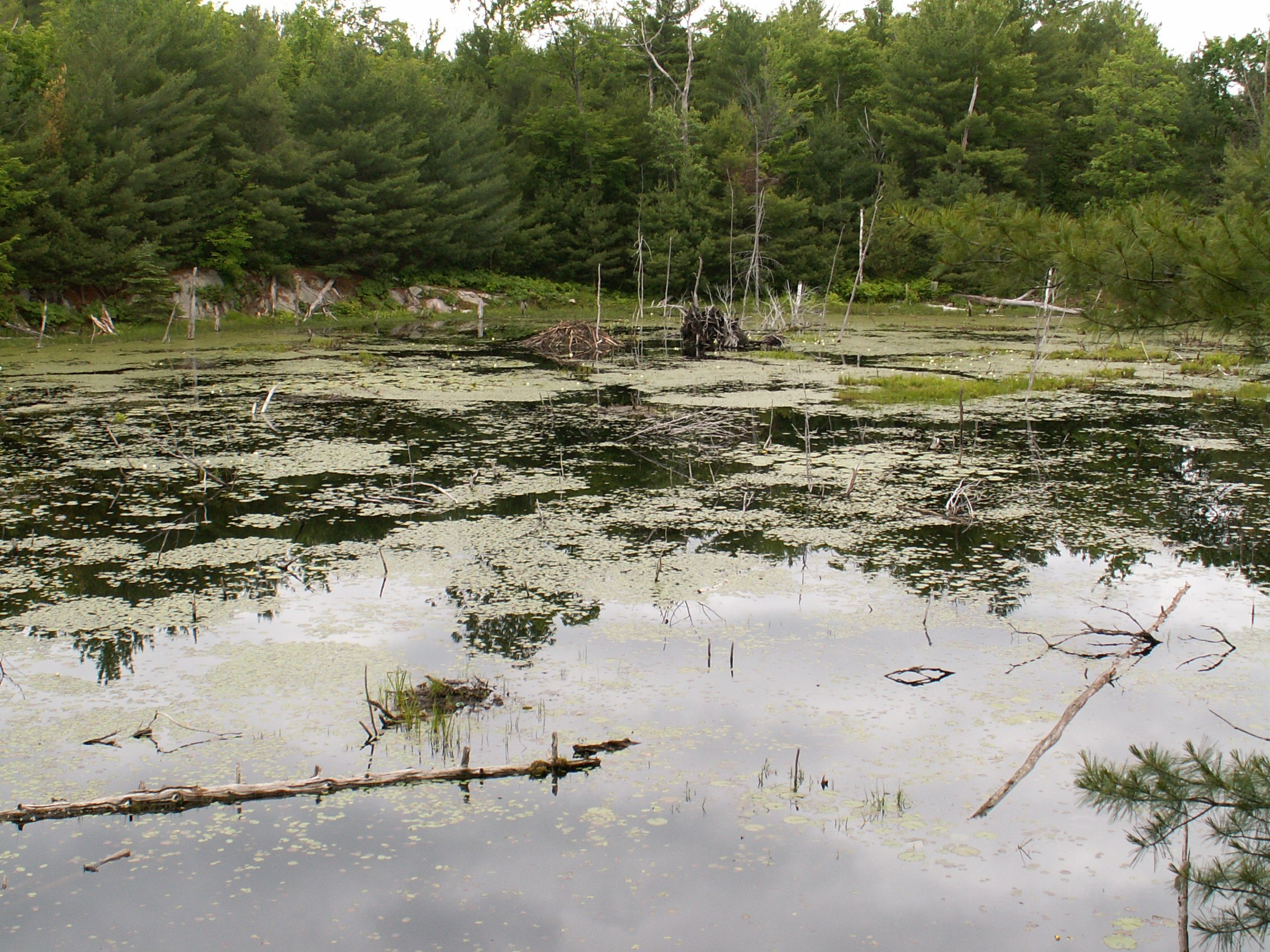

- Location within Southern Ontario
- Interactive map of Six Mile Lake Provincial Park
- Location: District of Muskoka, Ontario, Canada
- Nearest town: Port Severn
- Coordinates: 44°53′56″N 79°45′29″W
- Established: 1958
- Visitors: 71,130 (in 2022)
- Governing body: Ontario Parks

Six Mile Lake Provincial Park is a provincial park located in Ontario, Canada, near Georgian Bay on Six Mile Lake.

Popular features of the park include hiking trails and three beaches. There is an abundance of wildlife, including walking sticks and five-lined skinks.
