= Turkey Point Provincial Park =

Park in Ontario

- IUCN category II (national park)
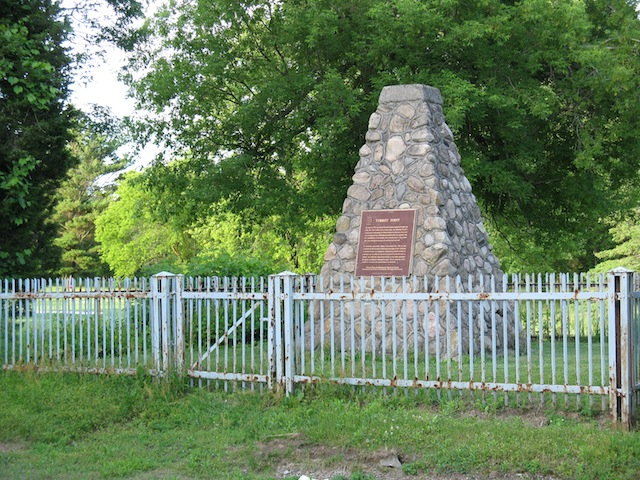
- Fort Norfolk National Historic Site, also called Turkey Point, at Turkey Point Provincial Park, Ontario

- Location within Southern Ontario
- Interactive map of Turkey Point Provincial Park
- Location: Norfolk County, Ontario, Canada
- Nearest city: Turkey Point, Ontario
- Coordinates: 42°42′17″N 80°20′00″W
- Area: 316 ha (780 acres)
- Established: 1959
- Visitors: 140,253 (in 2022)
- Governing body: Ontario Parks
- Website: www.ontarioparks.com/park/turkeypoint

National Historic Site of Canada
- Official name: Fort Norfolk National Historic Site of Canada
- Designated: 15 May 1925

Turkey Point Provincial Park is located in Turkey Point, Ontario, Canada and is part of the Ontario Parks system. It is the only Ontario provincial park to include a golf course. The Normandale Fish Hatchery is in the park, and is accessible via one of the hiking trails.
