= Westmeath Provincial Park =

Provincial Park in Westmeath, Ontario

- IUCN category II (national park)
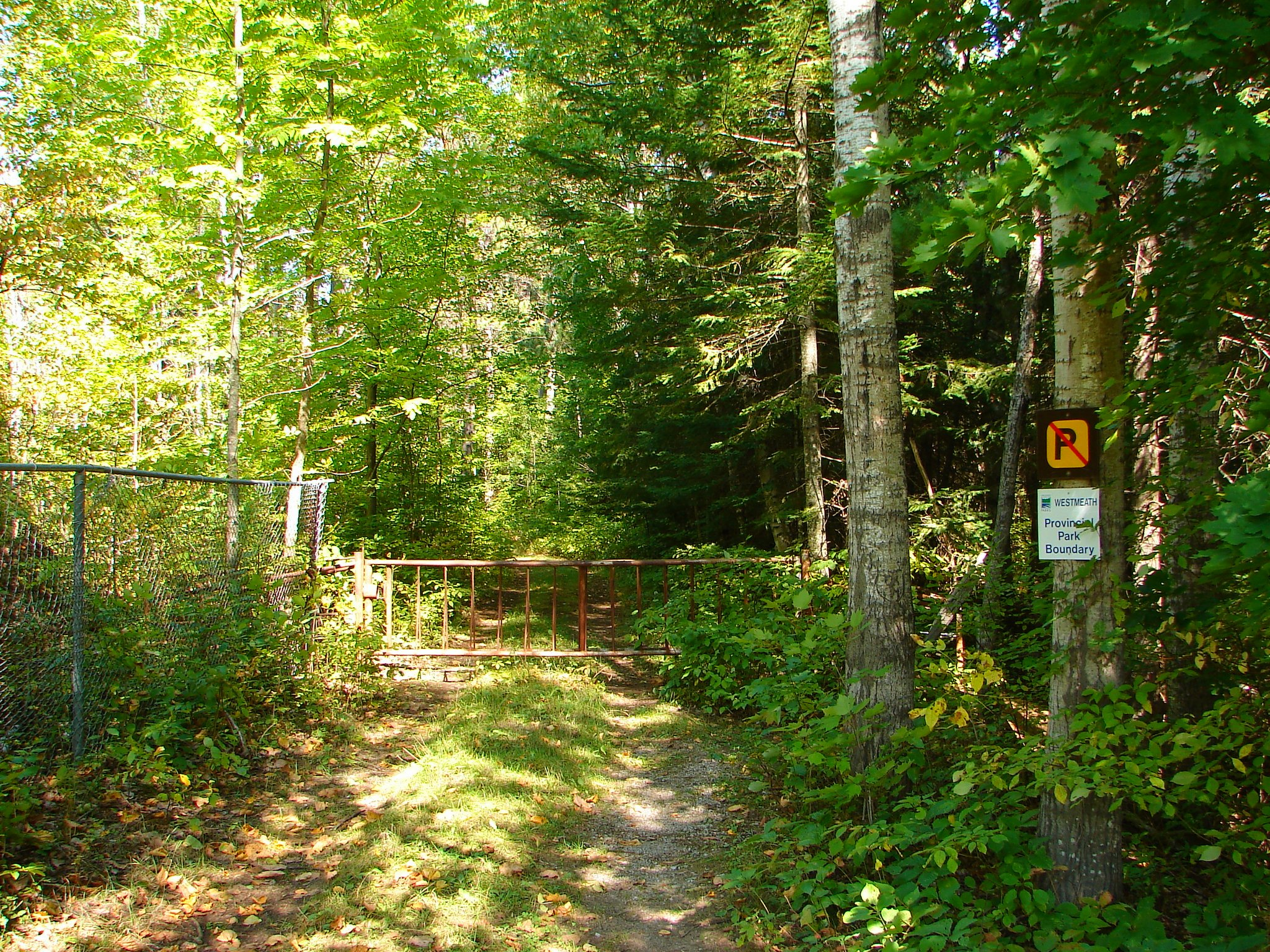

- Location within Ontario
- Interactive map of Westmeath Provincial Park
- Location: Ottawa River
- Nearest city: Pembroke, Ontario
- Coordinates: 45°47′42″N 76°54′35″W
- Area: 610 hectares (1,500 acres)
- Governing body: Ontario Parks

Westmeath Provincial Park is a provincial park on the Ottawa River in Renfrew County, Ontario, Canada. Located on the section of the river known as Bellows Bay, it features a long sandy beach and an active sandspit. It is one of the most pristine sand dune and wetland complexes along the southern Ottawa River.

As a non-operating park, the park has no facilities and overnight camping is not permitted. Its primary purpose is the protection the sand dunes and wetlands and their distinctive species. Unlike most Ontario provincial parks, where hunting and possession of firearms are prohibited, waterfowl hunting is allowed within the park.

== Ecology ==
This sand spit, dune and wetland complex occurs on the south shore of the Ottawa River near the town of Westmeath. It is built from sand deposits laid down by the Ottawa River near the end of the last ice age, when larger areas of the Great Lakes drained east down the Ottawa River Valley. Near Pembroke this ancient river entered the Champlain Sea, and deposited areas of sand and clay as its delta within the Champlain sea, which at that time flooded west up the Ottawa Valley. Hence these dunes partly reflect an ancient ocean shoreline. The dunes appear to be the best remaining example along the Ottawa River.

The park is home to 300 plant species, including 10 which are provincially or regionally rare, and a wide array of types of wetlands representative of the Ottawa River. There are six provincially significant plant species known, Bulbostylis capillaris, Danthonia compressa, Hudsonia tomentosa, Polygonella articulata and Stipa spartea. There is also a substantial population of butternut trees.

The park has a rich diversity of wildlife, including 184 species of birds sighted, of which nearly half may breed in the park. Black terns may nest in Bellows Bay. Many other waterfowl use the park during migration.

The Bellows Bay portion is home to the spiny softshell turtle and the map turtle. This is the only known location on the Ottawa River for the spiny softshell, which is designated as "threatened" under the Canadian Species At Risk Act, while the map turtle is designated as "Special Concern".

One of the important functions of natural areas like Westmeath is to provide natural areas for the study of ecological principles that apply well beyond the boundaries of the park itself. Westmeath is an important natural study area, as it has some of the widest variation in wetland plant communities of any single location along the Ottawa River, from open sand beaches with reeds and sedges to densely vegetated bays with cattails. Hence, it has provided an important natural laboratory for the study of wetlands along the Ottawa River in particular, and in marsh ecology as a whole. During the 1980s, a team from the University of Ottawa used this outdoor laboratory as one source of data for a wetland classification system for the rest of the marshes along the Ottawa River. The open sandy wetlands provided an important reference point in this classification system. Such areas have relatively low nutrient levels, particularly compared to most bays, and sites downstream from Ottawa-Hull. These open wetlands are dominated by partially evergreen and deeply rooted plants, that can tolerate the infertile conditions, damage by waves, and spring ice scouring. Another study used experimental transplants to measure the amount of above and below ground competition along the natural gradient from exposed sand shore to densely vegetated bay, showing that below ground competition was relatively constant across wetland types, but above ground competition increased with vegetation biomass. This was the first study to provide such an important documentation of competition gradients in wetlands, and led to a general model for above and below ground competition in wetlands. Studies of plant diversity also showed that this area has enormously high plant diversity compared to other types of wetlands. Table 1 in that paper refers to unusual shoreline vegetation, with plants including Ranunculus reptans and Eriocaulon septangulare (two evergreen species) and Drosera intermedia and Utricularia cornuta (two carnivorous species). Westmeath therefore provides an historical reference point for scientific papers in international journals, and these studies have even found its way into text books of wetland ecology.

There are also extensive areas of silver maple swamp. These swamps depend upon the natural variation in the Ottawa River. High water periods drown terrestrial plants that would out-compete the maples, while lower water periods in mid-summer allow the maple trees to recover and grow. Hence, spring floods are an important part of the ecology of these wetlands.

Owing to their small stature and slow growth, shoreline plants such as Eriocaulon septangulare and Drosera intermedia are easily damaged by human traffic and all-terrain vehicles. Illegal all-terrain vehicle use in the park constitutes an ongoing threat to its ecosystem.

== History ==
Before its opening in 1991, the Federation of Ontario Naturalists pushed for the park to be designated as "Nature Reserve", which would give it maximum ecological protection and minimal human use. Ultimately, the Ministry of Natural Resources gave it the "Natural Environment" classification, which allowed for hunting, swimming and a proposed parking lot. Under the management plan, 47% of the park area is designated as "Nature Reserve".

== See also ==
- List of Ontario parks
