= Quackenbush Provincial Park =

Provincial park in Ontario, Canada

- IUCN category III (natural monument or feature)
- Location within Southern Ontario
- Location: Douro-Dummer, Ontario, Canada
- Coordinates: 44°33′40″N 78°00′07″W
- Area: 40.00 ha (98.8 acres)
- Designation: Cultural heritage
- Established: 1985
- Governing body: Ontario Parks
- Website: www.ontarioparks.ca/park/quackenbush

Quackenbush Provincial Park is a non-operating Ontario Park, located 40 kilometres (25 mi) northwest of Peterborough, Ontario, within Lot 29 of Concession 12 in Dummer Township.

Archaeological site excavations between 1954 and 1973 revealed that there is a Huron-Wendat First Nation village buried on the site that has connections to their culture. Because of this, the park is protected for its historical significance. There are no visitors' facilities, and recreational visits are discouraged.

There has only been a small amount of excavation on the site, but it has unearthed signs of three longhouses (one containing a mass grave), as well as ecological matter from human occupation. The bodies found in the mass grave, all showed signs that they encountered violence, which would indicate that the known widespread conflict that occurred during the late 15th century also took place here.
