= Voyageur Provincial Park =

Provincial park in Ontario, Canada

- IUCN category II (national park)
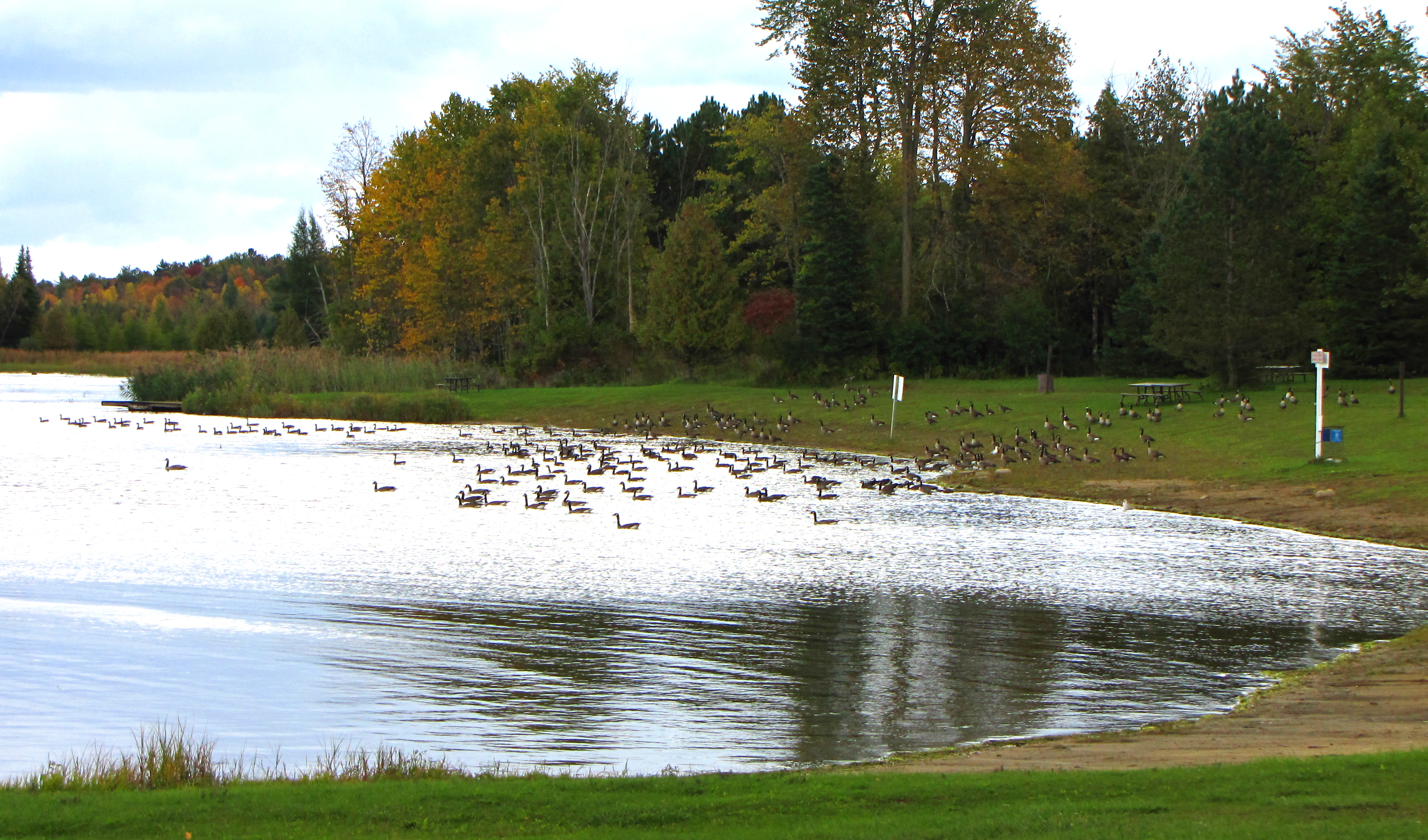
- Day-use area with migrating Canada geese

- Location within Southern Ontario
- Interactive map of Voyageur Provincial Park
- Location: Hawkesbury, Ontario
- Coordinates: 45°33′17″N 74°27′12″W
- Area: 1,464 hectares (3,620 acres)
- Established: 1966
- Governing body: Ontario Parks

Voyageur Provincial Park is a provincial park located in eastern Ontario, Canada, opposite the once furious Long Sault rapids of the Ottawa River around which voyageurs portaged on their way upstream. Established in 1966, the park was formerly known as Carillon Provincial Park.

The park has 416 campsites, 110 with electrical service. Group camping is also available. The park has a day-use area and comfort stations for campers. There are two hiking trails—Coureur de Bois Trail (2 km; 1¼ miles, 1 hour) and Outouais Trail (5 km; 3 miles return)—both rated easy. In the winter, cross-country ski trails are available.

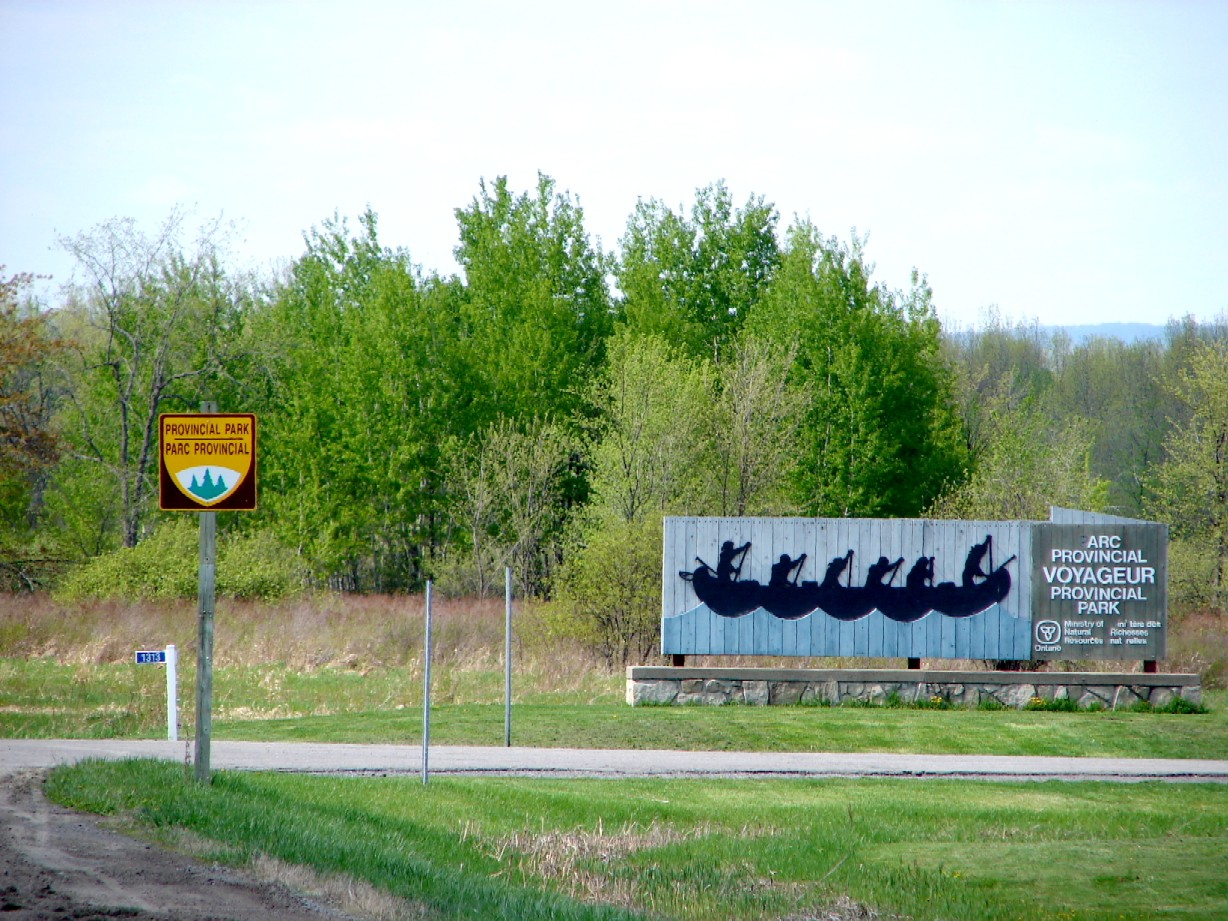
Entrance to Voyageur Provincial Park

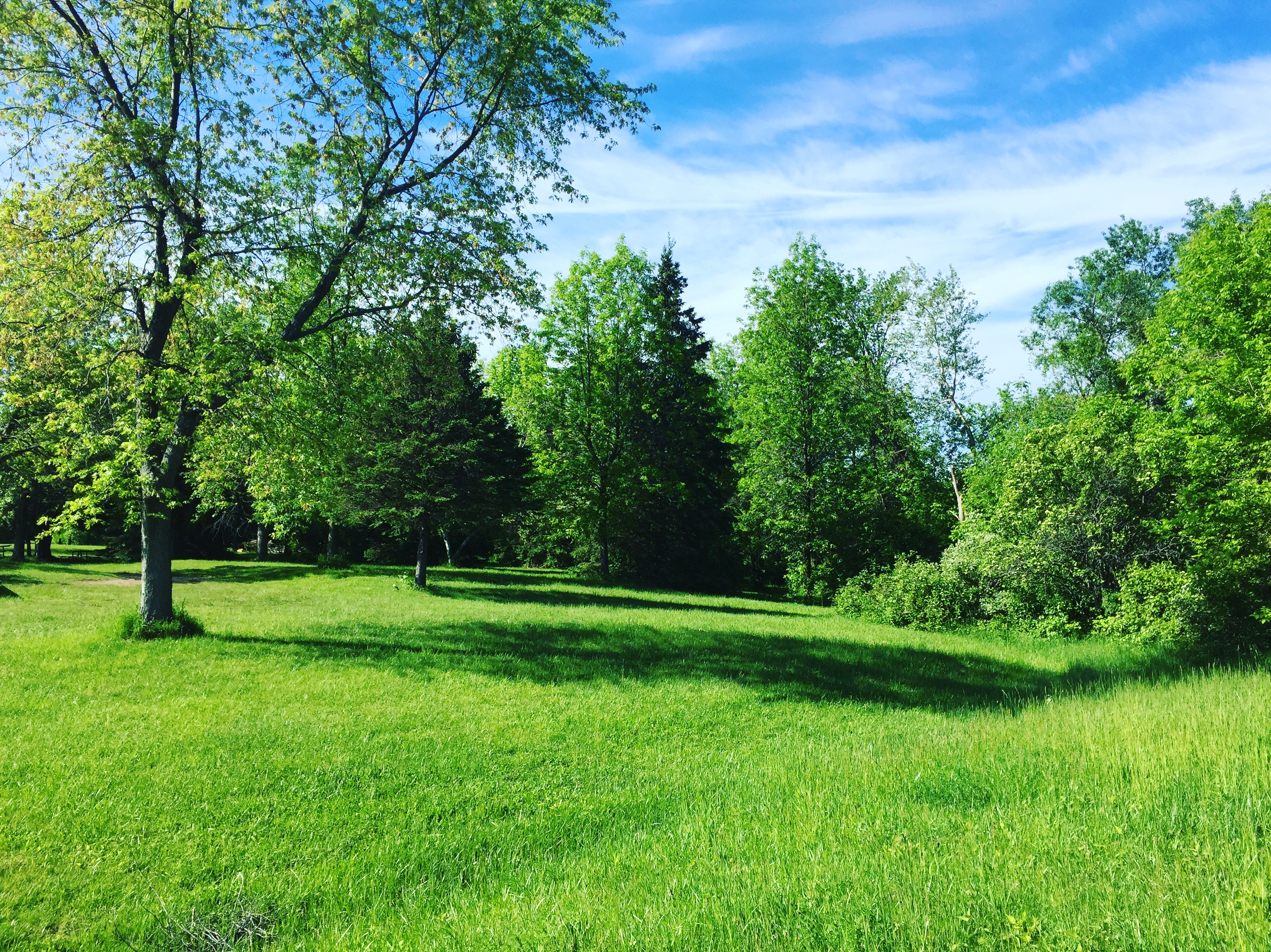
Summer 2017 at the park
