= Nipigon (disambiguation) =

Nipigon may refer to:

== Places in Thunder Bay District of Ontario, Canada ==
- Nipigon Township
- Lake Nipigon
- Lake Nipigon (electoral district)
- Nipigon River
- Nipigon Bay, northern-most bay of Lake Superior
- Nipigon Embayment
- Lake Nipigon Indian Reserve

== Canadian Navy ships ==
- HMCS Nipigon (J154), a Bangor-class minesweeper that served in World War II
- HMCS Nipigon (DDH 266), an Annapolis-class destroyer that served during the Cold War

== Other uses ==
- Nipigon (crater), an impact crater on Mars
- Point Nipigon, Michigan, an unincorporated community
