= Coldwell Complex =

Landform in Thunder Bay district, Ontario

Coordinates: 48.748°N 86.435°W

The Coldwell Complex is a large circular gabbro and syenite intrusion within the Earth's crust. Located on the North Shore of Lake Superior in Ontario, Canada, it is the largest alkaline intrusion in North America with a diameter of 25 km (16 mi).

== Formation ==
The Coldwell Complex has its origins in the Midcontinent Rift System about 1,100 million years ago. It is an exposed magma chamber that formed beneath the surface causing surface swelling to occur. This swelling turned into an active volcano, erupting basaltic magma. 600 million years ago, the volcano walls became so large and heavy, they caved in on the volcano, acting as a cap. The magma then became trapped in the magma chamber where it settled and cooled with other minerals causing the initial phases of the complex. Glacial erosion stripped away the top layers of the volcano. Today, the once-hot magma chamber is exposed to surface rock on the northern shore of Lake Superior.

== See also ==
- Volcanism of Canada
- Volcanism of Eastern Canada
- Midcontinent Rift System
- Duluth Complex
