= Gull River (Lake Nipigon) =

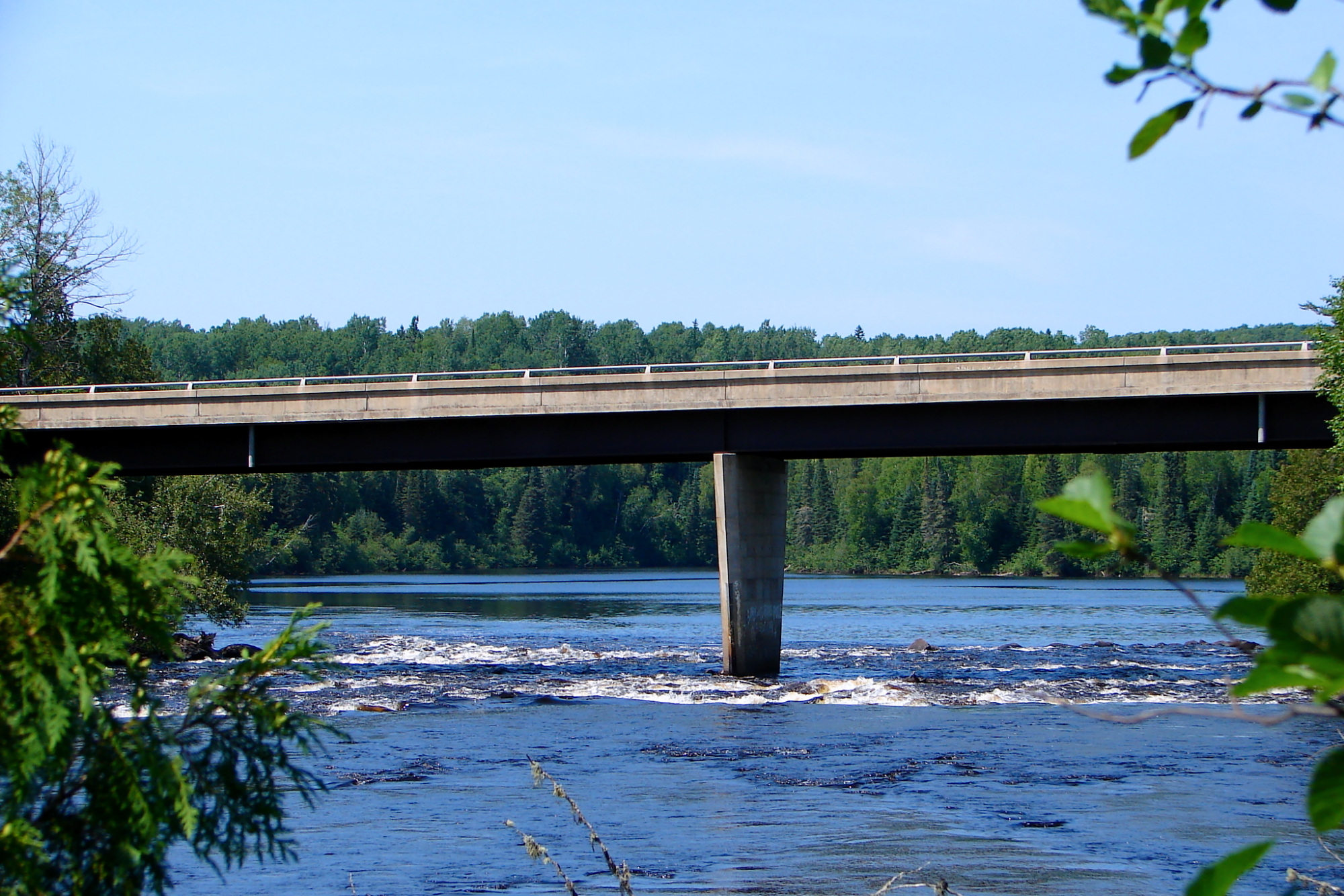
- Gull River at Hwy 527

- Location of the mouth of the Gull River in Ontario

Location
- Country: Canada
- Province: Ontario
- Region: Northwestern Ontario
- District: Thunder Bay

Physical characteristics
- Source: Unnamed lake
  - coordinates: 49°14′33″N 89°52′01″W
  - elevation: 494 m (1,621 ft)
- Mouth: Gull Bay (Lake Nipigon)
  - location: Gull Bay 55
  - coordinates: 49°49′14″N 89°05′19″W
  - elevation: 259 m (850 ft)

Basin features
- River system: Great Lakes Basin

The Gull River is a river in Thunder Bay District in Northwestern Ontario, Canada. The river is in the Great Lakes Basin and is a tributary of Lake Nipigon.

The river is a cold water system, with a number of rapids and waterfalls. The lower 24 km (15 mi) and upper reaches of the river consist of sandy, meandering portions, with numerous loops and oxbow lakes. Its middle section is in a morainal-dominated valley with narrow straight channels where whitewater sections flow over bedrock.

The Gull River is a documented canoe route, linking interior lakes such as Garden and Mooseland Lakes to Lake Nipigon. From Garden Lake Road (Highway 811) to Highway 527, the route is about 100 kilometres (62 mi) long, taking between 5 and 8 days. There are 15 documented portages and few campsites, which are not signed and see little to no maintenance. It is only recommended for experienced paddlers with whitewater skills.

== Geography ==
The river flows from an unnamed lake to Gull Bay on the western side of Lake Nipigon. The river passes through Gull River 55 Indian reserve of the Gull Bay First Nation, located on the south shore of Lake Nipigon.

=== Tributaries ===
Significant tributaries of the Gull River are (in upstream order):

- Voltaire Creek
- Crazy Creek
- Drunk Creek
- Awl Creek
- Pantagruel Creek
  - Rabelais Creek
- Roaring River
- Mooseland River
  - Armistice Creek
  - Garden Lake
  - Mooseland Lake
- Heaven Creek

== History ==
In 1850, the Robinson Superior Treaty was signed that created the Gull River 55 reserve for the Gull Bay First Nation at the mouth of the Gull River. That same year, the Hudson's Bay Company moved its trading post there from Wabinosh Bay. The post, known as Nipigon or Fort Nipigon, was headquarters of the Nipigon District from 1881 to 1892. In 1900, the post was renamed to Nipigon House, and renamed again in 1954 to Gull Bay.

== Fauna ==
Native fish species are walleye, yellow perch, and northern pike, with lake sturgeon found spawning in the lower portion of the Gull River, east of Detour Lake.

== Gull River Provincial Park ==
Gull River Provincial Park
- IUCN category II (national park)
- Location: Thunder Bay District, Ontario, Canada
- Coordinates: 49°41′41″N 89°26′31″W
- Area: 7,194 ha (27.78 sq mi)
- Designation: Waterway
- Established: 2003
- Governing body: Ontario Parks
- Website: www.ontarioparks.ca/park/gullriver

The Gull River Provincial Park protects an 80 kilometres (50 mi) long section of the Gull River, as well as part of its tributary Mooseland River, from Highway 811 in the west to the boundary of Gull River 55 Reserve of the Gull Bay First Nation in the east. The park, located about 160 kilometres (99 mi) north of Thunder Bay, is notable for its multi-day canoe camping opportunities.

In addition to the Gull River itself and Mooseland River tributary, the park also protects a large swatch of land around the Gull River headwaters, that nearly surround the 780 hectares (1,900 acres) Kaiashk Provincial Nature Reserve (which may be added to Gull River Provincial Park in the future). The remainder of the Mooseland River, its headwaters, and Mooseland Lake, are protected in the 12,586 hectares (31,100 acres) Garden Pakashkan Conservation Reserve. Furthermore, the Ottertooth Conservation Reserve abuts the Gull River Provincial Park on both sides southwest of Detour Lake.

The landscape in Gull River Provincial Park is characterized by boreal forests with deciduous-dominated mixedwood and jack pine/black spruce mixed stands, as well as wetlands, marshes, and fens. Common trees found in the park are trembling aspen, white birch, white spruce, black spruce, jack pine, balsam fir, and tamarack.

The park has minimal existing development, and no transmission lines, gas pipeline corridors, or major roads cutting across. It is a non-operating park, meaning that there are no facilities or services for visitors. The park can be used for canoeing, hunting, and fishing.

Mammals found in the park include black bear, fisher, lynx, mink, moose, pine marten, red fox, snowshoe hare, and timber wolf.

== See also ==
- List of rivers of Ontario
- Kopka River - river just to the north with similar canoeing opportunities, also protected in a provincial park

== Sources ==
- Map 13 (PDF) (Map). 1 : 1,600,000. Official road map of Ontario. Ministry of Transportation of Ontario. 2010-01-01.
