= Obonga–Ottertooth Provincial Park =

Provincial park in Ontario

- IUCN category II (national park)
- Location within Ontario
- Location: Thunder Bay District, Ontario, Canada
- Coordinates: 49°53′02″N 89°37′54″W
- Area: 21,157 ha (81.69 sq mi)
- Designation: Waterway
- Established: 2003
- Governing body: Ontario Parks
- Website: www.ontarioparks.ca/park/obongaottertooth

The Obonga–Ottertooth Provincial Park is located about 200 kilometres (120 mi) north of Thunder Bay, in Ontario, Canada. It protects a 100 kilometres (62 mi) long stretch of lakes and streams between Obonga Lake in the east and Kashishibog Lake in the west, mostly following the Kashishibog River (a tributary of the Brightsand River) and Ottertooth Creek (a tributary of the Kopka River). The park is notable as an important recreational link between Brightsand River Provincial Park, Kopka River Provincial Park, and the Lake Nipigon basin.

Major lakes in the park include Hawn, Kashishibog, Kershaw, Obonga, Savage, Survey, and Tommyhow Lakes. The height-of-land between Hawn and Tommyhow Lakes divides the Arctic and Atlantic watersheds.

== Description ==
The park is characterized by a rough, hilly landscape with boreal forests, mixed with extensive sand and gravel deposits and low rocky outcrops. Its vegetation is mostly jack pine, with black spruce in swampy areas. The park is a significant habitat for woodland moose, including a calving area just west of Kashishibog Lake.

The park is a non-operating park, meaning that there are no services for visitors and minimal facilities. The park can be used for backcountry camping, canoeing, boating, hunting, and fishing. In particular, it provides remote wilderness canoeing opportunities, although the canoe routes through the park are not regularly maintained. The canoe route through the Ottertooth Creek canyon is especially difficult and seldom travelled, but rewarding for its "unusual and spectacular scenery of rapids, waterfalls, talus boulders and steep canyons". It is likely that Edward Umfreville, an 18th-century explorer, passed through this canyon while searching for an alternate canoe route from Lake Superior to Lake Winnipeg in 1784. Although Umfreville succeeded, his route was never adopted by other fur traders who used a route via the Kaministiquia River instead.

The park is for a large part within the Lake Nipigon watershed, an area designated as the Lake Nipigon Basin Signature Site, known for its remarkable range of natural and recreational values that includes several provincial parks, conservation reserves, and management areas around Lake Nipigon. The Obonga–Ottertooth Provincial Park connects with Kopka River Provincial Park at Kashishibog and Obonga Lakes, forming a huge waterway park loop.
