= Kopka River =

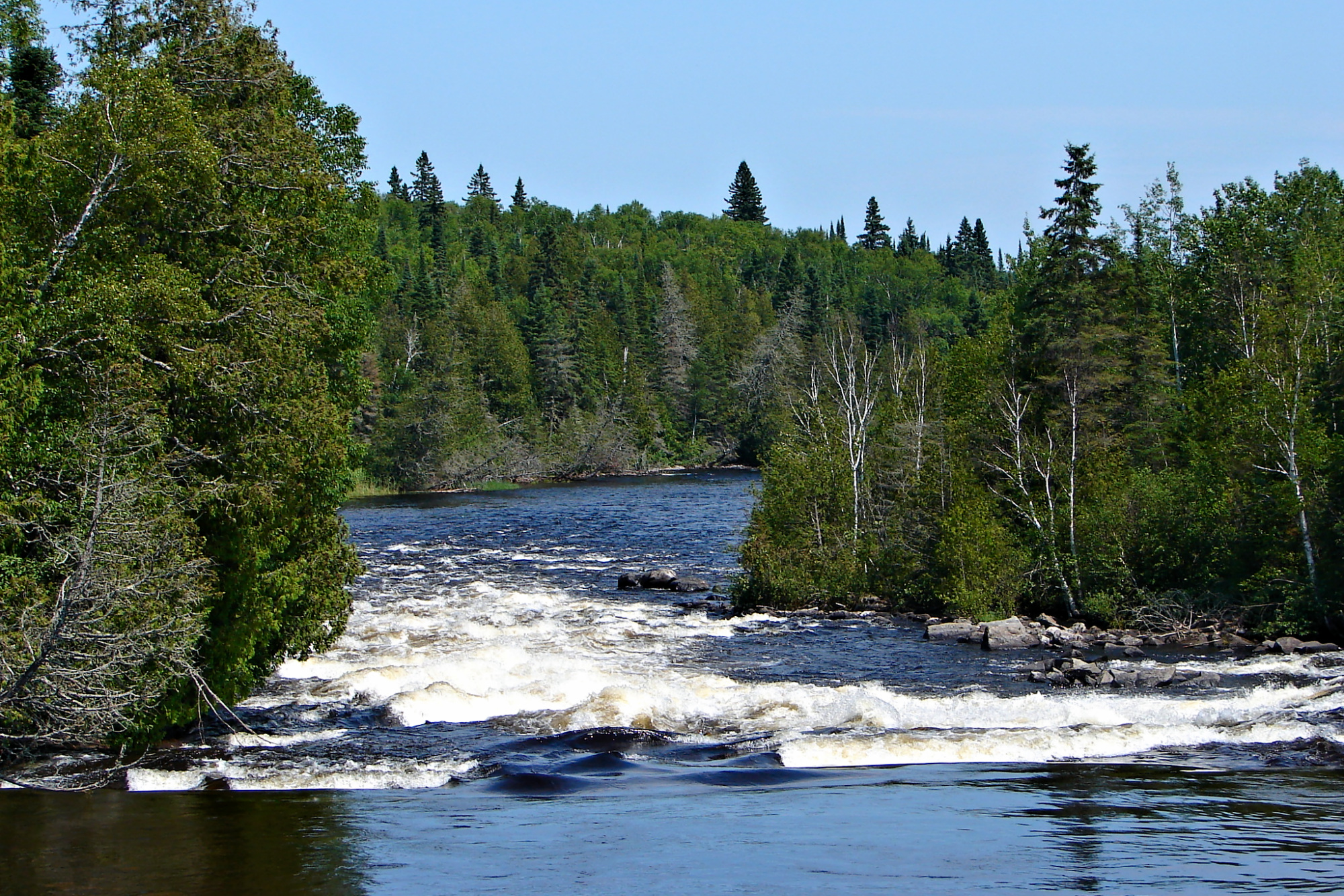

- Location within Ontario

Location
- Country: Canada
- Province: Ontario
- District: Thunder Bay

Physical characteristics
- Source: Redsand Lake
  - coordinates: 49°48′21″N 90°04′14″W
  - elevation: 449 m (1,473 ft)
- Mouth: Wabinosh Lake
  - coordinates: 50°03′15″N 89°00′57″W
  - elevation: 263 m (863 ft)

Basin features
- Progression: Wabinosh Lake→ Wabinosh River→ Lake Nipigon→ Nipigon River→ Lake Superior
- River system: Great Lakes Basin

The Kopka River is a river in northwestern Ontario, Canada. It forms at the height-of-land west of Lake Nipigon, flowing through rugged wilderness of Ontario's northern boreal forest, and drains into Wabinosh Lake.

The indigenous name "Kopka" means "high rock".

The river is accessible via Highway 527 that crosses the river at the outlet of Kopka Lake, as well as Graham Road, a forest access road at the western boundary of the Kopka River Provincial Park.

== Description ==
Among the larger lakes that Kopka River flows through are Kenakskaniss, Wigwasan, and Bukemiga Lakes. Between Kenakskaniss and Wigwasaus, the river drops 76 metres (250 ft) in a series of rapids and cascades over a distance of about 1.6 kilometres (1 mi). Other big lakes include Obonga and Kopka Lakes.

The Kopka River is notable for its rapids and the whitewater canoeing opportunities this provides. Its entire course is an official canoe route of the Ministry of Natural Resources and protected in the Kopka River Provincial Park. But due to its remoteness, strong rapids, and difficult unmarked portages (which receive little maintenance), canoeists must be considerably skilled. In 2005, the wife of nature writer Gary Ferguson died in an accident while canoeing strong rapids on the Kopka River.

== Provincial Park ==
Kopka River Provincial Park
- IUCN category II (national park)
- Coordinates: 50°10′00″N 89°29′57″W
- Area: 31,205.00 ha (120.4832 sq mi)
- Designation: Waterway
- Established: 1989
- Governing body: Ontario Parks
- Website: www.ontarioparks.com/park/kopkariver

The Kopka River Provincial Park is a linear waterway park that includes a 200 metres (660 ft) wide strip of land on both sides of the Kopka River. In addition to protecting the entire length of the Kopka River, the park also includes the shores of Wabinosh Lake and Wabinosh Bay on the western side of Lake Nipigon, as well as a section of the Kashishibog River from Kashishibog Lake to its mouth at the Brightsand River (the remainder of this river is within Obonga-Ottertooth Provincial Park). In 2018, 93 hectares (230 acres) between Lake Nipigon and Wabinosh Lake were added to the park, which were previously designated as a forest reserve.

It is a non-operating park, with 20 backcountry campsites provided. Some fly-in fishing and hunting services are offered by commercial outfitters. The park can be used for recreational activities such as boating, backcountry camping, canoeing, fishing, and hunting. Two years after its establishment, the park had not yet been inventoried in detail, but the potential for the existence of archaeological sites in the park was considered high.

The park is part of the Lake Nipigon Basin Signature Site, an area remarkable for its range of natural and recreational values that include several provincial parks, conservation reserves, and management areas around Lake Nipigon. It bordes on Wabakimi Provincial Park to the north and Brightsand River Provincial Park to the west. It also connects with Obonga-Ottertooth Provincial Park at Kashishibog and Obonga Lakes, forming a huge waterway park loop.

== See also ==
- Black Sturgeon River (Thunder Bay District) - nearby river, also part of the Lake Nipigon Basin Signature Site
- Gull River (Lake Nipigon) - river just to the south with similar canoeing opportunities, also protected in a provincial park
