= Gary Ferguson =

Gary Ferguson may refer to:

- Gary Ferguson (literature scholar), professor of French Renaissance literature and culture
- Gary Ferguson (nature writer) (born 1956), American nature writer
- Gary Ferguson (musician)
