= Lake Nipigon =

Lake in Ontario, Canada

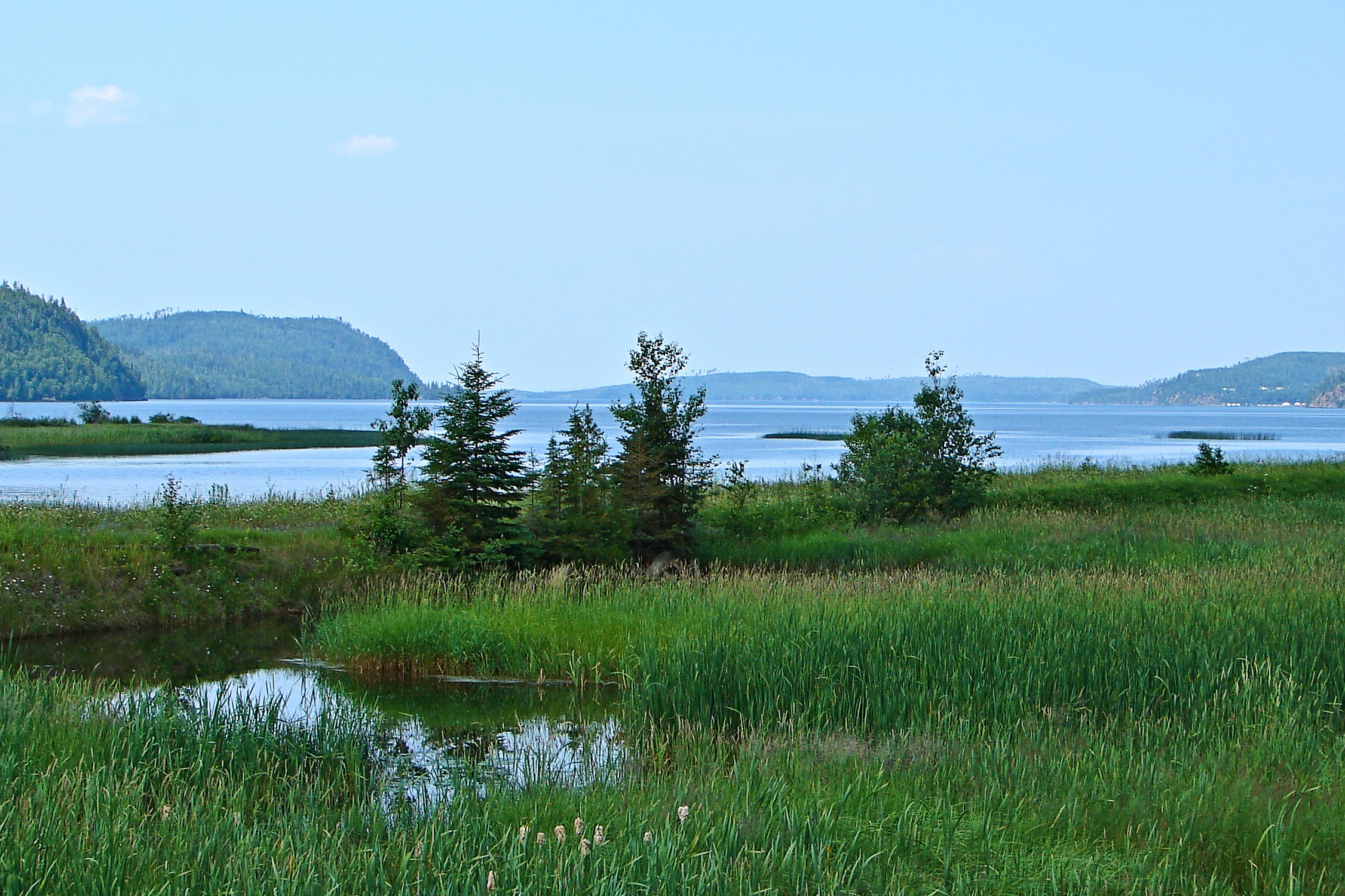
- View of the lake from Orient Bay

- Location within Ontario
- Location: Ontario
- Coordinates: 49°49′24″N 88°31′05″W
- Lake type: Glacial
- Primary inflows: Gull, Wabinosh, Whitesand, Little Jackfish, Ombabika, Onaman, Namewaminikan rivers
- Primary outflows: Nipigon River
- Catchment area: 24,560 km^{2} (9,484 mi^{2})
- Basin countries: Canada
- Surface area: 4,848 km^{2} (1,872 sq mi)
- Average depth: 54.9 m (180 ft)
- Max. depth: 165 m (541 ft)
- Water volume: 266 km^{3} (64 cu mi; 216×10^{6} acre⋅ft)
- Shore length^{1}: 1,044 km (649 mi)
- Surface elevation: 260 m (850 ft)
- Islands: Caribou, Geikie, Katatota, Kelvin, Logan, Murchison, Murray, and Shakespeare islands
- ^{1} Shore length is not a well-defined measure.

Lake Nipigon (/ˈnɪpɪɡɒn/ NIP-ih-gon; French: lac Nipigon; Ojibwe: Animbiigoo-zaaga'igan) is a freshwater lake in Northwestern Ontario. Part of the Great Lakes drainage basin, it drains through the Nipigon River into Lake Superior. It is the largest lake entirely within the Canadian province of Ontario.

== Etymology ==
In the Jesuit Relations (the chronicles of the Jesuit missions in New France), the lake is called Lac Alimibeg, and was subsequently known as Alemipigon or Alepigon. In the 19th century it was frequently spelled as Lake Nepigon. This may have originated from the Ojibwe word Animbiigoong, meaning 'at continuous water' or 'at waters that extend [over the horizon].' Though some sources claim the name may also be translated as 'deep, clear water,' this description is for Lake Temagami. Today, the Ojibwe bands call Lake Nipigon Animbiigoo-zaaga'igan.

The 1778 Il Paese de' Selvaggi Outauacesi, e Kilistinesi Intorno al Lago Superiore map by John Mitchell identifies the lake as Lago Nepigon and its outlet as F. Nempissaki. In the 1807 map A New Map of Upper & Lower Canada by John Cary, the lake was called Lake St. Ann or Winnimpig, while the out flowing river as Red Stone R. Today, the Red Rock Indian Band located along the Nipigon River still bears the "Red Stone" name. In the 1827 map Partie de la Nouvelle Bretagne. by Philippe Vandermaelen, the lake was called L. St. Anne, while the out flowing river as R. Nipigeon. In the 1832 map North America sheet IV. Lake Superior. by the Society for the Diffusion of Useful Knowledge, the lake was called S^{t} Ann or Red L., while the out flowing river as Neepigeon and the heights near the outlet of the Gull River as Neepigon Ho. By 1883, maps such as Statistical & General Map of Canada by Letts, Son & Co., consistently began identify the lake as Lake Nipigon.

== Geography ==
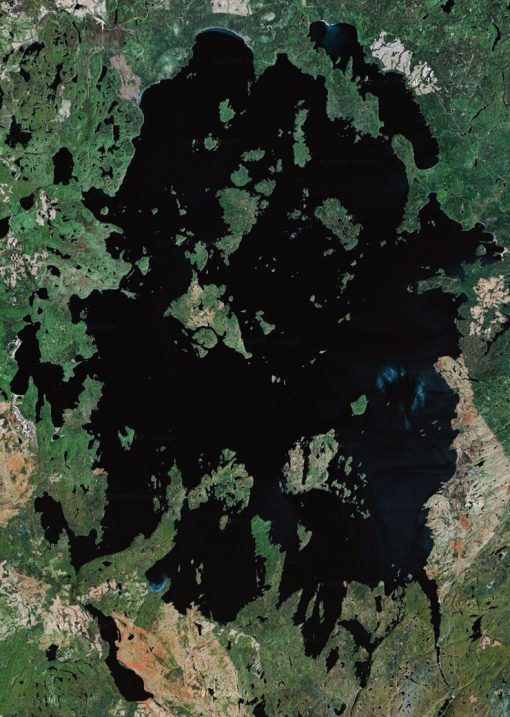
Satellite view of Lake Nipigon

Lying 260 metres (850 ft) above sea level, the lake drains into the Nipigon River and thence into Nipigon Bay of Lake Superior. The lake and river are the largest tributaries of Lake Superior. It lies about 120 kilometres (75 mi) northeast of the city of Thunder Bay, Ontario.

Lake Nipigon has a total area (including islands within the lake) of 4,848 square kilometres (1,872 sq mi), compared to 3,150 square kilometres (1,220 sq mi) for Lake of the Woods. It is the 30th largest lake in the world by area. The largest islands are Caribou Island, Geikie Island, Katatota Island, Kelvin Island, Logan Island, Murchison Island, Murray Island, and Shakespeare Island. Maximum depth is 165 metres (541 ft).

Its original watershed area is 24,560 square kilometres (9,484 mi^{2}). This was increased by about 60% to 38,920 square kilometres (15,030 sq mi) after 14,360 square kilometres (5,545 mi^{2}) of the Ogoki River basin were diverted in 1943 to the headwaters of the Little Jackfish River, a tributary of Lake Nipigon.

== Geology ==
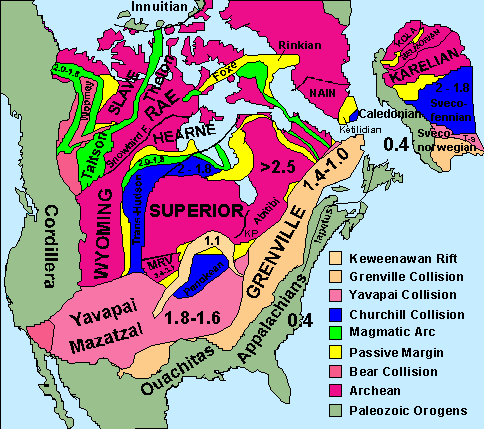
Geological map of North America showing (in beige) the Midcontinent Rift, here labelled Keweenawan Rift.

Lake Nipigon occupies a basin created by repeated and preferential erosion of relatively flat-lying and faulted, Proterozoic sedimentary strata and igneous sills by repeated Pleistocene glaciations. The Sibley Group consists of about 950 m (3,120 ft) of unmetamorphosed Mesoproterozoic red beds that are typically flat-lying. These red beds consist of basal fluvial-lacustrine conglomerates, sandstones, and shales overlain by cyclic dolomite-siltstone layers, stromatolites and red mudstones, which represent a playa lake, sabkha, and mudflat environments; purple shales and siltstones interpreted as subaerial mudflat deposits; and an upper unit of cross-stratified sandstone beds, which are interpreted to be aeolian in origin. They accumulated in an intracratonic rift basin between 1450 and 1500 million years (Ma) ago.

The Sibley Group unconformably overlies highly deformed and metamorphosed Archean turbiditic sandstones and metavolcanic and granitic rocks. The strata of the Sibley Group fill and are limited to a rift basin known as the Nipigon Embayment that underlies Lake Nipigon. Outside of the rift basin and east and west of Lake Nipigon, the Sibley Group is absent and erosion resistant Archean rocks are either exposed at the surface or blanketed by Pleistocene glacial sediments.

The Archean and Proterozoic strata are intruded by a number of mafic and ultramafic intrusions, which define the current outline of the Nipigon Embayment. They consist of relatively flat-lying and undeformed diabase sills known as the Nipigon diabase sills. These sills range in thickness from a few meters to 150 metres (490 ft) thick in cliff sections to more than 250 metres (820 ft) thick in drill core. They are estimated to cover an area in excess of 20,000 square kilometres (7,700 sq mi). The Nipigon diabase sills give evidence of rift-related continental basaltic magmatism during the Midcontinent Rift System event, estimated at 1,109 Ma ago. Thick sills up to 150 to 200 metres (490–660 ft) thick are also related with the rifting event, forming cliffs that are up to 150 to 200 metres (490–660 ft) high. The mafic and ultramafic intrusions in and around the Nipigon Embayment have widely been interpreted to represent a failed arm of the Midcontinent Rift System, although the lack of dike intrusions, compared to the relative abundance of flat, saucer-shaped sills in the embayment, has led some researchers to question the dominant failed rift arm model.

The Proterozoic rocks that underlie the Lake Nipigon region contain a variety of mineral resources. Although economic deposits have yet to be found, 1.53 billion-year-old anorogenic granites within the Lake Nipigon area potentially contain yttrium, zirconium, rare-earth elements and tin mineralization. The clastic sedimentary rocks of the Sibley Group, are host to unconformity-related uranium and red beds-type copper ore deposits.

== History ==
As the last ice age was ending, Lake Nipigon was, at times, part of the drainage path for Lake Agassiz.

=== French era (Fort la Tourette) ===
Claude-Jean Allouez, a French Jesuit missionary celebrated the first Mass beside the Nipigon River 29 May 1667. He visited the village of the Nipissing Indians who had fled there during the Iroquois onslaught of 1649-50.

In 1683, Daniel Greysolon, Sieur du Lhut, established a fur trading post on Lake Nipigon named Fort la Tourette after his brother, Claude Greysolon, Sieur de la Tourette. The Alexis Hubert Jaillot map of 1685 (Partie de la Nouvelle-France) suggests that this fort was somewhere in Ombabika Bay at the northeast end of the lake where the Ombabika River and Little Jackfish River (Kabasakkandagaming) empty. This post, like most of the western French posts, was closed in 1696 by order of the king, when, due to a surplus of beaver pelts, the system of trading permits established in 1681 was abolished.

On 17 April 1744, the Jean Frédéric Phélypeaux, Count of Maurepas, Minister of the Marine, informed the Canadian officials that Jean de La Porte was to be given the "fur ferme" (i.e. the profits) of Lac Alemipigon from that year forward as a reward for his services in New France.

=== Mid 18th and 19th century: British era ===
After the Treaty of Paris (1763), the area passed into the hands of the British, and the Hudson's Bay Company (HBC) expanded its trading area to include the Lake, to compete with the North West Company, who were already operating there. In 1784 and 1790, the HBC sent representatives to survey the lake, and set up their first trading post in 1792 on the north-east side. Around 1821, the HBC replaced the original post with a second one in the northwest, called Wabinosh House. It was nearly abandoned due to strife and murders between local indigenous groups. Once the dispute was resolved however, the post remained open.

Although it was considered to be within British North America, it was not until 1850 that the watershed draining into Lake Superior was ceded formally by the Ojibwe Indians to the Province of Canada in the Robinson Treaty of 1850, also known as the Robinson Superior Treaty. A reserve, 10 km^{2} (4 mi^{2}) in area, called Gull River 55, was set aside on Gull River near Lake Nipigon on both sides of the river for the Chief Mishe-muckqua (from Mishi-makwa, "Great Bear"). That same year, the HBC moved its trading post there from Wabinosh Bay. The post, known as Nipigon or Fort Nipigon, was headquarters of the Nipigon District from 1881 to 1892. In 1900, the post was renamed to Nipigon House, and renamed again in 1954 to Gull Bay.

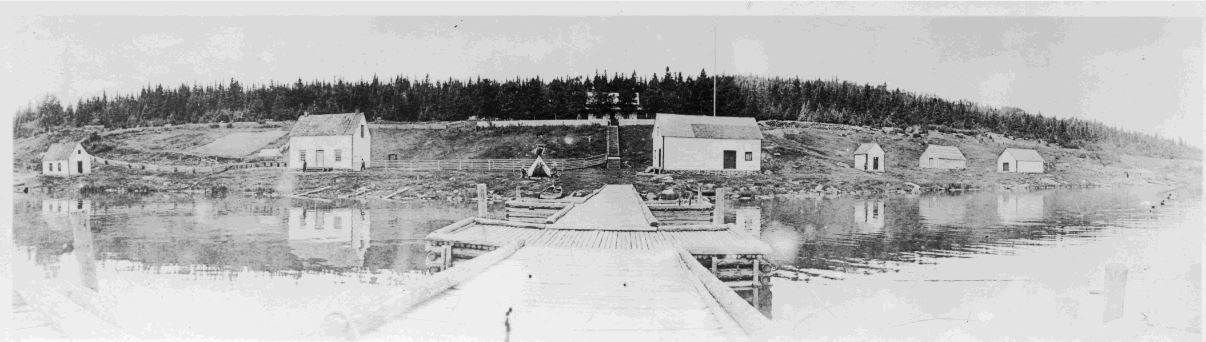
HBC trading post Nipigon House on Lake Nipigon, 1880s

In 1871 Lake Nipigon was included in the new Thunder Bay District.

=== 20th century ===
The Township of Nipigon was incorporated in 1908. The Municipality of Greenstone (pop 5662) was incorporated in 2001 and includes Orient Bay, MacDiarmid, Beardmore, Nakina, Longlac, Caramat, Jellicoe and Geraldton.

In 1943, Canada and the United States agreed to the Ogoki diversion which diverts water into Lake Superior that would normally flow into James Bay and thence into Hudson Bay. The diversion connects the upper portion of the Ogoki River to Lake Nipigon. This water was diverted to boost the Sir Adam Beck Hydroelectric Generating Stations at Niagara Falls. The diversion is governed by the International Lake Superior Board of Control which was established in 1914 by the International Joint Commission.

== First Nations ==
The First Nations population (primarily Ojibwe) include the band governments of Animbiigoo Zaagi'igan Anishinaabek (Lake Nipigon Ojibway) First Nation, the Biinjitiwaabik Zaaging Anishinaabek (formerly known as Rocky Bay First Nation), the Bingwi Neyaashi Anishinaabek (formerly known as Sand Point First Nation), the Red Rock Indian Band (also known as Lake Helen Reserve) and the Gull Bay First Nation. Formerly, the Whitesand First Nation was also located along the northwestern shores of Lake Nipigon until they were relocated in 1942. The membership of these six First Nations total about 5,000. Additionally along Lake Nipigon, there are three Indian reserves : McIntyre Bay IR 54 (Rocky Bay First Nation), Jackfish Island IR 57 and Red Rock (Parmachene) IR 53 (Red Rock First Nation).

The first nations CBC TV series Spirit Bay was filmed on the lake at the Biinjitiwaabik Zaaging Anishinaabek Reserve in the mid-1980s.

== Transportation ==
The main line of the Canadian National Railway (CNR) runs to the north of the lake. Another branch of the CNR touches the southeastern section of the lake at Orient Bay and Macdiarmid before heading inland to Beardmore. Ontario Highway 11 also skirts the southeastern section of the lake.

Water travel between Lake Nipigon and Lake Superior is impossible because of the existence of three dams that effectively hinder navigation, however portage trails are accessible.

== Protected areas ==
Ontario Parks has designated the area as the Lake Nipigon Basin Signature Site, because of its remarkable range of natural and recreational values. The site includes many provincial parks, conservation reserves, and enhanced management areas around the lake and within its watershed.

Protected areas on or at Lake Nipigon include:

- Lake Nipigon Provincial Park - located on the east side of Lake Nipigon. In 1999, the park boundary was amended to reduce the park area from 14.58 to 9.18 km^{2} (5.63 to 3.54 sq mi). The area removed from the park was deregulated and transferred to the Government of Canada for a reserve for the Sand Point First Nation.
- Lake Nipigon Conservation Reserve - 176,660 ha (436,500 acres) reserve, created in 2003, that includes all Crown islands and most of the shoreline of Lake Nipigon.
- Black Sturgeon River Provincial Park - includes the southern-most end of Black Sturgeon Bay of Lake Nipigon.
- Kabitotikwia River Provincial Park - 1,965 ha (4,860 acres) nature reserve at Gull Bay, created in 1985, protecting the wetlands at the mouth of the Kabitotikwia River.
- Kopka River Provincial Park - includes the entire shore of and the islands in Wabinosh Bay, on the lake's western shore.
- Livingstone Point Provincial Park - 1,800 ha (4,400 acres) nature reserve, created in 1985, protecting regionally rare arctic and alpine plants on a peninsula off the lake's eastern shore.
- West Bay Provincial Park - 1,120 ha (2,800 acres) nature reserve, created in 1985, protecting geological features on the north shore of the namesake bay.
- Windigo Bay Provincial Park - 8,378 ha (20,700 acres) nature reserve, created in 1989, protecting a migration corridor and wintering sites for woodland caribou on the north shore of the lake, west of the namesake bay.

Other protected areas within the lake's basin:

- Garden Pakashkan Conservation Reserve - includes the Mooseland River (a tributary of the Gull River), its headwaters, Garden Lake, and Mooseland Lake. The 12,586 ha (31,100 acres) reserve, established in 2004, protects extremely rugged terrain and canyons in a remote area. The headwaters of the Brightsand River are part of the reserve.
- Gull River Provincial Park - protecting the Gull River, a tributary to Lake Nipigon.
- Obonga–Ottertooth Provincial Park - 21,157 ha (52,280 acres) waterway park that includes a system of lakes and rivers from Obonga Lake in the east to Kashishibog Lake in the west.
- Kaiashk Provincial Park - 780 ha (1,900 acres) nature reserve, established in 1989, protecting post-glacial features such as a kame knoll, outwash plain, and troughs.
- Nipigon Palisades Conservation Reserve - 11,588.8 ha (28,637 acres) reserve, established in 2003, protecting a prominent geological canyon / ravine and tablelands. It also includes a major moose migration corridor (Cash Creek).
- Ottertooth Conservation Reserve - 28,793 ha (71,150 acres) reserve, established in 2003, protecting provincially-significant and unique geological features related to a spillway of glacial Lake Agassiz.
- Pantagruel Creek Provincial Park - 2,685 ha (6,630 acres) nature reserve, established in 1989, protecting Pantagruel Creek that formed part of the spillway of glacial Lake Agassiz.
- Whitesand Provincial Park - 11,337 ha (28,010 acres) waterway park, established in 2003, includes a system of lakes and rivers that links Wabakimi Provincial Park, Windigo Bay Provincial Park, and Lake Nipigon.
