= Gull Bay First Nation =

Gull River 55 Kiashke Zaaging
- Indian reserve
- Gull River Indian Reserve No. 55
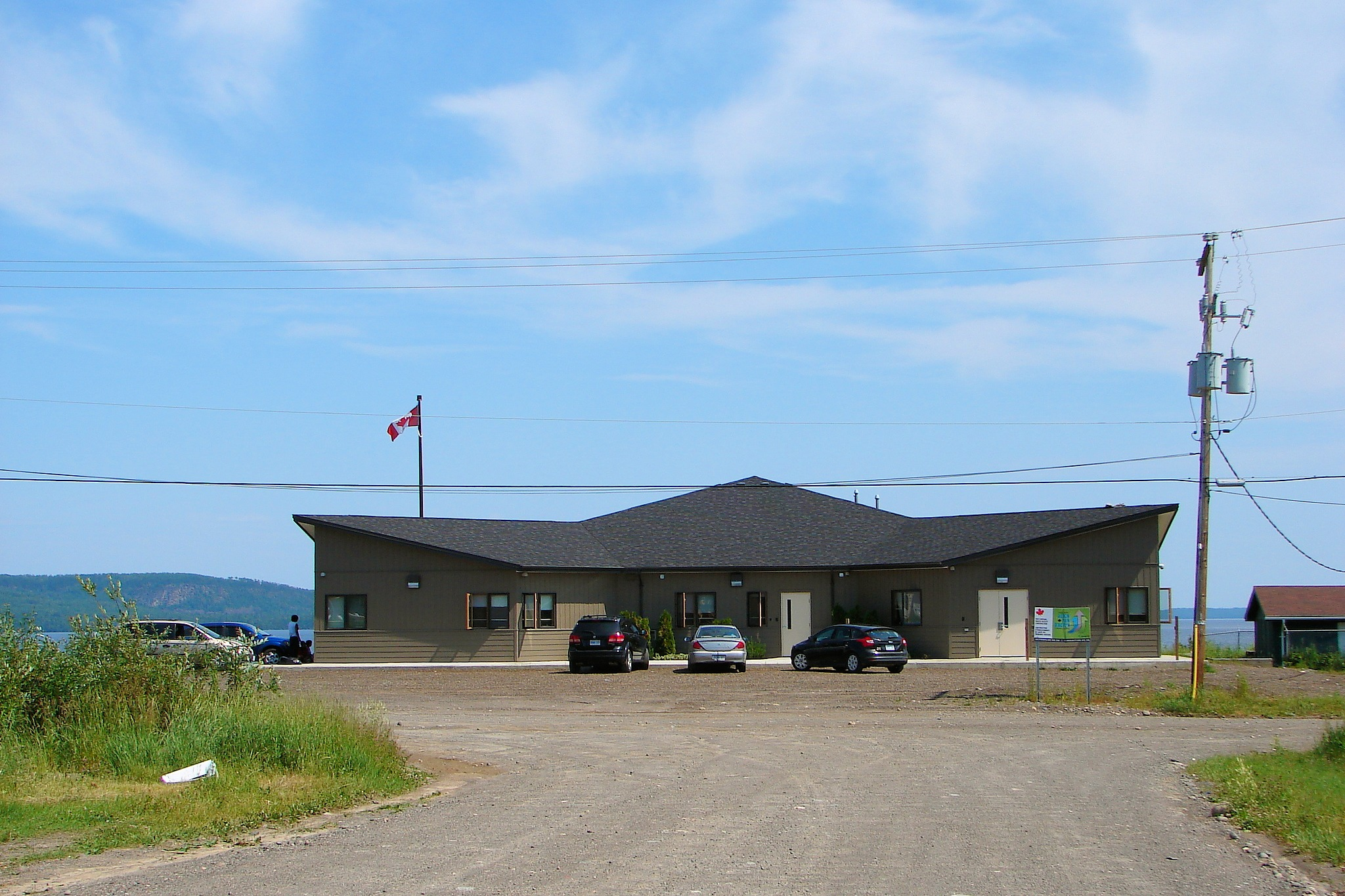

- Location within Ontario
- Coordinates: 49°49′N 89°06′W
- Country: Canada
- Province: Ontario
- District: Thunder Bay
- First Nation: Gull Bay

Area
  - Land: 39.77 km^{2} (15.36 sq mi)

Population (2021)
  - Total: 110
  - Density: 2.8/km^{2} (7.3/sq mi)
- Time zone: UTC-5 (EST)
  - Summer (DST): UTC-4 (EDT)

Gull Bay First Nation or Kiashke Zaaging Anishinaabek (Gayaashki-zaagiing Anishinaabeg in the Fiero orthography) is an Anishinaabe (Ojibway) First Nation band government located in Thunder Bay District in northwestern Ontario, Canada. It is approximately 175 kilometres (109 mi) north of Thunder Bay, Ontario on Highway 527 on the western shore of Lake Nipigon. As of May 2010, the First Nation had a registered population of 1,149 people, including an on-Reserve population of 328.

== Governance ==
The Chief and 10 Band Council members elected every 4 years under the First Nations Elections Act Electoral system. Before 2012, the council had 11 members but it was narrowed down to ten council members, with the passing of a council member. The current Chief is Wilfred King, whose first term began on January 12, 2013 (at the time, it was a 2-year term). The current councillors are Anthony Esquega, Brian King, Gwendoline King, Hugh King, Kenny King, Kevin King, Wayne King, Hector Murchinson, Roland Poile, Lawrence Shonias Sr, and Marcel Shonias. The next election will take place in November 2020.

As a signatory to the Robinson Superior Treaty of 1850, Kiashke Zaaging Anishinaabek is a member of the Nokiiwin Tribal Council, a Regional Chiefs Council, and the Union of Ontario Indians, a Political Territorial Organization that represents many of the Anishinaabe First Nation governments in Ontario located about Lake Superior and Lake Huron.

In August 2019, the community shut down its diesel electric generator for the first time in 60 years, drawing power from a new solar panel installation. Diesel is still used overnight.

=== List of Chiefs ===
- Wilfred King (December 14, 2000 to December 10, 2010)
- Miles Nowegejick (December 10, 2010 to January 12, 2013)
- Wilfred King (January 12, 2013 to present)

== Reserve ==
The Gull Bay First Nation has reserved for itself the 3,940 hectares (9,700 acres) Gull River 55 Indian Reserve. The community of Gull Bay is located on this reserve.

The reserve was created as part of the Robinson Superior Treaty in 1850. That same year, the Hudson's Bay Company (HBC) moved its trading post there from Wabinosh Bay (about 16 km (10 mi) to the north on Lake Nipigon). The post, known as Nipigon or Fort Nipigon, operated an outpost at Red Rock (now known as Nipigon) from 1864 to 1871. It was headquarters of the Nipigon District from 1881 to 1892. In 1900, the post was renamed to Nipigon House (to avoid confusion with Red Rock, which was renamed Nipigon), and renamed again in 1954 to Gull Bay. In 1959, the post became part of the HBC Northern Stores Department, which ran it as a "Northern Store" until it closed in 1972.

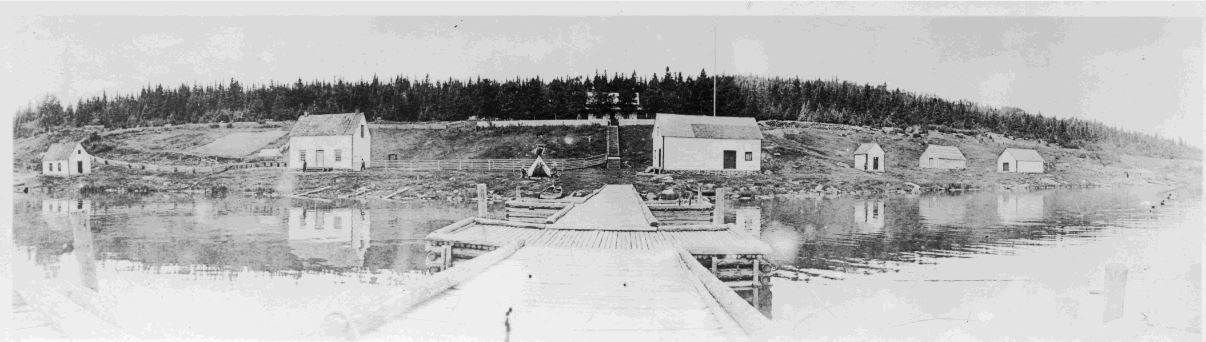
HBC trading post Nipigon House at Gull Bay, 1880s

== Land claims ==
=== Reserve size ===
The First nations signatories of the Robinson Superior Treaty were unfamiliar with the unit of the mile, and assumed it was the size of a league. The treaty gave each band a reserve of 16 square miles, which was much smaller than what the signatories expected. As soon as the error was noticed, the first nations notified the crown of the issue, and surveyors corrected the problem except for a few reserves, such as the Gull Bay First Nation, considered too far and too remote. The Gull Bay first nation filed a claim with the government of Canada on the issue of the size of their reserve in 2016.

=== Timber rights ===
In 2016, the band voted to accept a 8.1 million dollar settlement from the government over timber royalties on the reserve. Laurentian University historian Mark Kuhlberg has analyzed abuse of the First Nation's timber in his study, "Disturbing Synergy between inspector and inspected: the Gull Bay Case, 1916-1932," Papers of the 35th Algonquian Conference (Winnipeg: University of Manitoba, 2004, 207-238.
