= Mamainse Point Formation =

Coordinates: 47°2′N 84°47′W

The Mamainse Point Formation is a geologic formation in Algoma District in Northeastern Ontario, Canada. It is located 64 km (40 mi) north of Sault Ste. Marie along Lake Superior. The rocks comprising the Mamainse Point Formation are volcanic in origin, having been deposited by volcanism of the Midcontinent Rift System.

== See also ==
- Volcanism of Canada
- Volcanism of Eastern Canada
