= Midcontinent Rift System =

Geological rift in the center of the North American continent

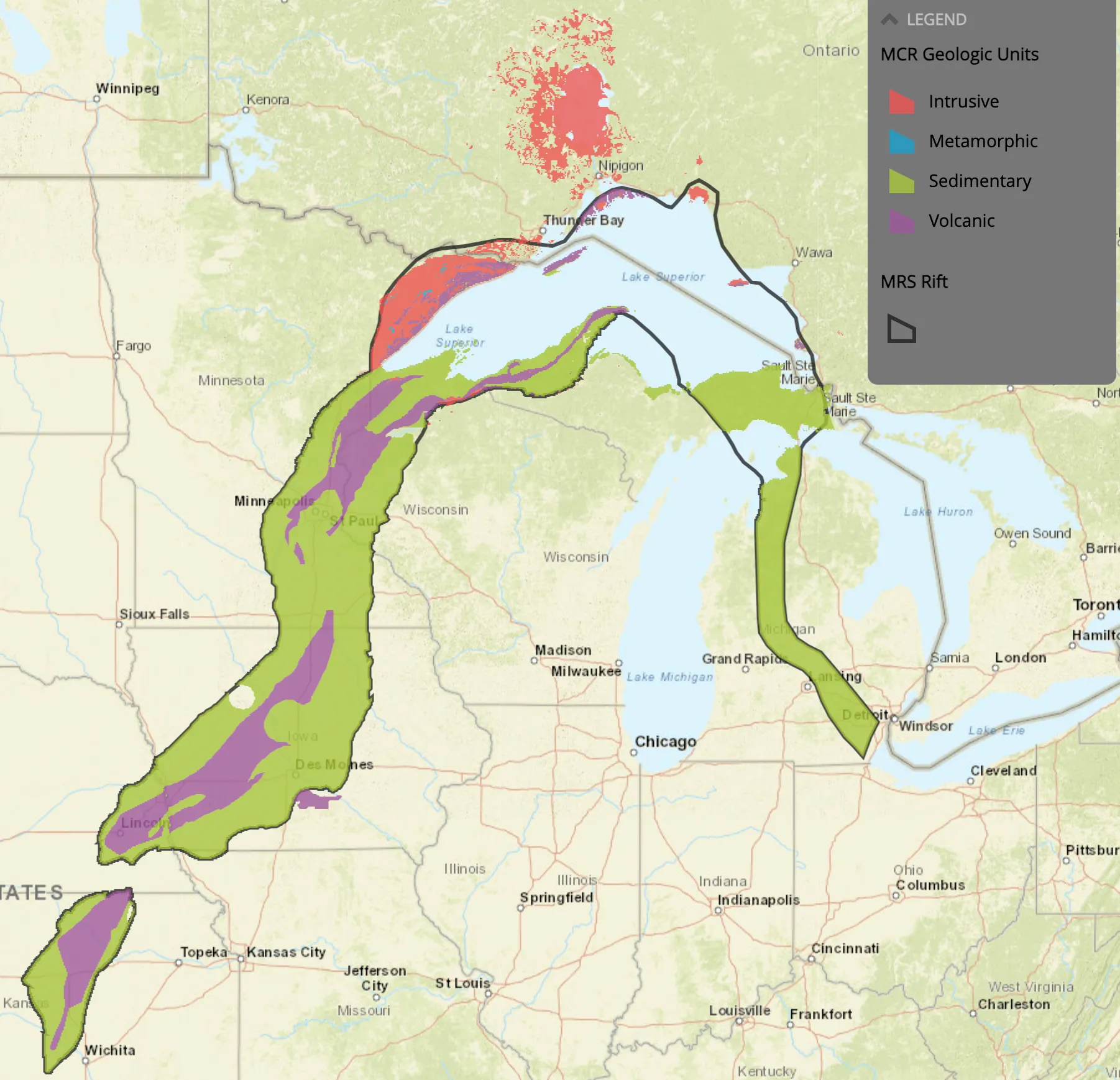
Midcontinent Rift System

The Midcontinent Rift System (MRS) or Keweenawan Rift is a 2,000 km (1,200 mi) long geological rift in the center of the North American continent and south-central part of the North American plate. It formed when the continent's core, the North American craton, began to split apart during the Mesoproterozoic Era of the Proterozoic Eon, about 1.1 billion years ago. The rift failed, leaving behind thick layers of igneous rock that are exposed in its northern reaches, but buried beneath later sedimentary formations along most of its western and eastern arms. Those arms meet at Lake Superior, which is contained within the rift valley. The lake's north shore in Ontario and Minnesota defines the northern arc of the rift. From the lake, the rift's eastern arm trends south to central lower Michigan, and possibly into Indiana, Ohio, Kentucky, Tennessee, and Alabama. The western arm runs from Lake Superior southwest through portions of Wisconsin, Minnesota, Iowa, and Nebraska to northeastern Kansas, and possibly into Oklahoma.

== Formation and failure ==
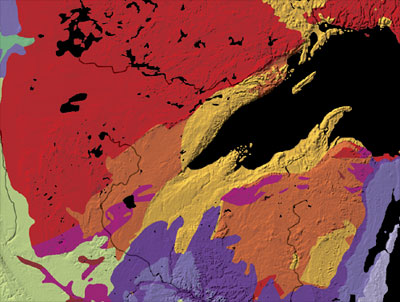
Rift rocks are exposed in the buff-colored areas around Lake Superior (black). The buff area on the north margin is the Lake Nipigon area.

The rock formations created by the rift included gabbro and granite intrusive rocks and basalt lavas. In the Lake Superior region, the upwelling of this molten rock may have been the result of a hotspot which produced a triple junction. The hotspot domed the rocks of the Lake Superior area. Voluminous basaltic lava flows erupted from the central axis of the rift, similar to the present-day rifting underway in the Afar Depression of the East African Rift system.

The southwest and southeast extensions represent two arms of the triple junction while a third failed arm extends north into Ontario as the Nipigon Embayment. This failed arm includes Lake Nipigon, Ontario.

The rift system may have been the result of extensional forces behind the continental collision of the Grenville Orogeny to the east which in part overlaps the timing of the rift development. Later compressive forces from the Grenville Orogeny likely played a major role in the rift's failure and closure. Had the rifting process continued, the eventual result would have been sundering of the North American craton and creation of a sea. The Midcontinent Rift appears to have progressed almost to the point where the ocean intruded. But after about 15–22 million years the rift failed. The Midcontinent Rift is the deepest closed or healed rift yet discovered; no known deeper rift ever failed to become an ocean.

== The rift today ==
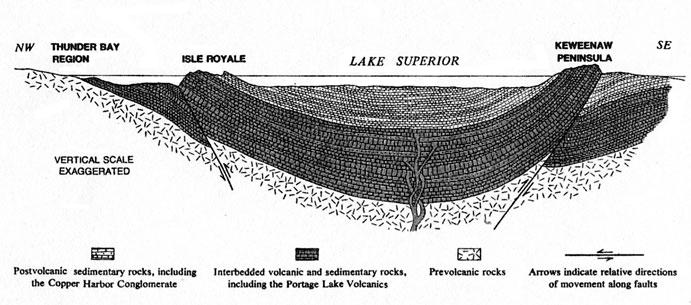
Volcanic strata protrude at Isle Royale and the Keweenaw Peninsula

Lake Superior occupies a basin created by the rift. Near the present lake, rocks produced by the rift can be seen on the surface of Isle Royale and the Keweenaw Peninsula of the Upper Peninsula of Michigan, northwest Wisconsin, and on the North Shore of Superior in Minnesota and Ontario. Similar rocks are exposed as far south as Interstate Park near Saint Paul, Minnesota, but elsewhere the rift is buried beneath more recent sedimentary rocks up to 9 km (6 mi) thick. Where buried, the rift has been mapped by gravity anomalies (its dense basaltic rock increases gravity locally), aeromagnetic surveys, and seismic data.

A slightly older but possibly related geologic feature is the 2,700,000 km^{2} (1,000,000 mi^{2}) Mackenzie Large Igneous Province in Canada, which extends from the Arctic in Nunavut to near the Great Lakes in Northwestern Ontario.

== Natural resources ==
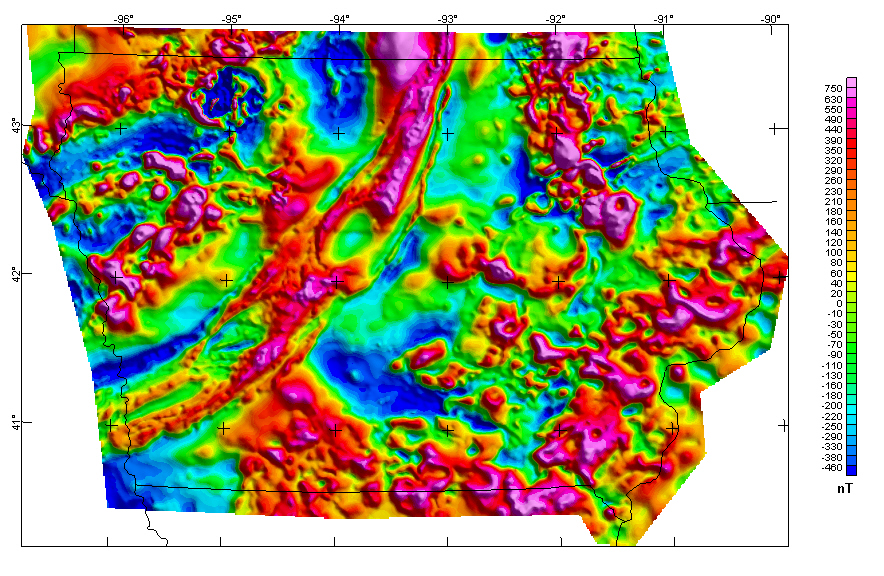
Iowa magnetic anomaly map showing the rift curving from the north center to the southwest of the state.

The Proterozoic Nonesuch Shale formation in the Keweenawan Rift contains enough organic carbon (greater than 0.5%) to be considered a potential source rock for petroleum. Oil identified as Precambrian has been found seeping out of the Nonesuch Shale in the White Pine mine in Michigan. A few deep wells were drilled to explore for oil and gas in rift rocks as far southwest as Kansas. No oil and gas were found, but the explorations did make some deep rock samples available. These include two "dry holes" drilled by Amoco: a 7,238 ft (2,206 m) well in Alger County, Michigan in 1987 and 1988, and one in Bayfield County, Wisconsin to a depth of 4,966 ft (1,514 m) in 1992. In 1987 Amoco also drilled a 17,851 ft (5,441 m) dry hole that penetrated rift sediments in Iowa.

The Michigan Copper Country in the Upper Peninsula and Isle Royale contains major native copper deposits in Keweenawan-age rocks associated with the rift. A copper mining industry was developed in Precolumbian times, reactivated in the 1840s and continued for more than a century. Some low-grade copper and nickel deposits, among the largest in the world, also exist in the Duluth Complex north of the lake. Once thought to be uneconomic to mine, these deposits have attracted renewed interest from resource companies.

=== White hydrogen ===
White hydrogen could be found or produced in the Mid-continental Rift System at scale for a renewable hydrogen economy. Water could be pumped down to hot iron-rich rock to produce hydrogen and the hydrogen could be extracted.

== Gallery ==
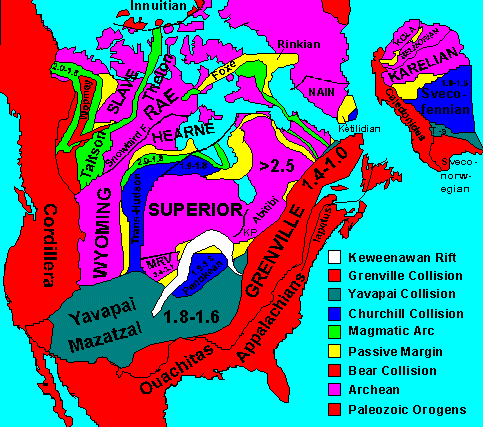
Geological map of North America showing the Midcontinent Rift in white, here labeled Keweenawan Rift. Lake Superior now occupies the apex of the rift; the section to its north marked "SUPERIOR" is the Superior Craton

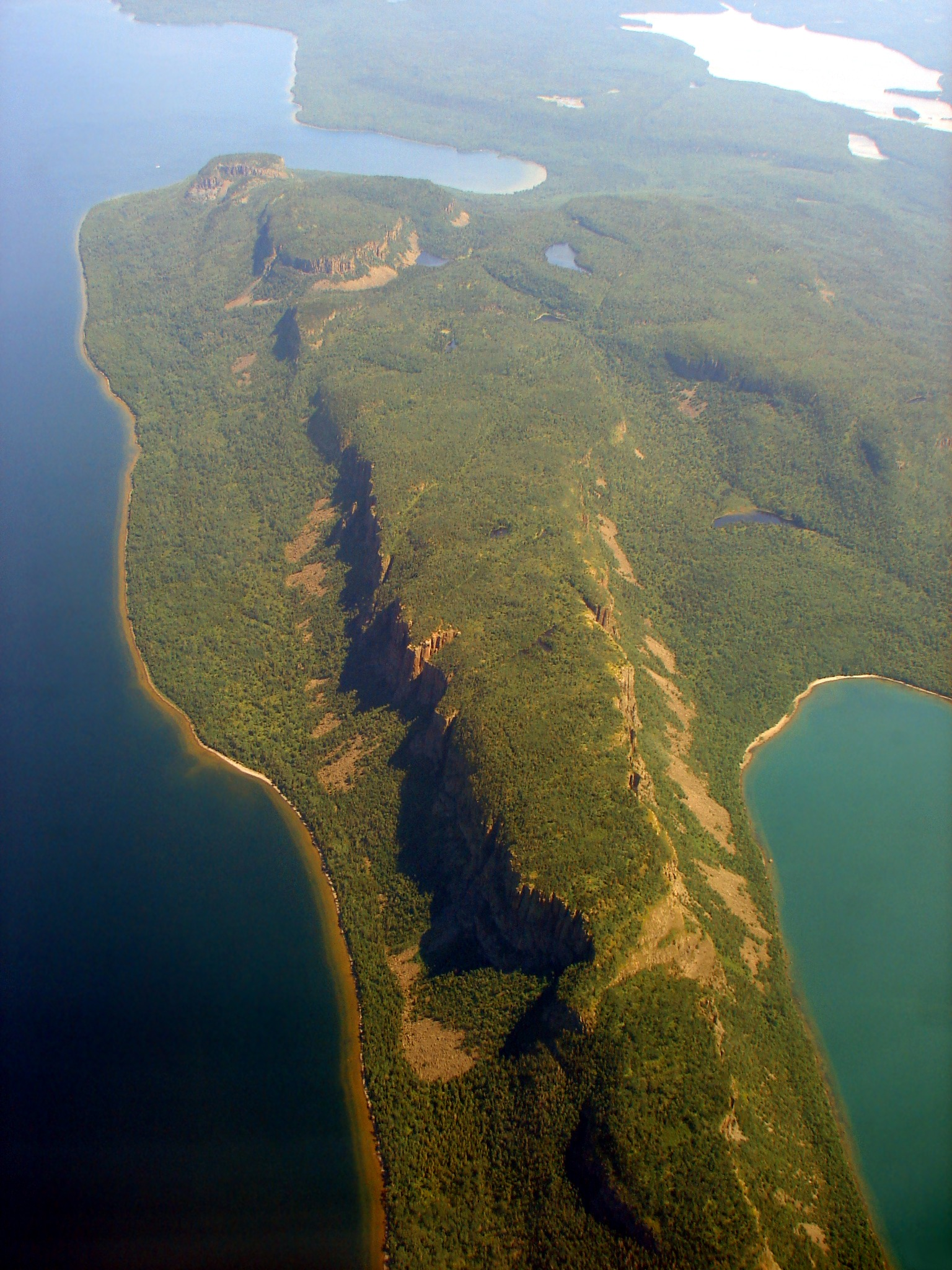
Sleeping Giant in Ontario

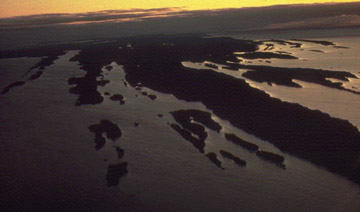
Eroded volcanic strata at Isle Royale in Michigan

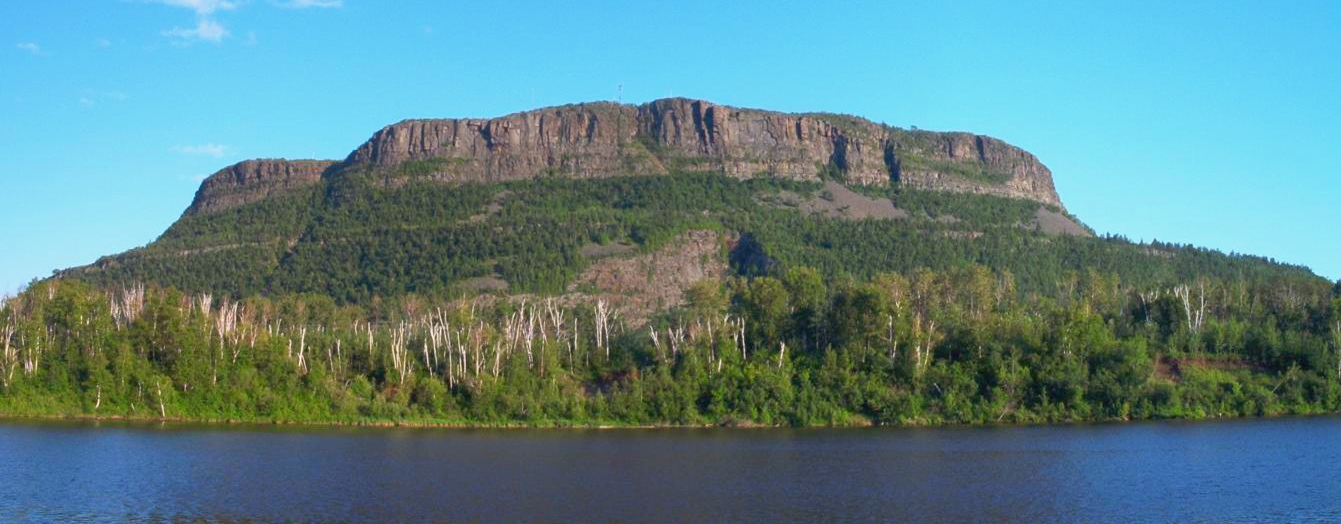
A mafic sill at Thunder Bay, Ontario

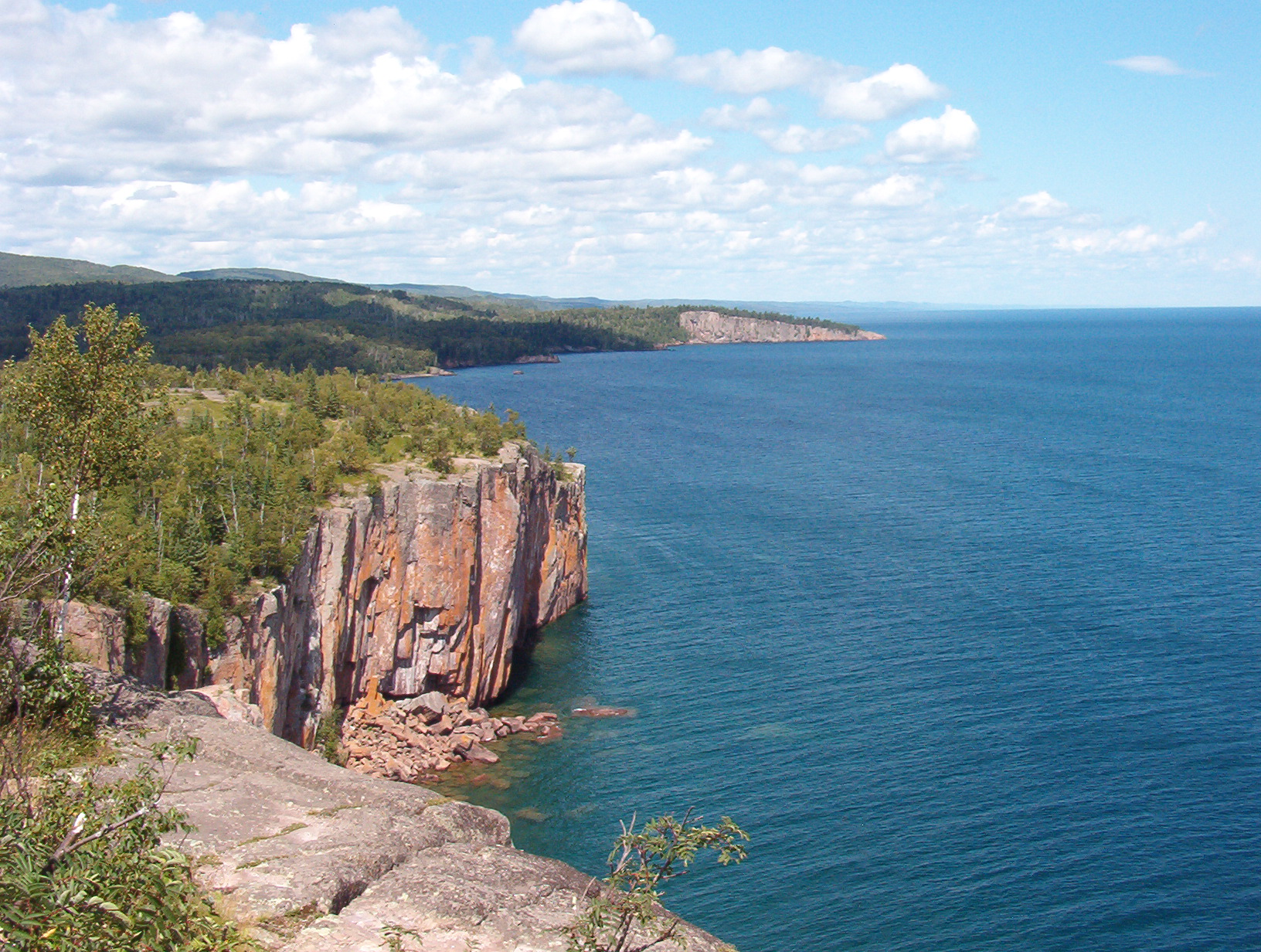
Cliffs at Palisade Head and Shovel Point in Minnesota

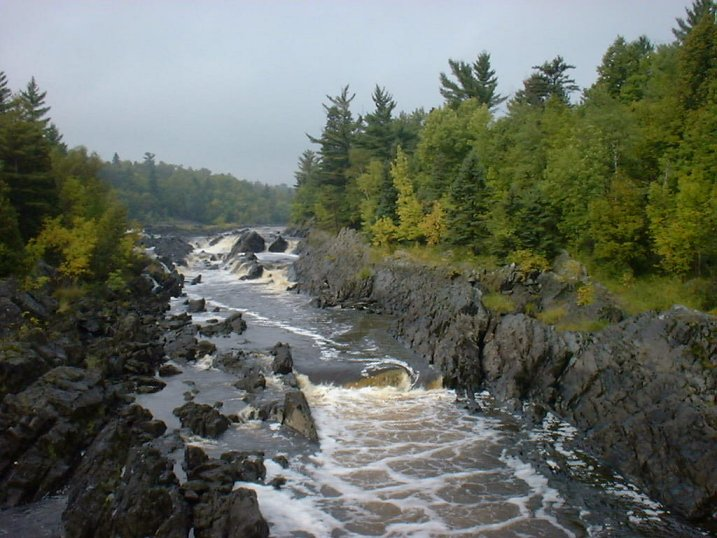
Saint Louis River in Jay Cooke State Park in Minnesota

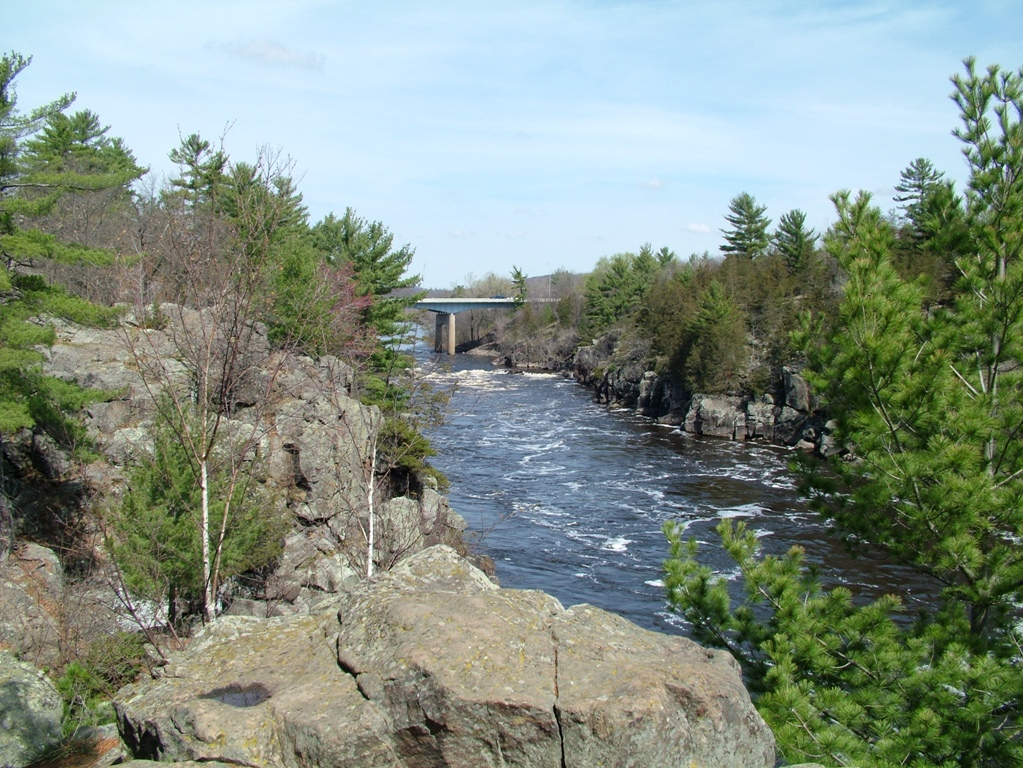
Dalles of the St. Croix River at Interstate State Park, Minnesota-Wisconsin

== See also ==
- Coldwell Complex – Landform in Thunder Bay district, Ontario
- Geology of Ontario
- Mamainse Point Formation
- Nemaha Ridge
- Volcanology of Canada – Volcanic activity in Canada
- Volcanology of Eastern Canada – Volcanic activity in Eastern Canada
- New drilling technologies
