= Gary Ferguson (nature writer) =

American writer

Gary Ferguson (born 1956) is an American writer. Ferguson is the author of more than 20 nonfiction books. His books have won awards from the Society of American Travel Writers, the High Plains Book Festival, and the Montana Book Award committee. His book Hawks Rest was the first book to be named Book of the Year by both the Pacific Northwest Booksellers Association and the Mountains and Plains booksellers association.

As a nature writer, his books focus on issues of ecology and conservation, with a particular focus on how people interact with nature. Gary is co-founder - along with his wife, social scientist Dr. Mary M. Clare - of "Full Ecology," an initiative meant to help people break down the barriers between the human psyche and the natural world.

== Life ==
Gary Ferguson grew up in South Bend, Indiana, and graduated from the University of Indiana in 1979. He worked as an interpretive naturalist for the U.S. Forest Service before embarking on his career as a freelance writer.

Ferguson's early career included hundreds of magazine articles as well as outdoor guidebooks such as Sawtooth Mountain Fun. He gradually shifted to more contemplative and research-oriented works such as Through the Woods: A Journey through America's Forests and The Great Divide: The Rocky Mountains in the American Mind. He has written frequently about Yellowstone National Park, with books such as Walking Down the Wild, Decade of the Wolf, and The Yellowstone Wolves: The First Year. He lived for a summer in the most remote spot in the continental United States to write the book Hawks Rest.

Ferguson was married for more than 20 years to the former Jane Stewart, whom he met at the University of Indiana. Jane died in a canoeing accident in Ontario's Kopka River in 2005. Ferguson wrote about the experience and his grief in the memoir The Carry Home.

Ferguson lives with his second wife, cultural psychologist Mary Clare, in Red Lodge, Montana, and Portland, Oregon.

== Significance ==
Author Rick Bass called Ferguson "one of the preeminent historians of the American West, and of the place and value of wilderness within that history." He's been lauded by writers including Pam Houston, Mark Spragg, Tim Cahill, and William Kittredge.

Booklist's Carl Hays said of The Carry Home (2014): "Elegiac and deeply moving, Ferguson's memoir is both a heartfelt eulogy to his late, beloved wife and an introspective meditation on the healing power of nature over grief." Publishers Weekly added that "Though there is grief in this remarkable tribute, the net effect is more joy -than sadness." Kirkus Reviews called it "A sprawling, lovely, nourishing tonic for all those who dip into it."

Publishers Weekly called Decade of the Wolf (2005) "a compelling inside look at the Yellowstone Wolf Recovery Project, covering the 10 years that have passed since the U.S. Fish and Wildlife Service made the controversial decision to reintroduce wolves into the national park."

About The Great Divide (2004), Booklist said, "Through profiles of Native Americans, gold rushers, feminists, hippies, and black sheep, Ferguson explores the region's roughand-tumble cultural history and tracks its transition from a land of trappers hunting wild prey to one of heli-skiers armed with cell phones." Publishers Weekly added, "From extreme sports adventurers and casual hikers to developers, the mountains are under increasing environmental duress, and Ferguson is an important voice on these issues." Selecting the book as an Editor's Choice, Audubon Magazine said, "The Great Divide is chock-full of tales about Indians, artists, politicians, missionaries, historians, explorers, and others who were inspired by the mountains to do great things."

In Natural History, Laurence A. Marschall's positive review said of Hawks Rest (2003), "Hawks Rest is not your usual idyll about the beauty of untrammeled wilderness. ...Surprisingly, though, for a book about the farthest and the wildest, Hawks Rest is mostly about people." The San Francisco Chronicle said, "Dazzling…an Edward Abbey–esque book, full of snappy vignettes and chiseled writing."

The Journal of Experiential Education said that Shouting at the Sky (1999)'s "portrayal of southern Utah's Aspen Achievement Academy has influenced public opinion about the use of wilderness programming to treat addiction, learning disabilities, delinquency, even eating disorders."

The New York Times lauded The Sylvan Path (1997), saying, "Ostensibly chasing the ghost of Joe Knowles, a self-proclaimed wild man who won fame in 1913 for claiming to have survived two months buck naked and provisionless in the Maine woods, Mr. Ferguson actually has a broader, equally romantic goal - to 'roam the last wild places . . . looking for the people who still had pieces of the old American imagination in their pockets.' The Sylvan Path is a book of leisurely evenings spent with loggers, fishermen, storytellers, herbalists and moonshiners - people who not only make their living in the woods but disconnect themselves as much as possible from mass production. A former forest ranger, Mr. Ferguson is a resourceful guide. Whether he's lying down to watch a sundew plant entrap an insect or paddling out into the middle of a lake to exchange yodeling calls with a pair of loons, he exudes a delighted, boyish enthusiasm. Without being preachy, his book makes an argument for slowing down and focusing more closely on wherever you happen to be."

School Library Journal characterized Spirits of the Wild (1996) as "A simple and diverse collection of stories that explain how things found in nature came to be."

== Works ==
=== Nonfiction ===
- The Eight Master Lessons of Nature: What Nature Teaches Us About Living Well In the World. Dutton, 2019. ISBN 978-1524743383
- The Carry Home. Counterpoint, 2014. ISBN 978-1619024489
- Opening Doors: Carole Noon and Her Dream to Save the Chimps. Save the Chimps, 2014. ISBN 978-097966853-1
- Decade of the Wolf: Returning The Wild To Yellowstone. With Douglas Smith. Lyons Press, Revised and Updated 2012. ISBN 978-0762779055
- The Great Divide: The Rocky Mountains in the American Mind. W. W. Norton & Company, 2004. ISBN 0393050726
- Hawks Rest: A Season in the Heart of Yellowstone. National Geographic Adventure Press, 2003. Torrey House Press, 2015. ISBN 978-1-937226-51-0
- Shouting at the Sky: Troubled Teens and the Promise of the Wild. Thomas Dunne Books, 1998. ISBN 978-0312200084
- Through the Woods: A Journey Through America's Forests. Originally published as The Sylvan Path: A Journey Through America's Forests. St. Martin's Press, 1997. Reprint Torrey House Press, 2015. ISBN 978-1-937226-50-3
- Spirits of the Wild: The World's Great Nature Myths. Clarkson Potter/Publishers, 1996. ISBN 9780517703694
- New England Walks. Fulcrum Publishing, 1995. ISBN 9781555912208
- Northwest Walks. Fulcrum Pub., 1995. ISBN 9781555911911
- Rocky Mountain Walks. Fulcrum Pub., 1993. ISBN 9781555911201
- Walking Down the Wild: A Journey Through The Yellowstone Rockies. Simon & Schuster, 1993. Globe Pequot, 1999. ISBN 9781560445753
- Rites of Passage : Celebrating Life's Changes. With Kathleen Wall. Originally published as Lights of Passage. Henry Holt, 1993. Beyond Words, 1998. ISBN 9781885223760
- Walks of the Pacific Northwest. Prentice Hall Press, 1991. ISBN 9780139450808
- Sawtooth Mountain Fun. Self-published, 1982. ISBN 9780962484605

== Awards ==
- 1997 Society of American Travel Writers Award for "The Sylvan Path"
- 2004 Nonfiction Book of the Year for "Hawks Rest" (National Geographic), by the Pacific Northwest and Mountains and Plains booksellers associations
- 2005 Montana Book of the Year for "Decade of the Wolf"
- 2007 William Kittredge Distinguished Visiting Writer, University of Montana
- 2008 Lifetime Achievement Award from the High Plains Book Festival
