= Nipigon Embayment =

Inactive continental rift zone in Northwestern Ontario, Canada

Coordinates: 50.07°N 88.64°W

The Nipigon Embayment is an inactive continental rift zone in Northwestern Ontario, Canada, centered on Lake Nipigon. It represents an aulacogen of the much larger Midcontinent Rift System, which formed some 1,100 million years ago when the North American craton began to split apart during the Proterozoic eon.
