= Lake Superior =

Largest of the Great Lakes of North America

- Ojibwe: ᑭᒋᑲᒥ / Gichigami, French: Lac Supérieur
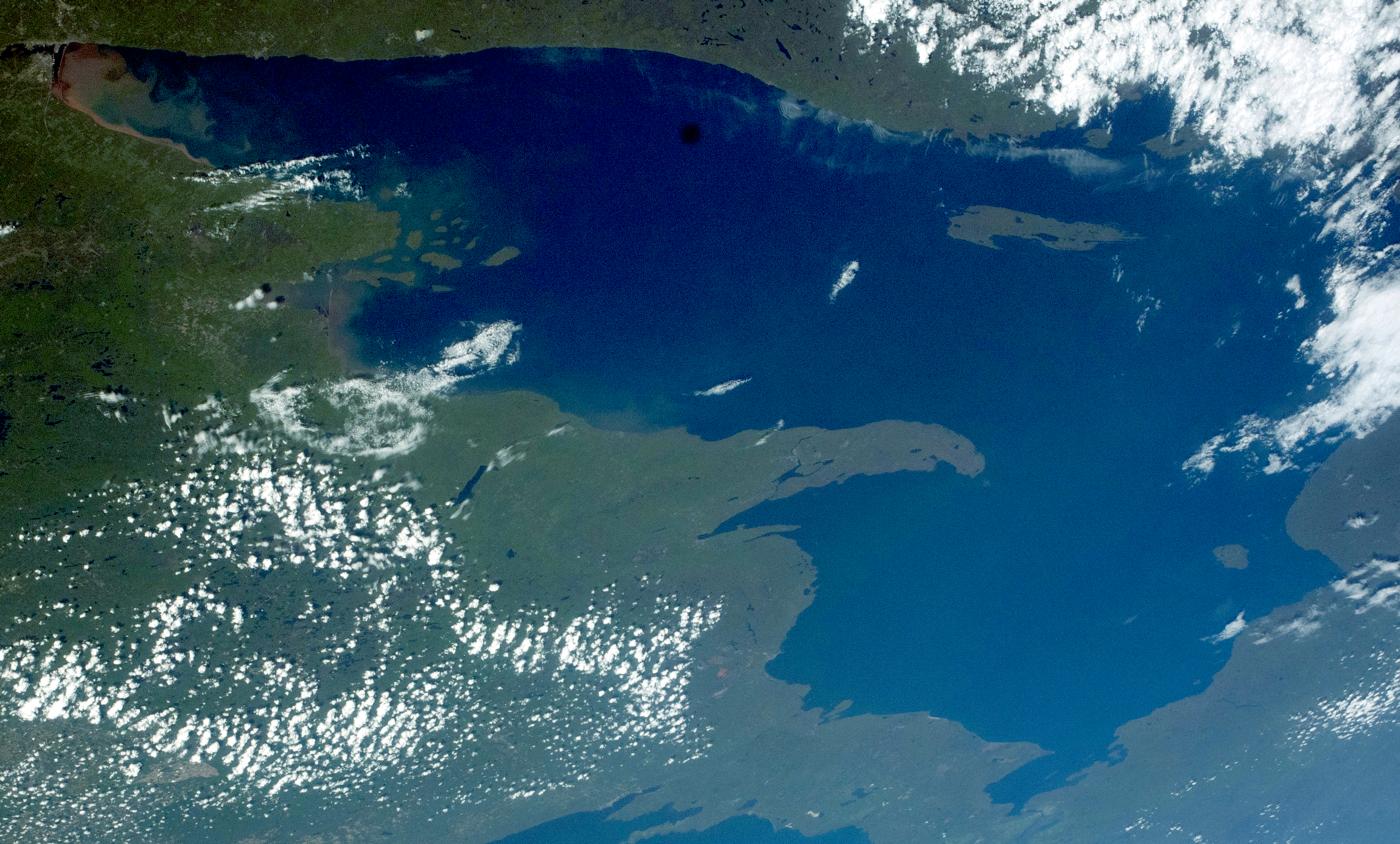
- Lake Superior seen from the International Space Station on June 6, 2019

- Location within North America

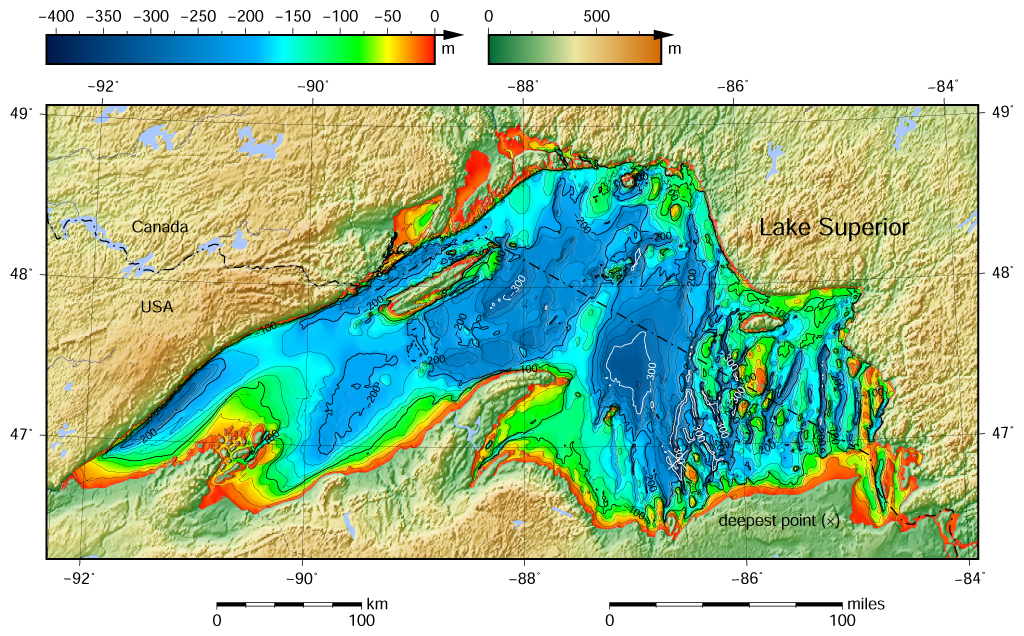
- Lake Superior bathymetric map. The deepest point, roughly off its southeastern shore, is marked with "×". The deep trenches in its eastern part may have originated from tunnel valleys.
- Location: North America
- Group: Great Lakes
- Coordinates: 47.7°N 87.5°W
- Lake type: Glacial
- Primary inflows: Nipigon, St. Louis, Pigeon, Pic, White, Michipicoten, Montreal, Agawa, Kaministiquia, Ontonagon, Tahquamenon Rivers
- Primary outflows: St. Marys River
- Catchment area: 49,300 sq mi (128,000 km^{2})
- Basin countries: Canada and the United States
- Max. length: 383 mi (616 km)
- Max. width: 160 mi (260 km)
- Surface area: 82,103 km^{2} (31,700 mi^{2})
- Average depth: 483 ft (147 m)
- Max. depth: 1,333 ft (406 m)
- Water volume: 12,070 km^{3} (2,900 mi^{3})
- Residence time: 191 years
- Shore length^{1}: 1,729 mi (2,783 km) plus 997 mi (1,605 km) for islands
- Surface elevation: 601.71 ft (183.40 m) (2013 average)
- Islands: Isle Royale, Apostle Islands, Michipicoten Island, Grand Island, Slate Islands
- Settlements: Thunder Bay, Ontario; Duluth, Minnesota; Sault Ste. Marie, Ontario; Marquette, Michigan; Superior, Wisconsin; Sault Ste. Marie, Michigan
- ^{1} Shore length is not a well-defined measure.

Lake Superior is a lake in central North America. The northernmost, westernmost, and highest of the Great Lakes, Lake Superior straddles the Canada–United States border with the Canadian province of Ontario to the north and east and the U.S. states of Minnesota to the west and Michigan and Wisconsin to the south. It is the largest freshwater lake in the world by surface area (Note: The Caspian Sea is the largest lake, but is saline, not freshwater. Lake Michigan–Huron has a larger combined surface area than Superior, but is normally considered two separate lakes.) and the third-largest freshwater lake by volume. It drains into Lake Huron via St. Marys River, then through the lower Great Lakes to the St. Lawrence River and ultimately the Atlantic Ocean.

== Name ==
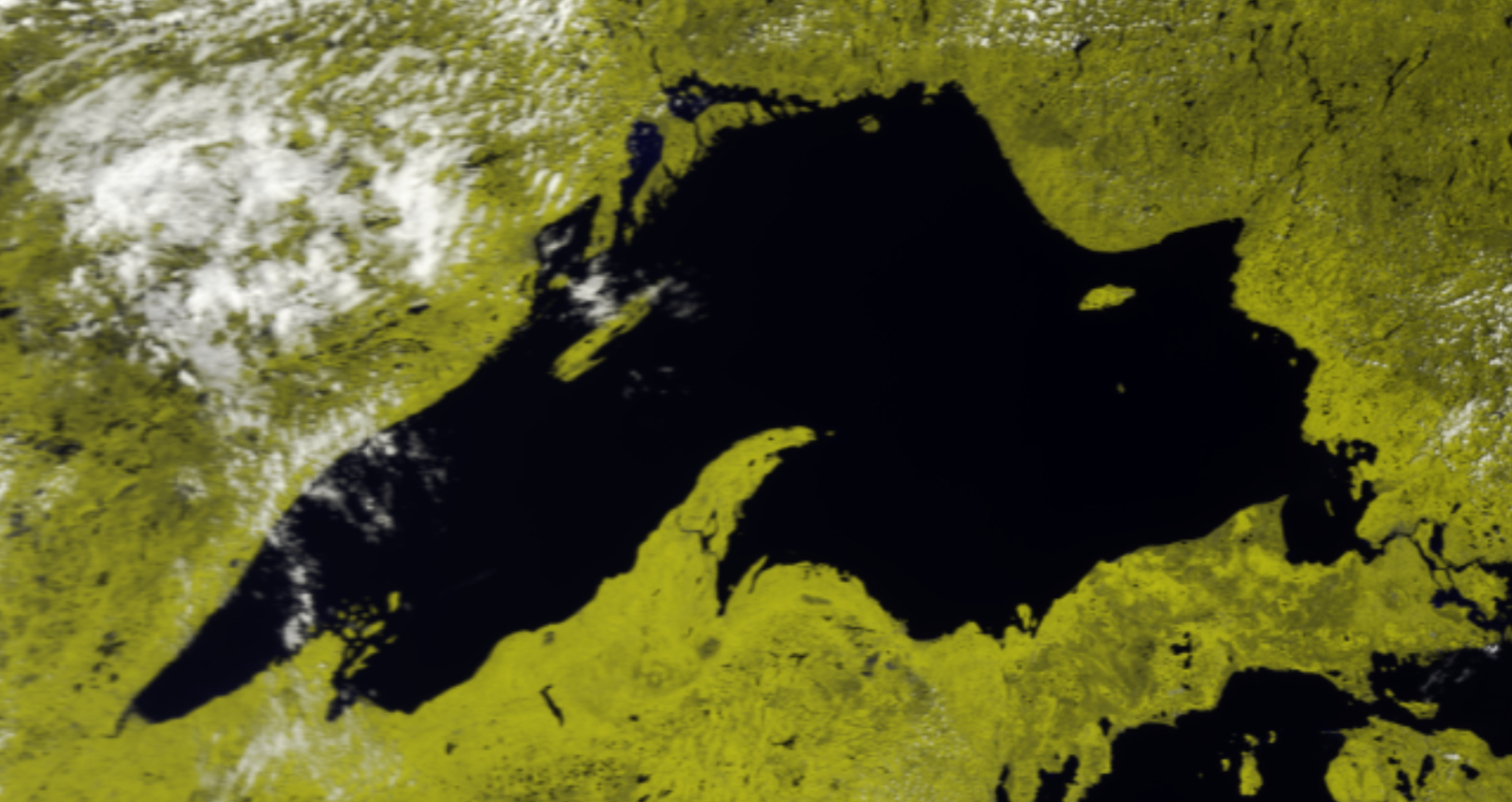
False color view of Lake Superior

Map of Great Lakes (Lake Superior in darker blue)

The Ojibwe name for the lake is gichi-gami (in syllabics: ᑭᒋᑲᒥ, pronounced gitchi-gami or kitchi-gami in different dialects), meaning "great sea". Henry Wadsworth Longfellow wrote this name as "Gitche Gumee" in the poem The Song of Hiawatha, as did Gordon Lightfoot in his song "The Wreck of the Edmund Fitzgerald".

According to other sources, the full Ojibwe name is ᐅᒋᑉᐧᐁ ᑭᒋᑲᒥ Ojibwe Gichigami ("Ojibwe's Great Sea") or ᐊᓂᐦᔑᓈᐯ ᑭᒋᑲᒥ Anishinaabe Gichigami ("Anishinaabe's Great Sea"). The 1853 dictionary by Father Frederic Baraga, the first one written for the Ojibway language, gives the Ojibwe name as Otchipwe-kitchi-gami (a transliteration of Ojibwe Gichigami).

In the 17th century, the first French explorers approached the great inland sea by way of the Ottawa River and Lake Huron; they referred to their discovery as le lac supérieur (the upper lake, i.e., above Lake Huron in elevation). Some 17th-century Jesuit missionaries referred to it as Lac Tracy (for Alexandre de Prouville de Tracy). After taking control of the region from the French in the 1760s, following their defeat in the French and Indian War, the British anglicized the lake's name to Superior, "on account of its being superior in magnitude to any of the lakes on that vast continent".

== Hydrography ==
Lake Superior empties into Lake Huron via the St. Marys River and the Soo Locks (Sault Ste. Marie locks). Lake Superior is the largest freshwater lake in the world by area and the third largest in volume, behind Lake Baikal in Siberia and Lake Tanganyika in East Africa. The Caspian Sea, while larger than Lake Superior in both surface area and volume, is brackish.

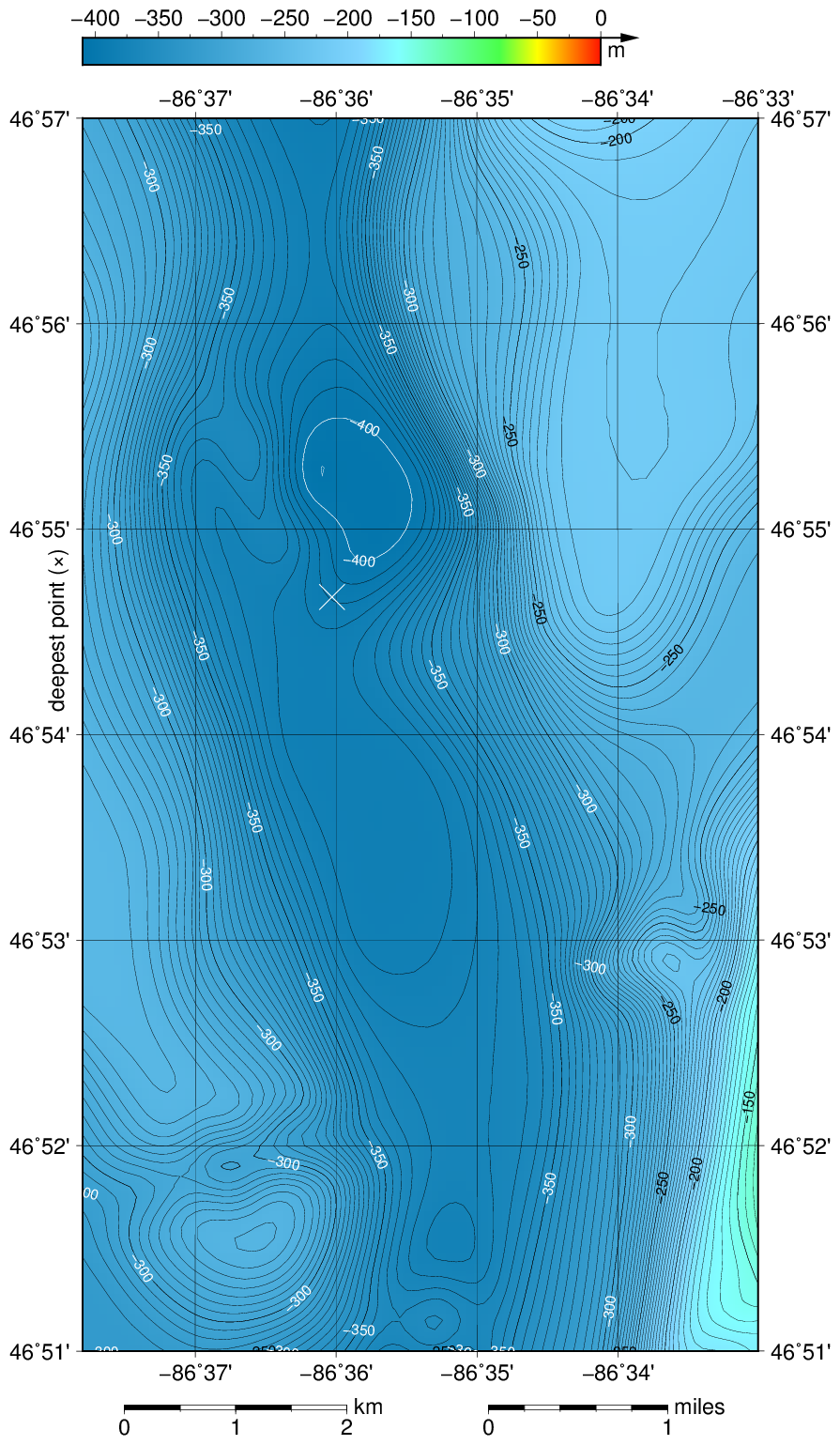
Lake Superior's deepest point on the bathymetric map

Lake Superior has a surface area of 31,700 square miles (82,000 km^{2}), which is approximately the size of South Carolina or Austria. It has a maximum length of 350 statute miles (563 km; 304 nmi) and maximum breadth of 160 statute miles (257 km; 139 nmi). Its average depth is 80.5 fathoms (483 ft; 147.2 m) with a maximum depth of 222.17 fathoms (1,333.0 ft; 406.30 m). Lake Superior contains 2,900 cubic miles (12,100 km^{3}) of water. There is enough water in Lake Superior to cover the entire land mass of North and South America to a depth of 30 centimetres (12 in). (Note: North America (2.47×10^{7} km^{2}) and South America (1.78×10^{7} km^{2}) combined cover 4.26×10^{7} km^{2}. Lake Superior's volume (1.20×10^{4} km^{3}) over 4.26×10^{7} km^{2} gives a depth of 0.282 m.) The shoreline of the lake stretches 2,726 miles (4,387 km) (including islands). The lake boasts a very small ratio (1.55) of catchment area to surface area, which indicates minimal terrestrial influence.

American limnologist J. Val Klump was the first person to reach the lowest depth of Lake Superior on July 30, 1985, as part of a scientific expedition, which at 122 fathoms 1 foot (733 ft or 223 m) below sea level is the second-lowest spot in the continental interior of the United States and the third-lowest spot in the interior of the North American continent after Great Slave Lake in the Northwest Territories of Canada (1,503 ft or 458 m below sea level) and Iliamna Lake in Alaska 942 ft or 287 m. (Though Crater Lake is the deepest lake in the United States and deeper than Lake Superior, Crater Lake's elevation is higher and consequently its deepest point is 4,229 feet (1,289 m) above sea level.)

While the temperature of the surface of Lake Superior varies seasonally, the temperature below 110 fathoms (660 ft; 200 m) is an almost constant 39 °F (4 °C). This variation in temperature makes the lake seasonally stratified. Twice per year, however, the water column reaches a uniform temperature of 39 °F (4 °C) from top to bottom, and the lake waters thoroughly mix. This feature makes the lake dimictic. Because of its volume, Lake Superior has a retention time of 191 years.

Annual storms on Lake Superior regularly feature wave heights of over 20 feet (6.1 m). Waves well over 30 feet (9 m) have been recorded.

=== Tributaries ===
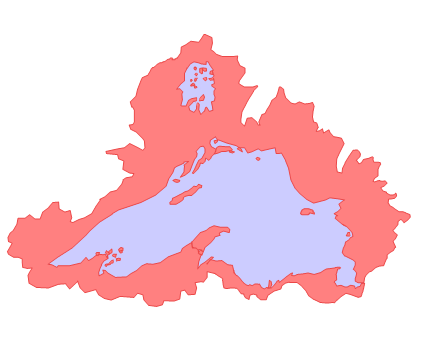
Lake Superior basin

Lake Superior is fed by more than 200 rivers, including the Nipigon River, the St. Louis River, the Pigeon River, the Pic River, the White River, the Michipicoten River, the Bois Brule River and the Kaministiquia River. The lake's outlet at St. Marys River has a relatively steep gradient with rapids. The Soo Locks enable ships to bypass the rapids and to overcome the 25-foot (8 m) height difference between Lakes Superior and Huron.

=== Water levels ===
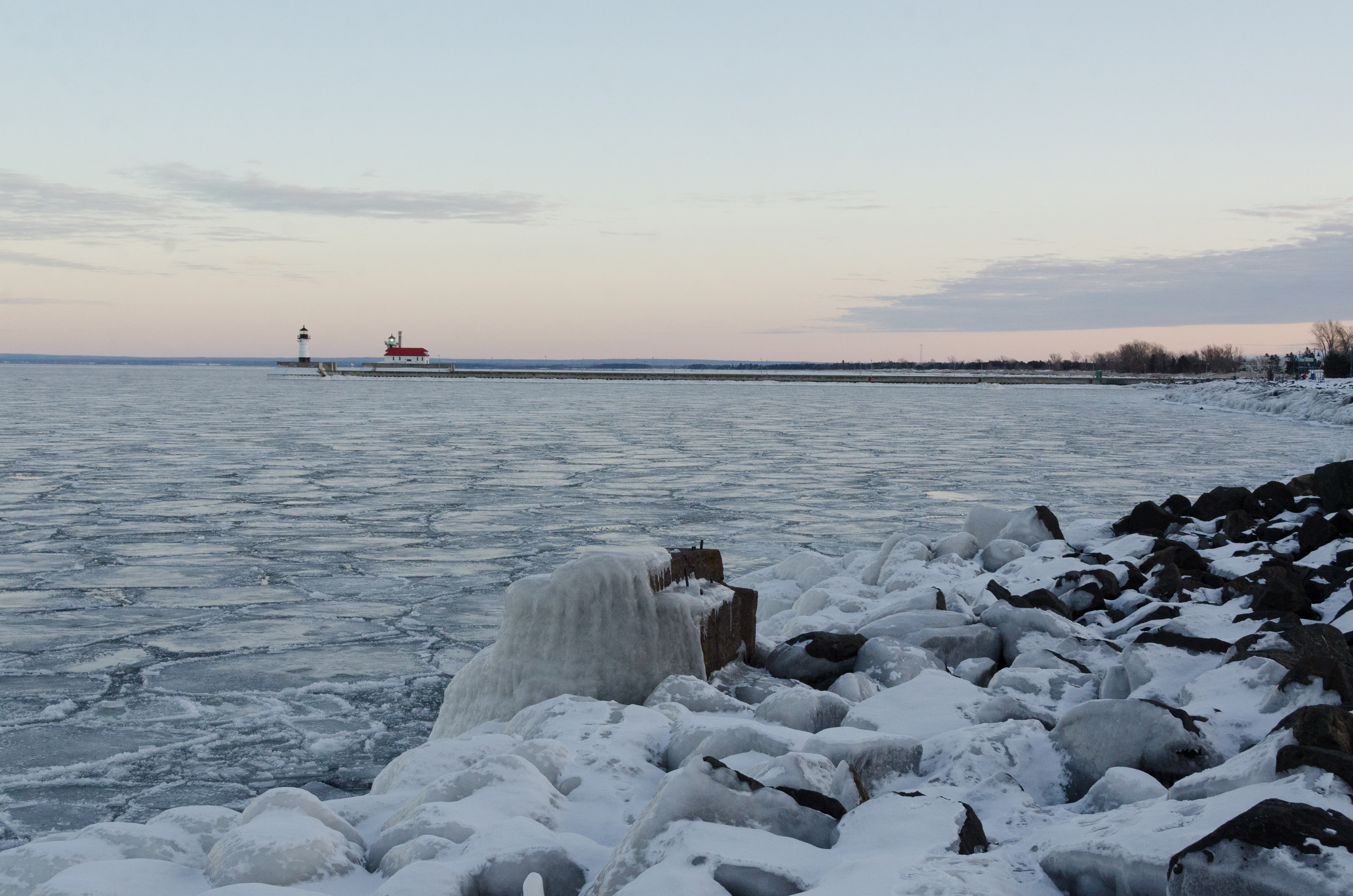
A frozen Duluth Harbor entrance

The lake's average surface elevation is 600 feet (183 m) above sea level. Until approximately 1887, the natural hydraulic conveyance through the St. Marys River rapids determined the outflow from Lake Superior. By 1921, development in support of transportation and hydroelectric power resulted in gates, locks, power canals and other control structures completely spanning St. Marys rapids. The regulating structure is known as the Compensating Works and is operated according to a regulation plan known as Plan 1977-A. Water levels, including diversions of water from the Hudson Bay watershed, are regulated by the International Lake Superior Board of Control, which was established in 1914 by the International Joint Commission.

Lake Superior's water level was at a new record low in September 2007, slightly less than the previous record low in 1926. Water levels recovered within a few days.

The lake's water level fluctuates from month to month, with the highest lake levels in October and November. The normal high-water mark is 1.17 feet (0.36 m) above the datum (601.1 ft or 183.2 m). In the summer of 1985, Lake Superior reached its highest recorded level at 2.33 feet (0.71 m) above the datum. 2019 and 2020 set new high-water records in nearly every month.

The lake's lowest levels occur in March and April. The normal low-water mark is 0.33 feet (0.10 m) below the datum. In the winter of 1926, Lake Superior reached its lowest recorded level at 1.58 feet (0.48 m) below the datum. Additionally, the entire first half of the year (January to June) included record low months. The low water was a continuation of the dropping lake levels from the previous year, 1925, which set low-water records for October through December. During the nine-month period of October 1925 to June 1926, water levels ranged from 1.58 to 0.33 feet (0.48 to 0.10 m) below Chart Datum. In the summer of 2007 monthly historic lows were set; August at 0.66 feet (0.20 m), and September at 0.58 feet (0.18 m).

=== Climate change ===
According to a study by professors at the University of Minnesota Duluth, Lake Superior may have warmed faster than its surrounding area. Summer surface temperatures in the lake appeared to have increased by about 4.5 °F (2.5 °C) between 1979 and 2007, compared with an approximately 2.7 °F (1.5 °C) increase in the surrounding average air temperature. The increase in the lake's surface temperature may be related to the decreasing ice cover. Less winter ice cover allows more solar radiation to penetrate and warm the water. If trends continue, Lake Superior, which freezes over completely once every 20 years, could routinely be ice-free by 2040 although more current data through 2021 does not support this trend.

Warmer temperatures could lead to more snow in the lake effect snow belts along the shores of the lake, especially in the Upper Peninsula of Michigan. Two recent consecutive winters (2013–2014 and 2014–2015) brought high ice coverage to the Great Lakes, and on March 6, 2014, overall ice coverage peaked at 92.5%, the second-highest in recorded history. Lake Superior's ice coverage further beat 2014's record in 2019, reaching 95% coverage.

== Geography ==
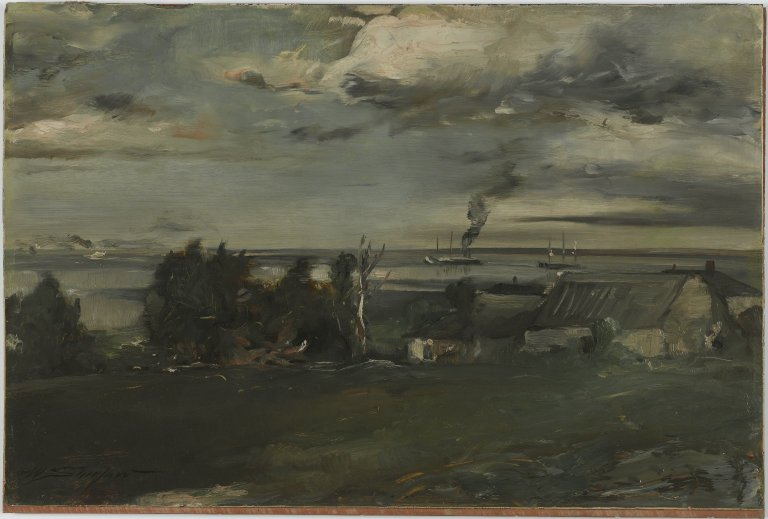
Lake Superior, by Walter Shirlaw

The largest island in Lake Superior is Isle Royale in Michigan. Isle Royale contains several lakes, some of which also contain islands. Other well-known islands include Madeline Island in Wisconsin, Michipicoten Island in Ontario, and Grand Island (the location of the Grand Island National Recreation Area) in Michigan.

The larger cities on Lake Superior include the twin ports of Duluth, Minnesota, and Superior, Wisconsin; Thunder Bay, Ontario; Marquette, Michigan; and the twin cities of Sault Ste. Marie, Michigan, and Sault Ste. Marie, Ontario. Duluth-Superior, at the western end of Lake Superior, is the most inland point on the Saint Lawrence Seaway and the most inland port in the world.

Among the scenic places on the lake are Apostle Islands National Lakeshore, Brockway Mountain Drive on the Keweenaw Peninsula, Isle Royale National Park, Porcupine Mountains Wilderness State Park, Pukaskwa National Park, Lake Superior Provincial Park, Grand Island National Recreation Area, Sleeping Giant (Ontario) and Pictured Rocks National Lakeshore. The Great Lakes Circle Tour is a designated scenic road system connecting all of the Great Lakes and the St. Lawrence River.

== Climate ==
Lake Superior's size reduces the severity of the seasons of its humid continental climate (more typically seen in locations like Nova Scotia). The water surface's slow reaction to temperature changes, seasonally ranging between 32 and 55 °F (0 and 13 °C) around 1970, helps to moderate surrounding air temperatures in the summer (cooler with frequent sea breeze formations) and winter, and creates lake-effect snow in colder months. The hills and mountains that border the lake hold moisture and fog, particularly in the fall.

== Geology ==
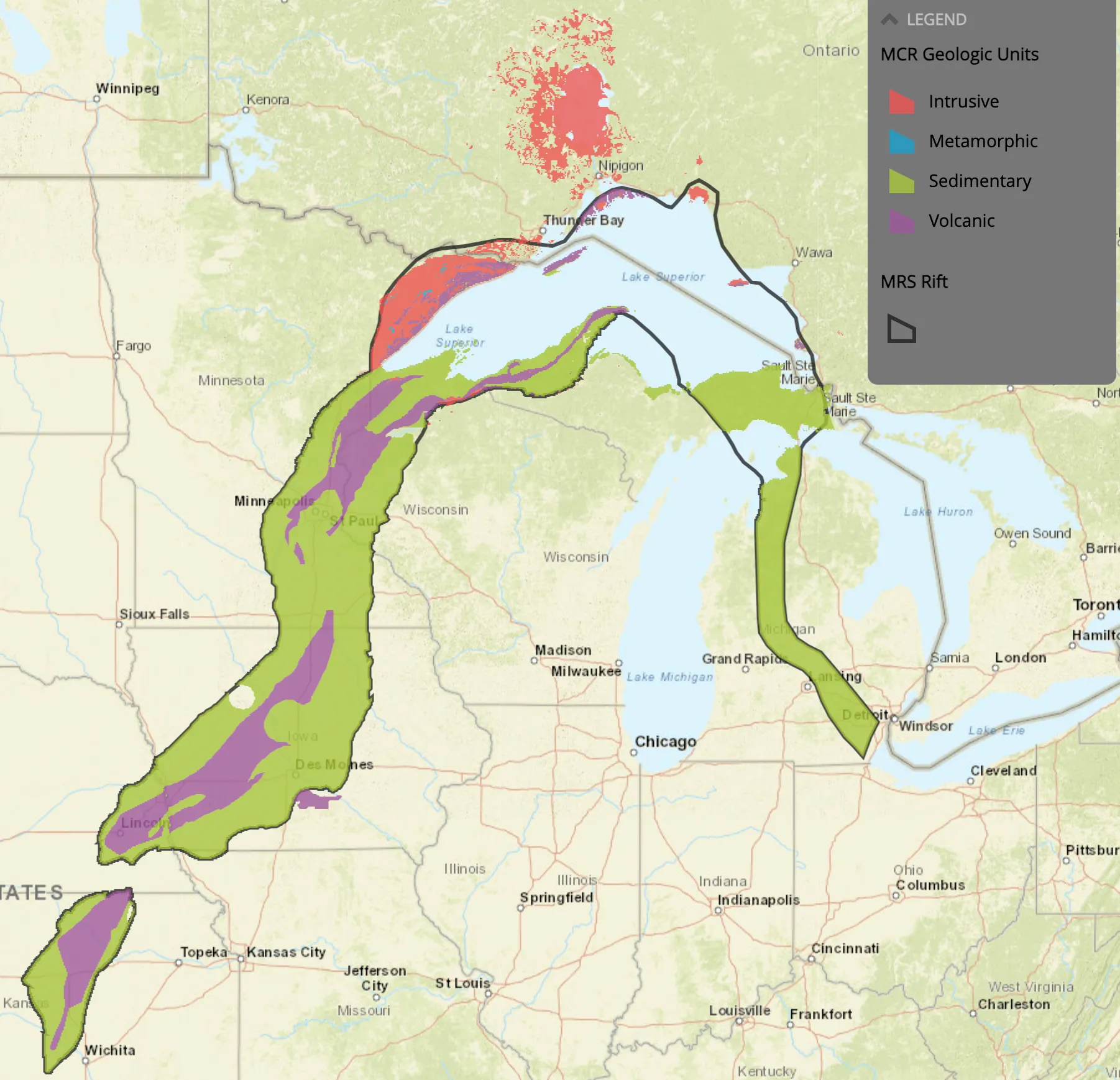
Most of Lake Superior lies within the basin of the Midcontinent Rift.

The rocks of Lake Superior's northern shore date back to the early history of the earth. During the Precambrian (between 4.5 billion and 540 million years ago) magma forcing its way to the surface created the intrusive granites of the Canadian Shield. These ancient granites can be seen on the North Shore today. It was during the Penokean orogeny, part of the process that created the Great Lakes tectonic zone, that many valuable metals were deposited. The region surrounding the lake has proved to be rich in minerals, with copper, iron, silver, gold and nickel the most frequently mined. Notable production includes gold from the Hemlo mine near Marathon, copper from the Keweenaw Peninsula and the Mamainse Point Formation, iron from the Gogebic Range, silver at Silver Islet, and uranium at Theano Point.

The mountains steadily eroded, depositing layers of sediments that compacted and became limestone, dolomite, taconite and the shale at Kakabeka Falls. The continental crust was later riven, creating one of the deepest rifts in the world. The lake lies in this long-extinct Mesoproterozoic rift valley, the Midcontinent Rift. Magma was injected between layers of sedimentary rock, forming diabase sills. This hard diabase protects the layers of sedimentary rock below, forming the flat-topped mesas in the Thunder Bay area. Amethyst formed in some of the cavities created by the Midcontinent Rift, and there are several amethyst mines in the Thunder Bay area.

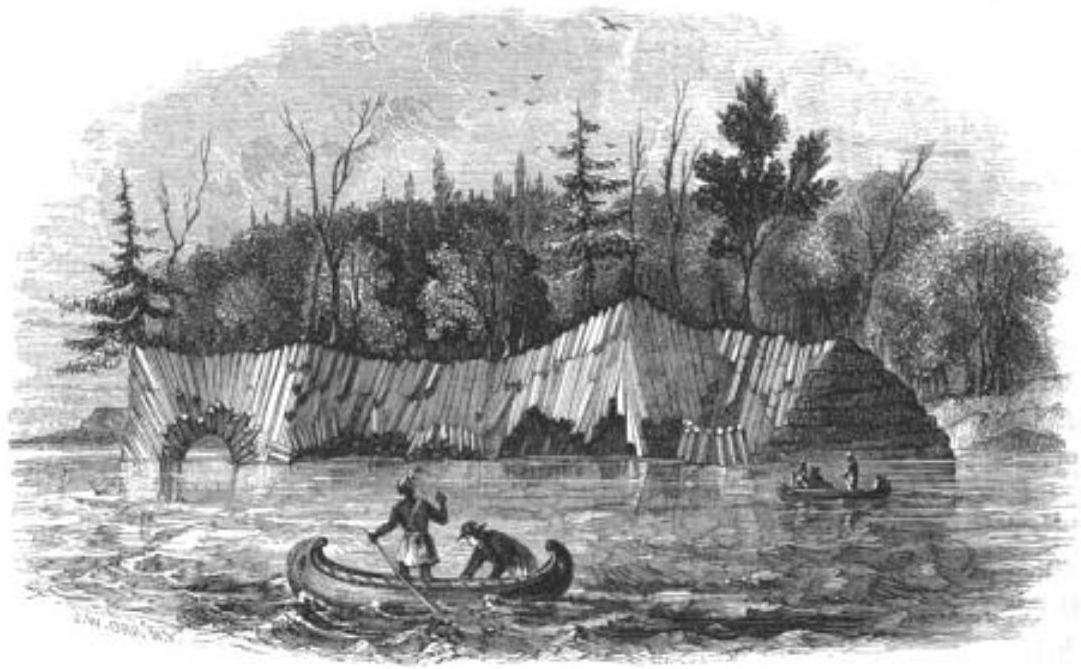
Basaltic columns along Lake Superior

Lava erupted from the rift and formed the black basalt rock of Michipicoten Island, Black Bay Peninsula, St. Ignace Island, and Isle Royale.

In the most recent geological history, during the Wisconsin glaciation 10,000 years ago, ice covered the region at a thickness of 1.25 miles (2.01 km). The land contours familiar today were carved by the advance and retreat of the ice sheet. The retreat left gravel, sand, clay and boulder deposits. Glacial meltwaters gathered in the Superior basin creating Lake Minong, a precursor to Lake Superior. Without the immense weight of the ice, the land rebounded, and a drainage outlet formed at Sault Ste. Marie, becoming today's St. Mary's River.

== History ==
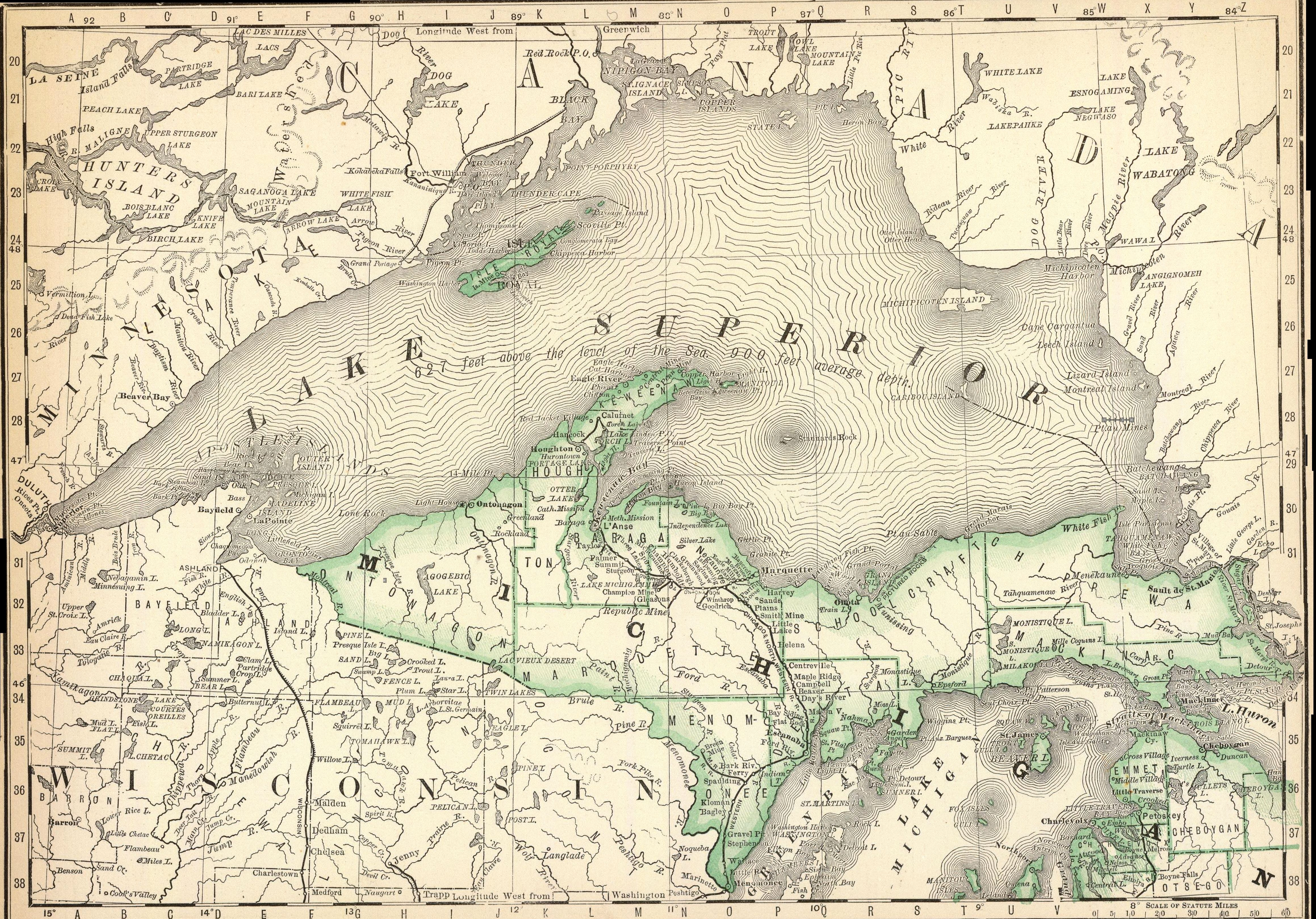
Historical map of Lake Superior and Northern Michigan, published 1879 by Rand McNally

The first people came to the Lake Superior region 10,000 years ago after the retreat of the glaciers in the Last Glacial Period. They are known as the Plano, and they used stone-tipped spears to hunt caribou on the northwestern side of Lake Minong. The Shield Archaic peoples arrived around 5000 BC; evidence of this culture can be found at the eastern and western ends of the Canadian shore. They used bows and arrows, paddled dugout canoes, fished, hunted, mined copper for tools and weapons, and established trading networks. They are believed to be the direct ancestors of the Ojibwe and Cree. The people of the Laurel complex (c. 500 BC to AD 500) developed seine net fishing, evidence being found at rivers around Superior such as the Pic and Michipicoten. The people of the Terminal Woodland period were evident in the area from AD 900 to 1650. They were Algonquian peoples who hunted, fished and gathered berries. They used snowshoes, birch bark canoes and conical or domed lodges. At the mouth of the Michipicoten River, nine layers of encampments have been discovered. Most of the Pukaskwa Pits were likely made during this time.

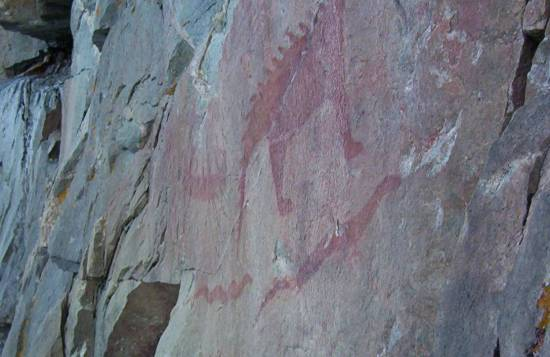
Pictographs at Lake Superior Provincial Park, Ontario

The Anishinaabe people (an ethnic grouping including the Ojibwe/Chippewa) have inhabited the Lake Superior region for over five hundred years and were preceded by the Dakota, Meskwaki (Fox), Menominee, Nipigon, Noquet and Gros Ventres. After the arrival of Europeans, the Anishinaabe made themselves middle-men between the French fur traders and other Native peoples. They soon became the dominant Native American nation in the region: they forced out the Sioux and Meskwaki and won a victory against the Haudenosaunee west of Sault Ste. Marie in 1662. By the mid-18th century, the Ojibwe occupied all of Lake Superior's shores.

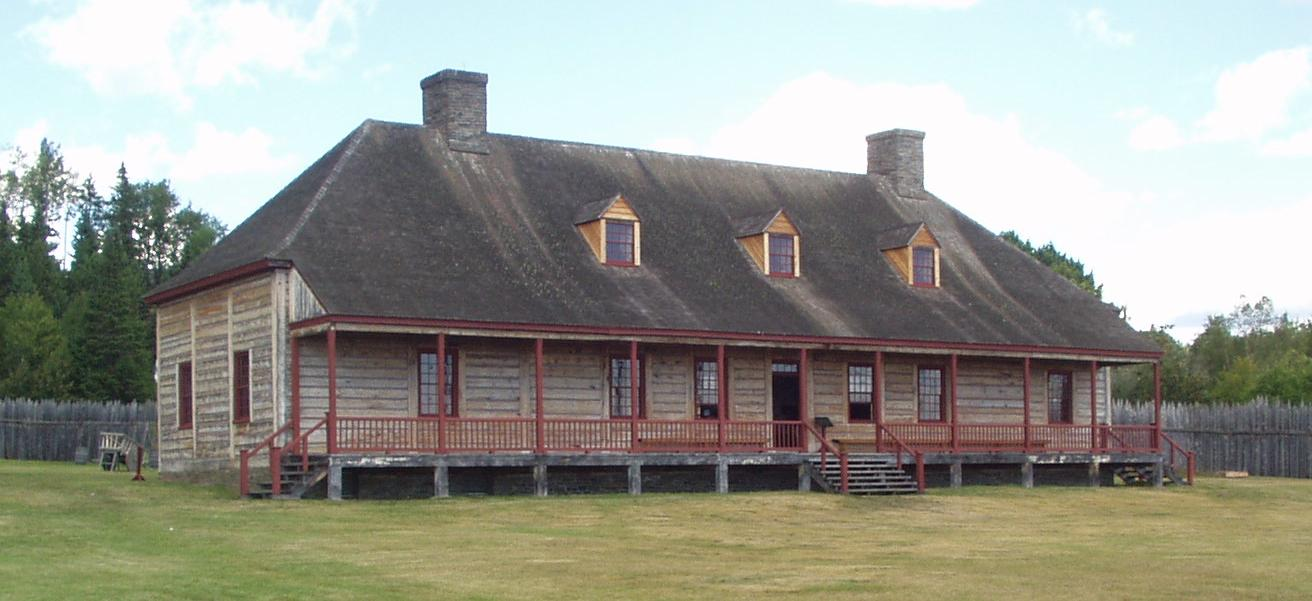
Reconstructed Great Hall, Grand Portage National Monument, Minnesota

In the 18th century, as the booming fur trade supplied Europe with beaver hats, the Hudson's Bay Company had a virtual monopoly in the region until 1783, when the rival North West Company was formed. The North West Company built forts on Lake Superior at Grand Portage, Fort William, Nipigon, the Pic River, the Michipicoten River, and Sault Ste. Marie. But by 1821, with competition harming the profits of both, the companies merged under the Hudson's Bay Company name. Many towns around the lake are current or former mining areas, or engaged in processing or shipping. Today, tourism is another significant industry: the sparsely populated Lake Superior country, with its rugged shorelines and wilderness, attracts vacationers and adventurers.

=== Shipping ===
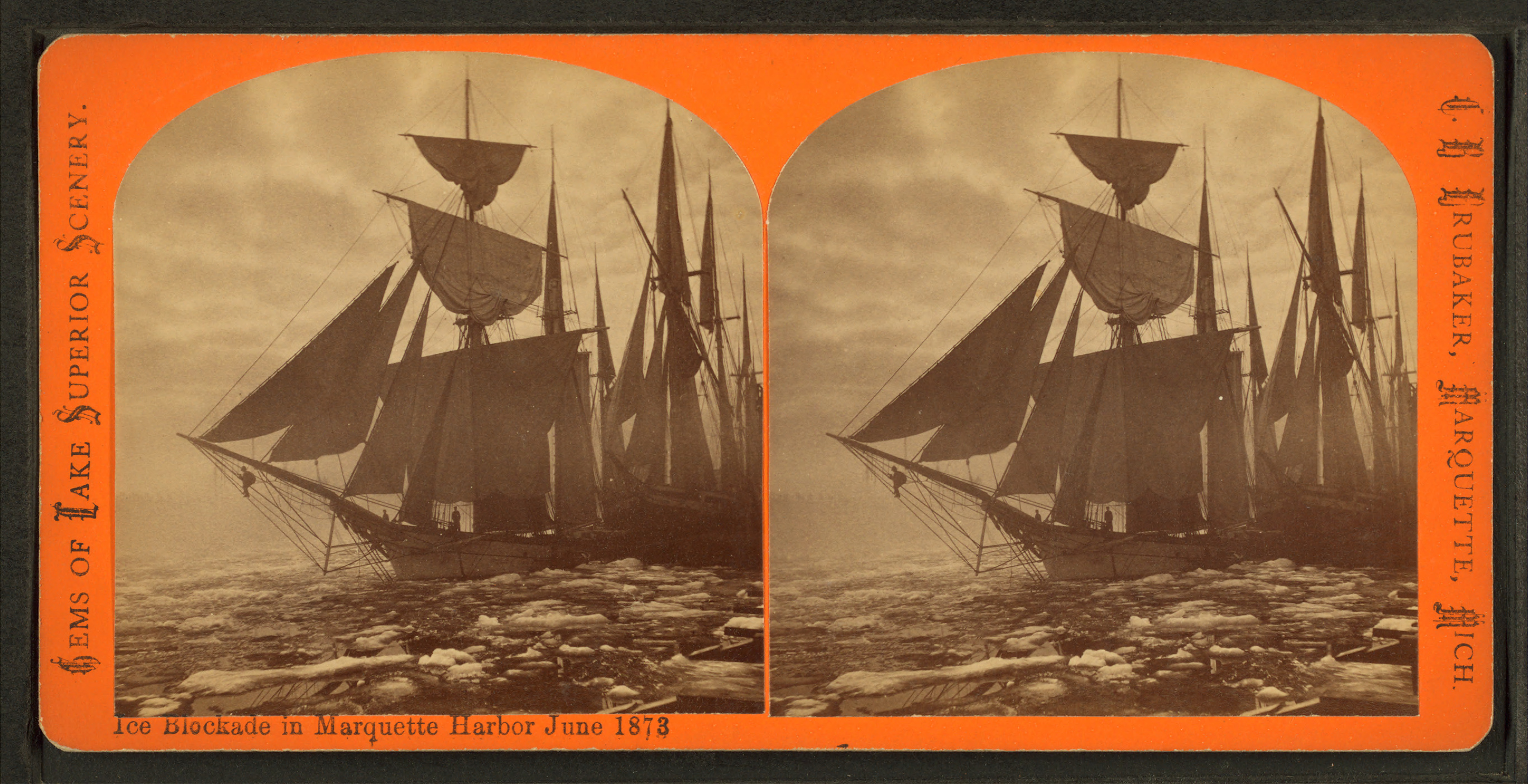
"Ice blockade in Marquette Harbor, June 1873", stereoscopic photo

Lake Superior has been an important link in the Great Lakes Waterway, providing a route for the transportation of iron ore as well as grain and other mined and manufactured materials. Large cargo vessels called lake freighters, as well as smaller ocean-going freighters, transport these commodities across Lake Superior. Shipping was slow to arrive at Lake Superior in the 19th century. The first steamboat to run on the lake was the Independence in 1847, whereas the first steamers on the other Great Lakes began sailing in 1816. Ice closes the lake shipping from mid-January to late March. Exact dates for the shipping season vary each year, depending on weather conditions that form and break the ice.

=== Shipwrecks ===
The southern shore of Lake Superior between Grand Marais, Michigan, and Whitefish Point is known as the "Graveyard of the Great Lakes"; more ships have been lost around the Whitefish Point area than any other part of Lake Superior. These shipwrecks are now protected by the Whitefish Point Underwater Preserve. Storms that claimed multiple ships include the Mataafa Storm in November 1905 and the Great Lakes Storm of 1913.

Wreckage of SS Cyprus—a 420-foot (130 m) ore carrier that sank on October 11, 1907, during a Lake Superior storm in 77 fathoms (460 ft; 140 m) of water—was located in August 2007. Built in Lorain, Ohio, Cyprus was launched August 17, 1907, and was lost on her second voyage hauling iron ore from Superior, Wisconsin, to Buffalo, New York, with the sole survivor among her 23 crew being Charles G. Pitz. In 1918 the last warships to sink in the Great Lakes, French minesweepers Inkerman and Cerisoles, vanished in a Lake Superior storm, perhaps upon striking the uncharted danger of the Superior Shoal in an otherwise deep part of the lake. With 78 crewmembers dead, their sinking marked the largest loss of life on Lake Superior to date.

SS Edmund Fitzgerald is the last ship that sank in Lake Superior, 15 nautical miles (28 km; 17 mi) from Whitefish Point in a storm on November 10, 1975. The wreck was immortalized by Gordon Lightfoot in his ballad "The Wreck of the Edmund Fitzgerald". All 29 crew members died, and no bodies were recovered. Edmund Fitzgerald was battered so intensely by Lake Superior that the 729-foot (222 m) ship split in half; her two pieces lie approximately 170 feet (52 m) apart at a depth of 88 fathoms (530 ft; 160 m).

Lightfoot sings that "Superior, they said, never gives up her dead". This is because of the unusually cold water, under 36 °F (2 °C) on average around 1970. Normally, bacteria decaying a sunken body will bloat it with gas, causing it to float to the surface after a few days. But Lake Superior's water is cold enough year-round to inhibit bacterial growth, and bodies tend to sink and never resurface. Joe MacInnis reported that in July 1994, explorer Frederick Shannon's Expedition 94 to the wreck of Edmund Fitzgerald discovered a man's body near the port side of her pilothouse, not far from the open door, "fully clothed, wearing an orange life jacket, and lying face down in the sediment".

In February 2024, it was announced that wreckage from the SS Arlington, which sank in 1940, was discovered.

== Ecology ==
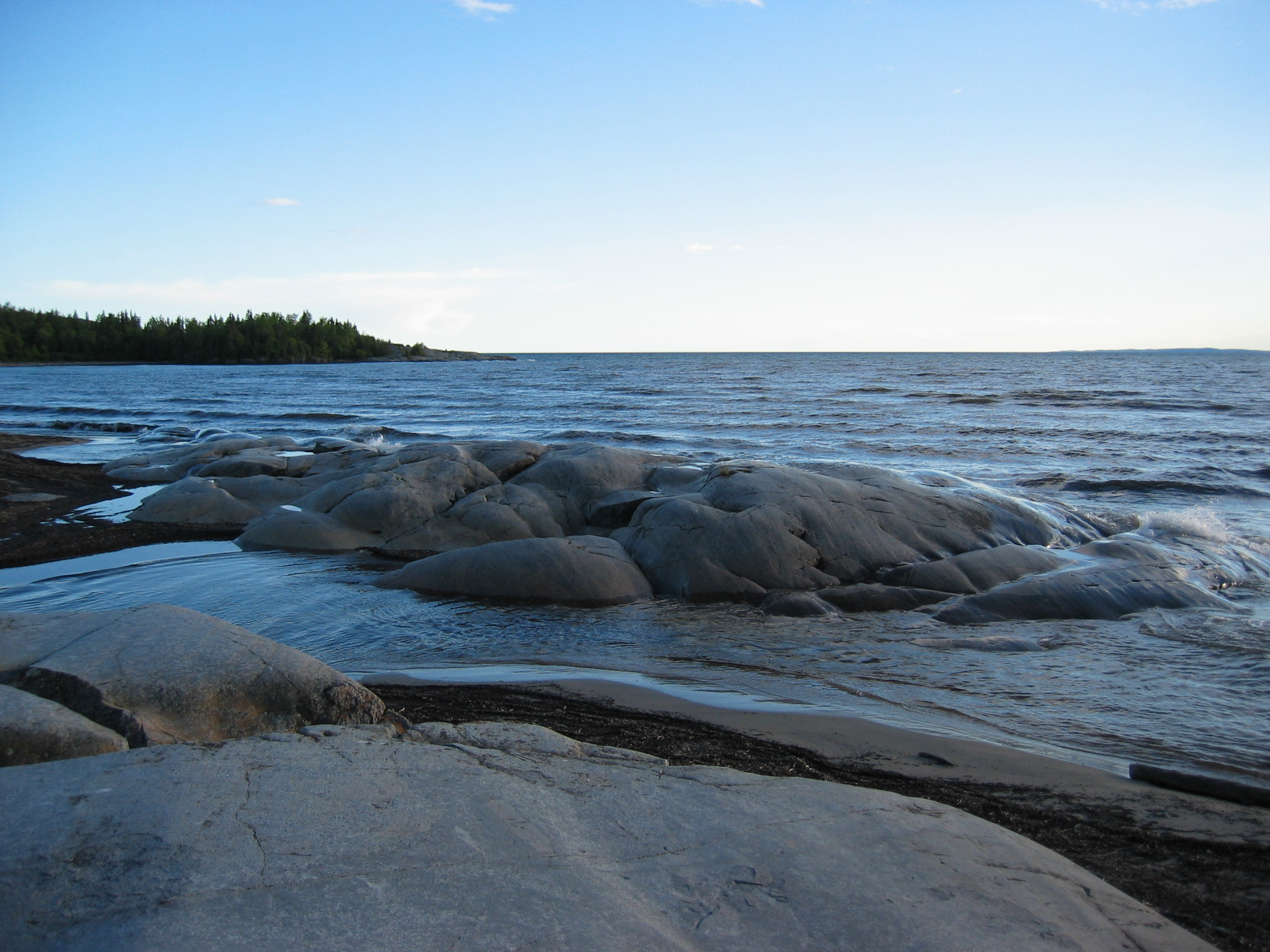
Bedrock shoreline, Neys Provincial Park, Ontario

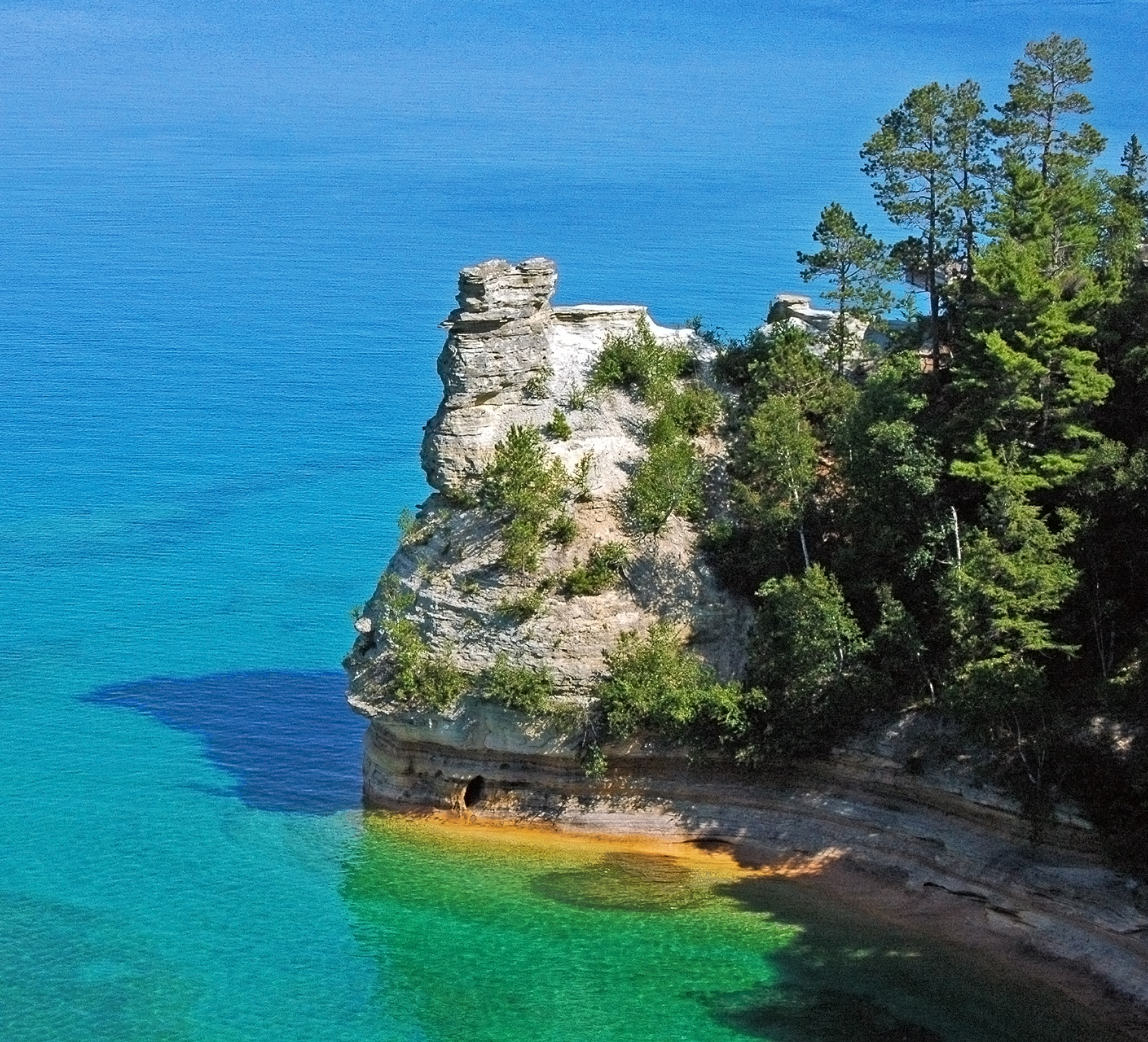
Pictured Rocks National Lakeshore, Michigan

More than 80 species of fish have been found in Lake Superior. Species native to the lake include banded killifish, bloater, brook trout, burbot, cisco, lake sturgeon, lake trout, lake whitefish, longnose sucker, muskellunge, northern pike, pumpkinseed, rock bass, round whitefish, smallmouth bass, walleye, white sucker and yellow perch. In addition, many fish species have been either intentionally or accidentally introduced to Lake Superior: Atlantic salmon, brown trout, carp, chinook salmon, coho salmon, freshwater drum, pink salmon, rainbow smelt, rainbow trout, round goby, ruffe, sea lamprey and white perch.

Lake Superior has fewer dissolved nutrients relative to its water volume than the other Great Lakes and so is less productive in terms of fish populations and is an oligotrophic lake. This is a result of the underdeveloped soils found in its relatively small watershed. It is also a reflection of relatively small human population and small amount of agriculture in its watershed. However, nitrate concentrations in the lake have been continuously rising for more than a century. They are still much lower than levels considered dangerous to human health; but this steady, long-term rise is an unusual record of environmental nitrogen buildup. It may relate to anthropogenic alternations to the regional nitrogen cycle, but researchers are still unsure of the causes of this change to the lake's ecology.

As for other Great Lakes fish, populations have also been affected by the accidental or intentional introduction of foreign species such as the sea lamprey and Eurasian ruffe. Accidental introductions have occurred in part by the removal of natural barriers to navigation between the Great Lakes. Overfishing has also been a factor in the decline of fish populations.

== Conservation ==
=== Lakehead Region Conservation Authority ===
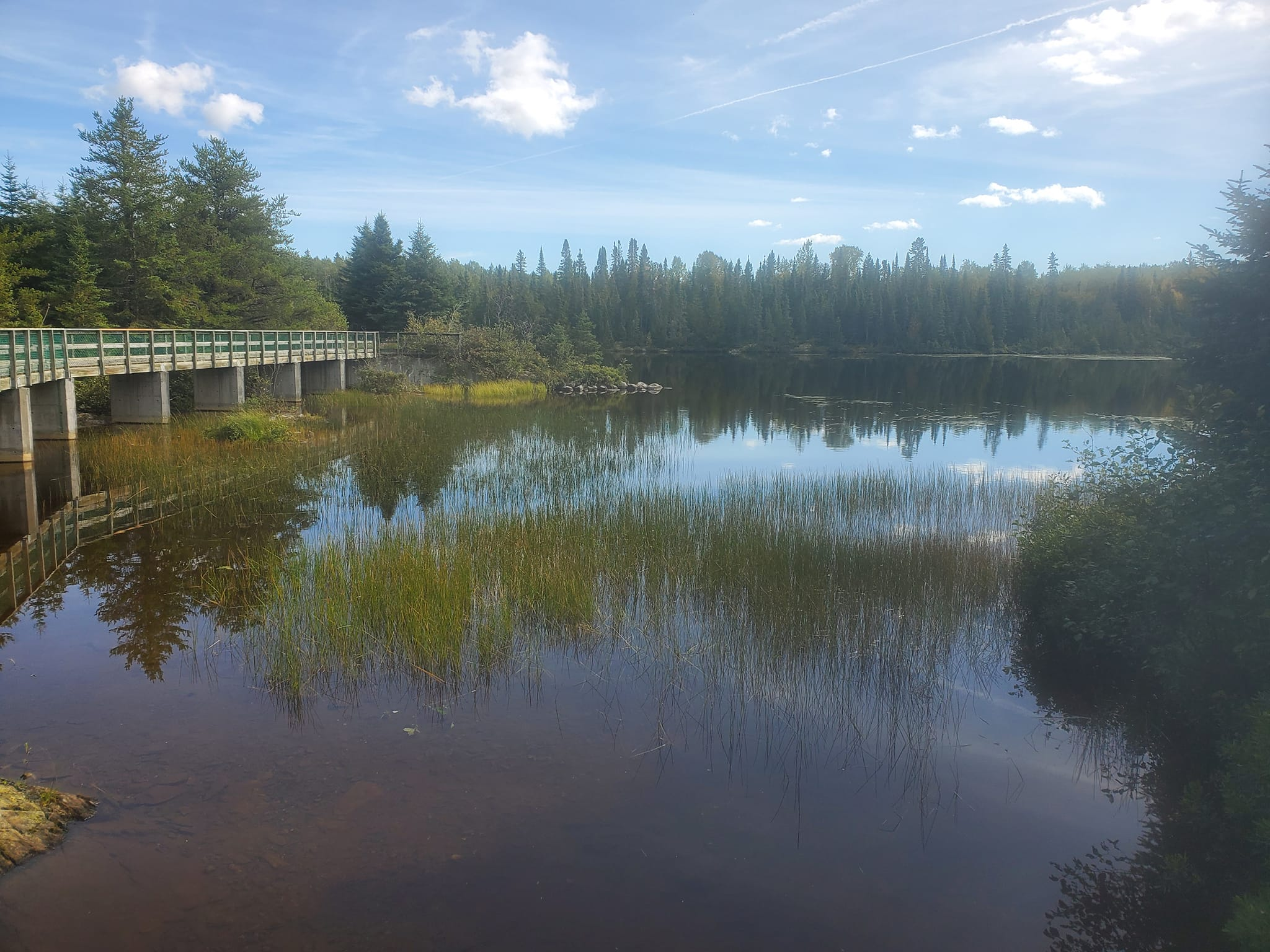
Photograph taken at Hazelwood Lake Conservation Area near Thunder Bay, September 2022.

The Lakehead Region Conservation Authority (LRCA) is a conservation authority in northern Ontario. The LRCA monitors Lake Superior water levels, and manages conservation areas. It was established in 1954, under the name Neebing Valley Conservation Authority, and became Lakehead Region Conservation Authority in 1963.

In 2025, the government of Ontario released a plan to consolidate conservation authorities across the province; under this plan, LRCA would have been combined with conservation authorities in southern Ontario on the shore of Lake Huron. Due to objections to this proposal, the plan was partly walked back. A name change is planned to "Northwestern Regional Conservation Authority."

== See also ==
- List of lakes in Ontario
