= Hada =

Hada may refer to:

- Hada, or Khata, traditional ceremonial scarf used in Tibet and Mongolia
- Hada, a Jurchen-Manchu tribal nation annexed by Nurhaci in 1601
- Hada (surname), a Japanese and Romanian surname
- Hada (activist), Mongol activist advocating for the separation of Inner Mongolia from the People's Republic of China
- Hada (clan), clan of Rajputs, a branch of the Chauhan clan of suryavanshi rajputs
- Hada (moth), a moth genus
- Hyderabad Airport Development Authority
- Hada, a village of the Kwakwaka'wakw that had been at what is now Ahta Indian Reserve No. 3 on the Coast of British Columbia, Canada

== See also ==
- Hadda (disambiguation)
- Haida (disambiguation)
