= Porphyry =

Porphyry or porphyrios may refer to:

== Geology ==
- Porphyry (geology), an igneous rock with large crystals in a fine-grained matrix, often purple, and prestigious Roman sculpture material
- Shoksha porphyry, quartzite of purple color resembling true porphyry mined near the village of Shoksha, Karelia, Russia
- Porphyritic, the general igneous texture of a rock with two distinct crystal (phenocryst) sizes
- Porphyry copper deposit, a primary (low grade) ore deposit of copper, consisting of porphyry rocks

== Places ==
- Mons Porphyrites, the only porphyry quarry worked in the ancient world for the emperor's building works and statuary
- Porphyry Island, in Lake Superior, Canada
- Porphyry Mountain in Alaska, United States
- Porphyry, a system of astrological house division
- Porphyry, a vineyard near Seaham, New South Wales, Australia

== Animals and plants ==
- Porphyra, a foliose red algal genus of laver
- Oliva porphyria, a species of sea snail
- Porphyrio, the swamphens, a genus of birds in the rail family
- Porphyrios (whale), a 6th-century whale

== People and characters ==
- Porphyrion, a giant in Greek mythology
- Pomponius Porphyrion (fl. 2nd or 3rd century), Latin grammarian
- Porphyry (philosopher) (234–305), Neoplatonic philosopher
- Porphyrios of Philippi (fl. early 4th century), bishop of the Metropolis of Philippi, Neapolis and Thasos
- Publilius Optatianus Porfyrius (fl. 4th century), Latin poet
- Porphyry of Gaza, or Saint Porphyrius (347–420), Bishop of Gaza
- Porphyrius the Charioteer (fl. 5th/6th centuries), Roman charioteer
- Porphyrios Dikaios (1904–1971), Greek Cypriot archaeologist
- Porphyrios of Kafsokalyvia (1906–1991), Greek Athonite hieromonk and Eastern Orthodox saint
- Demetri Porphyrios (born 1949), Greek architect
- Porfirije, Serbian Patriarch (born 1961), 46th Patriarch of the Serbian Orthodox Church

== See also ==
- Born in the purple, Porphyrogénnētos , Byzantine term for the children of emperors, after a supposed porphyry-lined birthing room in the palace
- Porfirio (disambiguation), various uses, including a Spanish surname
- Porfiry, a Russian given name
- Tyrian purple or Porphyra, a purple-red natural dye
- "Porphyria's Lover", originally published as "Porphyria", a poem by Robert Browning
- Porphyria, a disease giving purple urine
- Porphyrins, a group of organic compounds
