= Haida =

Haida may refer to:

== Haida people ==
Many uses of the word derive from the name of an Indigenous people of the Pacific Northwest Coast of North America.

- Haida people, an Indigenous people of Canada and the United States
  - Council of the Haida Nation, their collective government body in British Columbia
  - Haida language, their language
  - Haida argillite carvings, an art form that is a Haida specialty
- Haida manga, a hybrid art form combining traditional Haida art and Japanese manga

== Places ==
- Haida, an old name for Nový Bor
- Haida Gwaii, meaning "Islands of the People", formerly called the Queen Charlotte Islands
- Haida Islands, a different archipelago near Bella Bella, British Columbia

== Ships ==
- SS Haida, a 1909-built steamship that served in the US Navy as USS Quincy (AK-10)
- USCGC Haida (WPG-45), United States Coast Guard cutter in commission from 1921 to 1947
- Haida, a German-built American yacht of 1929, in US Navy service 1940–1946 as USS Argus (PY-14); currently yacht Haida 1929
- HMCS Haida (G63), Canadian Tribal-class destroyer that served from 1943 to 1963

== Education ==
- Hai-Da, abbreviation for Hainan University, from the Mandarin Chinese Hainan Daxue

== People with the surname ==
- Mahjoub Haïda (born 1970), Moroccan middle-distance runner
- Moses Haida (fl. 17th–18th centuries), German mathematician
- Samuel Haida (1626–1685), Bohemian Kabbalist
- Yukihiko Haida (灰田 有紀彦; 1909–1986), Japanese composer and musician

== Literature and media ==
- Haida, a character in Aggretsuko

== See also ==
- Hada (disambiguation)
- Hadda (disambiguation)
