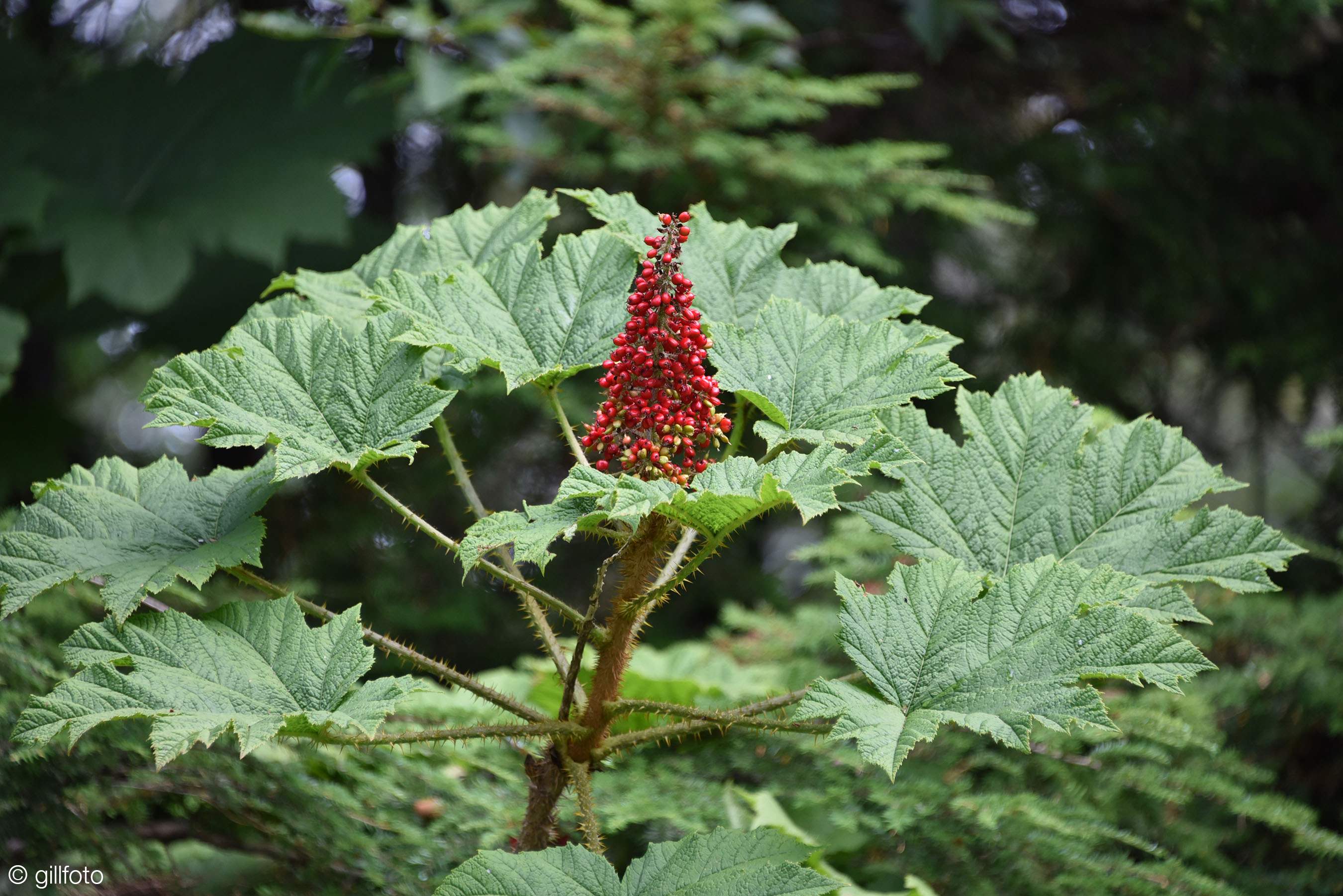
- Devil's club in Juneau, Alaska

Conservation status
- Secure (NatureServe)

Scientific classification
- Kingdom: Plantae
- Clade: Tracheophytes
- Clade: Angiosperms
- Clade: Eudicots
- Clade: Asterids
- Order: Apiales
- Family: Araliaceae
- Genus: Oplopanax
- Species: O. horridus

Binomial name
- Oplopanax horridus (Sm.) Miq.

Synonyms
- Echinopanax horridum

= Devil's club =

Species of flowering plant

Devil's club or Devil's walking stick (Oplopanax horridus, Araliaceae; syn. Echinopanax horridus, Fatsia horrida) is a large understory shrub native to the rainforests of the Pacific Northwest, but also disjunct on islands in Lake Superior. It is noted for its large palmate leaves and erect, woody stems covered in noxious and irritating spines. It is also known as Alaskan ginseng and similar names, although it is not a true ginseng. In Tlingit it is known as S’áxt’.

== Description ==
Devil's club generally grows to 1 to 1.5 metres (3 1/2 to 5 ft) tall. Some stands located in rainforest gullies or moist, undisturbed areas can reach heights of 3 to 5 m (10 to 16 1/2 ft) or more. The spines are found along the upper and lower surfaces of veins of its leaves as well as the stems. The leaves are spirally arranged on the stems, simple, palmately lobed with 5–13 lobes, 20 to 40 centimetres (8 to 15 1/2 in) across. The flowers are produced in dense umbels 10 to 20 cm (4 to 8 in) diameter, each flower small, with five greenish-white petals. The fruit is a small red drupe 4 to 7 millimetres (1/8 to 1/4 in) diameter.

The plants are slow growing and take many years to reach seed-bearing maturity; populations can persist and spread through clonal reproduction via rhizomes and layering. Concerns about harvesting impacts arise from its slow growth and ecological characteristics rather than solely from limited seed production.

Devil's club reproduces by forming clonal colonies by means of rhizomes. What can appear to be several different plants may actually have all been one plant originally, with the clones detaching themselves after becoming established by laying down roots.

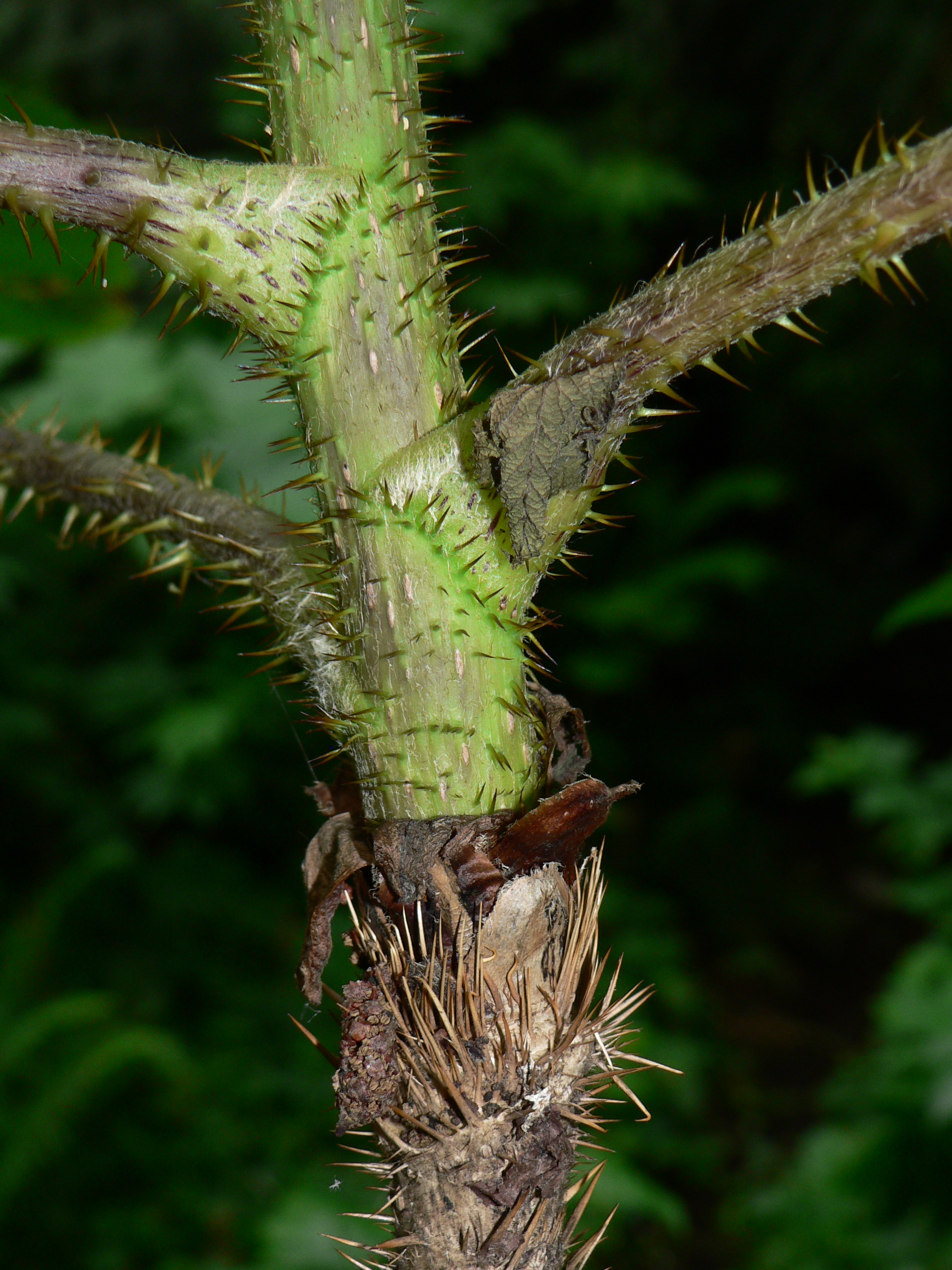
Spines on stem, Washington

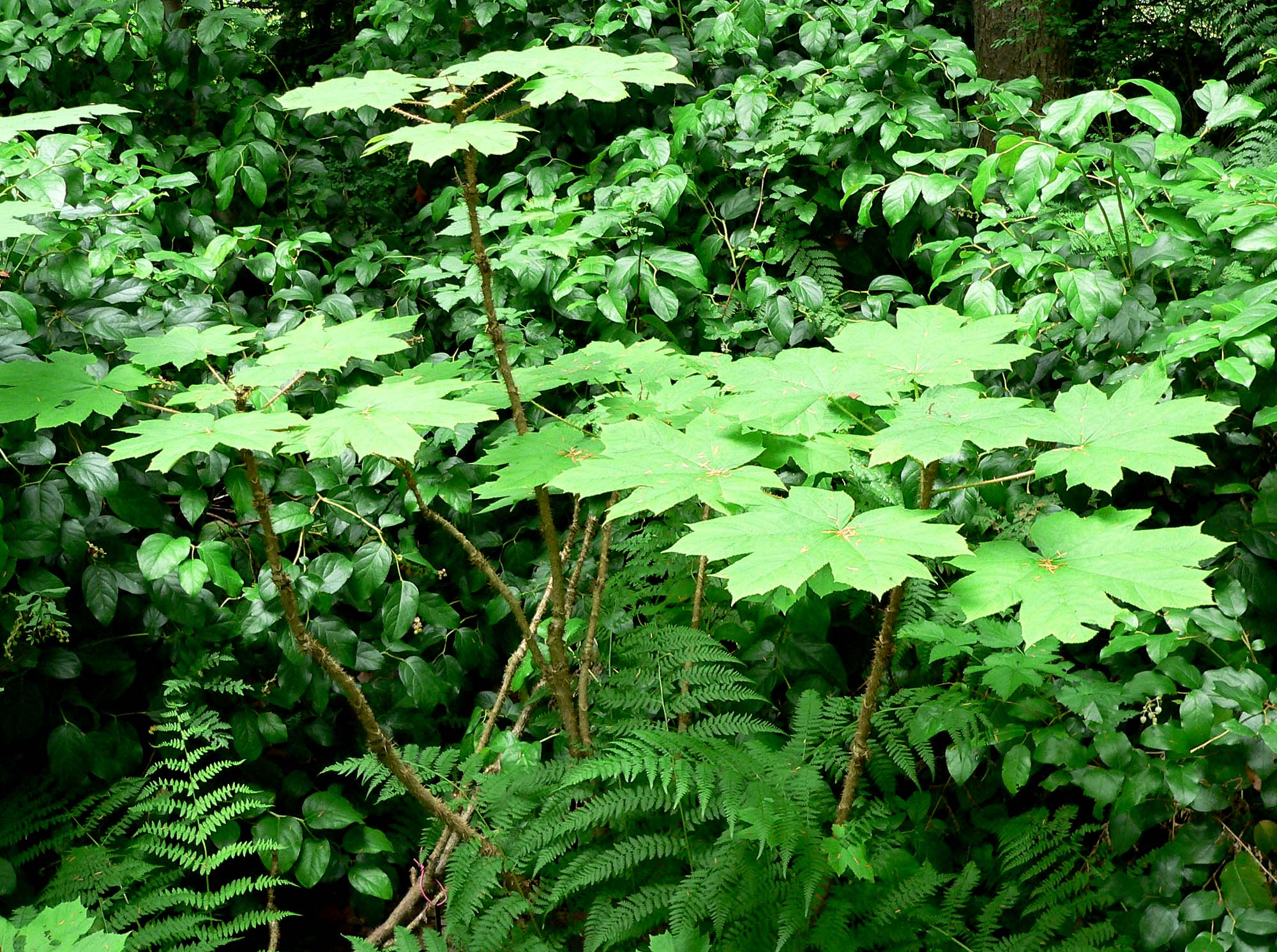
Large leaves on the top of stems

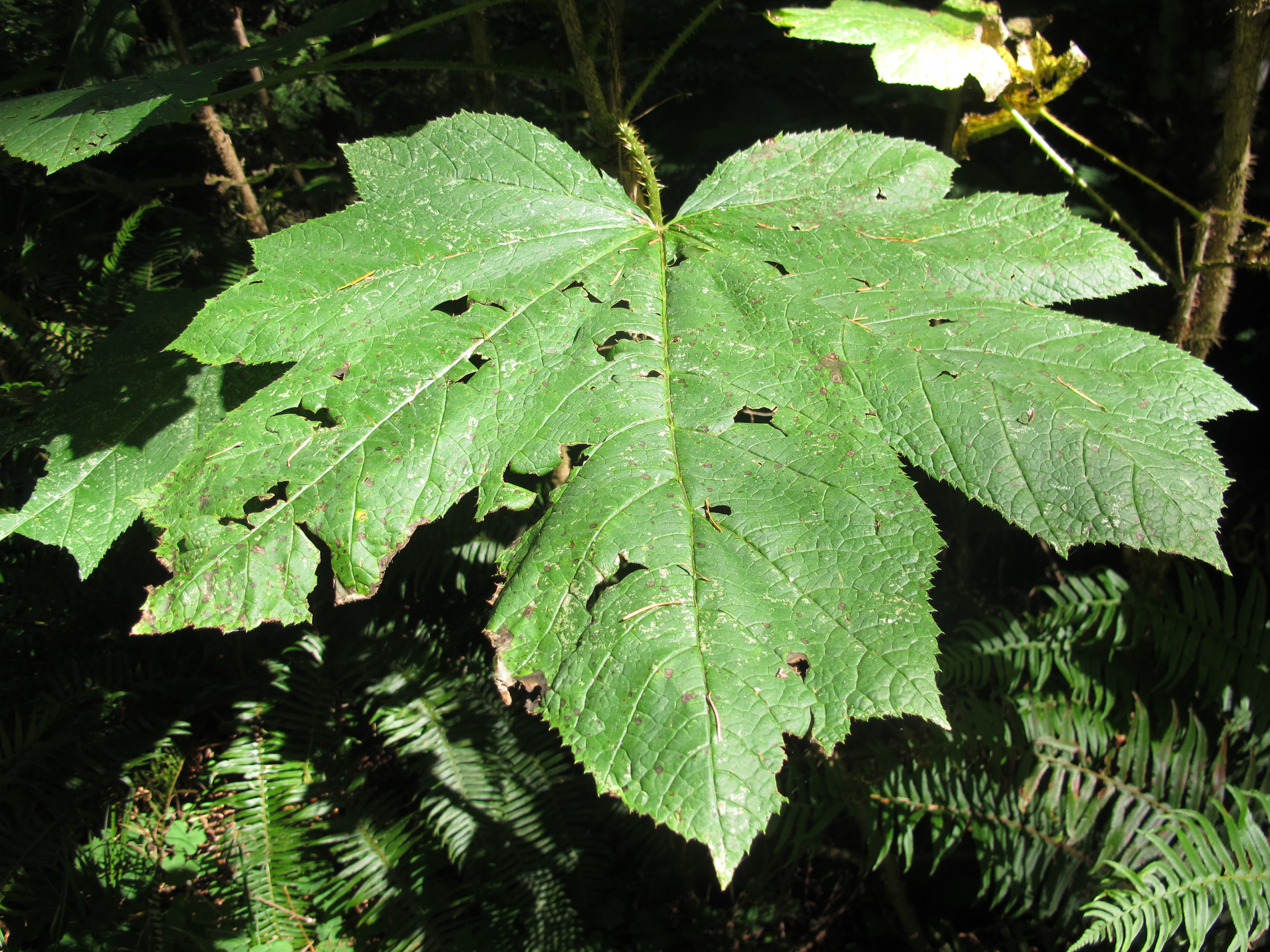
Leaf in late summer

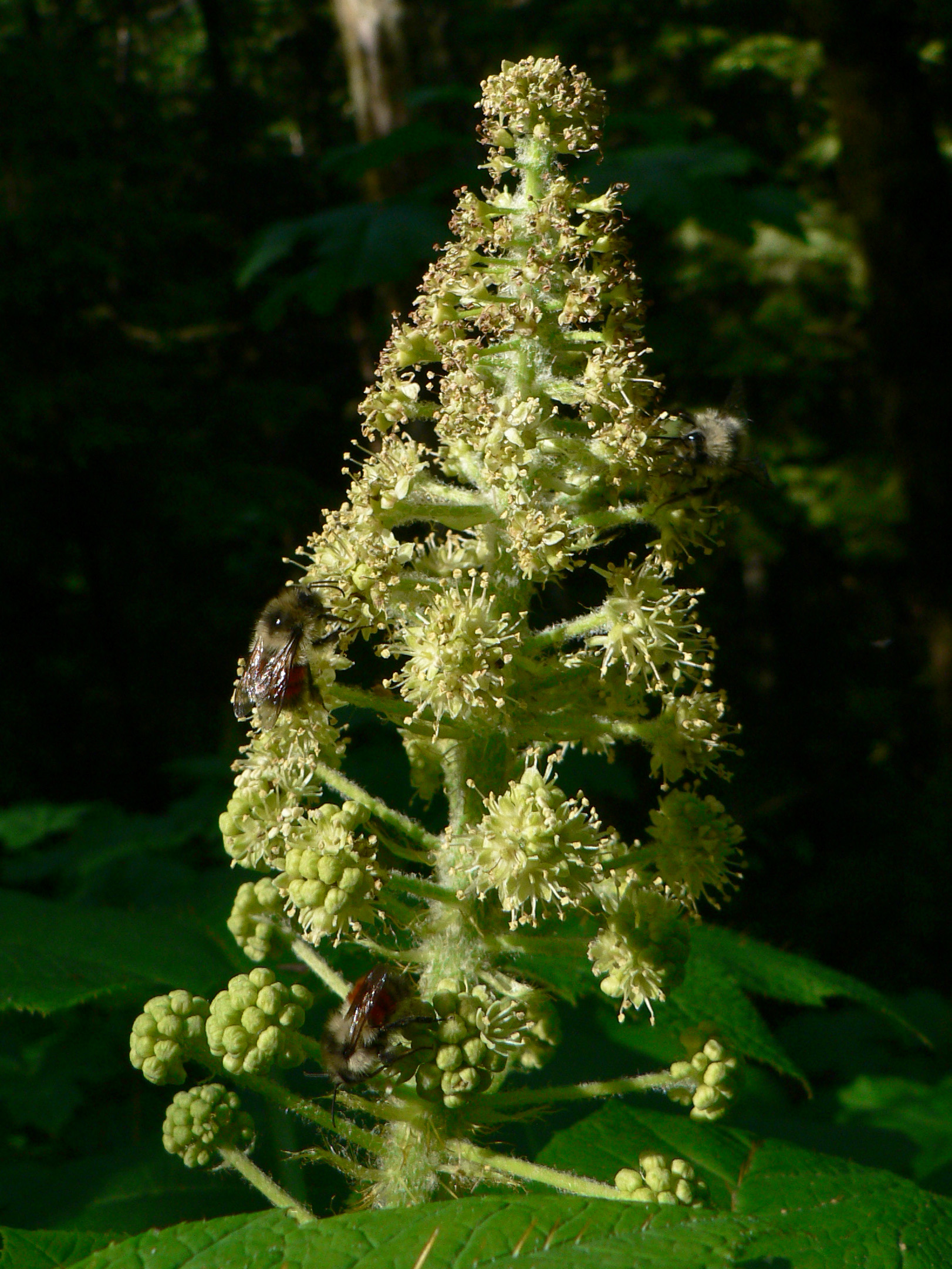
Flowers and bumblebees

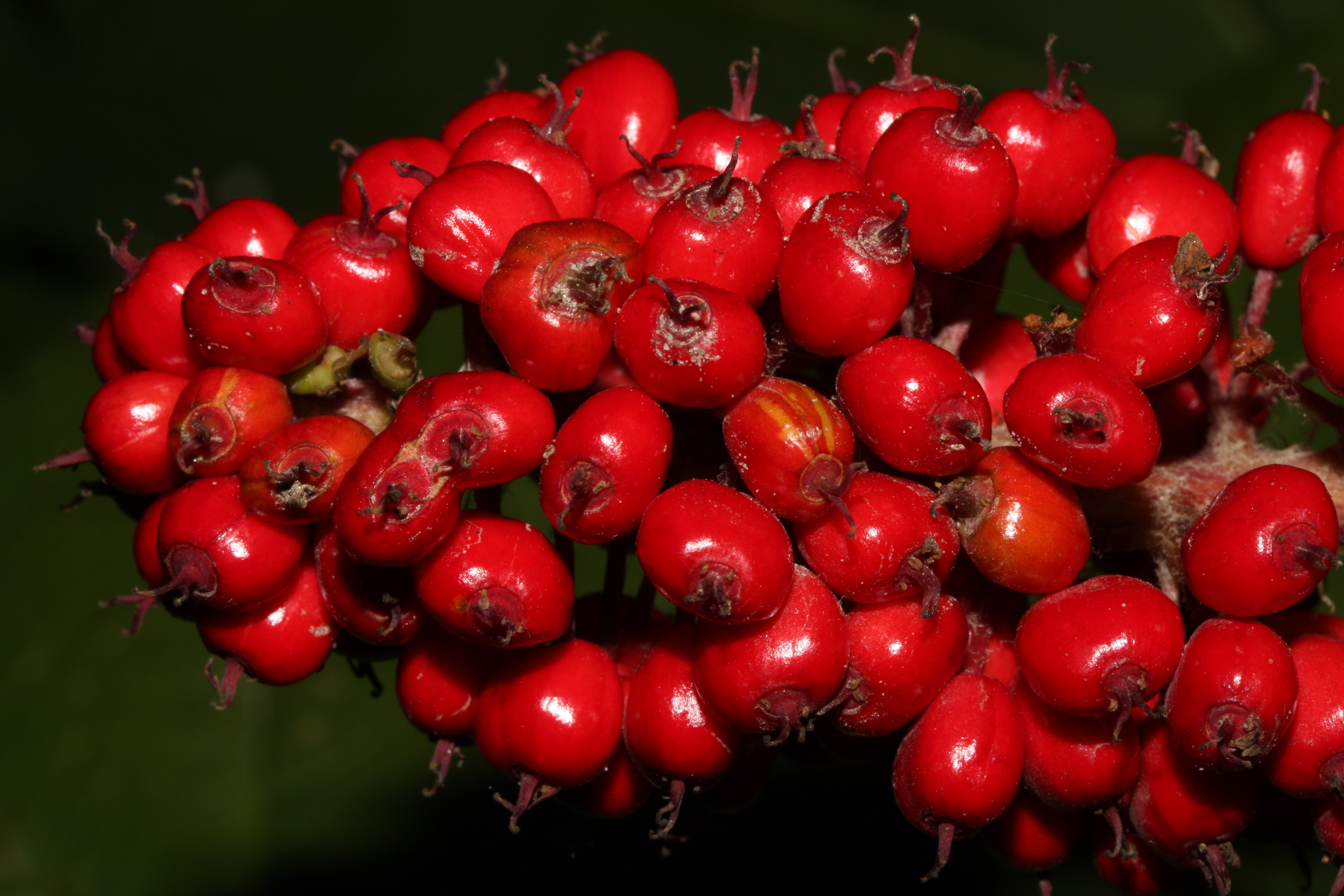
Shiny red drupes in elongate clusters, Washington

== Distribution and habitat ==
This species usually grows in moist, dense forest habitats, and is most abundant in old-growth conifer forests in the Pacific Northwest. It is found from southcentral Alaska south to Oregon, and eastward to western Alberta and Montana. Disjunct native populations also occur over 1,500 kilometres (930 miles) away in Lake Superior on Isle Royale and Passage Island, Michigan and Porphyry Island and Slate Island, Ontario.

== Ecology ==
Bears and other wildlife consume the berries.

== Adverse effects ==
The berry is inedible to humans. Touching the spiny plant may cause irritation.

== Uses ==
Traditionally, the charcoal from the stalks is still used to make ceremonial and protective face paints, and among the Ditidaht and neighboring groups, it was equally significant to red ochre as a symbolic link to the spirit world. Indigenous peoples such as the Tlingit and Haida have used the plant as traditional medicine for ailments such as adult-onset diabetes, as well as rheumatoid arthritis.

The plant has been used ceremonially by the Tlingit, Tsimshian, and Haida people residing in Southeast Alaska and coastal British Columbia. A piece of Devil's club hung over a doorway is said to ward off evil. The plant is harvested and used in a variety of ways, most commonly as an oral tea in traditional settings, but also poultices and ointments. Native Americans also dried and pulverized the bark for use as a deodorant and used the mashed berries to clean hair.

Because devil's club is related to American ginseng, some people try to market the plant as an 'adaptogen'. The plant has been harvested for this purpose and sold widely as "Alaskan ginseng". Despite some morphological similarities between the araliaceous members Panax ('true' ginseng), Eleutherococcus senticosus ("Siberian ginseng") and devil's club, the different genera are chemically diverse.

=== Research ===
An in vitro study showed that extracts of devil's club might inhibit tuberculosis. Another study suggested devil's club may reduce leukemia burden in mice engrafted with murine C1498 acute myeloid leukemia cells.
