= List of shipwrecks in October 1886 =

The list of shipwrecks in October 1886 includes ships sunk, foundered, grounded, or otherwise lost during October 1886.

== 2 October ==
List of shipwrecks: 2 October 1886
Ship	State	Description
Garibaldi	United States	The schooner was destroyed by fire off Murder Island, Nova Scotia, Canada. Her crew were rescued.

== 3 October ==
List of shipwrecks: 3 October 1886
Ship	State	Description
Mary Lester	United Kingdom	The ship departed from Glasgow, Renfrewshire for Rio de Janeiro, Brazil. No further trace, reported missing.

== 4 October ==
List of shipwrecks: 4 October 1886
Ship	State	Description
Greenock	United Kingdom	The lighter was run into by the steamship Escurial (Flag unknown) and sank in the Clyde at Port Glasgow, Renfrewshire.

== 5 October ==
List of shipwrecks: 5 October 1886
Ship	State	Description
La Mascotte	United States	The steamship was destroyed by fire in the Mississippi River at Crawford's Landing, 125 nautical miles (232 km) downstream of St. Louis, Missouri. Ten passengers and 22 crew died.
Mandarin	United Kingdom	The steamship was driven ashore on Holy Isle, in the Firth of Clyde. She was on a voyage from Glasgow, Renfrewshire to Bordeaux, Gironde, France. She was refloated with assistance and found to be leaky.
Theodore	Russia	The brig was driven ashore at Whitburn, County Durham, United Kingdom. Her crew were rescued by the Sunderland Lifeboat. She was on a voyage from Riga to Sunderland, County Durham.

== 6 October ==
List of shipwrecks: 6 October 1886
Ship	State	Description
Guilherme	Flag unknown	The ship was abandoned at sea. Her crew were rescued. She was on a voyage from Porto, Portugal to St. Simons, Georgia, United States.
Juliet	United Kingdom	The full-rigged ship was wrecked on the Gingerbread Shoal. She was on a voyage from Cardiff, Glamorgan to New Orleans, Louisiana, United States.
Julius	Germany	The barque was abandoned in the Dogger Bank. Her crew were rescued by the smack Boy Roland (United Kingdom). Julius was on a voyage from Rotterdam, South Holland, Netherlands to Stettin.
Robert Brown	United Kingdom	The ship was run into by the steamship Tolka (United Kingdom) and sank in the Belfast Lough off Carrickfergus, County Antrim. Her crew were rescued by Tolka.
Sinclair	United Kingdom	The cutter yacht was driven ashore at Yarmouth, Isle of Wight.

== 7 October ==
List of shipwrecks: 7 October 1886
Ship	State	Description
Pegli	Italy	The ship departed from Swansea, Glamorgan, United Kingdom for Table Bay. No further trace, reported missing.

== 8 October ==
List of shipwrecks: 8 October 1886
Ship	State	Description
Agnes	United Kingdom	The steamship was driven ashore and wrecked in Caswell Bay. Her crew survived. She was on a voyage from Rouen, Seine-Inférieure, France to Swansea, Glamorgan. An attempt at salvage failed when she was driven further ashore the next day. She was abandoned as a total loss. She broke up on 15 October.
Felix Depeaux	France	The steamship collided with the steamship Holmside (United Kingdom) and foundered in the North Sea off Whitby, Yorkshire, United Kingdom. Her crew were rescued by Holmside.
Tramurora	Spain	The barque was disabled in a hurricane and foundered off the Dry Tortugas with the loss of seven of her eleven crew. Survivors took to a raft; they were rescued by a schooner on 13 October. She was on a voyage from Barcelona to Havana, Cuba.
Warwick	United Kingdom	The full-rigged ship ran ashore on the coast of Heligoland with the loss of two of her crew. She was on a voyage from Taltal, Chile to Hamburg, Germany.

== 9 October ==
List of shipwrecks: 9 October 1886
Ship	State	Description
Ant	United Kingdom	The ship departed from a port on the west coast of Ireland for a British port. No further trace, presumed foundered with the loss of all hands.
Cambria	United Kingdom	The abandoned schooner was taken in to Munlara, County Donegal. She had been on a voyage from Glasgow, Renfrewshire to Sligo.
Garam	United Kingdom	The full-rigged ship was driven ashore and severely damaged at Seaham, County Durham. She was refloated and towed in to West Hartlepool, County Durham.
Francis	United Kingdom	The schooner was wrecked near Tiraun Point, County Mayo. Her crew were rescued.
Treasaurora	Spain	The barque foundered in the Atlantic Ocean off the Dry Tortugas with the loss of seven of her thirteen crew. Survivors were rescued from a raft on 14 October by the schooner Anna Hutcheson (United States).
LH 1088	United Kingdom	The steam fishing boat was driven ashore and wrecked 1 nautical mile (1.9 km) south of Newburgh, Fife.

== 10 October ==
List of shipwrecks: 10 October 1886
Ship	State	Description
San Juan	Spain	The steamship put in to Key West, Florida, United States on fire. She was on a voyage from New Orleans, Louisiana, United States to Liverpool, Lancashire, United Kingdom.
Unnamed	United Kingdom	The yacht foundered off Crookhaven, County Cork with the loss of all hands.

== 11 October ==
List of shipwrecks: 11 October 1886
Ship	State	Description
Henrys	United Kingdom	The brig was abandoned in the Atlantic Ocean. Her eight crew were rescued by Max Morris (United States). Henrys was on a voyage from Quebec City, Canada to Southampton, Hampshire.
Onward	United Kingdom	The schooner was abandoned off the Gull Rock, Cornwall. Her crew survived. She was on a voyage from an Irish port to Padstow, Cornwall.

== 12 October ==
List of shipwrecks: 12 October 1886
Ship	State	Description
Hammonia	Germany	The barque sprang a leak and sank at Yantai, China.
Lord Jeffrey	United Kingdom	The steamship departed from the River Tyne for Port Said, Egypt. No further trace, reported overdue.
North Devon	United Kingdom	The steamship was driven ashore at Workington, Cumberland. She was on a voyage from Cartagena, Spain to Workington.
Wenonah	United Kingdom	The schooner sprang a leak and was abandoned in the Atlantic Ocean. Her eight crew were rescued by an Italian barque. She was on a voyage from Tuacacas, Venezuela to Marseille, Bouches-du-Rhône, France.

== 13 October ==
List of shipwrecks: 13 October 1886
Ship	State	Description
Auckland Castle	United Kingdom	The steamship ran aground in the Yenikale Strait. She was refloated the next day.
Scotia	United Kingdom	The barque was driven ashore and wrecked in the Hoorn Islands.
Selah Chamberlain	United States	Selah Chamberlain, 13 June 2022. During a voyage from Milwaukee, Wisconsin, to Escanaba, Michigan, with the schooner barge Fayette Brown (United States) in tow, the three-masted steam barge collided with the steamship John Pridgeon Jr. (United States) in Lake Michigan about 7 nautical miles (13 km; 8.1 mi) off the coast of Wisconsin. Selah Chamberlain cut her towline to Fayette Brown and headed toward shore, but sank 15 minutes after the collision off Sheboygan, Wisconsin, 2 nautical miles (3.7 km; 2.3 mi) northeast of Sheboygan Point in 90 feet (27 m) of water with the loss of five of her crew. Her wrecks in the Wisconsin Shipwreck Coast National Marine Sanctuary at 43°46.196′N 087°39.401′W.

== 14 October ==
List of shipwrecks: 14 October 1886
Ship	State	Description
Belle Mitchell	United States	The schooner sank in a gale in Lake Erie between Conneaut, Ohio and the base of Long Point Peninsula. Lost with all nine hands.
Ben-y-Gloe	United Kingdom	The ship capsized off Nash Point, Glamorgan and drove ashore with the loss of one of her 30-plus crew. Survivor were rescued by rocket apparatus. She was on a voyage from Singapore, Straits Settlements to Penarth, Glamorgan.
Castleton	United Kingdom	The steamship departed from Penarth, Glamorgan for Saint Lucia. No further trace, reported missing.
George M. Case	United States	The schooner sank in a gale 3 nautical miles (5.6 km) off Port Colborne, Ontario, Canada with the loss of three of her crew. Survivors were rescued by the tug W. A. Moore (Flag unknown). George M. Case was on a voyage from Chicago, Illinois to Buffalo, New York.
Indus	United Kingdom	The steamship foundered off Trevose Head, Cornwall. Her 29 crew were rescued by the Port Issac Lifeboat Richard and Sarah ( Royal National Lifeboat Institution) and a gig. Indus was on a voyage from Cardiff, Glamorgan to Tenerife, Canary Islands.
Malleny	United Kingdom	The ship struck the Tusker Rock and foundered in the Bristol Channel with the loss of all twenty crew. She was on a voyage from Cardiff, Glamorgan to Rio de Janeiro, Brazil. The wreck came ashore at Westward Ho!, Devon.
O. M. Bond	United States	The schooner was driven ashore on Rond Eau Point, Ontario, Canada in Lake Erie in a severe gale and was wrecked, a total loss, with the loss of two of her crew.
W.R. Hanna	United States	The scow schooner was driven ashore and destroyed by a gale in Lake Erie, Ontario, Canada. No loss of life was reported.

== 15 October ==
List of shipwrecks: 15 October 1886
Ship	State	Description
Gina	United Kingdom	The barque was driven ashore at Penarth, Glamorgan. She was on a voyage from Dunkirk, Nord to Penarth.
Henry	United Kingdom	The pilot boat foundered off Lundy Island, Devon in heavy gales. Her four crew were rescued.
Ida	United Kingdom	The schooner broke from her moorings at Arklow, County Wicklow. She collided with several fishing boats, sinking some of them, and was wrecked.
J. W. A.	United Kingdom	The schooner was abandoned off Fishguard, Pembrokeshire. Her crew were rescued by the Fishguard Lifeboat Sir Edward Perrot ( Royal National Lifeboat Institution).
Lady But	United Kingdom	The ship was driven ashore and wrecked in Sheephaven Bay. She was on a voyage from Aberdovey, Merionethshire to Sligo.
Matilda	United Kingdom	The barge was driven ashore near Bognor, Sussex. The whereabouts of her crew was unknown.
Ocean Beauty	United Kingdom	The barque was driven ashore at Aberavon, Glamorgan with the loss of two of her fifteen crew. She was on a voyage from Swansea, Glamorgan, to Valparaíso, Chile. She subsequently became a wreck.
Rochfort	United Kingdom	The smack was driven out to sea from Saundersfoot, Pembrokeshire and sank in Carnarvon Bay. Her crew were rescued.
Roseola	United Kingdom	The schooner was driven ashore and wrecked in St. Brides Bay. Her crew were rescued by rocket apparatus. She was on a voyage from Dublin to Bristol, Gloucestershire.
Teviotdale	United Kingdom	The barque was wrecked on Cefn Sidan sands, near Pembrey, Carmarthenshire with the loss of seventeen of her crew of 29 or 30. Ten survivors were rescued by the Ferryside Lifeboat. She was on a voyage from Cardiff, Glamorgan to Bombay, India. Some of the ship's cargo of coal was pillaged.
Valeria	United Kingdom	The steamship was abandoned off the north Devon coast. Her nine crew were rescued by the Clovelly Lifeboat Graham Hughes ( Royal National Lifeboat Institution). Valeria was on a voyage from Cardiff to Portland, Dorset.
Unnamed	Flag unknown	The barque foundered off the Isle of Wight, United Kingdom.
Unnamed	Norway	The barque was driven ashore in Port Queen Bay, Cornwall with the loss of eleven lives.

== 16 October ==
List of shipwrecks: 16 October 1886
Ship	State	Description
Albert Wilhelm	Germany	The brig hit the Stones reef, near the Godrevy Lighthouse, Cornwall, United Kingdom and was driven on to the sands at Lelant, Cornwall. Five of her nine crew were saved by the Hayle Lifeboat Isis ( Royal National Lifeboat Institution) and four by breeches buoy or rocket apparatus.
Alliance	Norway	The barque was wrecked on the Doom Bar with the loss of four of her eleven crew. Survivors were rescued by the Padstow Lifeboat.
Ariel	Norway	The barque collided with the brigantine Progress (Norway) and sank in the English Channel. Her eight crew were rescued by Progress. Ariel was on a voyage from Riga, Russia to Le Tréport, Seine-Inférieure, France.
Bellaport	United Kingdom	The barque was driven ashore at Ballinskelligs, County Kerry with the loss of all hands. She was subsequently refloated and towed in to Kenmare, County Kerry by the steamship Fastnet (United Kingdom).
Ellida	United Kingdom	The ship was driven ashore and wrecked at Dover, Kent.
Frederick Start	Norway	The barque was driven ashore and wrecked at Pentire Head, Cornwall with the loss of eleven of her twelve crew.
Frederick William	United Kingdom	The schooner was driven ashore in Swansea Bay. Her crew were rescued by a steamship.
Inversnaid	United Kingdom	The barque was last seen in a disabled condition in the Bristol Channel off Lundy Island, Devon whilst on a voyage from Penarth, Glamorgan to Singapore, Straits Settlements. Presumed foundered with the loss of all seventeen crew, wreckage from the ship was sighted by the tug Flying Fox (United Kingdom).
Leon Raimundo	United Kingdom	The collier was driven ashore near Margate, Kent. She was refloated and towed in to Dover.
Nancy McSweeney	United Kingdom	The brig capsized off Newport, Monmouthshire.
Nash	United Kingdom	The ship was lost in Swansea Bay.
Unnamed	Flag unknown	The barque foundered off Trebarwith, Cornwall with the loss of all hands, between twelve and twenty lives.
Three unnamed vessels	Flags unknown	The ships were lost in Swansea Bay.

== 17 October ==
List of shipwrecks: 17 October 1886
Ship	State	Description
Independent	United Kingdom	The steamship foundered in the Swash, off the coast of Somerset. Her crew survived. She was on a voyage from Sydney to Bridgwater, Somerset.
Mary Seymour	United Kingdom	The brig was wrecked at Spithead, Hampshire.
Rutland	United Kingdom	The barque was abandoned in the Bristol Channel off Lundy Island, Devon. Her thirteen crew were rescued by the steamship Carn Brea (United Kingdom). Rutland was on a voyage from Quebec City, Canada to Greenock, Renfrewshire. She was subsequently towed in to Milford Haven, Pembrokeshire.
Sarah Anderson	United Kingdom	The barque sank at Trebarwith Strand, Cornwall with the loss of all on board. She was on a voyage from Falmouth, Cornwall to Fleetwood, Lancashire.

== 18 October ==
List of shipwrecks: 18 October 1886
Ship	State	Description
Atros	United Kingdom	The steamship was driven ashore and wrecked at the Pointe de la Coubre, Gironde, France. She was on a voyage from New York, United States to Bordeaux, Gironde.
Unnamed	Flag unknown	The ship was driven ashore at the Pointe de la Coubre.
Unnamed	Norway	The barque was abandoned at sea. Her crew were rescued by the steamship Lydian Monarch (United Kingdom).

== 19 October ==
List of shipwrecks: 19 October 1886
Ship	State	Description
Wexford	United Kingdom	The ship foundered off Lundy Island, Devon.

== 20 October ==
List of shipwrecks: 20 October 1886
Ship	State	Description
Benalder	United Kingdom	The steamship caught fire at London. The fire was extinguished.
Brilliant	United Kingdom	The barque collided with another barque off Dungeness, Kent. A crew member was rescued in a dying condition by the pilot cutter No. 1 (United Kingdom. Brilliant was taken in tow for Dover by the tug Ben Nevis (United Kingdom) but consequently sank 1 1/2 nautical miles (2.8 km) south west of Folkestone, Kent.
Louis	United Kingdom	The dumb barge was run into by Juana Nancy (United Kingdom) and sankat Charlton, Kent.
Maude, and Teutonia (SS Teutonia (1881), British or SS Teutonia (1878), German? -->	United Kingdom; Flag unknown	The steamship Teutonia collided with the Thames barge Maude in the River Thames at Northfleet, Kent. Both vessels were beached on the Essex shore.
Neptunus	Norway	The ship foundered in the North Sea. Her crew were rescued by the smack John Wintringham (United Kingdom). Neptunus was on a voyage from Dundee, Forfarshire, United Kingdom to Christiania.

== 21 October ==
List of shipwrecks: 21 October 1886
Ship	State	Description
Express	United Kingdom	The steam trawler was wrecked on the Longscar Rocks, on the coast of County Durham. Her seven crew were rescued by the Seaton Carew Lifeboat.
Ilex	Norway	The barque ran aground on the Goodwin Sands, Kent, United Kingdom. She was refloated with assistance and taken in tow for the River Thames by the tug Zealandia (United Kingdom).

== 22 October ==
List of shipwrecks: 22 October 1886
Ship	State	Description
Cambrian Princess	United Kingdom	The ship was driven ashore in the River Thames at Thamesmead, Kent.
Clare	United Kingdom	The steamship was driven ashore in the River Thames at Barking, Essex.
Falls of Dee	United Kingdom	The ship was driven ashore in the River Thames at Thamesmead.
Little Briton	United Kingdom	The tug was driven ashore in the River Thames at Barking.
Stormcock	United Kingdom	The tug was driven ashore in the River Thames at Thamesmead. She was on a voyage from London to Liverpool, Lancashire.

== 24 October ==
List of shipwrecks: 24 October 1886
Ship	State	Description
Irene	United Kingdom	The schooner collided with the steamship Dawdon (United Kingdom) and sank in the River Thames with the loss of her captain. Irene was on a voyage from Hull, Yorkshire to Gravesend, Kent.
Kate	(United Kingdom of Great Britain and Ireland) Guernsey	The brig ran aground off Southend, Essex. She was refloated with the assistance of a tug and found to be leaky.
Medelin	Ottoman Empire	The steamship ran aground at Cape Drepano, Greece and was abandoned by all on board, more than 800 people.
Normanton	United Kingdom	The cargo ship was wrecked in heavy wind and rain off the coast of what is now Wakayama Prefecture, Japan. The European officers and crew abandoned ship and reached safety, leaving the twelve Chinese and Indian crewman and all 25 Japanese passengers behind to fend for themselves. All the Japanese passengers died.
Samuel J. Tilden	United States	The schooner was rammed and sunk at anchor in the St. Clair River 2 nautical miles (3.7 km) downstream of Port Huron, Michigan by Arabia (United States). The wreck was raised on 28 October. Samuel J. Tilden was repaired, and returned to service in late 1887.
Tonquin	French Navy	The transport ship was driven ashore on Port-Cros, Hyères. She was refloated the next day.
William Rudolph	United States	The steam barge caught fire off Grosse Point, Michigan. She was scuttled by the steam barge Cleveland (United States) to prevent destruction.

== 25 October ==
List of shipwrecks: 25 October 1886
Ship	State	Description
Queen	United Kingdom	The steamship was severely damaged by fire at Liverpool, Lancashire.

== 27 October ==
List of shipwrecks: 27 October 1886
Ship	State	Description
Sumatra	Netherlands	The steamship was driven ashore at Chesil Beach, Dorset, United Kingdom. She was on a voyage from Java, Netherlands East Indies to Amsterdam, North Holland. She was refloated the next day with assistance from the tugs Commodore and Queen (both United Kingdom and was assisted in to Portland, Dorset.

== 28 October ==
List of shipwrecks: 28 October 1886
Ship	State	Description
Minerva	United Kingdom	The steamship collided with the steamship Borderer (United Kingdom) and sank in the River Thames at Gravesend, Kent with the loss of seven of the 26 people on board. Survivors were rescued by Borderer, the tug Red Rose (United Kingdom) and a Coastguard boat. Minerva was on a voyage from the River Thames to Sunderland, County Durham. She was refloated in mid-November and beached near the Shornemead Fort.

== 29 October ==
List of shipwrecks: 29 October 1886
Ship	State	Description
Ongo	United Kingdom	The brig ran aground at South Shields, County Durham and was severely damaged. She was on a voyage from South Shields to Baltic Port, Russia. She was refloated and put back to South Shields with the assistance of two tugs.

== 30 October ==
List of shipwrecks: 30 October 1886
Ship	State	Description
Saphir	Norway	The brig collided with the steamship Sumatra (Netherlands) and was abandoned in the English Channel off Beachy Head, Sussex, United Kingdom. Her crew were rescued by Sumatra. Saphir was on a voyage from Kragerø to Cardiff, Glamorgan, United Kingdom. She was discovered the next day by the fishing smack Conster (United Kingdom and was then taken in tow by the tug Cambria and was beached at Seaford, Sussex. She was declared a total loss.

== 31 October ==
List of shipwrecks: 31 October 1886
Ship	State	Description
Calypso	Germany	The brig was driven ashore at Jaederren, Denmark. She was on a voyage from Schiedam, South Holland, Netherlands to Stettin. She was a total loss.

== Unknown date ==
List of shipwrecks: Unknown date in October 1886
Ship	State	Description
Acacia	United Kingdom	The ship ran aground on the Zindgir Bank. She was on a voyage from Marianople, Russia to Gibraltar. She was later refloated and taken in to Gallipoli, Ottoman Empire.
Adelheid and Berth	United Kingdom	The barque ran aground on the Domesnes Reef, in the Baltic Sea. She was on a voyage from Riga, Russia to Honfleur, Manche, France.
Albano	United States	The steamship was driven ashore in the "Black River, Chesapeake". She was refloated with the assistance of a steamship and taken in to Baltimore, Maryland.
Anduline	Flag unknown	The ship was abandoned in the Atlantic Ocean.
A. Neff	Canada	The steamship was wrecked on rocks off Porphyria Point, Edward Island, Ontario in late October. Her crew were rescued by a tug.
Archangelsk	Russia	The steamship was driven ashore and wrecked at the Ryvingen Lighthouse, Norway. She was on a voyage from Arkhangelsk to Saint Petersburg.
Autocrat	United Kingdom	The ship was driven ashore on the south point of Öland, Sweden. She was on a voyage from South Shields, County Durham to Kronstadt, Russia. She was later refloated and taken in to Oskarshamn, Sweden.
Baobab	France	The schooner was driven ashore at Pauillac, Gironde and sprang a severe leak.
Belle O'Brien	United States	The full-rigged ship collided with the full-rigged ship Royal George (United Kingdom at Havre de Grâce, Seine-Inférieure, France and was severely damaged.
Benjamin Mollen	Sweden	The ship ran aground on the Cross Sands, in the North Sea off the coast of Norfolk, United Kingdom. She was on a voyage from Stockholm to Great Yarmouth, Norfolk. She was refloated with the assistance of a tug and taken in to Great Yarmouth.
Black Diamond	United Kingdom	The steamship ran aground on the Chapman Sands.
Boswedden	United Kingdom	The schooner was lost in heavy gales off the north Devon or Cornwall coast on or after 15 October. Boswedden's boat was recovered at sea by 21 October, and a brass-bound bucket on Lundy Island, Devon and a table with a ship's notebook near Ilfracombe were also found. She was on a voyage from Briton Ferry, Glamorgan to Penzance, Cornwall.
Britannia	United Kingdom	Wreckage marked "SS Britannia, Glasgow" was found in Bideford Bay, and reported on 17 October at Bideford, Devon after the heavy gales of 14–16 October, though the vessel concerned was not identified.
Carl Oscar	Sweden	The schooner was driven ashore. She was on a voyage from Gothenburg to Dartmouth, Devon. She was refloated and put back to Gothenburg.
Castleton	United Kingdom	The steamship departed from Penarth, Glamorgan for Saint Lucia, West Indies on 14 October with a crew of 23, and was seen in difficulties the following day during heavy gales. Identifable wreckage seen in Bideford Bay was reported from Bideford on 17 October and by the Westward Ho! coastguard on two days later.
Chevychase	United Kingdom	The steam trawler was driven ashore and wrecked at Filey Briggs, Yorkshire. Her crew survived.
Clutha	United Kingdom	The steamship was abandoned at sea on or before 14 October. Her crew were rescued. She was subsequently towed in to Ostend, West Flanders, Belgium.
Conquistador	United Kingdom	The steamship departed from Newport, Monmouthshire for Málaga, Spain on 13 October and lost in heavy gales on or after 14 October; her lifeboat was picked up, waterlogged, on 21 October in 48°50′N 4°50′W, and more identifiable wreckage was later washed up between Mullion Cove and The Lizard, Cornwall including a boat's stern bearing the name Conquistador.
Dovre	Norway	The brig collided with the Grand Bank Lightship (France) at Bordeaux, Gironde and was severely damaged.
Ecossaise	United Kingdom	The steamship was driven ashore on Skagen, Denmark. She was on a voyage from Grangemouth, Stirlingshire to Cronstadt.
Elephant	United Kingdom	The steamship foundered in the English Channel off the coast of Sussex. A boiler intended for HMS Imperieuse, which formed part of her cargo, washed up at Eastbourne.
Faedrelandet	Norway	The steamship ran aground in the Saint Lawrence River. She was on a voyage from Sydney, Nova Scotia to Montreal, Quebec, Canada. She was refloated and found to be leaky. Faedrelandet was taken in to a port for repairs.
Fanny	United Kingdom	The schooner was wrecked south of Maughold Head, Isle of Man.
Fleetwing	United Kingdom	The schooner was driven ashore at St Marys Bay, Kent. She was on a voyage from London to Peterhead, Aberdeenshire.
Gebruder	Germany	The galiot was driven ashore on Nidingen, Sweden. She was on a voyage from Kungsbacka, Sweden to an English port.
General Napier	United Kingdom	The steamship was driven ashore near the Marjaniemi Lighthouse, Sweden.
Georg	Germany	The ship was severely damaged off Ven, Sweden by an onboard explosion. She was on a voyage from Newcastle upon Tyne to Liepāja, Russia. She put in to Copenhagen, Denmark.
Gleneuse	Flag unknown	The ship was driven ashore at Point Lonsdale, Victoria. She was on a voyage from the Charente to Melbourne, Victoria.
Guild Mayor	United Kingdom	The ship was driven ashore near Carrickfergus, County Antrim.
Ida	United Kingdom	The ship was driven ashore on Corsica, France.
Jacoba	Netherlands	The ship foundered at sea. Her crew were rescued.
J. H. Niemann	Germany	The steamship was driven ashore at Thisted, Denmark. She was refloated with the assistance of a steamship and resumed her voyage.
John Taylor	United Kingdom	The steamship foundered on or after 14 October. Her crew were rescued by a steamship. She was on a voyage from Swansea, Glamorgan to Newry, County Antrim.
Lake Huron	Canada	The steamship ran ashore on Madam Island, Nova Scotia. She was on a voyage from Liverpool, Lancashire, United Kingdom to Montreal. She was refloated but had to be beached at Indian Harbour, Nova Scotia.
Lancaster	United Kingdom	The steamship caught fire at Savannah, Georgia, United States.
La Plata	Norway	The brig was driven ashore on Swain, in the Pentland Firth. Her crew were rescued.
Leo	United Kingdom	The steamship was driven ashore on the Isle of Arran. She was refloated and taken in to Ardrossan, Ayrshire for repairs.
Lero	Flag unknown	The steamship was driven ashore in Chesapeake Bay. She was on a voyage from Baltimore, Maryland to Rotterdam, South Holland, Netherlands. She was later refloated with assistance and put back to Baltimore.
Lilian	United Kingdom	The schooner was driven ashore at Tankerness, Orkney Islands in a waterlogged condition.
Martha	Germany	The barque was driven ashore in the Gulf of Onega. Her eight crew survived. She was on a voyage from Trondheim, Norway to Onega, Russia.
Martin	United Kingdom	The sloop collided with a steamship and sank at the mouth of the River Mersey.
Mindet	United Kingdom	The ship was abandoned in the Atlantic Ocean. Her crew were rescued by Saga (United Kingdom). Mindet was on a voyage from Quebec City, Canada to West Hartlepool, County Durham.
Nerbudda	United Kingdom	The full-rigged ship sailed from Penarth for Calcutta, India on 14 October with a crew of 42 and was lost in heavy gales on or after that date. The ship's figurehead and other identifiable wreckage was washed up in Bideford Bay, and reported on 19 October at Bideford.
Nicola	United States	The ship was driven ashore and wrecked on Fortune Island, Bahamas.
O. M. Baird	United States	The schooner was driven ashore at "Eau Point" with the loss of two of her crew. She was on a voyage from Detroit, Michigan to Buffalo, New York.
Ontario	United Kingdom	The steamship ran aground in the Saint Lawrence River. She was on a voyage from Montreal to Bristol, Gloucestershire. Ontario was refloated and found to be leaky. She put back to Montreal for repairs.
Otterburn	United Kingdom	The ship caught fire and was abandoned at sea. Her crew were rescued. She was on a voyage from the Clyde to San Francisco, California, United States.
Owen	United Kingdom	The ship was driven ashore and wrecked at Cape Churchill, Manitoba, Canada. All on board were rescued.
Oxen	United Kingdom	Identifiable wreckage seen in Bideford Bay, and reported by the Charlotte (Flag unknown) on 22 October at Cardiff.
Pan	Sweden	The steamship ran aground at Sandhamn.
Pontyprid	United Kingdom	The steamship ran aground on the Doganastan Shoal, in the Sea of Marmara. She was on a voyage from Brăila, Romania to Gibraltar.
Queen Victoria	United Kingdom	The ship was abandoned at sea. Her crew were rescued by the steamship Navarro (Flag unknown). Queen Victoria was on a voyage from Liverpool to Neufahrwassar, Germany.
Solide	Sweden	The steamship was driven ashore at "Alebeckk", Gotland. She was on a voyage from Saint Petersburg to Stockholm.
Suakim	United Kingdom	The ship caught fire at San Francisco.
HMS Tyne	Royal Navy	The troopship ran aground at Sheerness, Kent. She was refloated.
Upton	United Kingdom	The steamship was driven ashore in the Seine. She was later refloated with assistance.
Wacissa	Flag unknown	The ship was wrecked on the South Reef, off the coast of New Brunswick, Canada.
Wave	United Kingdom	The steamship sank in the Great Belt after 7 October. Her crew survived. She was on a voyage from West Hartlepool, County Durham to Wismar, Germany.
William and Catherine	United Kingdom	The ship was driven ashore at Exmouth, Devon.
Yuba	(Canada)	The ship ran aground and the mouth of the Richelieu River. She was on a voyage from Pictou, Nova Scotia to Sorel, Quebec.
Unnamed	United Kingdom	The barque foundered off Boscastle, Cornwall with the loss of all hands.
