= Hadda =

Hadda may refer to:

- Hadda, Afghanistan
- Hadda, Pakistan
- Hadda, Sana'a, Yemen
- Abdeljalil Hadda
- Rib-Hadda
- Hadda Brooks
- Yapa-Hadda
- Hadda bettle - Henosepilachna vigintioctopunctata

== See also ==
- Hada (disambiguation)
- Haida (disambiguation)
