= Edward Island (Lake Superior) =

Island in Thunder Bay District, Ontario, Canada

- Interactive map of Edward Island

Geography
- Location: Lake Superior
- Coordinates: 48°23′15″N 88°37′26″W
- Area: 6 km^{2} (2.3 sq mi)

Administration
- Canada
- Province: Ontario
- District: Thunder Bay

Demographics
- Population: uninhabited nature reserve

Edward Island is an island in Lake Superior, located southwest of the Black Bay Peninsula in Thunder Bay District, Northwestern Ontario. It is located about 6 kilometres (3.7 mi) from Porphyry Island Provincial Park, about 12 km (7.5 mi) from Sleeping Giant Provincial Park and 16 km (9.9 mi) east of Silver Islet, Ontario. The island is about 42 km (26 mi) east of the city of Thunder Bay.

The entire 600-hectare (2.3 mi^{2}) island constitutes the Edward Island Provincial Park or nature reserve. The island is only accessible by boat and there are no public amenities made available by the park, rather the park is meant to be "dedicated to the preservation of its unique ecosystems". The main attraction to the island is the view of Lake Superior.
