= Porfiry =

Porfiry (Russian: Порфирий; Bulgarian: Порфирий) is a given name in Russian and other Slavic languages, derived from the Greek Porphyry (porphyrios "purple-clad"). It can refer to:

People

- Porfiry Ivanov (1898–1983), Russian mystic
- Porfiry Krylov (painter) (1902-?), a Soviet painter and graphic artist
- Porfiry Krylov (botanist) (1850–1931), a Soviet botanist
- Porphyrius Uspensky (1804–1885), Russian traveller and theologian

Literature

- Porfiry Petrovich, a detective in Crime and Punishment

== See also ==
- Porphyry (disambiguation)
- Porfirio (similar Spanish name)
