= Moses Haida =

Moses ben Joseph Haida (Hebrew: משה בן יוסף היידא, romanized: Moshe ben Yosef Hayda; fl. 17th–18th centuries) was a German mathematician from Hamburg. He was a grandson of Samuel Haida, author of Zikkukin de-nura. He was the author of Sefer ma'aseh ḥoresh ve-ḥoshev, an arithmetic, written at the time of the great fire of Altona (Frankfurt, 1711).

== Publications ==
- Sefer ma'aseh ḥoresh ve-ḥoshev (in Hebrew). Frankfurt. 1711.
