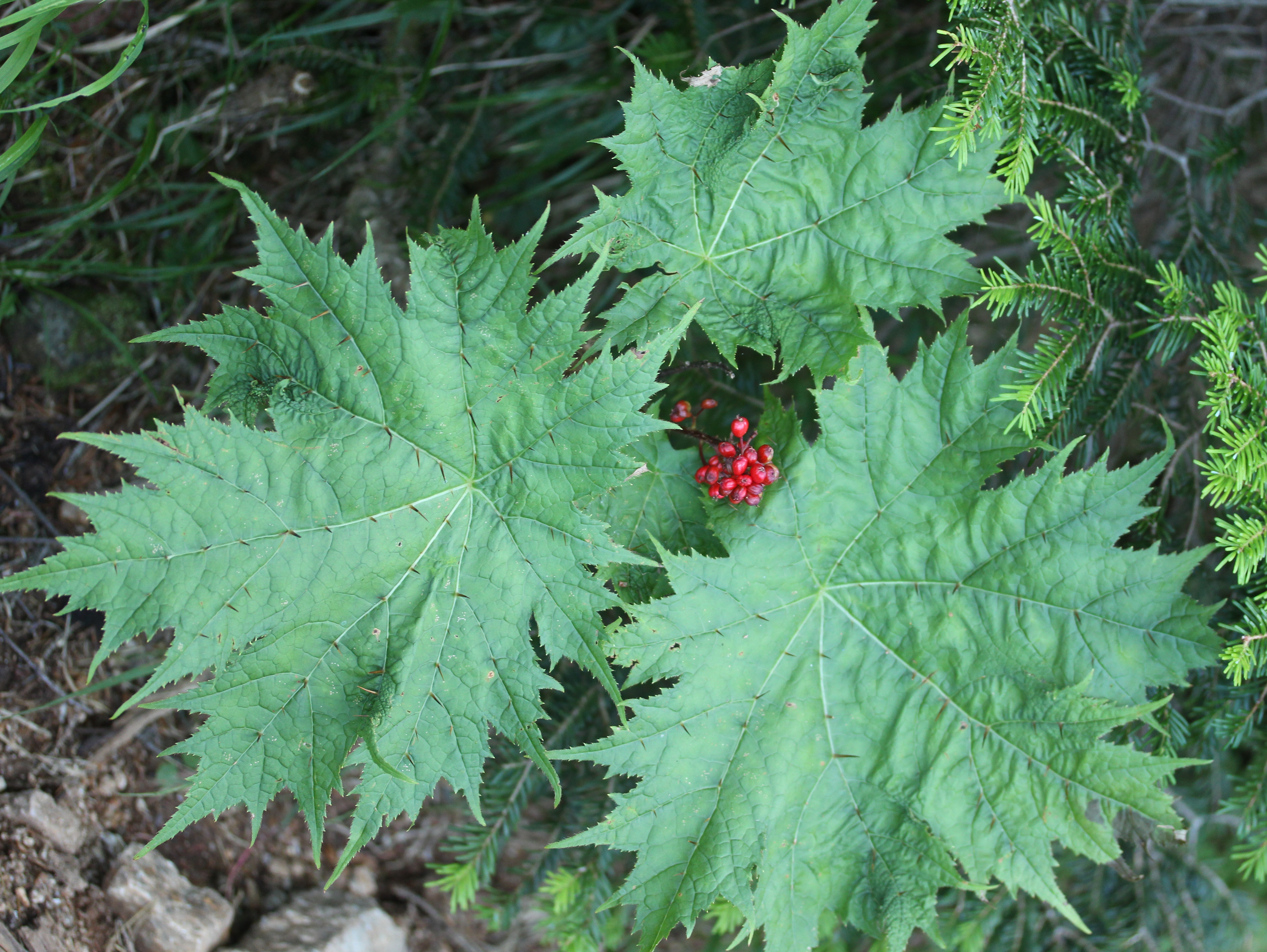
- In Japan

Scientific classification
- Kingdom: Plantae
- Clade: Tracheophytes
- Clade: Angiosperms
- Clade: Eudicots
- Clade: Asterids
- Order: Apiales
- Family: Araliaceae
- Genus: Oplopanax
- Species: O. japonicus

Binomial name
- Oplopanax japonicus Nakai

Synonyms
- Echinopanax horridus subsp. japonicus (Nakai) Hultén 1967 publ. 1968; Echinopanax japonicus Nakai 1924; Aralia faribuki Siebold ex Miq. 1863; Aralia laribuki Keiske ex Miq. 1863; Oplopanax horridus var. brevilobus H.Hara 1955; Oplopanax japonicus var. brevilobus (H.Hara) Yonek. 2005

= Oplopanax japonicus =

Species of shrub

Oplopanax japonicus is species of deciduous shrub that can grow as high as 3 m (9.8 ft) tall. The plant is densely packed with spines that, when touched, cause irritation. This species belongs to a genus that is rich in calcium oxalate, which is toxic to the digestive system.

== Distribution ==
Oplopanax japonicus is naturally found in East Asia, specifically in Japan. It is usually found in the coniferous shady forest of northern Japan. One species is also found in China and North America.

== Habitat and ecology ==
Oplopanax japonicus grow in woodland garden, dappled shade, and shady edges, but do not grow in full shade. The optimal cultivation environment is a moist, well drained and retentive soil.

== Morphology ==
Oplopanax japonicus is a hardy frost resistant shrub. It is also the most spiny member of the ginseng family. It forms seldom and randomly branched stems that are approximately 1 m (3 ft 3 in) long. The plant is deciduous, can grow up to 3 m (9.8 ft) tall, and has bulky branches with solid yellow-orange spines. The stem is covered in spines and stocky. Petiole 3–10 cm (1.2–3.9 in), densely covered with setae. The leaf blade is approximately circular to oblate, approximately 15–30 cm (5.9–11.8 in) wide, and the two surfaces are usually 5–7 lobed. The shape of the lobes are triangular or broadly triangular, the base cordate, margins irregularly serrate, and the apex acute to slightly acuminate. They have ornamental qualities but are armed with spines. Both the stem and the leaves have spines.

== Flowers and fruit ==
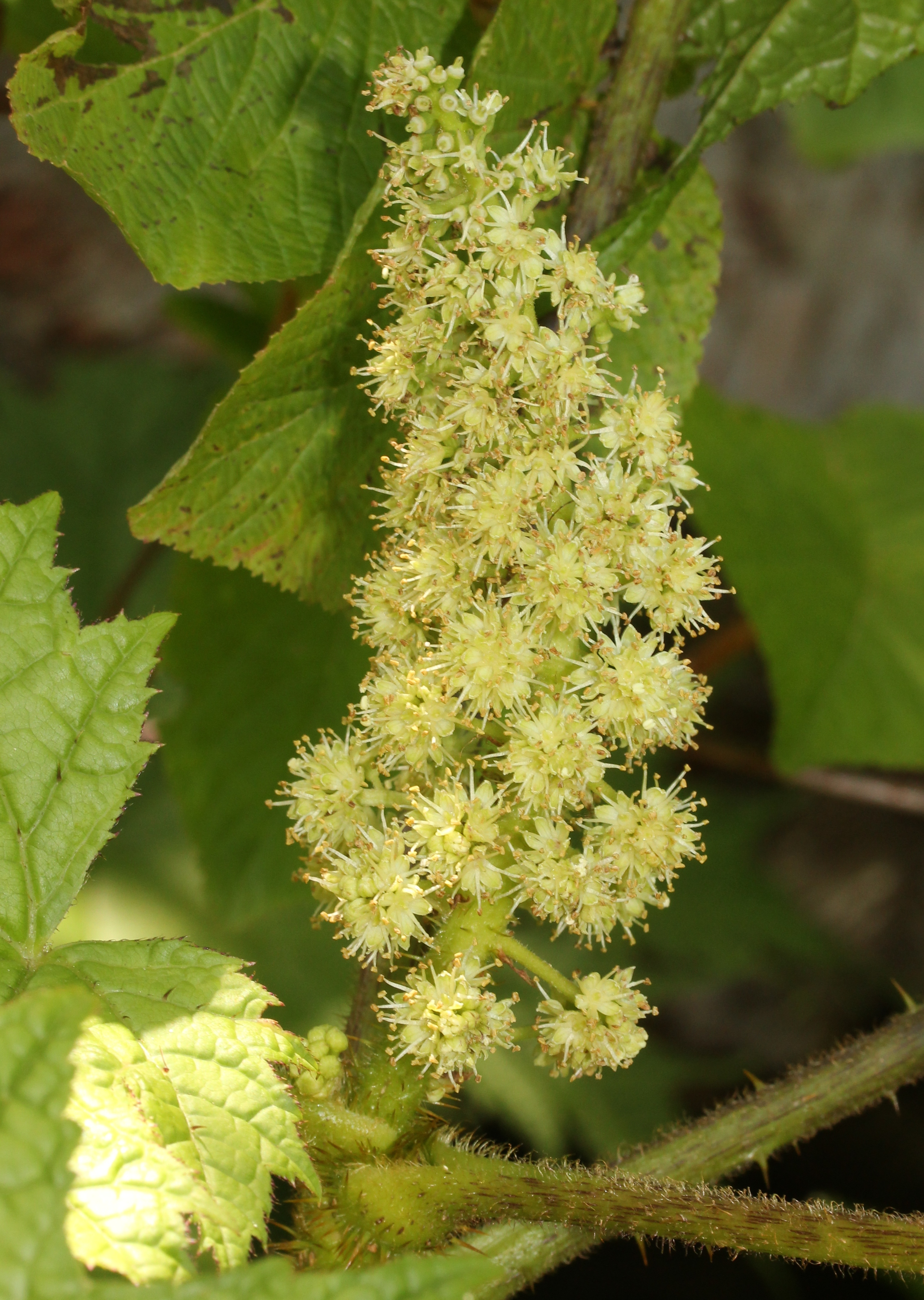
Flower of Oplopanax japonicus

Flowers of Oplopanax japonicus, is usually hermaphrodite (having both male and female organs). Inflorescence terminal, a raceme of umbels, length of 8–25 cm (3.1–9.8 in), densely covered with setae towards the base, stiffly covered with tiny hairs throughout; umbels length of 0.9–1.3 cm (0.35–0.51 in) in diameter. Usually 6–12 flower with proximal peduncles that is 2.5 cm (0.98 in) long. Calyx 5-toothed and glabrous. Styles united to middle, slender and apical. Fruit yellow-red at maturity, and sometimes globose.

=== Food ===
The leaves and roots of Oplopanax japonicas can be used as food. Young shoots have to be thoroughly peeled and cooked for eating. Roots can be cooked or chewed.

=== Herbal medicine ===
Oplopanax japonicus is used in herbal medicine. A sesquiterpene has been isolated and a synthetic derivative of the ketone form has been commercially produced in Japan to treat coughs.

== Chemical constituents ==
Chemical structure of opopanone

An example of a sesquiterpene that has been isolated and characterized is oplapanone.
