= Porfirio =

Porfirio is a given name in Portuguese and Spanish, derived from the Greek Porphyry (porphyrios "purple-clad"). It can refer to:

- Porfirio Salinas – Mexican-American artist
- Porfirio Armando Betancourt – Honduran football player
- Porfirio Barba-Jacob – Colombian poet and writer
- Porfirio Becerril – Mexican diver
- Porfirio Díaz – Mexican soldier and politician, seven times President
- Porfirio DiDonna – American artist
- Porfirio Lobo Sosa – Honduran President
- Porfirio López – Costa Rican professional soccer player
- Porfirio Muñoz Ledo – Mexican politician
- Porfirio Remigio – Mexican cyclist
- Porfirio Rubirosa – Dominican diplomat
- Hugo Porfírio – Portuguese footballer

== See also ==
- Porfirio (film), Colombian drama
- Porfirio Díaz (film), 1944 biography
- Porphyry (disambiguation)
- Porphyry (philosopher)
- Porfiry (similar Russian name)
