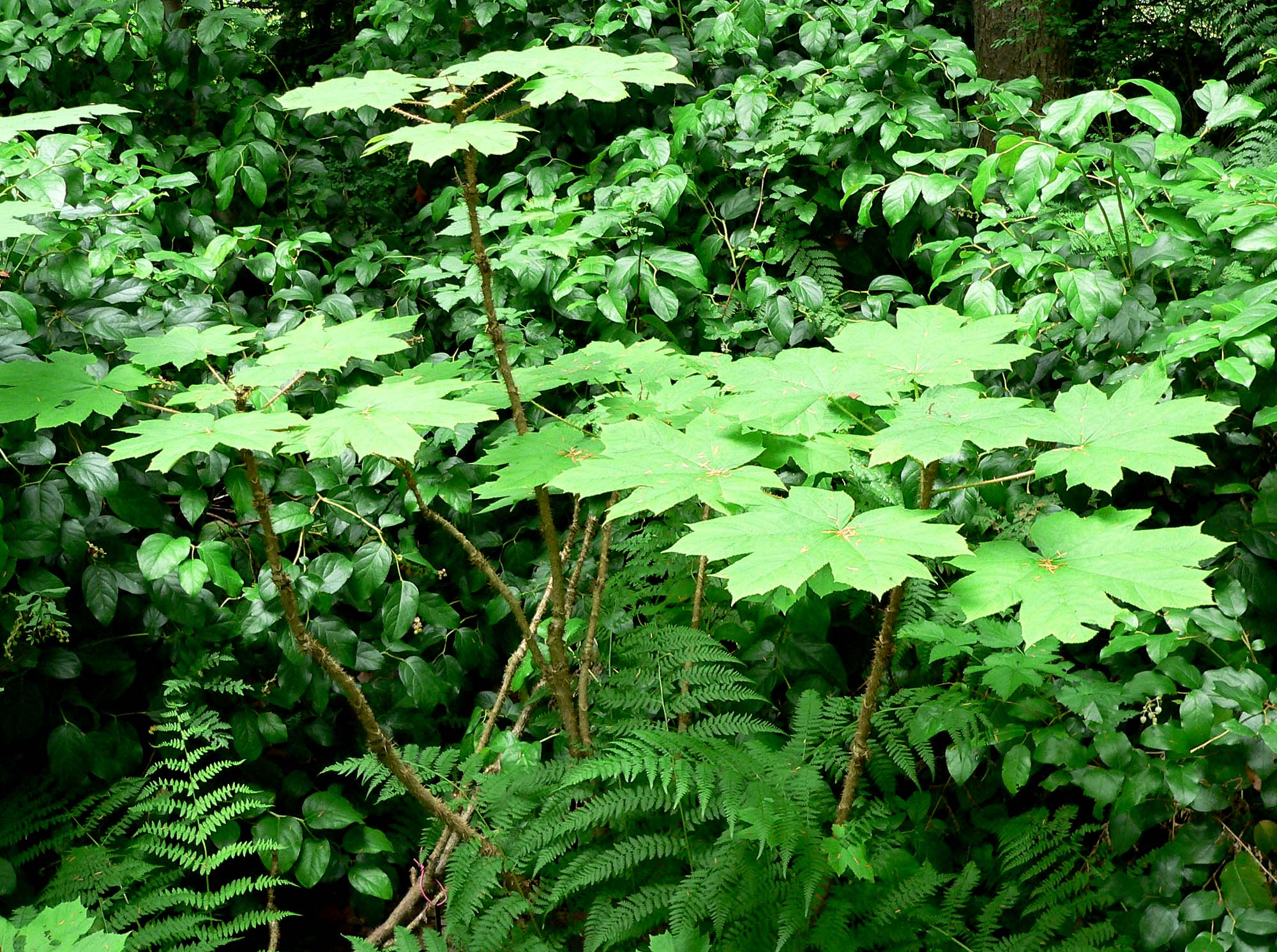
- Oplopanax horridus

Scientific classification
- Kingdom: Plantae
- Clade: Tracheophytes
- Clade: Angiosperms
- Clade: Eudicots
- Clade: Asterids
- Order: Apiales
- Family: Araliaceae
- Subfamily: Aralioideae
- Genus: Oplopanax; Miq.

Type species
- Oplopanax horridus

Species
- Oplopanax elatus; Oplopanax horridus - Devil's club; Oplopanax japonicus

= Oplopanax =

Genus of flowering plants

Oplopanax is a small genus of flowering plants in the family Araliaceae, consisting of three species of deciduous shrubs, native to western North America and northeastern Asia. Oplopanax is closely related to the Asian genus Fatsia.

== Species ==
There are three recognized species of Oplopanax in the world: Oplopanax elatus, Oplopanax horridus, Oplopanax japonicus.

Image	Name	Distribution
	Oplopanax elatus (Nakai) Nakai 1927	Korea, China, Primorye
	Oplopanax horridus (Sm.) Miq. 1863 - Devil's club	Pacific Northwest and Lake Superior.
	Oplopanax japonicus Nakai 1927	Japan

The species have spiny stems, large palmately lobed leaves, and whitish or greenish flowers occurring in terminal panicles. The fruit is a small spherical red drupe, popular with birds.

Oplopanax species are closely related to American ginseng. The plant was used in traditional Native American medicine.
