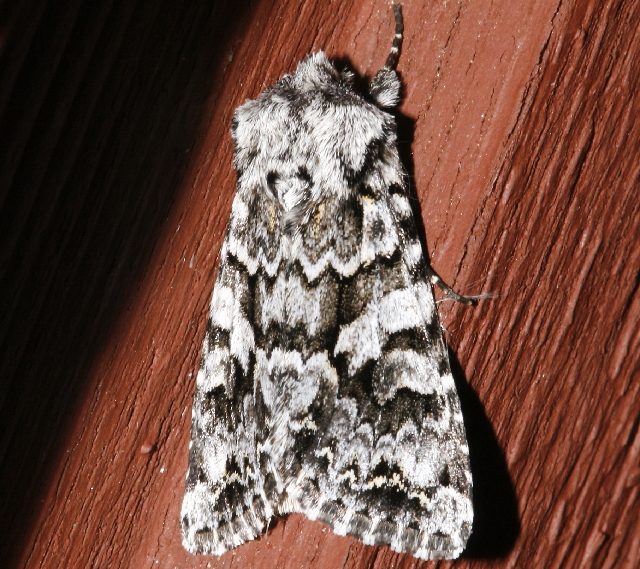

Scientific classification
- Kingdom: Animalia
- Phylum: Arthropoda
- Class: Insecta
- Order: Lepidoptera
- Superfamily: Noctuoidea
- Family: Noctuidae
- Genus: Hada
- Species: H. sutrina

Binomial name
- Hada sutrina (Grote, 1881)

= Hada sutrina =

Species of moth

Hada sutrina, the sutrina moth, is a species of cutworm or dart moth in the family Noctuidae. It is found in North America.

The MONA or Hodges number for Hada sutrina is 10324.
