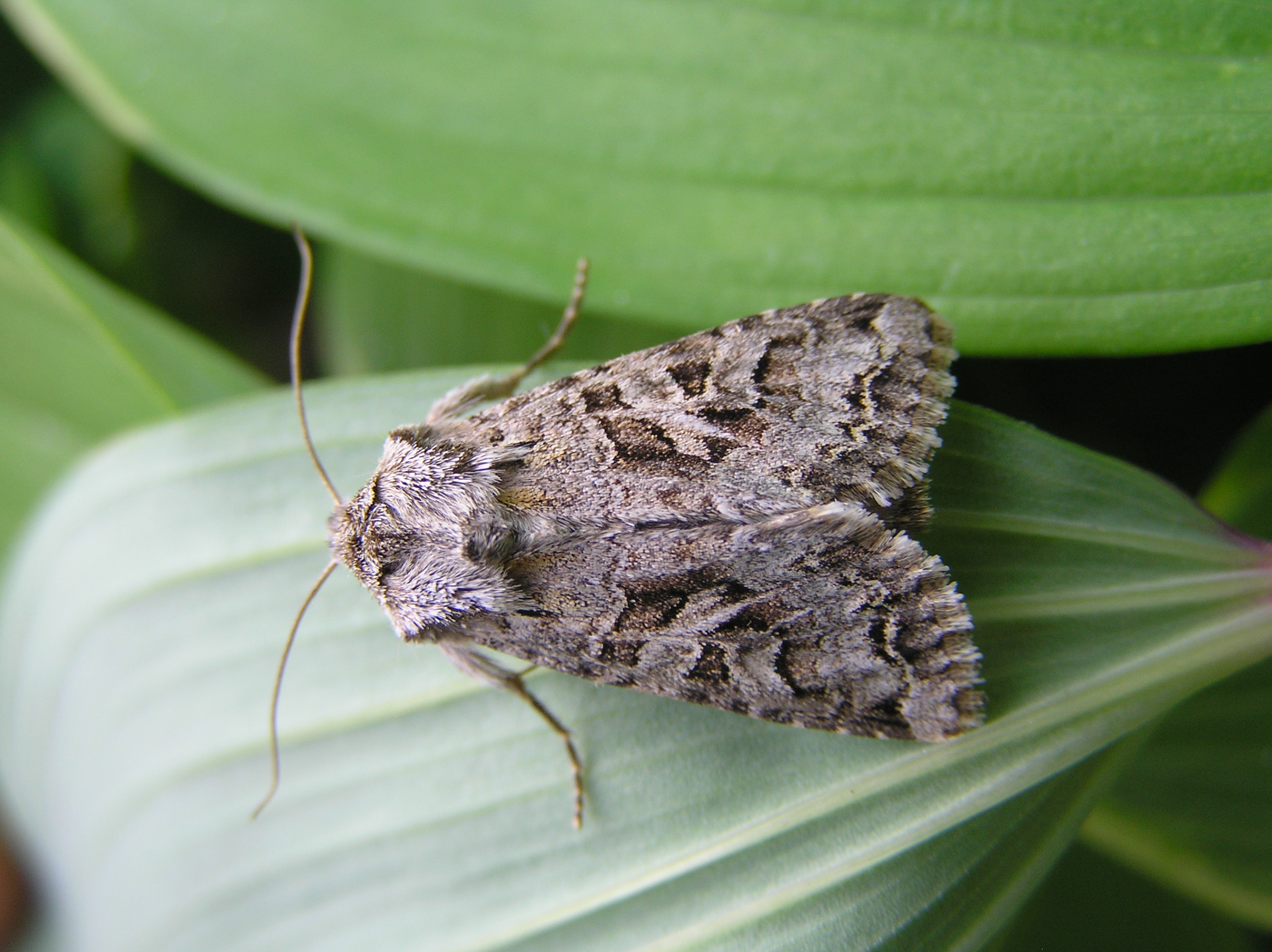

Scientific classification
- Kingdom: Animalia
- Phylum: Arthropoda
- Class: Insecta
- Order: Lepidoptera
- Superfamily: Noctuoidea
- Family: Noctuidae
- Genus: Hada
- Species: H. plebeja

Binomial name
- Hada plebeja (Linnaeus, 1761)

Synonyms
- Hada nana

= Hada plebeja =

Shears

Species of moth

Hada plebeja, the shears, is a moth of the family Noctuidae. It is found in Europe and across the Palearctic to Asia Minor, Armenia, Turkestan, Central Asia, Mongolia, Siberia, as well as Kashmir.

== Technical description and variation ==
The wingspan is 30–35 mm. The length of the forewings is 14–17 mm. Forewing lilac-grey, suffused with olive fuscous, deepest in median area; claviform stigma small, black-edged, followed by a broad bidentate pale patch at base of vein 2; orbicular and reniform pale grey with white edges; marginal area dark; submarginal line preceded by black dentate markings: veins more or less grey-scaled; hindwing fuscous, paler basewards; the fringe pale; - leucostigma Haw. has the ground colour whiter; hilaris Zett. is a form of this in which the whitish orbicular and the pale blotch on vein 2 are confluent and form one long streak; ochrea Tutt is a form, common in Britain, in which the forewing is varied with yellow scales: - latenai, Pierr. is a melanic mountain form from Switzerland and the Hebrides.

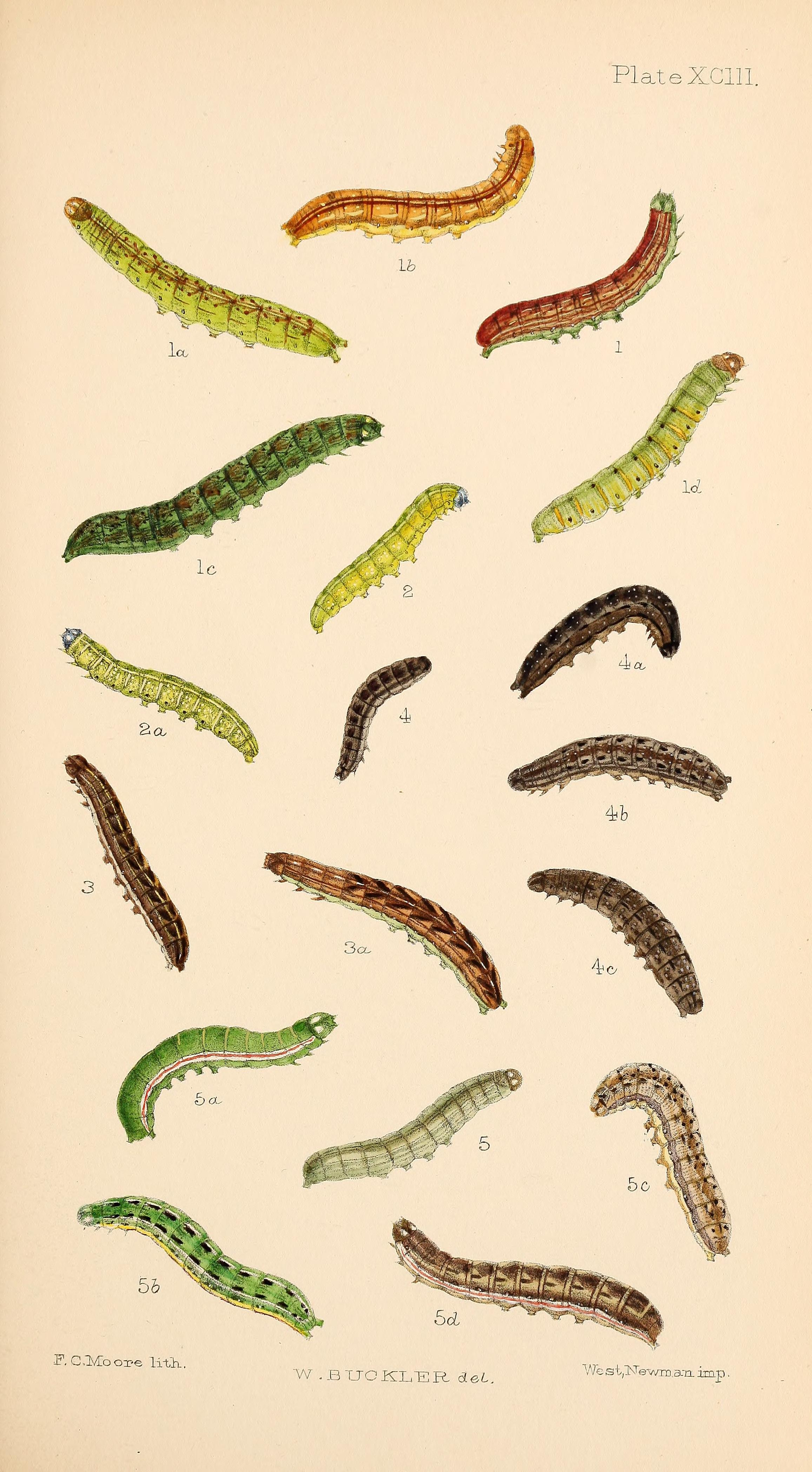
Figs.4, 4a, 4b, 4c larvae in various stages

== Biology ==
The moth flies from early June to early July. Larva dark brown; dorsal and lateral lines pale; subdorsal lines formed of dark lunular blotches: spiracles black; head glossy black. The larvae feed on smooth hawksbeard, Hieracium pilosella, Taraxacum and alfalfa. preferring the roots.
