= Porphyry Island Provincial Park =

Provincial park in Ontario, Canada

- Location within Ontario
- Location: Thunder Bay District, northwestern Ontario, Canada
- Coordinates: 48°21′04″N 88°38′07″W
- Length: 3 km (1.9 mi)
- Width: 0.5 km (0.31 mi)
- Area: 107 ha (260 acres)
- Elevation: 186 m (610 ft)
- Named for: Porphyry rock found on the island
- Website: www.ontarioparks.com/park/porphyryisland

Porphyry Island Provincial Park is a remote, non-operating protected area in Unorganized Thunder Bay District in northwestern Ontario, Canada. It is located on Porphyry Island off the tip of the Black Bay Peninsula on the North Shore of Lake Superior. The park features boreal forest, wetlands, and rocky shores with arctic species like encrusted saxifrage, insectivorous butterwort and the sedge. The island is also one of the few locations of devil's club east of the Rocky Mountains.

== Sources ==
- Map 13 (PDF) (Map). 1 : 1,600,000. Official road map of Ontario. Ministry of Transportation of Ontario. 2010-01-01.
- Restructured municipalities - Ontario map #2 (Map). Restructuring Maps of Ontario. Ontario Ministry of Municipal Affairs and Housing. 2006.
