= Hadda, Pakistan =

Village in Punjab, Pakistan

Hadda
- Village
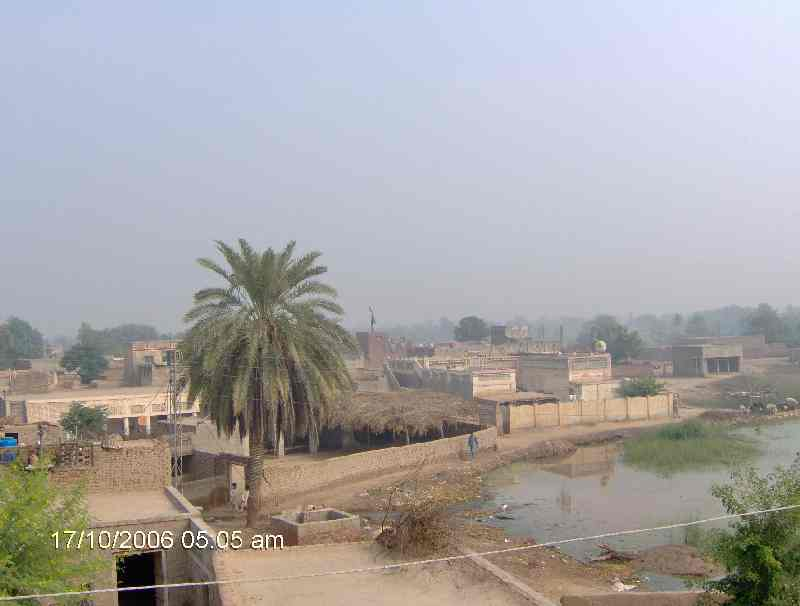

- Location in Pakistan
- Coordinates: 32°01′25″N 72°51′35″E
- Country: Pakistan
- Province: Punjab
- District: Sargodha

Hadda is a village in the Sargodha District in the Punjab province of Pakistan. It is located about 18 kilometres (11 mi) from the city of Sargodha.

== Climate ==
Hadda has a warm climate. The highest temperature they get is in June, at 43.8 degrees Celsius. Meanwhile, the coldest temperature they get is in January, at 8.4 degrees Celsius.
