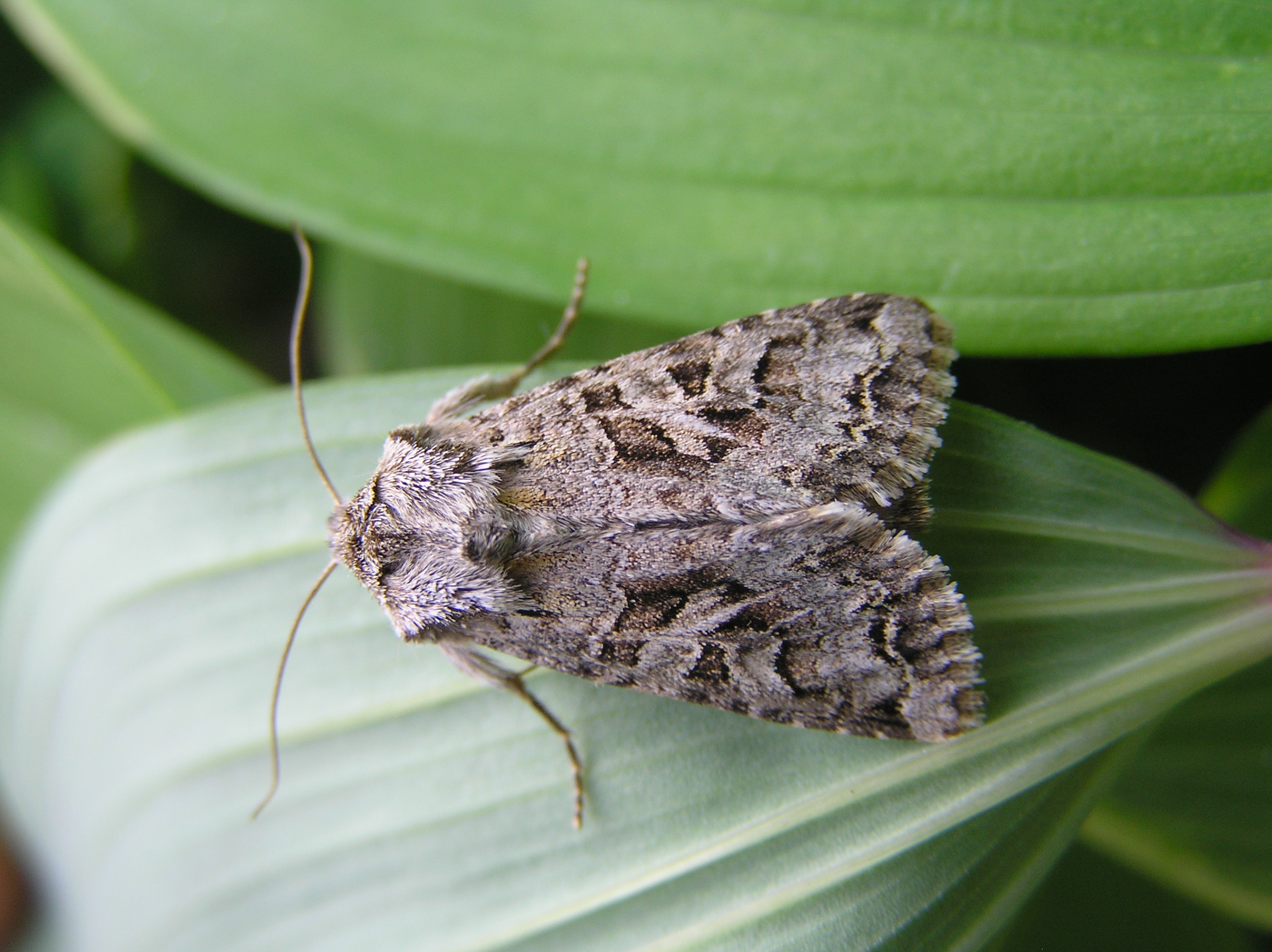

Scientific classification
- Kingdom: Animalia
- Phylum: Arthropoda
- Clade: Pancrustacea
- Class: Insecta
- Order: Lepidoptera
- Superfamily: Noctuoidea
- Family: Noctuidae
- Tribe: Hadenini
- Subtribe: Mamestrina
- Genus: Hada; Billberg, 1820

= Hada (moth) =

Genus of moths

Hada is a genus of moths of the family Noctuidae.

== Species ==
- Hada armeniaca Hacker, Huber & Kuhna, 1988
- Hada bryoptera (Püngeler, 1900)
- Hada extrita (Staudinger, 1888)
- Hada fraterna Gyulai & Ronkay, 1998
- Hada honeyi Plante, 1982
- Hada lurida (Alphéraky, 1892)
- Hada persa (Alphéraky, 1897)
- Hada plebeja (Linnaeus, 1761)
- Hada sutrina (Grote, 1881)
- Hada tenebra (Hampson, 1905)
