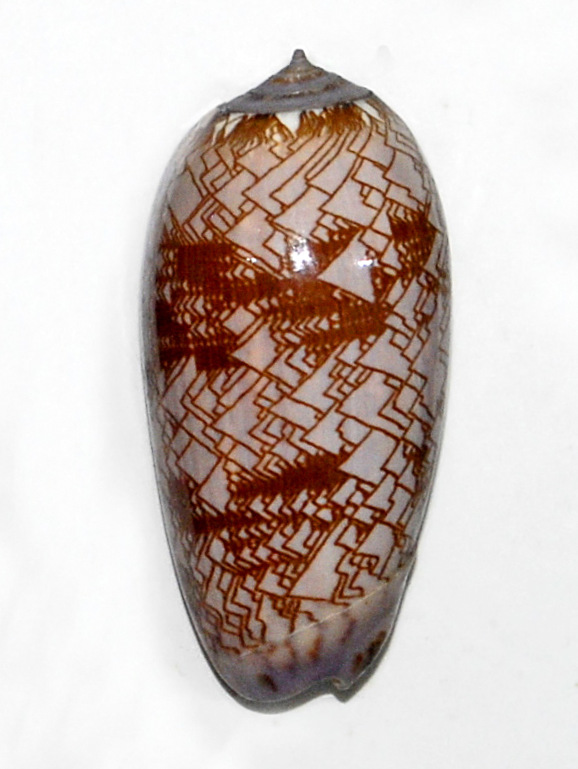
- Shell of Oliva porphyria

Scientific classification
- Kingdom: Animalia
- Phylum: Mollusca
- Class: Gastropoda
- Subclass: Caenogastropoda
- Order: Neogastropoda
- Family: Olividae
- Genus: Oliva
- Species: O. porphyria

Binomial name
- Oliva porphyria (Linnaeus, 1758)

Synonyms
- Oliva fasciata Röding, P.F., 1798; Oliva leveriana Perry, G., 1811; Oliva panamensis Montfort, P.D. de, 1810; Oliva tentorium Link, H.F., 1807; Oliva (Porphyria) porphyria (Linnaeus, 1758); Voluta porphyria Linnaeus, 1758 (original combination)

= Oliva porphyria =

Species of gastropod

Oliva porphyria, common name the tent olive, is a species of sea snail, a marine gastropod mollusk in the family Olividae, the olives. Its shell pattern has been studied as an example of a Turing pattern that can be modeled with cellular automata.

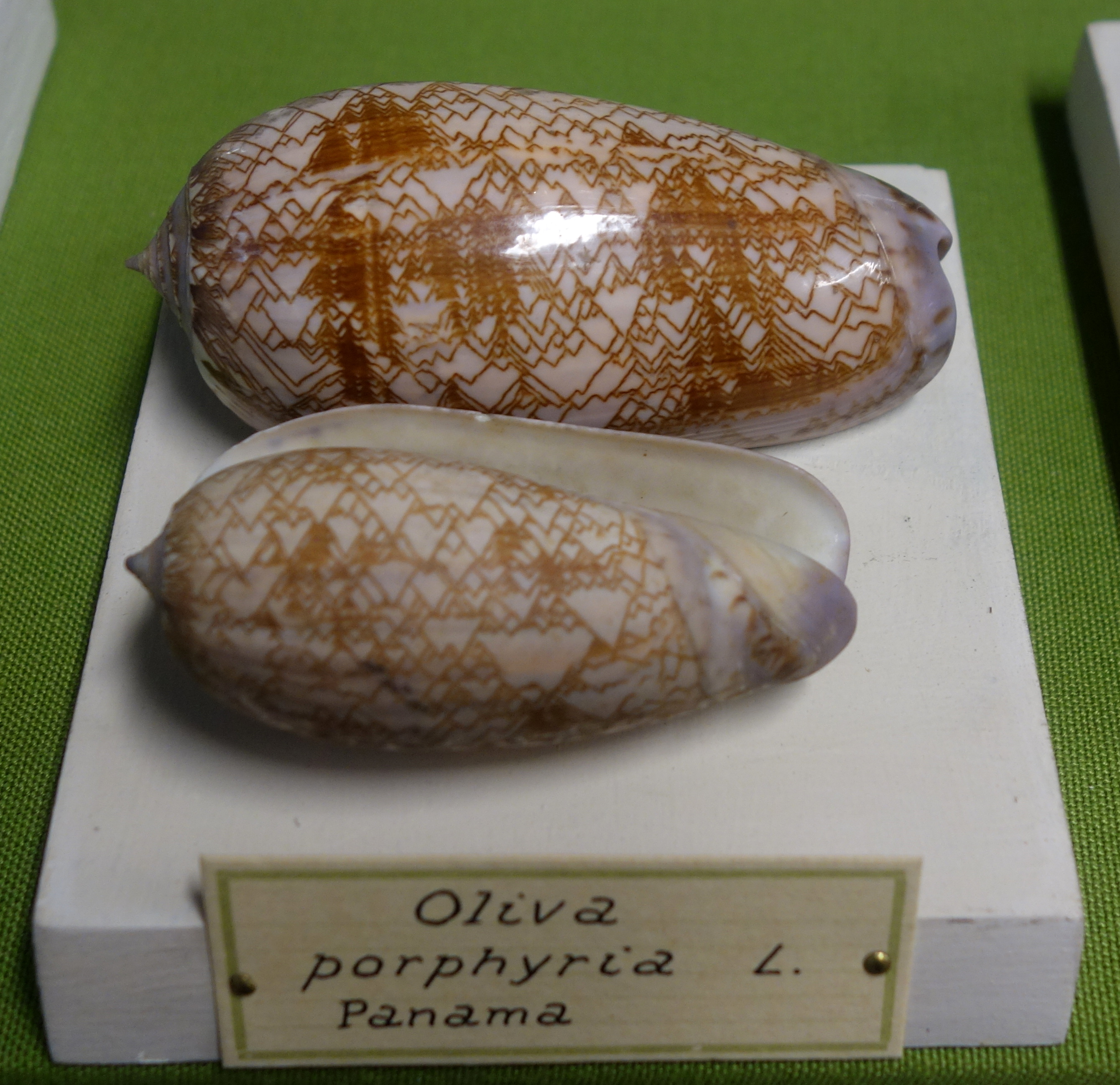
Shells of Oliva porphyria

== Subspecies ==
- Oliva porphyria erythrostoma F.C. Meuschen, 1787

== Description ==
The length of the shell can vary between 30 mm and 135 mm. The flesh-colored shell is angularly marked with some large, and many small, crowded, deep chestnut lines. The fasciole is tinged with violet, with chestnut maculations. The interior of the aperture and columella is yellowish flesh-color. Sometimes the shell is very faintly, broadly two- or three-banded with bluish ash.

== Distribution ==
This marine species occurs in the Panama Zone to Western Mexico (Gulf of California), to Northern Peru.

== Bibliography ==
- Rowland F. Zeigler - Olive Shells of the World
- Günther Sterba - Olividae - A Collector's Guide
- Edward J. Petuch, Dennis M. Sargent - Atlas of the Living Olive Shells of the World - Coastal Education & Research Foundation (U.S.)
- Bernard Tursch, Dietmar Greifeneder - Oliva shells: the genus Oliva and the species problem
- Graham Saunders - Spotters Guide to Shells
- Angeline Myra Keen - Sea Shells of Tropical West America - Stanford University Press, 1971
- Jerome M. Eisenberg - Collector's guide to Seashells of the World
- A. Robin - Encyclopedia of Marine Gastropods
- H. P. Oliver - Hamlyn Guide to Shells of the World
- R. Tucker Abbott and S. Peter Dance - Compendium of Seashells
- S. Peter Dance - Eyewitness handbooks - Shells
