= Haida Islands =

Island group in British Columbia, Canada

Coordinates: 52°03′00″N 128°19′00″W

The Haida Islands are a small archipelago on the Central Coast of British Columbia, Canada, south of Stryker Island and near the community of Bella Bella.

They should not be confused with the Haida Gwaii, which translates as "Haida islands" and which are commonly referred to as such.
