= Porphyry Island =

Island in Ontario, Canada

- Location within Ontario

Geography
- Location: Lake Superior
- Coordinates: 48°21′02″N 88°38′09″W
- Area: 107 ha (260 acres)
- Length: 3 km (1.9 mi)
- Width: 0.5 km (0.31 mi)

Administration
- Canada
- Province: Ontario
- District: Thunder Bay

Demographics
- Population: uninhabited nature reserve

Porphyry Island is an island in Unorganized Thunder Bay District in northwestern Ontario, Canada. It is the last island in a chain stretching south west of the Black Bay Peninsula in Lake Superior. It is located about 6 kilometres (4 mi) from Edward Island Provincial Park, 13 kilometres (8 mi) from Sleeping Giant Provincial Park, 14 kilometres (9 mi) east of Silver Islet, Ontario, and 42 kilometres (26 mi) east of the city of Thunder Bay.

The island and nature reserve take their name from the characteristic quartz and feldspar crystals, or porphyries found in the volcanic rocks.

The entire 107-hectare (264-acre) island constitutes the Porphyry Island Provincial Park or nature reserve.

== Point Porphyry Lighthouse ==
The federal government established a lighthouse at Point Porphyry in 1873. This is located at the southwestern tip of the island.

== Sources ==
- Map 13 (PDF) (Map). 1 : 1,600,000. Official road map of Ontario. Ministry of Transportation of Ontario. 2010-01-01.
- Restructured municipalities - Ontario map #2 (Map). Restructuring Maps of Ontario. Ontario Ministry of Municipal Affairs and Housing. 2006.
