= Hyderabad Airport Development Authority =

- HADA

Agency overview
- Formed: 1996
- Preceding agency: Hyderabad Urban Development Authority

Hyderabad Airport Development Authority or HADA is an organisation which looks into development around the Rajiv Gandhi International Airport, Hyderabad. The Government of Andhra Pradesh constituted this agency to look into the master plan for the airport development area.
