= Hada (surname) =

Hada (written: 波田, 羽田 or 秦) is a surname. Notable people with the surname include:

- Akira Hada (波田 晃) or Yoku Hata (波田 陽区) (born 1975), Japanese stand up comedian
- Keisuke Hada (羽田 敬介, born 1982), retired Japanese footballer
- Kenji Hada (秦 賢二, born 1981), Japanese professional footballer
- Michiko Hada (羽田 美智子, born 1968), Japanese actress
- Shail Hada (born 1975), Indian singer
