= Black Bay Peninsula =

Peninsula in Ontario, Canada

- Peninsula
- Location within Ontario
- Coordinates: 48°38′08″N 88°16′44″W
- Location: Thunder Bay, Unorganized, Ontario

Dimensions
  - Length: 55 km (34 mi)
  - Width: 25 km (16 mi)
- Topo map: NTS 52A9 Shesheeb Bay

Black Bay Peninsula is a volcanic peninsula in Unorganized Thunder Bay District in Northwestern Ontario, Canada, located on the North Shore of Lake Superior. It separates Black Bay and Nipigon Bay and consists of over 300 flood basalt lava flows. Porphyry Island, an island entirely encompassed within Porphyry Island Provincial Park, lies off the tip of the peninsula. A 49-square-kilometre (19 sq mi) portion of the peninsula has been set aside as the Black Bay Peninsula Enhanced Management Area.
