= Samuel Haida =

Bohemian Kabbalistic author

Samuel ben Moses Haida (Hebrew: שמואל בן משה היידא; 1626 – 1 June 1685) was a Bohemian Kabbalistic author. He was dayyan and preacher in Prague, which was probably his native city.

He edited the Tanna debe Eliyahu Rabbah with two commentaries and copious references (Prague, 1676); but he changed the text arbitrarily, considering himself to be under the inspiration of the prophet Elijah, whom he believed to be the author of this work of an unknown writer in the 10th century. In order to receive this inspiration he fasted, visited the graves of pious men, and engaged in different mystic practises. He justifies pilpulistic methods, and finds even for the habit of gesticulations at Talmudic disputations a basis in Biblical and Talmudic literature, for which he is severely criticized by Yair Ḥayyim Bacharach.
