= List of secondary highways in Parry Sound District =

List of Ontario secondary highways

This is a list of secondary highways in Parry Sound District, many of which provide access to isolated settlements and recreational properties within the Parry Sound District of Ontario.

== Highway 510 ==
Highway 510

Route information
- Maintained by the Ministry of Transportation of Ontario
- Length: 2.8 km (1.7 mi)

Major junctions
- South end: Highway 520 in Magnetawan
- North end: Highway 124 – Parry Sound, Sundridge

Location
- Country: Canada
- Province: Ontario
- Districts: Parry Sound

Highway system
- Ontario provincial highways; Current; Former; 400-series
← Highway 505	→ Highway 516

Secondary Highway 510, commonly referred to as Highway 510, is a provincially maintained highway in the Canadian province of Ontario. The highway is 2.8 kilometres (1.7 mi) in length, connecting Highway 520 in Magnetawan with Highway 124.

== Highway 518 ==
Highway 518

Route information
- Maintained by the Ministry of Transportation of Ontario
- Length: 72.7 km (45.2 mi)
- Existed: 1956–present

Major junctions
- West end: Highway 400 – Parry Sound
- East end: Kearney

Location
- Country: Canada
- Province: Ontario
- Districts: Parry Sound
- Major cities: Orrville, Bear Lake, Sprucedale, Emsdale

Highway system
- Ontario provincial highways; Current; Former; 400-series
← Highway 516	→ Highway 519

Secondary Highway 518, commonly referred to as Highway 518, is a provincially maintained secondary highway in the Canadian province of Ontario. Highway 518 spans 72.7 kilometres (45.2 mi) between Parry Sound and Kearney. It serves as one of the many links between Highway 400 and Highway 11. The highway was assumed in 1956, and has remained generally unchanged since, aside from being truncated slightly at both ends.

== Highway 520 ==
Highway 520

Route information
- Maintained by the Ministry of Transportation of Ontario
- Length: 68 km (42 mi)

Major junctions
- West end: Ardbeg CN station
- Highway 124; Highway 510 – Magnetawan
- East end: Highway 11 – Burk's Falls

Location
- Country: Canada
- Province: Ontario
- Districts: Parry Sound

Highway system
- Ontario provincial highways; Current; Former; 400-series
← Highway 519	→ Highway 522

Secondary Highway 520, commonly referred to as Highway 520, is a provincially maintained highway in the Canadian province of Ontario. The highway is 68 kilometres (42 mi) in length, connecting several small communities in Parry Sound District with Highway 124 and Highway 11.

The highway links several remote First Nation hamlets to the major highway routes of the region. However, the only places of noteworthy size are the village of Magnetawan and the town of Burk's Falls. It is concurrent with Highway 124 for 15.4 kilometres (9.6 mi).

== Highway 522 ==
Highway 522

Route information
- Maintained by the Ministry of Transportation of Ontario
- Length: 109.6 km (68.1 mi)

Major junctions
- West end: Highway 69 – Cranberry
- East end: Highway 11 – Powassan

Location
- Country: Canada
- Province: Ontario
- Districts: Parry Sound

Highway system
- Ontario provincial highways; Current; Former; 400-series
← Highway 520	→ Highway 522B

Secondary Highway 522, commonly referred to as Highway 522, is a provincially maintained highway in the Canadian province of Ontario. The highway is 109.6 kilometres (68.1 mi) in length, connecting Highway 69 near Cranberry with Highway 11 in Powassan. Highway 522 serves as the only link between these two routes south of Highway 17 and north of Highway 124. It is often used to access Grundy Lake Provincial Park, a popular camping area for northbound travellers.

== Highway 522B ==
Highway 522B

Route information
- Maintained by the Ministry of Transportation of Ontario
- Length: 1.9 km (1.2 mi)
- Existed: October 2002–present

Major junctions
- South end: Highway 522
- Highway 11 – North Bay
- North end: Hemlock Road (continues north as McCarthy Street)

Location
- Country: Canada
- Province: Ontario
- Districts: Parry Sound

Highway system
- Ontario provincial highways; Current; Former; 400-series
← Highway 522	→ Highway 523

Secondary Highway 522B, commonly referred to as Highway 522B, is a provincially maintained highway in the Canadian province of Ontario. The highway is 1.9 kilometres (1.2 mi) in length, connecting Highway 522 within Trout Creek with Highway 11 to the north. The highway was created in late 2002 when the Trout Creek Bypass of Highway 11 opened; Highway 522B forms a portion of the former routing.

== Highway 524 ==
Highway 524

Route information
- Maintained by the Ministry of Transportation of Ontario
- Length: 4.6 km (2.9 mi)
- Existed: 1956–present

Major junctions
- South end: Highway 522 at Farley's Corners.
- North end: Highway 534 near Restoule

Location
- Country: Canada
- Province: Ontario
- Districts: Parry Sound

Highway system
- Ontario provincial highways; Current; Former; 400-series
← Highway 523	→ Highway 525

Secondary Highway 524, commonly referred to as Highway 524, is a provincially maintained highway in the Canadian province of Ontario. The highway is 4.6 kilometres (2.9 mi) in length, connecting Highway 520 at Farley's Corners with Highway 534, which leads to Restoule.

== Highway 526 ==
Highway 526

Route information
- Maintained by the Ministry of Transportation of Ontario
- Length: 3.9 km (2.4 mi)
- Existed: 1956–present

Major junctions
- West end: Britt post office
- East end: Highway 69

Location
- Country: Canada
- Province: Ontario
- Districts: Parry Sound
- Villages: Britt

Highway system
- Ontario provincial highways; Current; Former; 400-series
← Highway 525	→ Highway 527

Secondary Highway 526, commonly referred to as Highway 526, is a provincially maintained secondary highway in the Canadian province of Ontario. It is a short and lightly travelled route that connects Highway 69 with the community of Britt.

== Highway 529 ==
Highway 529

Route information
- Maintained by the Ministry of Transportation of Ontario
- Length: 25.8 km (16.0 mi)

Major junctions
- South end: Highway 69 near Pointe au Baril
- North end: Highway 69 at Magnetawan River

Location
- Country: Canada
- Province: Ontario
- Districts: Parry Sound
- Major cities: Manbert, Naiscoot, Naiscoutaing

Highway system
- Ontario provincial highways; Current; Former; 400-series
← Highway 528	→ Highway 529A

Secondary Highway 529, commonly referred to as Highway 529, is a secondary highway in the Canadian province of Ontario. Located within Parry Sound District, the highway follows a 25.8-kilometre (16.0 mi) route, from its southern terminus at Highway 69 near Pointe au Baril to its northern terminus at Highway 69's crossing of the Magnetawan River near Byng Inlet.

== Highway 529A ==
Highway 529A

Route information
- Maintained by the Ministry of Transportation of Ontario
- Length: 4.5 km (2.8 mi)
- Existed: 1961–present

Major junctions
- West end: Bayfield Lodge
- East end: Highway 529 at Manbert

Location
- Country: Canada
- Province: Ontario
- Districts: Parry Sound
- Villages: Bayfield Inlet, Manbert

Highway system
- Ontario provincial highways; Current; Former; 400-series
← Highway 529	→ Highway 531

Secondary Highway 529A, commonly referred to as Highway 529A, is a provincially maintained secondary highway in the Canadian province of Ontario. Located within Parry Sound District, the highway is a short spur of Highway 529, extending from Manbert to Bayfield Inlet.

== Highway 559 ==
Highway 559

Route information
- Maintained by Ministry of Transportation of Ontario
- Length: 18.2 km (11.3 mi)

Major junctions
- Southwest end: Blind Bay Road at Killbear Provincial Park
- Northeast end: Highway 400 at Nobel

Location
- Country: Canada
- Province: Ontario
- Districts: Parry Sound
- Major cities: Carling

Highway system
- Ontario provincial highways; Current; Former; 400-series
← Highway 558	→ Highway 560

Secondary Highway 559, commonly referred to as Highway 559, is a secondary highway in the Canadian province of Ontario, located within the township of Carling in Parry Sound District. The 18.2-kilometre (11.3 mi) highway extends from the entrance to Killbear Provincial Park, near the shores of Georgian Bay, to an interchange with Highway 400 (Exit 247) north of Nobel.

The highway serves as an access road to most of the communities in Carling Township, as well as the current northern terminus of Highway 400 as of 2010.

== Highway 592 ==
Highway 592

Route information
- Maintained by Ministry of Transportation of Ontario
- Length: 16.4 km (10.2 mi)
- Existed: March 23, 1961–present

Major junctions
- South end: Highway 11 (Exit 235) at Novar
- Highway 518 in Emsdale
- North end: Katrine Road (Highway 7188 near Katrine

Location
- Country: Canada
- Province: Ontario
- Districts: Parry Sound District
- Towns: Novar, Emsdale

Highway system
- Ontario provincial highways; Current; Former; 400-series
← Highway 591	→ Highway 593

Secondary Highway 592, commonly referred to as Highway 592, is a secondary highway in the Canadian province of Ontario. Located in the Parry Sound District, the highway provides access to Novar, Emsdale, and others. It is the former routing of Highway 11 between Novar and Katrine. Highway 592 was assumed by the Department of Highways, predecessor to the modern Ministry of Transportation, on March 23, 1961.

== Highway 612 ==
Highway 612

Route information
- Maintained by the Ministry of Transportation of Ontario
- Length: 4.4 km (2.7 mi)
- Existed: October 20, 1960–present

Major junctions
- South end: Parry Sound – Muskoka boundary
- North end: Lake Joseph Road (Highway 7289) at Gordon Bay

Location
- Country: Canada
- Province: Ontario
- Divisions: Parry Sound
- Major cities: Seguin

Highway system
- Ontario provincial highways; Current; Former; 400-series
← Highway 611	→ Highway 613

Highway 612 at Highway 69

Secondary Highway 612, commonly referred to as Highway 612, is a secondary highway in the Canadian province of Ontario. Located in the Parry Sound District, the highway extends for 4.4 kilometres (2.7 mi) from a junction with Lake Joseph Road, the former route of Highway 69, outside of Gordon Bay to the boundary of Parry Sound District with the regional municipality of Muskoka near a junction with Healey Lake Road.

At the boundary, the roadway continues southward as Muskoka Road 11 through MacTier. Prior to 1997, this county road was also part of Highway 612.

A previous iteration of Highway 612 existed in Algoma District between 1956 and 1958, which was renumbered as Highway 108 in late 1957 and 1958.

== Highway 632 ==
Highway 632

Route information
- Maintained by the Ministry of Transportation of Ontario
- Length: 10.7 km (6.6 mi)
- Existed: July 20, 1961–present

Major junctions
- South end: Parry Sound/Muskoka boundary
- North end: Highway 141 in Rosseau

Location
- Country: Canada
- Province: Ontario
- Districts: Parry Sound
- Major cities: Seguin

Highway system
- Ontario provincial highways; Current; Former; 400-series
← Highway 631	→ Highway 633

Secondary Highway 632, commonly referred to as Highway 632, is a secondary highway in the Canadian province of Ontario, located in Parry Sound District. The highway extends for 10.7 kilometres (6.6 mi) from a junction with Highway 141 in Rosseau to the boundary between Parry Sound District and the Muskoka. At the boundary, the roadway continues southward as Muskoka Road 7 through the communities of Minett, Gregory and Port Sandfield. Prior to 1997, this county road was also part of Highway 632.

Highway 632 was first assumed by the Department of Highways, predecessor to the modern Ministry of Transportation, in Parry Sound District on July 20, 1961 at a length of 10.5 kilometres (6.5 mi). One week later, on July 29, another 16.1 kilometres (10.0 mi) within what was then just Muskoka District was assumed as part of the highway.

When the District Municipality of Muskoka was created in 1971, secondary highways within its boundaries were transferred to Muskoka and redesignated as part of its county road network.

== Highway 644 ==

Secondary Highway 644 commonly referred to as Highway 644, was a secondary highway in the Canadian province of Ontario. It is a very minor and extremely short route, and previously held the distinction of being Ontario's shortest posted highway at only 800 metres (1/2 mile) in length. On April 19th, 2006, since the highway served an exclusively local purpose, the route was transferred to the Township of the Archipelago. The road is now known as South Shore Road.

It is located in Pointe au Baril in Parry Sound District and simply acts as an access road to the community from Highway 69.

== Highway 645 ==
Highway 645

Route information
- Maintained by Ministry of Transportation of Ontario
- Length: 4.0 km (2.5 mi)
- Existed: April 1, 1964–present

Major junctions
- West end: Tramway Avenue at Byng Inlet
- East end: Highway 529 near Magnetawan First Nation

Location
- Country: Canada
- Province: Ontario
- Districts: Parry Sound

Highway system
- Ontario provincial highways; Current; Former; 400-series
← Highway 643	→ Highway 647
Former provincial highways
← Highway 644	Highway 646 →

Secondary Highway 645, commonly referred to as Highway 645, is a secondary highway in the Canadian province of Ontario. Located within Parry Sound District, the highway extends for 4.0 kilometres (2.5 mi) from Highway 529 to the community of Byng Inlet. The route was established on April 1, 1964, and has remained unchanged since then.

== Highway 654 ==
Highway 654

Route information
- Maintained by the Ministry of Transportation of Ontario
- Length: 22.9 km (14.2 mi)
- Existed: August 26, 1964–present

Major junctions
- South end: Highway 534 near Nipissing, Ontario
- Highway 94
- East end: Highway 11 at Callander

Location
- Country: Canada
- Province: Ontario
- Districts: Parry Sound

Highway system
- Ontario provincial highways; Current; Former; 400-series
← Highway 653	→ Highway 655

Secondary Highway 654, commonly referred to as Highway 654, is a secondary highway in the Canadian province of Ontario. The highway is 22.9 kilometres (14.2 mi) in length, connecting Highway 534 south of Nipissing with Highway 11 in Callander. The route was designated through North Himsworth on August 26, 1964, and through Nipissing on August 28, and has remained unchanged since then, aside from a short extension to the Highway 11 Callander Bypass. It is sparsely travelled, but paved throughout its length.
