= Ontario Highway 400 =

Controlled-access highway in Ontario

Highway 400
- Toronto–Barrie Highway
- Highway 400 highlighted in red

Route information
- Maintained by Ministry of Transportation of Ontario
- Length: 226.0 km (140.4 mi)
- History: Opened December 1, 1951 – July 1, 1952

Major junctions
- South end: Maple Leaf Drive – Toronto (continues as Black Creek Drive)
- Highway 401 – Toronto; 407 ETR – Vaughan; Highway 11 – Barrie; Highway 12 – Waubaushene; Highway 124 – Parry Sound
- North end: Highway 69 – Carling

Location
- Country: Canada
- Province: Ontario
- Divisions: York Region, Simcoe County, Muskoka, Parry Sound District, Sudbury District (future)
- Major cities: Toronto; Vaughan; Barrie; Sudbury (future)
- Towns: Parry Sound, Bradford, King

Highway system
- Ontario provincial highways; Current; Former; 400-series
← Highway 148	→ Highway 401
Former provincial highways
← Highway 169	Highway 400A →

King's Highway 400, commonly referred to as Highway 400, historically as the Toronto–Barrie Highway, and colloquially as the four hundred, is a 400-series highway in the Canadian province of Ontario linking the city of Toronto in the urban and agricultural south of the province with Parry Sound District in the scenic and sparsely populated central and northern regions. The portion of Highway 400 between Toronto (Highway 401) and Lake Simcoe roughly traces the route of the Toronto Carrying-Place Trail, a historic trail between the Lower and Upper Great Lakes. The full route of Highway 400 is part of the broader National Highway System. North of Highway 12, in combination with Highway 69, it forms a branch of the Trans-Canada Highway (TCH), the Georgian Bay Route, and is part of the highest-capacity route from southern Ontario to the Canadian West, via a connection with the mainline TCH (which connects to Winnipeg, Manitoba and Montreal, Quebec) in Sudbury. The highway also serves as the primary route from Toronto to southern Georgian Bay and Muskoka, areas collectively known as cottage country.

It was the first fully controlled-access highway (freeway) in Ontario when it was opened between North York and Barrie on July 1, 1952. On that date, it was also the first route to be designated as a 400-series highway. The freeway was extended in both directions; north of Barrie to Coldwater in 1958, and south of Highway 401 to Jane Street in 1966; thereafter the route continues as the municipal expressway, Black Creek Drive, which opened in 1982. Since the 1970s to the present, there have been numerous projects which have widened and modernized the freeway between North York and Barrie, including being expanded with a collector-express system in Vaughan to accommodate the stack interchange with the new Highway 407 Express Toll Route (ETR).

Highway 400 is the second longest freeway in the province, the trans-provincial Highway 401 being the longest. Since 1977, construction on the freeway has been snaking north along Highway 69 towards Parry Sound and Sudbury. As of 2011, a four lane freeway is opened as far north as Carling; at that point, the four lanes narrow into two and continue northerly to Sudbury as Highway 69. At the north end of Highway 69, a segment of freeway is in operation from near Highway 522 south of the French River to Sudbury; while this section will be part of the completed Highway 400 route, at present it remains signed as Highway 69. The remaining gap between Carling and Highway 522 will be opened in stages as construction is undertaken and completed.

The speed limit is 110 km/h (68 mph), except south of Highway 401, where the speed limit is 80 km/h (50 mph). The route is patrolled by the Ontario Provincial Police (OPP) and maintained by the Ministry of Transportation of Ontario (MTO).

== Route description ==
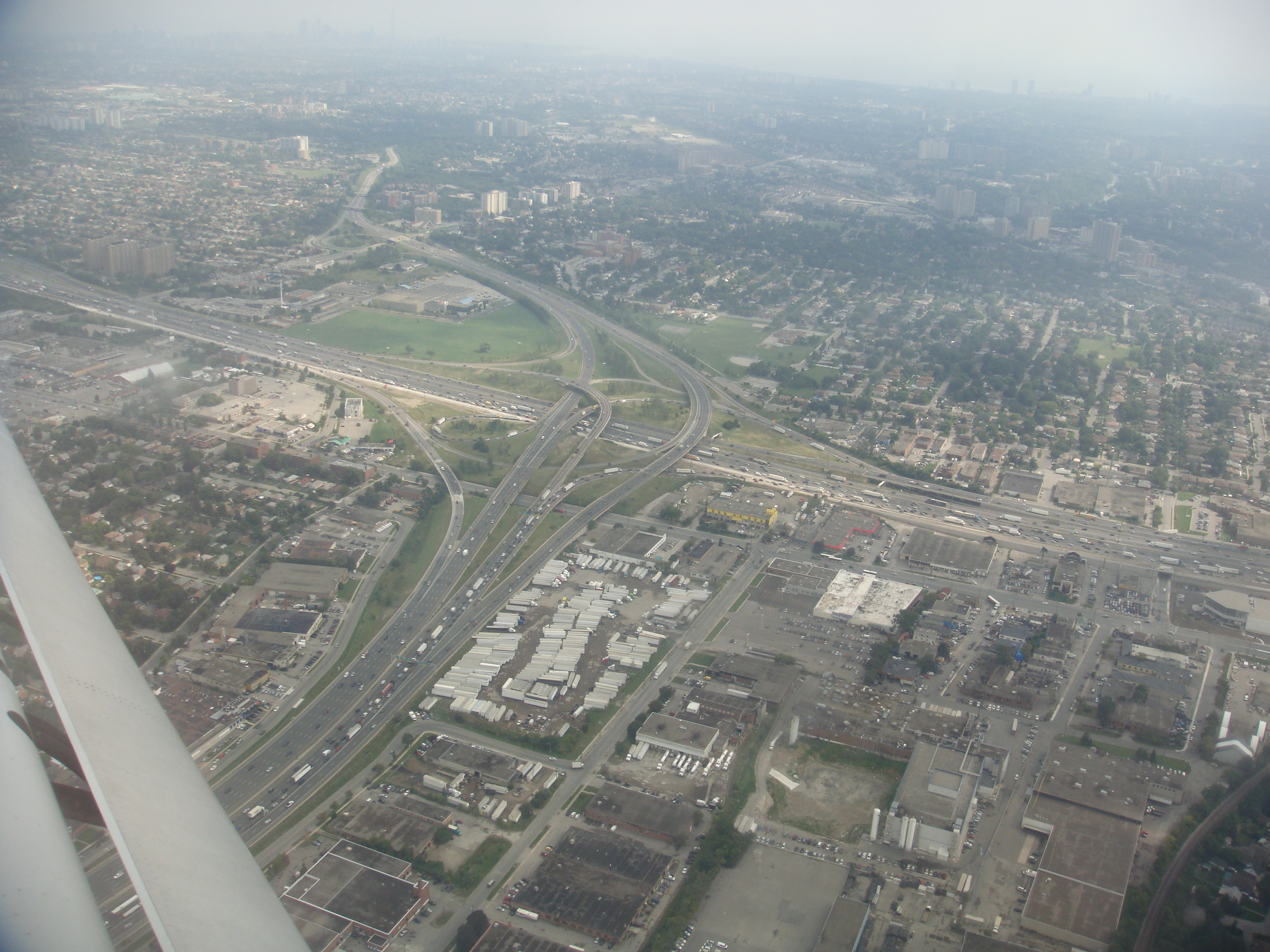
Interchange of Highway 400 and 401, looking towards the south. The exit ramp to Highway 401 westbound is often congested.

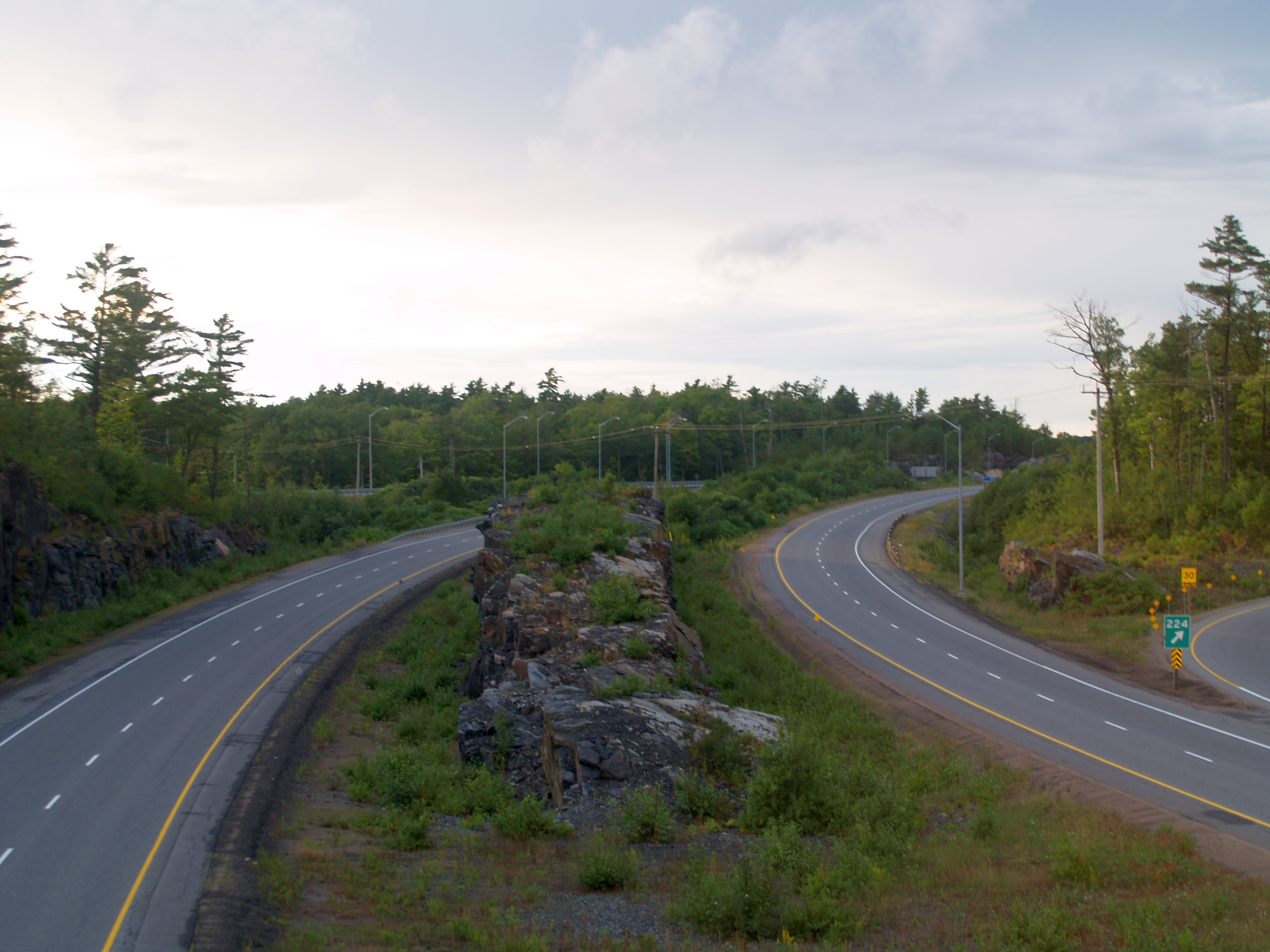
North of Port Severn, Highway 400 frequently passes through large granite rock cuts; portions of the median also feature outcroppings

While Highway 400 was originally known as the "Toronto–Barrie Highway", the route has been extended well beyond Barrie to north of Parry Sound, and is projected to reach its eventual terminus in Sudbury in the 2020s. As of 2012, the length of the highway is 226.0 km (140.4 mi), with an additional 152-kilometre (94 mi) section planned.

Highway 400 begins at the Maple Leaf Drive overpass in Toronto, south of Highway 401. South of that, the route continues as the municipal Black Creek Drive, an arterial road or limited controlled-access expressway with at-grade intersections, originally planned as a southern extension of the highway. Alongside the expansion of Highway 401, Highway 400 had been completed to Jane Street in 1966, but a proposed southern extension of the freeway to the Gardiner Expressway faced opposition that also caused the truncation of Allen Road, so it was instead built as the scaled-back Black Creek Drive which opened in 1982 as a four-lane expressway with at-grade intersections. South of Highway 401, all on-ramps to the southbound lanes of Highway 400 are signed as Black Creek Drive (without reference to Highway 400), even though Black Creek Drive does not start until Maple Leaf Drive.

North of Maple Leaf Drive, the highway shifts northwestward as it meets Jane Street at a five-ramp parclo interchange, with the Black Creek snaking under the highway and on/off ramps. The segment between Maple Leaf Drive and Jane Street, including the bridges crossing Black Creek and the ramps to/from Jane Street, were built during the Black Creek Drive project although it is under provincial jurisdiction. The highway then turns approximately northward as it approaches the interchange with Highway 401, and although only two lanes per direction pass through that junction, the on-ramps from Highway 401 become additional lanes for the highway's northbound carriageway widening the cross-section to twelve lanes. The opposite occurs on the southbound carriageway of the highway where four lanes default to off-ramps for Highway 401 eastbound and westbound, while the rightmost lanes continue the highway through that junction (signed as Black Creek Dr. and Jane St.). The on-ramp from Highway 401 eastbound to Highway 400 northbound has rumble strips to encourage drivers to adhere to the recommended speed limit of 50 km/h.

The highway continues north, losing two lanes at the Parclo A4 interchange with Finch Avenue. Crossing Steeles Avenue and the CN Halton Subdivision and exiting Toronto as it enters Vaughan and the Regional Municipality of York, the freeway has a junction with Highway 407, which is the only four-level stack interchange in the Greater Toronto Area; unusually the entry/exit for Highway 407 are before those for Steeles Avenue even though Steeles is further south; as the semi-directional ramps connecting from/to Highway 407 require a longer approach due to the height of the junction. The section between Highway 407 and Langstaff Road in suburban Vaughan features a short collector-express system, with the collector lanes serving interchanges with Highway 7 and Langstaff Road, while the express lanes have access to Highway 407. North of Langstaff Road, the freeway passes west of Vaughan Mills shopping centre and Canada's Wonderland amusement park.

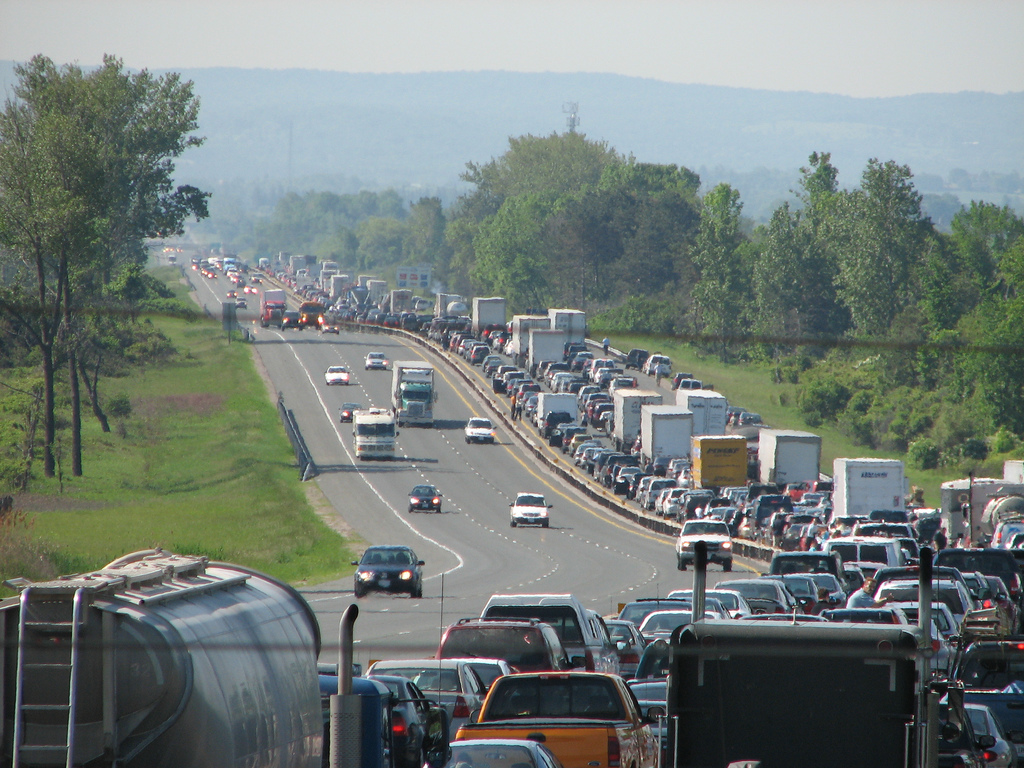
Collisions at locations between the distant interchanges on Highway 400 can cripple movement for several kilometres and hours

From Highway 401 to the Holland Marsh, the freeway largely parallels the arterial/concession roads Weston Road and Jane Street, passing over the height of land at the Oak Ridges Moraine. The highway passes through protected rural areas in northern York Region and encounters rolling countryside in Simcoe County south of Barrie. Between Major Mackenzie Drive and King Road, Highway 400 features HOV lanes which have acceleration/deceleration lanes at entry/exit points. Near the King City ONroute service centre located between Kirby Road and King-Vaughan Road, Highway 400 will meet the future Highway 413, and a short distance north of the Simcoe Road 88 exit, will meet the future Highway 425 (with both highways currently under construction). The section near Barrie is subject to snowsqualls as it lies near the edge of Georgian Bay's snowbelt.

Within Barrie, Highway 400 passes through a trench which places it below grade for most of its length, the route curving around downtown Barrie towards the northeast. On the outskirts of Barrie at a partial interchange, unusually, the through right-of-way continues as the start of Highway 11, which heads northeast towards Orillia and North Bay, while Highway 400 routing continues via a right-hand "exit" to a semi-directional ramp that crosses Highway 11. The split junction is also incomplete; drivers must either use the Forbes Road and Penetanguishene Road interchanges, or continue southbound into Barrie and switch direction at Duckworth Street in order to travel from southbound Highway /11 to northbound Highway 400 or from southbound Highway 400 to northbound Highway 11. After splitting off from Highway 11, Highway 400 veers 90 degrees to the northwest towards Georgian Bay (onwards this segment of freeway is colloquially known as the "400 Extension"), travelling alongside the former Highway 93 to Craighurst.

At Craighurst, the highway again turns northeast, skirting the Copeland Forest and the ski hills of the Oro Moraine, to meet Highway 12, which runs concurrently with the 400 between Exits 141 and 147, in Coldwater. From here, the highway takes on the Trans-Canada Highway designation, and follows a predominantly northwestern heading along what was the route of Highway 69, toward the planned terminus of Sudbury. In Muskoka and Parry Sound Districts, Highway 400 is in most sections a twinned four-lane highway, but several bypasses have and are being built to circumvent the communities along the way. North of the interchange with Highway 522 near Nobel, the divided freeway merges, narrows to two lanes and becomes Highway 69 which continues north to Sudbury. At Port Severn, Highway 400 meets the rugged Canadian Shield, and winds its way north through the granite, often flanked by towering slabs of rock.

== History ==
=== Initial construction ===
Highway 400, along with Highway 401 and Highway 402, was one of the first modern freeways in Ontario. Planning for the Toronto–Barrie Highway, which would become Highway 400, began in 1944. The two routes connecting Barrie with Toronto at the time, Highway 11 and Highway 27, were becoming congested. Grading on a new alignment between Weston Road and Jane Street was completed from Wilson Avenue to Highway 27 (Essa Road) by 1947. The onset of the Korean War slowed construction on the highway considerably, and it was not until December 1, 1951 that two lanes (one in each direction) would be opened to traffic. All four lanes were opened to traffic on July 1, 1952, at which point the highway was designated Highway 400. The name was the scorn of one newspaper editor, who published his distaste for using numbers to name a highway. The freeway featured a 9.1 m (30 ft) grass median.

Shortly after its completion, Hurricane Hazel struck on October 15, 1954. The torrential downpours caused catastrophic damage to southern Ontario, amongst which was the flooding of Holland Marsh to a depth of 3.3 metres (11 ft). Several bridges and sections of road were washed away by Hazel. The damaged highway and bridges were completely reconstructed after the water was pumped away.

Highway 400 crossing the Holland Marsh, under construction in 1946

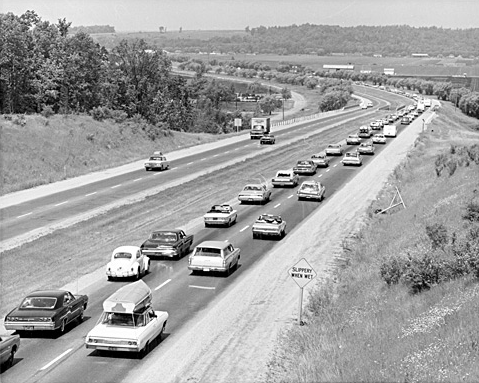
Same angle, but further back, Canada Day, 1967

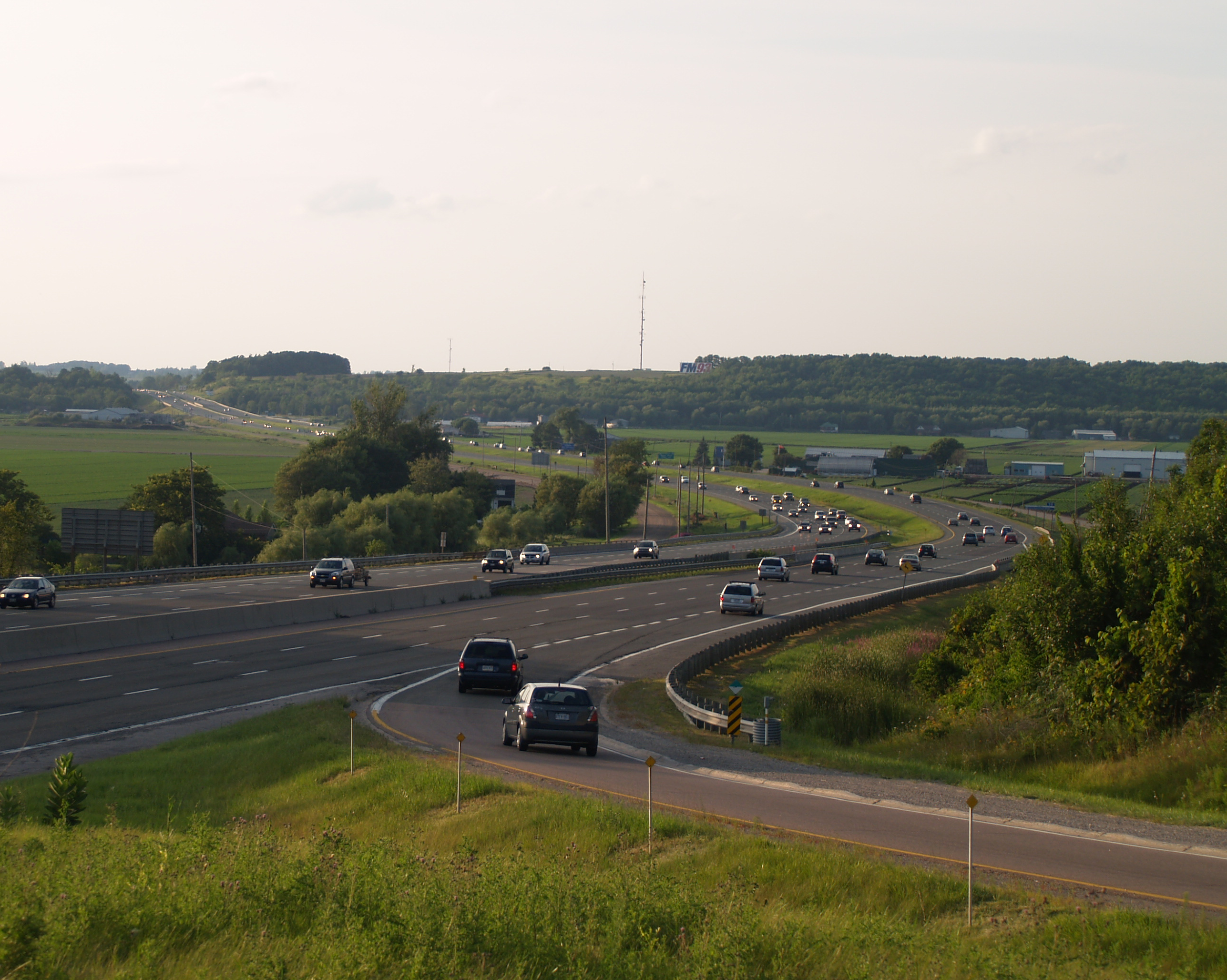
Same angle from Ontario Highway 9 interchange, looking north, 2010

=== Expansion ===
By 1958, Highway 400 was extended north parallel with Highway 93 as a two-lane "super two" with at-grade intersections to Craighurst and construction had begun to extend it further to connect to Highway 12 and Highway 103 south of Coldwater. Both sections opened to traffic on December 24, 1959. For many years afterwards, and still today to older drivers, this portion of the highway (or sometimes even the entire stretch to Parry Sound) north of Barrie is referred to as the "400 Extension". As constructed the extension branched off from the existing highway by means of a partial interchange (since then, newer provincial construction guidelines would have mandated that the existing highway be realigned to flow directly into the extension, while providing an interchange to the section of highway that was bypassed). The extension meant bypassing a 1.1 km (0.68 mi) section of the original freeway that connects to Highway 11 at the Crown Hill interchange, which was then given the internal designation of Highway 400A. (Highway 400A was redesignated as part of Highway 11 on April 1, 1997, while the rest of Highway 11 south of the Crown Hill junction was downloaded to local municipalities, resulting in Highway 11's new southern terminus being at the partial interchange with Highway 400.)

Plans were also conceived to extend the freeway south from Highway 401 to Eglinton Avenue, where it would join two new expressways: the Richview and the Crosstown Expressways, and eventually terminate at the Gardiner Expressway. These plans would never reach fruition, as public opposition to urban expressways cancelled most highway construction in Toronto by 1971. Highway 400 would still open as far south as Jane Street on October 28, 1966, before the rest of the plans were shelved following the cancellation of the Spadina Expressway. The province used the right-of-way in the Black Creek valley to construct a four-lane divided expressway with signalized intersections as far south as Eglinton Avenue, although sufficient space was available for a six-lane freeway with interchanges. The segment between Maple Drive and Jane Street, including the bridges crossing Black Creek and the ramps to/from Jane Street, were built as part of the Black Creek Drive project although it remained under provincial jurisdiction as the southernmost section of Highway 400. Metro's proposal to continue this route further to St. Clair Avenue was opposed by the City of Toronto, so as a compromise the expressway would end at Weston Road which in turn would be widened to support the flow of traffic from the expressway. Originally known as the Northwest Arterial Road, the expressway opened in 1982 as Black Creek Drive and was transferred to Metropolitan Toronto on March 1, 1983. In exchange, the City of Toronto was given expropriated land purchased for Spadina south of Eglinton Avenue to block a further southward extension of Allen Road. Had Metro not agreed to the land transfer, the province would have seized these lands and billed Metro half the cost of Black Creek Drive.

Widening of Highway 400 began in 1971. An additional lane in either direction was created by reducing the 9.1 m median by 6 m (20 ft) and using 1.2 m (4 ft) of the shoulder on each side. The first section to be widened was from Highway 401 to Finch Avenue, which was widened to eight lanes. Soon thereafter, the section from Finch to Highway 88 was widened to six lanes. A year later, the six-lane freeway was extended 41.8 km (26 mi) north to Highway 11.

The super two north of Barrie was twinned starting in 1977, necessitated by the increasing use of the highway by recreational traffic. This work involved the construction of two southbound lanes parallel to the original, with a 30-metre (98 ft) median between them. In addition, at-grade intersections were converted into grade-separated interchanges. This work was completed as far as Highway 93 north of Craighurst by 1982. In 1980 construction began on four-laning the section from Highway 93 to Simcoe County Road 19, which was completed by the end of 1982. During the summer of 1983, four-laning began between Simcoe County Roads 19 and 23, bypassing west of Coldwater. This was completed during the summer of 1985. The old northern terminus of Highway 400 south of Coldwater (Exit 137) is today known as Lower Big Chute Road.

Between 1985 and 1987, the pace of construction slowed temporarily as the foundations for a new southbound structure over Matchedash Bay on Highway 69 (former Highway 103) just north of Highway 12 were compacted and settled. During the fall of 1987, a contract was awarded to extend the four-laning north to Waubaushene and to complete the interchange with Highway 12, first constructed when the super two was extended from Coldwater to Waubaushene in the late 1970s. This work was completed a year later during the fall of 1988.

In 1979–80, ramps serving the freeway south of that crossing were added to the existing Rutherford Road overpass to serve the newly opened Canada's Wonderland theme park. Highway 400 was expanded and upgraded through Vaughan in the late 1980s and early 1990s, largely in tandem with the construction of Highway 407, with a collector-express system added to separate traffic at the Highway 407 interchange from access to Highway 7 and Langstaff Road. As a precursor to the widening of Highway 400, the cloverleaf interchange with Highway 7 was reconfigured to a partial cloverleaf in 1987–88, which included replacing the existing overpass with a longer structure in order to accommodate the future collector/distributor lanes, and would also increase capacity for Highway 7 from four to six general purpose traffic lanes. The northbound lanes of Highway 400 were shifted to a temporary diversion between Steeles Avenue and Highway 7 in order to facilitate construction of the four-level stack interchange with Highway 407, with the precast concrete post-tensioned bridges completed in 1990. Only the third level flyovers were immediately opened to serve Highway 400 traffic, with the rest of the junction closed off for the next few years as work on Highway 407 progressed. Portions of this diversion were later retained for the ramps to and from Highway 407, which opened on June 7, 1997.

=== Twinning Highway 69 ===
North of Highway 12, Highway 400 transitioned into the two-lane Highway 69. Several structures were constructed over the next few years in preparation for twinning Highway 69. In 1988 construction began on the southbound structures over Matchedash Bay and the Canadian National Railway crossing north of Highway 12. Both were complete by the end of 1990. During 1991, construction began on the interchanges at Quarry Road and Port Severn Road, new service roads between those interchanges and the southbound structure over the Trent–Severn Waterway.

Following the twinning of Highway 69 (which was not redesignated as Highway 400 until 1997, several years after completion) to Port Severn, the next target became Parry Sound. In 1988, the Ministry of Transportation of Ontario completed a study of the Highway 69 corridor between Muskoka Road 5 in Port Severn and Tower Road southwest of MacTier, a distance of approximately 45 km (28 mi). This work was carried out through the 1990s, reaching as far as Muskoka Road 38 by 1999. The four-laning was extended north to the Musquash River in October 1999, although an interchange wasn't constructed at Muskoka Road 32/38 until October 2005. However, a land claim dispute between the Government of Ontario and the Wahta Mohawks prevented the twinning of the highway between the Musquash and Moon Rivers. The Territorial Reserve did not oppose the construction; however, the land was unobtainable due to a technicality requiring a minimum voter turnout of 65 percent.

Construction of the Parry Sound Bypass, a new alignment from Badger Road to the Seguin River, began with an interchange along Highway 518 at the site of the future freeway, which was completed during the autumn of 1999. Construction south of the interchange to Badger Road started in November 1999, while the section north of the interchange to the Seguin River began three months later.

On February 7, 2000, the government officially committed to complete Highway 400 to Parry Sound. Work began on two projects as a result of this: a 26.5-kilometre (16.5 mi) bypass of Highway 69 on a new alignment between the Moon River, south of MacTier, and Rankin Lake Road near Horseshoe Lake, as well as a 4-kilometre (2.5 mi) segment connecting that to the Parry Sound Bypass.

The first segment of freeway to be completed north of the Musquash River was the Parry Sound Bypass, which opened on November 1, 2001. This section bypassed to the east of the old highway, now known as Oastler Park Drive. However, it was numbered as Highway 69 for the moment. In October 2002, the section south of the Parry Sound Bypass to Rankin Lake Road was opened. This was followed a year later on October 7 with the opening of the bypass of Highway 69 from the Moon River to Rankin Lake Road, connecting with the Parry Sound segment. At that point, the Highway 400 designation was extended north to the Seguin River. However, the Highway 69 designation remained in place as far south as the Musquash River.

The remaining 8-kilometre (5.0 mi) gap through the Wahta Mohawk Territory would eventually be constructed, starting in December 2004. It opened to traffic during the summer of 2008, completing the freeway south of Parry Sound. Since then, the Highway 69 designation has been removed south of Nobel.

=== Since 2000 ===
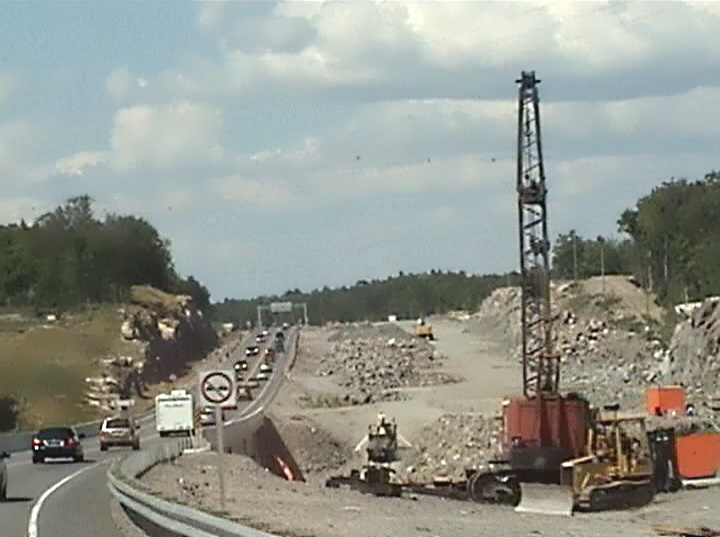
Twinning through the "Wahta Gap" in 2007

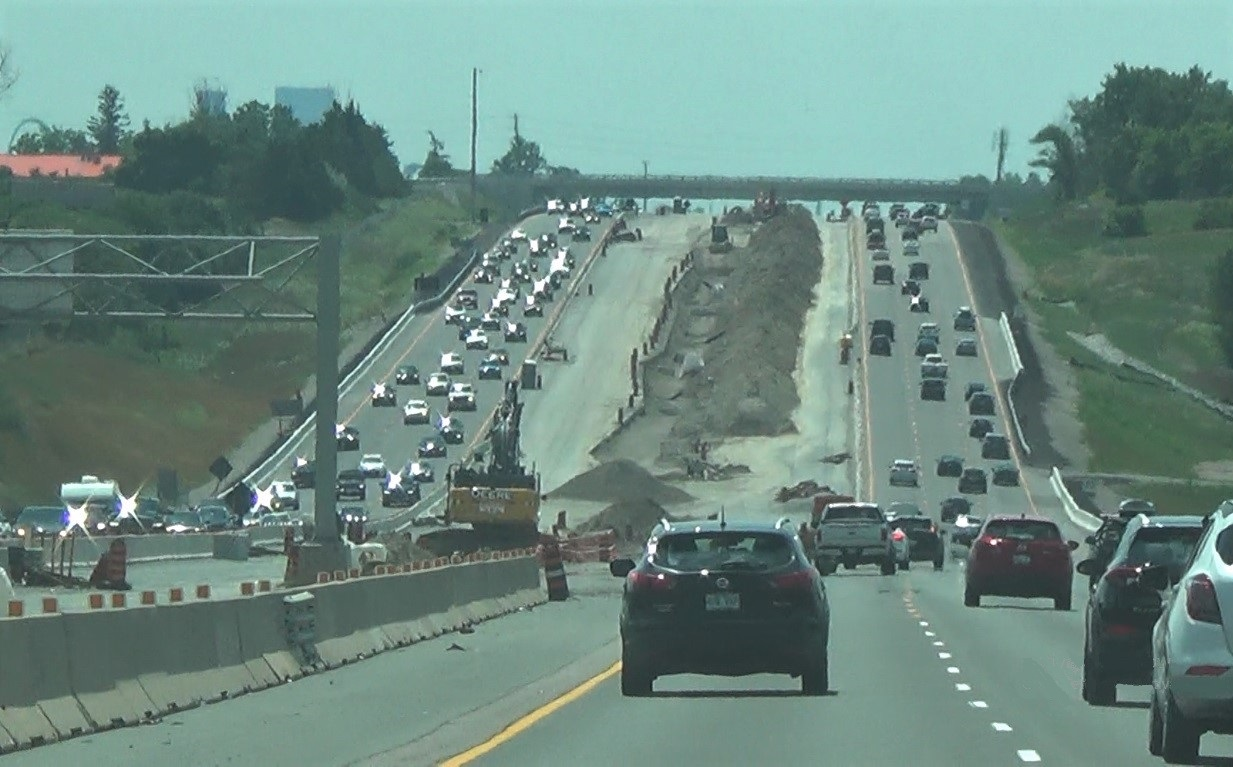
Widening work in King Township in 2020

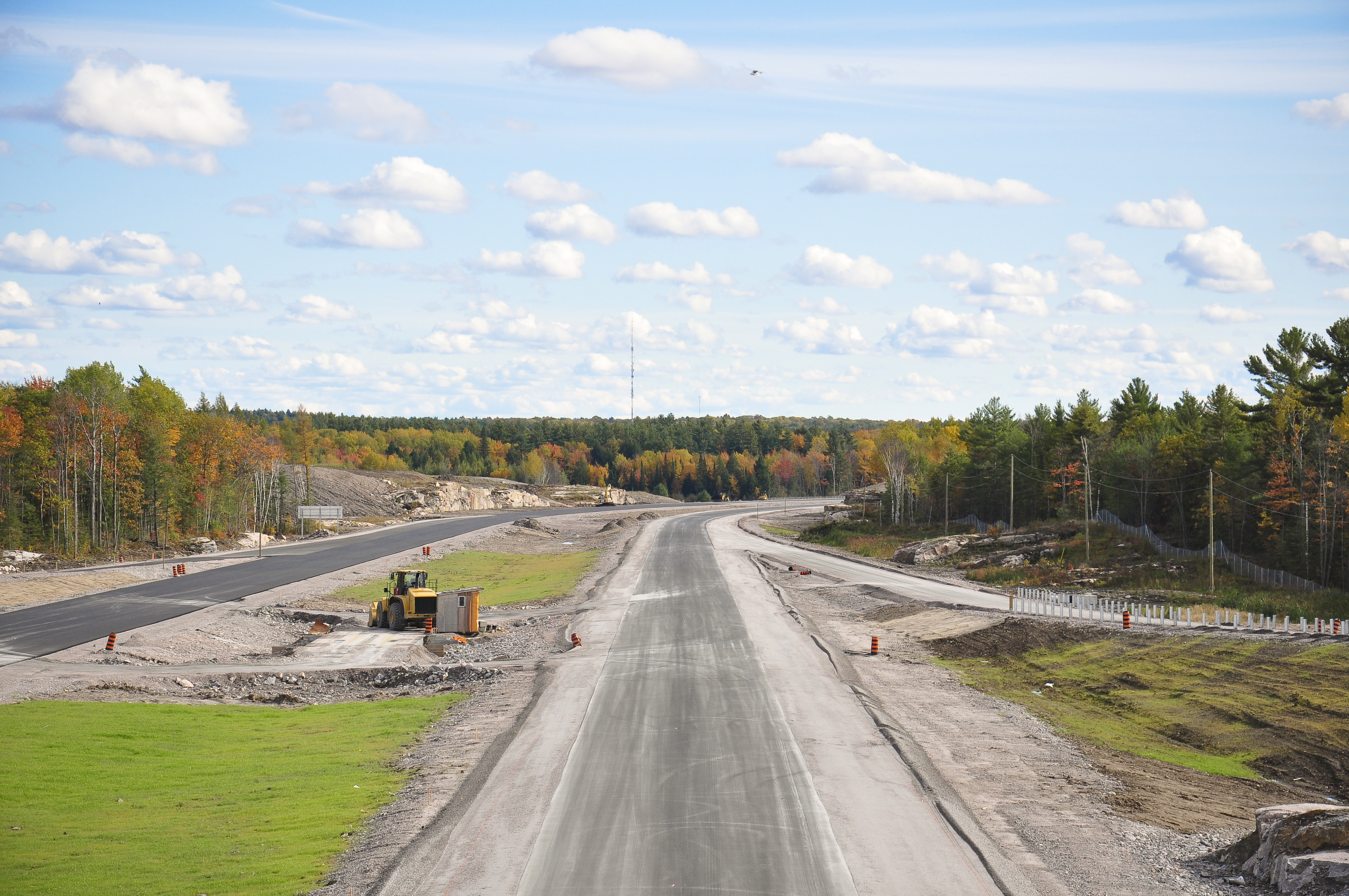
Nobel Bypass under construction north of Parry Sound in 2009

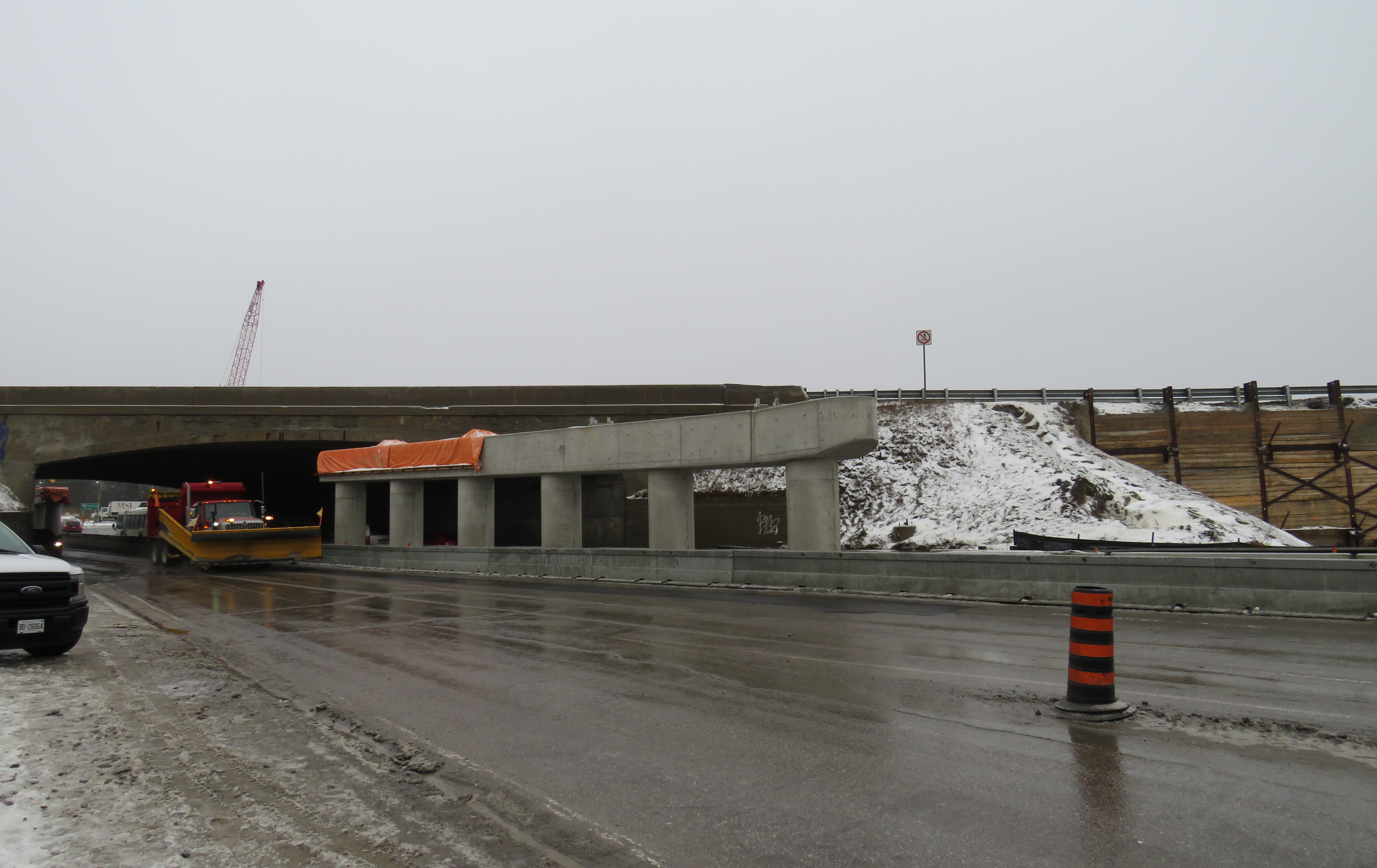
Ongoing pier construction for wider replacement overpass over Essa Road in Barrie in January 2023

As one of the oldest 400-series freeways, several vintage overpasses have been demolished in recent years to accommodate the future widening of Highway 400 to ten lanes in the section from Vaughan to Barrie. Sixteen of these historic structures, sub-standard by today's freeway requirements, remained as of summer 2009, with all slated for replacement in the near future. In order to preserve some of this heritage the Ministry of Transportation created an 1800mm x 1625mm reusable urethane mould of the provincial coat-of-arms from the 5th Line overpass located south of Bradford, which will be used to decorate the replacement structures.

The interchanges at Rutherford Road and Major Mackenzie Drive in Vaughan were extensively reconstructed to modern Parlo A4 configurations in 1993 and 2004, respectively, while a new partial interchange was added for Bass Pro Mills Drive in 2004 to serve the Vaughan Mills shopping centre. In late 2010, the Portage Road overpass crossing Highway 400 was opened. The Highway 9 (Davis Drive) overpass was initially twinned with an addition span on the north side in the late 1990s, however this still permitted only six lanes of Highway 400 to pass underneath, so a decade later the twin structures were replaced with a wider single bridge that was long enough to accommodate future widening of the freeway to eight lanes. The North Canal bridges are to be replaced in order to accommodate eventual expansion of the route and increase vertical clearance over Canal Road.

Construction began north of Barrie in April 2013 to replace the overpass at the Crown Hill junction with Highway 11. The new structure which is designed for higher travel speeds, and also long enough to accommodate future expansion of Highway 11 underneath, was completed in October 2015. The original overpass, built during the 1950s, was demolished during an overnight closure on December 13, 2015. The overall cost of this project was CA$8.5 million.

On February 27, 2014, a major snowsquall affected Highway 400 in Innisfil with heavy wind gusts and near-zero visibility. A total of 96 vehicles were involved in a major collision that ensued near Innisfil Beach Road. Although no injuries were reported, the highway was closed for a day and buses were shuttled in to warm stranded motorists.

In 2017, the provincial government announced the widening of Highway 400 from Major Mackenzie Drive to King Road from 6 lanes to 8 lanes with HOV lanes. The southbound HOV lane was opened on September 11, 2021, while the northbound lane opened two months later on November 11.

As a precursor to the eventual reconfiguration of the Highway 89 junction, the Cookstown service centre was closed on February 1, 2013, while its replacement was shifted to a new site north of Fourth Line while being rebranded as Innisfil ONRoute and it reopened in June 2015. Construction to replace the Highway 89 overpass and realign the interchange to a parclo, with new ramps to be built in the NW quadrant where the service centre was formerly located, commenced in 2019 with an expected completion set for 2021.

There are future plans to widen Highway 400 to 10 lanes throughout Barrie. It was announced in July 2025 that the Dunlop Street overpass would be replaced to accommodate this widening.

== Extension towards Sudbury ==
On June 28, 2005, it was officially confirmed that Highway 69 would be twinned and bypassed north to Highway 17 in Sudbury. This announcement was accompanied by a time line with the completion date set for 2017; in March 2015, the Ministry of Transportation acknowledged that the original completion date would not be met, and announced that its current goal is to have the project completed in the 2020s. However, work was already underway in 2003 to expand Highway 69 south of Sudbury to four lanes. As work is completed at the southern end near Nobel, the Highway 400 designation will be extended north.

Construction began on the segment from Sudbury southwards to Estaire in 2005, while route planning studies were completed for the Estaire to Parry Sound segment. Portions of the route will be opened to traffic in segments as contracts are fulfilled; the segment between Sudbury and Estaire opened on November 12, 2009, while the Nobel bypass from Parry Sound to Highway 559 opened October 26, 2010. As the Sudbury segment of the Highway 69 freeway is discontinuous with Highway 400, it will not be renumbered until the twinning of the intervening section is completed.

On October 27, 2010, one lane in either direction on the Nobel Bypass opened to traffic. The new four-lane bypass, which travels as far north as Highway 559, was fully opened in November. The former route of Highway 69 through the town was renamed as Nobel Drive and was reduced in width from four to two lanes, with a recreational trail constructed alongside the road. Some businesses in Nobel were affected after the opening of the new highway 400 realignment and had to be closed down.

== Services ==
There are currently three service centres (with a fourth closed for redevelopment) located along the southern section of Highway 400: King City, Innisfil and Barrie. The centres were originally leased to and operated by several major gasoline distributors; however, those companies chose not to renew their leases after they expired. In response, the MTO put the operation of the full network of service centres out for tender, resulting in a 50-year lease with Host Kilmer Service Centres, a joint venture between hospitality company HMSHost (a subsidiary of Autogrill) and Larry Tanenbaum's investment company Kilmer van Nostrand, which operates them under the ONroute brand.

The three oldest service centres were reconfigured and reconstructed. Reopening under the ONroute banner, these feature a Canadian Tire gas station, an HMSHost-operated convenience store known as "The Market", as well as fast food brands such as Tim Hortons, A&W and Burger King. The Barrie centre closed for reconstruction on October 19, 2010. The King City service centre relocated a few hundred meters south in October 2012. The Cookstown centre was located at the Highway 89 interchange being incorporated into the southbound ramp (also accessible to northbound traffic by exiting on westbound Highway 89 then turning at a driveway on the west side of the 400) and it closed on February 1, 2013, while its replacement was shifted to a new site north of Fourth Line while being rebranded as Innisfil ONRoute and it reopened in June 2015.

The fourth service centre, the southbound Maple Travel Plaza in Vaughan, was redeveloped in the late 1990s so it remained in service until its closure in April 21, 2025. It will be redeveloped into an ONroute, although a timeline for reopening has not yet been set. Service centres are located at the following points along Highway 400:

Location	Name	Nearby exits	Direction	Status
Vaughan	Maple	37	Southbound	Currently closed (since April 2025) for redevelopment, former plaza leased by Imperial Oil
King	King City	43	Northbound	Reopened October 2012
Innisfil	Innisfil	75	Southbound	Opened June 2015 (relocated)
Barrie	Barrie	94	Northbound	Reopened August 2013

North of Barrie, where average traffic volumes do not warrant large service centres with direct highway access, there are two service campuses operated by Petro-Canada, both containing several fast food outlets, located on crossroads at interchanges in Port Severn (Exit 156) and Seguin Trail (Exit 214) near Parry Sound.

== Exit list ==
The following table lists the major junctions along Highway 400, as noted by the Ministry of Transportation of Ontario.

Division	Location	km	mi	Exit	Destinations	Notes
Toronto		0.0	0.0		Black Creek Drive	Highway 400 southern terminus; continues as Black Creek Drive
Toronto		0.0	0.0	—	Maple Leaf Drive	Overpass; no access
Toronto		0.4	0.25	20	Jane Street	
Toronto		1.6	0.99	21	Highway 401 – London, Kingston	Signed as exits 21A (east) and 21B (west); Highway 401 exit 359
Toronto		1.8	1.1	23	Wilson Avenue	Access to Wilson was removed during the reconstruction of the interchange with Highway 401
Toronto		6.0	3.7	25	Finch Avenue	
Toronto–York boundary	Toronto–Vaughan boundary	8.1	5.0	27	Steeles Avenue	Partial-access interchange with northbound exit and southbound entrance
York	Vaughan					
York	Vaughan	9.3	5.8	26	407 ETR – Hamilton, Peterborough	Tolled; southbound access via express lanes only. Northbound on-ramp to express lanes; NB exit comes before Steeles Avenue exit (exit 27). Signed as exit 26 northbound and southbound; Highway 407 exit 66
York	Vaughan	10.2	6.3	29	Regional Road 7 (Highway 7)	Formerly Highway 7; no access to and from Highway 407.
York	Vaughan	12.2	7.6	31	Regional Road 72 (Langstaff Road)	Northbound exit and southbound entrance; access was misidentified as exit 30 on some maps; no access to and from Highway 407.
York	Vaughan	13.5	8.4	32	Bass Pro Mills Drive	Northbound exit and southbound entrance, access to Vaughan Mills mall opened November 2004.
York	Vaughan	14.3	8.9	33	Regional Road 73 (Rutherford Road)	Northbound exit and southbound entrance opened in May 1981 to accommodate the opening of Canada's Wonderland. Later fully reconstructed into a full interchange in 1993.
York	Vaughan	16.4	10.2	35	Regional Road 25 (Major Mackenzie Drive)	To Canada's Wonderland, Cortellucci Vaughan Hospital and Mackenzie Richmond Hill Hospital
York	Vaughan	18.5	11.5	37	Regional Road 49 (Teston Road)	Opened September 18, 2009
York	Vaughan	19.7– 21.8	12.2– 13.5	Maple (southbound) (Note: Currently closed for redevelopment) and King City (northbound) Service Centres		
York	Vaughan	21.8	13.5	—	Highway 413	Future freeway bypass of western Greater Toronto to connect with Highways 401 and 407 in Halton Hills; interchange to constructed on the site of the King City ONroute Service Centre
York	King	24.8	15.4	43	Regional Road 11 (King Road) – Nobleton, King City	
York	King	34.0	21.1	52	Regional Road 16 (Lloydtown-Aurora Road) – Schomberg, Aurora	
York	King	37.2	23.1	55	Highway 9 west – Orangeville; Regional Road 31 east (Davis Drive) – Newmarket	Highway 9 formerly continued east; to Southlake Regional Health Centre
Simcoe	Bradford West Gwillimbury	40.1	24.9	58	Canal Road	Right-in/right-out interchange; formerly County Road 8; permanently closed on June 10, 2025
Simcoe	Bradford West Gwillimbury	42.9	26.7	61	County Road 14 (Line 5)	Opened December 19, 2018
Simcoe	Bradford West Gwillimbury	45.7	28.4	64	County Road 88 – Bradford, Bond Head	Formerly Highway 88
Simcoe	Bradford West Gwillimbury	47.3	29.4	—	Highway 425 (Bradford Bypass)	Proposed freeway bypass of Bradford and a link to Highway 404 in East Gwillimbury.
Simcoe	Innisfil	57.1	35.5	75	Highway 89 west – Cookstown, Alliston; County Road 89 east	Highway 89 formerly continued east; former location of Cookstown Service Centre (southbound, access incorporated into ramps)
Simcoe	Innisfil	62.3	38.7	Innisfil Service Centre (southbound)		
Simcoe	Innisfil	66.8	41.5	85	County Road 21 (Innisfil Beach Road) – Thornton, Innisfil	
Barrie		71.8	44.6	90	Mapleview Drive	Formerly Molson Park Drive
Barrie		73.6	45.7	Barrie Service Centre (northbound)		
Barrie		75.6	47.0	94	Essa Road	Formerly Highway 27
Barrie		78.0	48.5	96	Dunlop Street – Angus	Signed as exits 96A (east) and 96B (west) northbound; formerly Highway 90
Barrie		80.4	50.0	98	Highway 26 north (Bayfield Street) – Stayner, Wasaga Beach	Highway 26 formerly continued south; former Highway 26 / Highway 27 concurrency
Barrie		83.1	51.6	102	Duckworth Street	To Royal Victoria Regional Health Centre
Barrie		85.8	53.3	106	Highway 11 north – Orillia, North Bay	Northbound left exit (default flow) and southbound left entrance (default flow); signed as Highway 11 northbound, Highway 400 southbound; formerly Highway 400A north
Simcoe	Springwater	92.4	57.4	111	County Road 11 (Forbes Road) – Dalston, Midhurst	
Simcoe	Springwater–Oro-Medonte boundary	98.7	61.3	117	County Road 22 (Horseshoe Valley Road) – Craighurst	
Simcoe	Springwater–Oro-Medonte boundary	102.2	63.5	121	Highway 93 north – Hillsdale, Midland, Penetanguishene; County Road 93 south (Penetanguishene Road)	Highway 93 formerly continued south
Simcoe	Oro-Medonte	112.6	70.0	131	Mount St. Louis Road	To Mount St. Louis Moonstone Ski area
Simcoe	Oro-Medonte	117.5	73.0	136	County Road 19 (Moonstone Road) – Moonstone	
Simcoe	Severn	120.1	74.6	137	Lower Big Chute Road – Coldwater	Northbound exit and southbound entrance
Simcoe	Severn	122.9	76.4	141	Highway 12 east / TCH – Coldwater, Fesserton; County Road 23 west (Vasey Road) – Waverley	Southern end of Highway 12 concurrency; southern end of Trans-Canada Highway designation (continues on Highway 12 east)
Simcoe	Tay–Severn boundary	128.8	80.0	147	Highway 12 west – Waubaushene, Victoria Harbour; County Road 16 south – Orillia	Northern end of Highway 12 concurrency; Highway 12 formerly followed County Road 16
Simcoe	Tay–Severn boundary	129.9	80.7	Crosses Matchedash Bay		
Simcoe	Tay–Severn boundary	131.1	81.5	149	Quarry Road	Formerly County Road 59
Simcoe	Tay–Severn boundary	135.1	83.9	153	Port Severn Road South – Port Severn	
Severn River		135.7– 135.9	84.3– 84.4	Crosses the Trent–Severn Waterway		
Muskoka	Georgian Bay	137.2	85.3	156	District Road 5 (Muskoka Road / Port Severn Road North) – Port Severn, Honey Harbour	Location of Petro-Canada service campus
Muskoka	Georgian Bay	143.5	89.2	162	District Road 34 east (White's Falls Road) – Severn Falls; District Road 48 west (South Bay Road)	
Muskoka	Georgian Bay	148.8	92.5	—	Hidden Glen Road	Semi-private road with southbound right-in/right-out interchange
Muskoka	Georgian Bay	150.8	93.7	168	Georgian Bay Road, Crooked Bay Road	
Muskoka	Georgian Bay	154.2	95.8	174	District Road 33 (South Gibson Lake Road)	
Muskoka	Georgian Bay	175.1	108.8	—	Global Tower Road	Semi-private road with southbound right-in/right-out interchange for access to CIII-DT-7/CHCH-DT-3 tower site
Muskoka	Wahta Mohawk Territory	162.3	100.8	177	District Road 32 (Go Home Lake Road); District Road 38 (Kanien'kehá:ka Iohatátie) – Bala	Indigenous name given to District Road 38 in September 2023
Muskoka	Wahta Mohawk Territory	166.8	103.6	182	Iroquois Cranberry Growers Drive	
Muskoka	Georgian Bay	165.3	102.7	185	District Road 12 (12 Mile Bay Road)	
Muskoka	Georgian Bay	171.1	106.3	189	Lake Joseph Road (Highway 7289 north) – MacTier, Gravenhurst	Formerly Highway 69 north
Parry Sound	Seguin	189.6	117.8	207	Highway 141 east – Rosseau, Huntsville	
Parry Sound	Seguin	195.5	121.5	213	Lake Joseph Road (Highway 7290 south), Rankin Lake Road	Formerly Highway 69 south
Parry Sound	Seguin	198.6	123.4	214	Seguin Trail, Horseshoe Lake Road	Location of Petro Canada service campus
Parry Sound	Seguin	201.8	125.4	217	Oastler Park Drive, Badger Road	
Parry Sound	Seguin	205.2	127.5	220	Highway 518 east (Hunter Drive) – Orrville	
Parry Sound	Parry Sound	208.8	129.7	224	Bowes Street, McDougall Road	Formerly Highway 69B north; to West Parry Sound Health Centre
Parry Sound	Parry Sound	211.3	131.3	229	Parry Sound Drive	
Parry Sound	McDougall	213.9	132.9	231	Highway 124 east – Nobel, Sundridge; Parry Sound Drive – Parry Sound	
Parry Sound	McDougall	219.0	136.1	236	Avro Arrow Road – Nobel	
Parry Sound	McDougall	224.4	139.4	241	Highway 559 west – Killbear Provincial Park	
Parry Sound	Carling	225.7	140.2	Highway 400 ends Highway 69 begins		Highway 400 northern terminus; Highway 69 southern terminus; Trans-Canada Highway continues
Parry Sound	Carling				Woods Road	
Parry Sound	Shawanaga First Nation				Shebeshekong Road (Highway 7182 south)	Former Highway 69 alignment
Parry Sound	The Archipelago				South Shore Road	Pointe au Baril; formerly Highway 644 west
Parry Sound	The Archipelago				Highway 529 north – Bayfield Inlet	
Parry Sound	Unorganized Parry Sound				Harris Lake Road	
Parry Sound	Magnetawan First Nation				Highway 529 south – Byng Inlet, Bayfield Inlet	Specific alignment under review
Parry Sound	Henvey				Highway 526 south – Britt	Specific alignment under review
Parry Sound	Cranberry				Highway 522 east – Trout Creek	Specific alignment under review
Parry Sound	The freeway section opened from north of Highway 522 to Sudbury is not yet designated as Highway 400					
Parry Sound	French River 13			—	Pickerel River Road / Settlers Road	Interchange opened in December 2021
Sudbury	Killarney–French River boundary			—	Highway 607 north / Hartley Bay Road	Bigwood
Sudbury	Killarney–French River boundary			—	Highway 64 north – Noelville, Sturgeon Falls	Interchange opened in July 2016.
Sudbury	Unorganized Sudbury			—	Crooked Lake Road	Delamere access road. Interchange opened in September 2015.
Sudbury	Unorganized Sudbury			—	Highway 637 west – Killarney	Interchange opened in October 2012.
Sudbury	Unorganized Sudbury			—	Nelson Road – Estaire	Interchange opened in November 2009.
Sudbury	Greater Sudbury			—	Highway 537 – Wanup, Wahnapitae	Interchange opened in November 2009.
Sudbury	Greater Sudbury			—	Estaire Road	Interchange opened in November 2009.
Sudbury	Greater Sudbury				Highway 17 (Southeast Bypass) / TCH – Sault Ste. Marie, North Bay	Final phase to link to Highway 17 (Southeast Bypass)
1.000 mi = 1.609 km; 1.000 km = 0.621 mi: Closed/former; Concurrency terminus; Electronic toll collection; Incomplete access; Route transition; Unopened

== Notes ==
Trans-Canada Highway
Previous route Highway 69	Highway 400	Next route Highway 12
