= Ontario Highway 529 =

Ontario provincial highway

Highway 529

Route information
- Maintained by the Ministry of Transportation of Ontario
- Length: 25.7 km (16.0 mi)
- Existed: May 9, 1956–present

Major junctions
- South end: Highway 69 near Pointe au Baril
- North end: Highway 69 at Magnetawan River

Location
- Country: Canada
- Province: Ontario
- Districts: Parry Sound
- Major cities: Manbert, Naiscoot, Naiscoutaing

Highway system
- Ontario provincial highways; Current; Former; 400-series
← Highway 528	→ Highway 529A

Secondary Highway 529, commonly referred to as Highway 529, is a provincially maintained secondary highway in the Canadian province of Ontario. Located within Parry Sound District, the highway follows a 25.7-kilometre (16.0 mi) route, from its southern terminus at Highway 69 near Pointe au Baril to its northern terminus at the Highway 69 crossing of the Magnetawan River near Byng Inlet. Two spur routes, Highway 529A and Highway 645, branch off the highway to serve the communities of Bayfield Inlet and Byng Inlet, respectively. The route was established along the present alignment of Highway 529A in 1956. It was relocated in 1961 along the former routing of Highway 69 when a bypass opened through the area, with the former alignment being renumbered as Highway 529A.

== Route description ==
Highway 529 begins in the south in The Archipelago at Highway 69, which it generally parallels several kilometres to the west, immediately north of Pointe au Baril. The route crosses the Canadian Pacific (CP) railway line which lay between the two routes before curving north near the entrance to Sturgeon Bay Provincial Park. It zigzags to the north and west through forests and rocks, intersecting the eastern terminus of Highway 529A before curving back east and then north. The route enters the Shawanaga First Nation reserve and crosses the Naiscoot River before jogging east. The remainder of the route follows traverse lines as it proceeds north into the township of Wallbridge, passing east of Giroux Lake. It encounters the Magnetawan First Nation reserve No. 1, within which is an intersection with the eastern terminus of Highway 645. The route curves northeast and crosses the CP railway a second time before ending at Highway 69 just south of its crossing of the Magnetawan River.

Highway 529 is 25.7 kilometres (16.0 mi) in length and serves the communities of Manbert, Naiscoot and Naiscoutaing. It is paved in its entirety. Two spur routes, Highway 529A and Highway 645, branch off the highway to serve the communities of Bayfield Inlet and Byng Inlet, respectively.

== History ==
Highway 529 is a former alignment of Highway 69. The route was established on May 9, 1956 when the Department of Highways (DHO), predecessor to the modern Ministry of Transportation (MTO), assumed control of the Bayfield Road. This original section was renumbered in 1961 as Highway 529A. A new bypass of the original route of Highway 69 between Pointe-au-Baril and the Magnetewan River was opened that year, and consequently the old alignment was renumbered as Highway 529.

In the freeway conversion plans for Highway 69 through the Pointe au Baril area, a new bypass will be built and Highway 529 will assume the current route of Highway 69 through the community, extending the length of the highway by approximately four kilometres to a new interchange with what will become Highway 400.

== Major intersections ==
The following table lists the major junctions along Highway 529, as noted by the Ministry of Transportation of Ontario. The entire route is located in Parry Sound District.

Location	km	mi	Destinations	Notes
The Archipelago	0.0	0.0	Highway 69 south – Parry Sound	Trans-Canada Highway
The Archipelago	6.8	4.2	Highway 529A – Bayfield Inlet	
Magnetawan First Nation	23.7	14.7	Highway 645 – Byng Inlet	
Magnetawan First Nation	25.8	16.0	Highway 69 north – Sudbury	Trans-Canada Highway
1.000 mi = 1.609 km; 1.000 km = 0.621 mi
