= Ontario Highway 69 =

Ontario provincial highway

Highway 69
- Trans-Canada Highway
- Highway 69 highlighted in red

Route information
- Maintained by the Ministry of Transportation of Ontario
- Length: 140.3 km (87.2 mi)
- Existed: August 5, 1936–present

Major junctions
- South end: Highway 400 near Carling (north of exit 241)
- Highway 64 at Rutter
- North end: Highway 17 in Sudbury

Location
- Country: Canada
- Province: Ontario

Highway system
- Ontario provincial highways; Current; Former; 400-series
← Highway 67	→ Highway 71
Former provincial highways
← Highway 68	Highway 70 →

King's Highway 69, commonly referred to as Highway 69, is a provincially maintained north–south highway in the central portion of the Canadian province of Ontario. In conjunction with Highway 400, it links Toronto with the city of Greater Sudbury at Highway 17, via Parry Sound. It is part of the Trans-Canada Highway and the National Highway System. From its southern terminus of Highway 559 at Carling, Highway 69 begins as Highway 400 narrows from a four-lane freeway to a two-lane highway. It travels northerly for approximately 68 kilometres (42 mi) to south of the French River, before widening back to a divided, four-lane freeway for approximately 64 kilometres (40 mi) into Sudbury. The final 6 kilometres (3.7 mi) of the route, connecting to Highway 17, is a five-lane arterial road that will be converted to freeway as the final phase of the four-laning.

Highway 69 was first designated in 1936 when the Department of Highways (DHO) assumed the Rama Road between Atherley and Washago. This short route was extended the following year when the DHO merged with the Department of Northern Development and expanded the King's Highway network north of the Severn River. By the beginning of World War II, the route reached as far north as Britt; a separate segment connected the town of Burwash with Sudbury. However, the rationing of labour and materials due to the war effort resulted in these two sections remaining separated until the mid-1950s. In 1976, several reroutings and renumbering took place in the Muskoka area. As a result, the portion of Highway 69 between Brechin and Foot's Bay was renumbered as Highway 169, while the entirety of Highway 103 between Coldwater and Foot's Bay was renumbered as Highway 69.

Between 1956 and 1979, Highway 69 extended through and north of Sudbury. Until some point between 1974 and 1977, it reached as far north as Capreol, after which it was truncated at Hanmer. By 1980, the northern terminus had shifted to the Southwest Bypass, onto which Highway 17 was rerouted in 1995. Throughout the 1990s and 2000s, Highway 400 was gradually pushed north to its current terminus by twinning Highway 69, gradually truncating its length. A commitment to complete four-laning to Sudbury has been made by all three major provincial political parties in Ontario since 1991, but as of 2022, there remains 70 kilometres (43 mi) of two lane highway still to be constructed. Various former alignments of Highway 69 remain in use as directional carriageways of Highway 400 or as local roads. The highway forms part of the Georgian Bay Route of the Trans-Canada Highway, which continues south along Highway 400.

The speed limit is 110 km/h (68 mph) for the freeway portion of the route and 90 km/h (56 mph) for the undivided portion except through Pointe au Baril, where the speed limit is 70 km/h (43 mph). The route is patrolled by the Ontario Provincial Police (OPP) and maintained by the Ministry of Transportation of Ontario (MTO).

== Route description ==
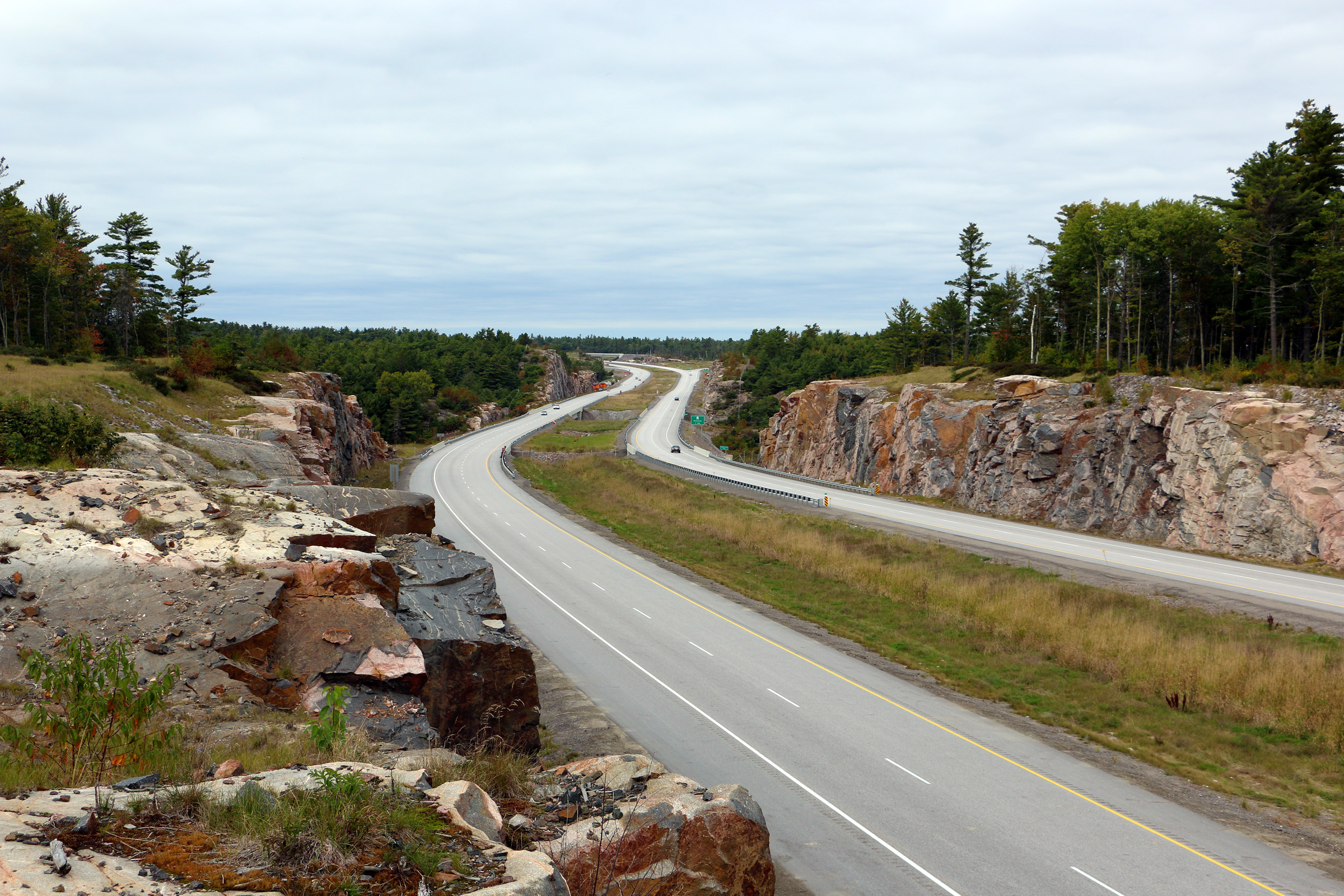
Highway 69 looking northerly at Lovering Lake south of Highway 637

Highway 69 is a major highway serving the recreational areas surrounding Georgian Bay and the Thirty Thousand Islands, as well as providing the westernmost fixed connection between southern and northern Ontario; the highway occupies the northern portion of a corridor that connects Toronto to Sudbury, with Highway 400 occupying the southern portion. While Highway 6 is located further west, it requires the use of a ferry service between the Bruce Peninsula and Manitoulin Island.

Between Nobel and Sudbury, there are no large communities, although numerous small communities lie adjacent to the route, including the Shawanaga First Nation, Pointe au Baril, Magnetawan First Nation, Byng Inlet, Britt, Bigwood, Delamere and the Henvey Inlet First Nation. As of 2023, the highway begins 1.0 kilometre (0.62 mi) north of Highway 559 (Exit 241) in Carling, where the divided, four-lane Highway 400 narrows into the two-laned Highway 69 (that will serve as the future southbound lanes). Construction is scheduled to begin in the mid-2020s to extend Highway 400 northward by 11 kilometres (6.8 mi) from Highway 559 to Shebooshekong Road near the Shawanaga First Nation.

Highway 69 travels in a predominantly north-northeast direction, well inland of Georgian Bay. The Canadian Shield dominates the topography, resulting in numerous transverse marshes and rock outcroppings that bisect the highway, with dense forests in between; services are limited and distant. Exiting Carling Township, the highway enters The Archipelago, where it scrapes the northeastern edge of the Shawanaga First Nation. It provides access to Pointe au Baril and Pointe au Baril Station before intersecting the southern end of Highway 529, a former alignment of the highway. It enters Unorganized Centre Parry Sound District, a sparsely-inhabited agglomeration of townships, where it provides access to Britt and Britt Station, as well as the northern end of Highway 529.

Progressing north, Highway 69 enters Sudbury District at the community of Key River. It passes through Cranberry, intersecting Highway 522. Highway 69 widens to a four-lane freeway north of Highway 522 before briefly curving northward. It crosses the French River near Wanikewin and encounters an interchange with Highway 607 near Bigwood. It remains a divided four-laned freeway the remainder of its journey into Sudbury, passing by the communities of Rutter, Burwash, Estaire, and Wanup before merging into a four-lane arterial road immediately southeast of Highway 17 at the Southeast Bypass. The highway ends at the interchange with the main Trans-Canada Highway (Highway 17); past this point, the roadway continues into Sudbury as Municipal Road 46 (Regent Street).

== History ==
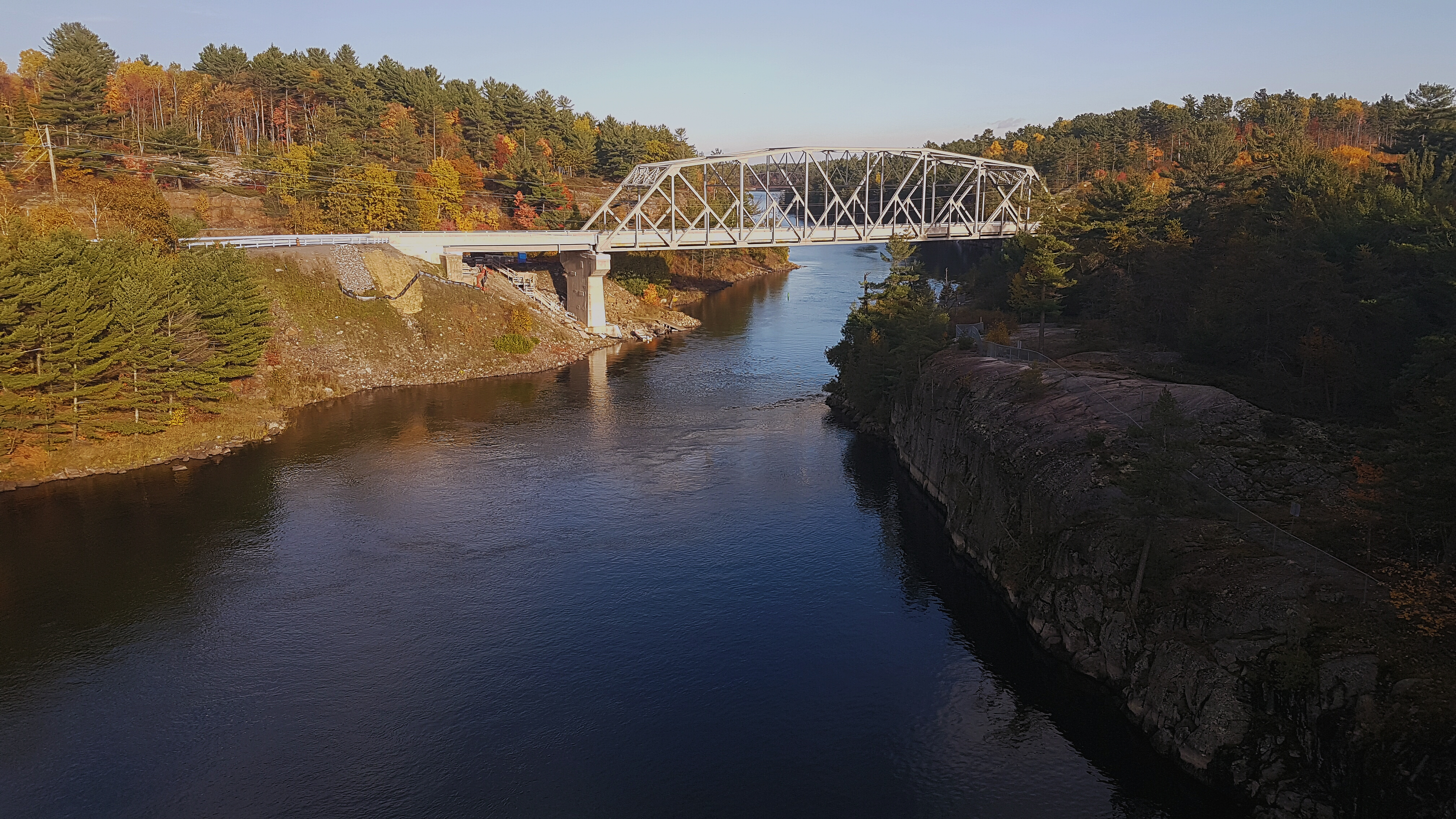
The former Highway 69 bridge over the French River in 2016. Since 2021, the highway crosses the river on replacement twin structures. The bridge remains in service and now carries a local road.

Highway 69 has undergone several major changes during its existence, so much so that the first section designated has not been a King's Highway for 60 years and lay approximately 80 km (50 mi) from the current highway. In other places, a minor two-lane gravel highway has gradually been upgraded to a four-lane freeway. On August 5, 1936, the DHO assumed the Rama Road, connecting Highway 12 at Atherley with Highway 11 at Washago. On March 31, 1937, the Department of Northern Development (DND) was merged into the DHO, allowing the latter to extend the provincial highway network north of the Severn River. Subsequently, through August 1937, Highway 69 was extended 77.75 mi (125.13 km) north to the Naiscoot River, midway between Pointe au Baril and Britt. This extension followed DND trunk routes to Nobel, where a munitions and aircraft factory would soon provide an instrumental role in the war effort. In the north, the road connecting Sudbury and Burwash was also assumed as Highway 69 on August 11. It was intended to connect these two segments over the next several years; however, the outbreak of World War II in September 1939 halted all non-essential construction due to the short supply of labour and materials. Although an extension from the Naiscoot River to Britt would open by 1940.

Once the war ended, construction resumed to bridge the 65 kilometres (40 mi) gap between the two sections of Highway 69. French River and Alban would be linked to the provincial highway network via Britt by 1952. This allowed motorists to take a far more direct route between Severn River and Sudbury, by taking advantage of a detour via Highway 535 and Highway 64, through the small communities of Hagar and Noëlville. That same year also saw the rerouting of the southern end of the highway; the southern end was moved east from Atherley to Brechin and the Rama Road decommissioned as a provincial highway. The new routing was longer but gave the southern end of the highway a more significant purpose than as a bypass of Highway 11. The Rama Road has since been known as Simcoe County Road 44.

The biggest gap that remained on Highway 69 was between Alban and Burwash, but this was eliminated from 1952 to 1955, providing a third link from Southern Ontario to Northern Ontario (the other two being Highway 11 and Highway 17). Until Highway 69 was completed between Parry Sound and Sudbury, drivers travelling between Southern Ontario and Sudbury or Sault Ste. Marie had to travel along a circuitous routing via Highway 11 to North Bay, and thence along Highway 17 to Sudbury and beyond to Sault Ste. Marie. In 1956, Highway 69 was extended north of Sudbury to Capreol, bringing its length to 292.9 kilometres (182.0 mi).

The year 1976 saw big changes for Highway 69. The portion of highway south of MacTier was shifted onto the routing of former Highway 103, completely absorbing that roadway into its length. The former routing was renamed Highway 169. It was at this time that Highway 69 was at its longest, from Highway 12 and Highway 400 at Waubaushene north to Sudbury. Until the mid-1970s, Highway 69 continued through Sudbury along Regent Street, Paris Street and Notre Dame Avenue, and into the suburban towns of Valley East and Capreol. At some point between 1974 and 1977, it was truncated at Hanmer. By 1980, the northern terminus had shifted to the Southwest Bypass. While this route is no longer part of the provincial highway, and is officially designated as a series of Sudbury Municipal Roads, it is still often referred to locally as "Highway 69 North".

=== Four-laning ===
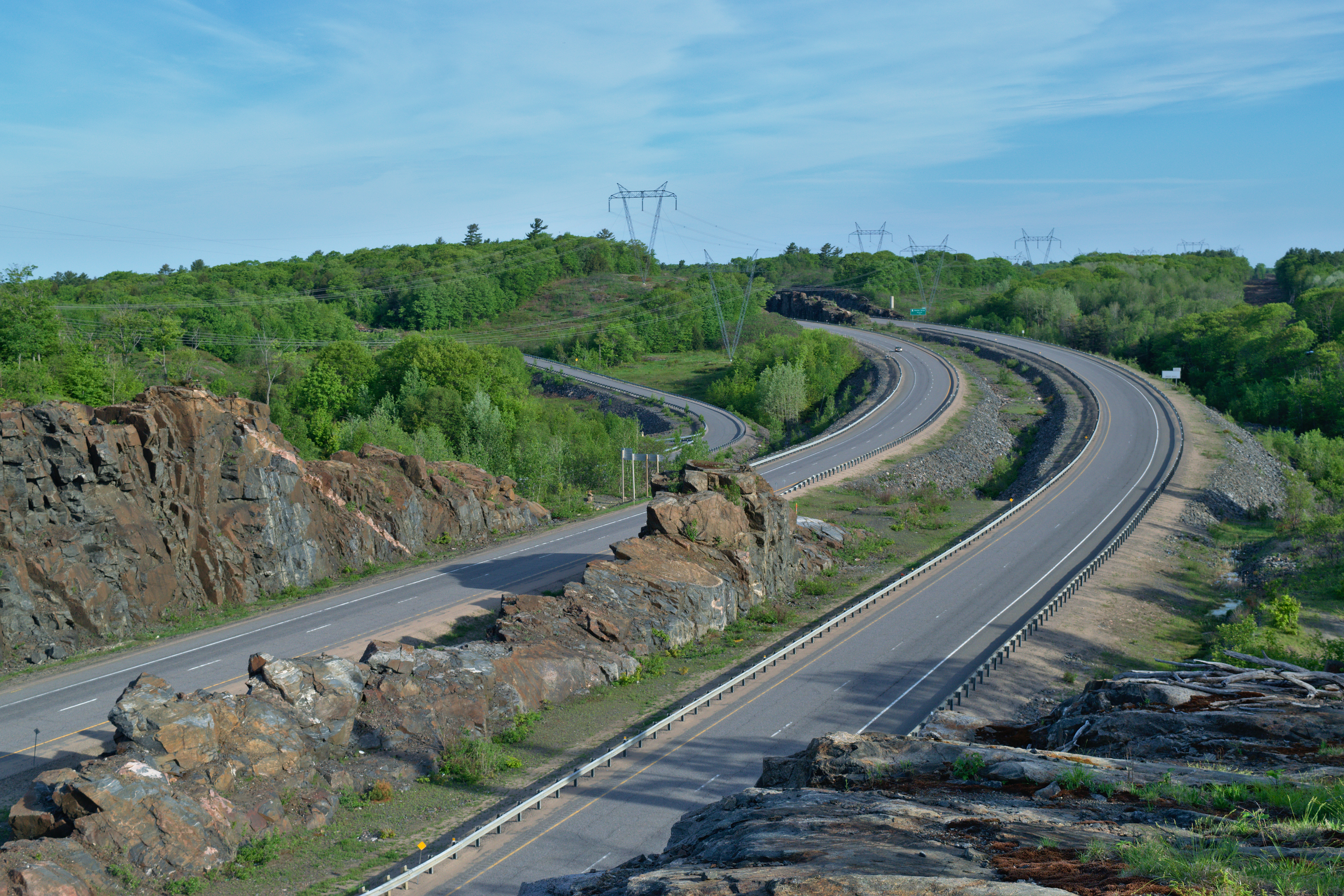
The Parry Sound bypass, which now forms part of Highway 400, opened on November 1, 2001, as part of Highway 69.

Although planning for an eventual four-lane highway started in 1969, the commitment to expand the entirety of Highway 69 to a full freeway was first made in 1991 by the New Democrat government of Bob Rae. The first work on the southernmost portion of the highway had already begun in 1990, with the construction of the southbound structures over Matchedash Bay and the Canadian National Railway crossing north of Highway 12. Both were complete by the end of 1990. During 1991, construction began on the interchanges at Quarry Road and Port Severn Road, new service roads between those interchanges and the southbound structure over the Trent–Severn Waterway. In 1988, the Ministry of Transportation of Ontario completed a study of the Highway 69 corridor between Muskoka Road 5 in Port Severn and Tower Road southwest of MacTier, a distance of approximately 45 km (28 mi). This work was carried out through the 1990s as one large project, reaching as far as south of Go Home Lake Road (Muskoka District Roads 32/38) by mid-to-late 1997. It was extended 4 kilometres (2.5 mi) farther to south of the Musquash River in October 1999. The Highway 400 designation was moved north, and Highway 69 equally shortened, after each project.

Engineering was underway on the first 65 kilometres (40 mi) south of Sudbury. However, that project was shelved by the Progressive Conservative (PC) government of Mike Harris shortly after the 1995 provincial election. Despite this, construction of the segment from Highway 141 to the Seguin River, proceeded in November 1999, and the MacTier bypass south of Highway 141 to the Moon River in February 2000. The majority of these three projects were built on a new alignment, with the former route of Highway 69 becoming Lake Joseph Road and Oastler Park Road. Lake Joseph Road is maintained by the MTO as an unsigned highway. The portion south of Highway 141 designated as Highway 7289, and the northern portion as Highway 7290. The Parry Sound Bypass, from Badger Road to the Seguin River, opened on November 1, 2001; the section from Highway 141 to Badger Road opened in October 2002; and the MacTier Bypass opened on October 7, 2003.

The Highway 400 designation was extended northward from the Musquash River to the Seguin River following the opening of the MacTier Bypass, but the Highway 69 designation remained in place as a concurrency. This was due a 7.6-kilometre (4.7 mi) two lane gap between the Musquash and Moon Rivers, passing through the Wahta Mohawks territory, that came to be known as the Wahta Gap. The Territorial Reserve did not oppose the construction; however, the land was unobtainable due to a technicality requiring a minimum voter turnout of 65 percent. The land claim was settled by a vote held on October 25, 2003. Following ratification, construction began in December 2004, and opened July 15, 2008. Following its completion, Highway 69 was truncated at what is now the south junction of Lake Joseph Road (Exit 189) near MacTier, an overall reduction of over 40 kilometres (24.9 mi) since prior to 1989.

The City of Sudbury continued to lobby for the expansion of the highway, calling attention especially to an ongoing series of fatal car accidents at the intersection of Highway 637, where a sharp S-curve along Highway 69 rendered the approaching intersection effectively invisible to northbound traffic. Assisted by Rick Bartolucci, the Liberal MPP for Sudbury, the CRASH 69 (Community Rallying Against Substandard Highway 69) committee of Sudbury residents campaigned throughout the late 1990s and early 2000s to have the project reinstated.

Premier Harris' successor (and former MPP for Parry Sound—Muskoka), Ernie Eves, announced the resumption of construction between Parry Sound and Sudbury in 2002; however, the PCs did not commit to four-laning the entire route. The Liberal government of Dalton McGuinty came to power following the 2003 election with a promise to have a commitment in place within six months. Construction began on a 20-kilometre (12 mi) segment south of Sudbury to Estaire in January 2005, with route planning studies now completed for the remaining two-lane sections. In June of that year, construction began on a 16-kilometre (9.9 mi) extension of four-laning from Parry Sound to north of Nobel. Later in 2005, the provincial government announced that four-laning between Parry Sound and Sudbury would be completed by 2017.

The first project completed north of Parry Sound was the section between Sudbury and Estaire, which opened on November 12, 2009. The section from south of the Seguin River in Parry Sound to north of Highway 559, bypassing Nobel, opened on October 26, 2010. The former alignment in Sudbury is now known as Estaire Road, while the former route through Nobel is now Nobel Road. In 2008, work began to realign the S-curve at Highway 637; two lanes opened to traffic on July 27, 2010, while the completed four-lane route, with an interchange at Highway 637, opened to traffic on August 8, 2012. The former alignment now has the name Murdock River Road, and serves as a local road accessible only from Highway 637. In the summer of 2012, the Highway 69 designation was shortened by 63.4 kilometres (39.4 mi), between MacTier and 1 kilometre north of Highway 559, resulting in its current length.

Highway 69 passes through significant tracts of wilderness and forested land, and consequently has seen a rate of animal collisions well above the provincial norm. Several segments of the four-laned route will include special grade-separated wildlife crossings, the first of which was completed in March 2012. In the summer of 2012, work began to four lane a 9-kilometre (5.6 mi) segment between north of Highway 64 and the Murdock River, as well as on a 11-kilometre (6.8 mi) segment between Highway 607 and north of Highway 64. The first project was opened September 11, 2015, while the segment from north of Highway 607 to north of Highway 64, including an interchange at the latter, was opened by the beginning of August 2016. The most recently completed section as of 2023 was a 14-kilometre (8.7 mi) segment from north of Highway 522 to north of Highway 607 that opened on December 23, 2021.

== Future ==
In the early 2010s, a widespread perception that the project appeared to be falling behind schedule was frequently discussed in Sudbury's media and by candidates in municipal and provincial elections, but the Ministry of Transportation continued to assert that the project was on track for completion in 2017. Although the original plan called for the four-laning of the highway to be completed by that year, the timeline was pushed back due to delays in environmental assessments and land negotiations with First Nations bands that were impacted by the construction. In March 2015, the ministry officially acknowledged that the 2017 timeline would not be met, and indicated that the new target date was between 2019 and 2021. In 2017, however, although the ministry made no formal announcement, its annual Northern Highways Report listed a completion date within that period only for the section already under construction between the French River and north of Highway 522 at Grundy Lake Provincial Park. This section opened several months ahead of the originally foreseen completion date of 2022.

As of 2021, the remaining route between Nobel and Grundy Lake was listed with a completion date as "beyond 2021". A 19.3-kilometre (12.0 mi) section from north of the Magnetawan River to Grundy Lake is funded, but has no announced construction timeline. In 2026, after four fatal vehicle accidents occurred on the remaining two-lane stretch within less than one month, each of which resulted in the highway being closed to all traffic for several hours, Sudbury MPPs Jamie West and France Gélinas launched Four Lanes and No Excuses, a new campaign to call for action on completing the four-laning.

In November 2026, in response to a question in from Gélinas in the legislature regarding another recent spate of car accident deaths on the highway, transport minister Prabmeet Sarkaria indicated that construction on four of the six remaining segments will begin in 2027.

== Major intersections ==
The following table lists the major junctions along Highway 69, as noted by the Ministry of Transportation of Ontario.

Division	Location	km	mi	Exit	Destinations	Notes
Simcoe	Tay–Severn boundary	−100.3	−62.3	147	Highway 400 south / Highway 12 / TCH – Barrie, Toronto Highway 12 west – Waubaushene, Victoria Harbour; County Road 16 south – Orillia	Former Highway 69 southern terminus (1976-1997); Highway 12 formerly continued on County Road 16; Trans-Canada Highway follows Highway 12 east
Simcoe	Tay–Severn boundary	−99.2	−61.6	Crosses Matchedash Bay		
Simcoe	Tay–Severn boundary	−98.0	−60.9	149	Quarry Road	Formerly County Road 59
Simcoe	Tay–Severn boundary	−94.0	−58.4	153	Port Severn Road South – Port Severn	
Severn River		−93.4– −93.2	−58.0– −57.9	Crosses the Trent–Severn Waterway		
Muskoka	Georgian Bay	−91.8	−57.0	156	District Road 5 (Muskoka Road / Port Severn Road North) – Port Severn, Honey Harbour	
Muskoka	Georgian Bay	−83.5	−51.9	162	District Road 34 east (White's Falls Road) – Severn Falls; District Road 48 west (South Bay Road)	
Muskoka	Georgian Bay	−79.0	−49.1	Highway 69 southern terminus from 1997-1999		
Muskoka	Georgian Bay	−76.2	−47.3	168	Georgian Bay Road, Crooked Bay Road	
Muskoka	Georgian Bay	−72.8	−45.2	174	District Road 33 (South Gibson Lake Road)	
Muskoka	Wahta Mohawk Territory	−69.3– −70.0	−43.1– −43.5	177	District Road 32 (Go Home Lake Road); District Road 38 – Bala	Interchange opened in 2005
Muskoka	Wahta Mohawk Territory	−66.2	−41.1	Highway 69 southern terminus from 1999-2008		
Muskoka	Wahta Mohawk Territory	−63.2	−39.3	182	Iroquois Cranberry Growers Drive	
Muskoka	Georgian Bay	−61.7	−38.3	185	District Road 12 (12 Mile Bay Road)	
Muskoka	Georgian Bay	−61.2	−38.0	Moon River crossing		
Muskoka	Georgian Bay	−58.2	−36.2	189	Highway 400 / TCH Lake Joseph Road (Highway 7289 north)	Highway 69 southern terminus from 2008-2012; former Highway 69 follows Lake Joseph Road; present-day Highway 7289 southern terminus
Muskoka	Georgian Bay	−53.8	−33.4		District Road 11 north – MacTier	
Muskoka	Muskoka Lakes	−52.1	−32.4		District Road 169 east – Bala, Gravenhurst	Foot's Bay; formerly Highway 169 east
Parry Sound	Seguin	−43.0	−26.7		Highway 612 south – MacTier	Gordon Bay
Parry Sound	Seguin	−36.3	−22.6		Highway 141 west (to Highway 400)	Southern end of Highway 141 concurrency (2003-2012); present-day Highway 7289 northern terminus
Parry Sound	Seguin	−32.8	−20.4		Highway 141 east – Rosseau	Northern end of Highway 141 concurrency (2003-2012); former Highway 141 western terminus (pre-2003); present-day Highway 7290 southern terminus
Parry Sound	Seguin	−30.2	−18.8	213	Highway 400 / TCH Lake Joseph Road (Highway 7290 south)	Southern end of Highway 400 concurrency (2003-2012)
Parry Sound	Seguin	−27.1	−16.8	214	Seguin Trail, Horseshoe Lake Road	
Parry Sound	Seguin	−23.9	−14.9	217	Oastler Park Drive, Badger Road	Highway 69 former alignment (pre-2003)
Parry Sound	Seguin	−20.5	−12.7	220	Highway 518 east (Hunter Drive) – Orrville	
Parry Sound	Parry Sound	−16.9	−10.5	224	Bowes Street, McDougall Road	Formerly Highway 69B north
Parry Sound	Parry Sound	−14.4	−8.9	229	Parry Sound Drive	Former alignment of Highway 69
Parry Sound	McDougall	−11.8	−7.3	231	Highway 124 east – Nobel, Sundridge; Parry Sound Drive – Parry Sound	
Parry Sound	McDougall	−1.3	−0.81	241	Highway 559 west – Killbear Provincial Park	
Parry Sound	Carling	0.0	0.0	Highway 400 ends Highway 69 begins		Highway 400 northern terminus; Highway 69 southern terminus; Trans-Canada Highway continues
Parry Sound	Shawanaga First Nation	17.2	10.7		Shebeshekong Road (Highway 7182 south)	Former Highway 69 alignment
Parry Sound	The Archipelago	26.4	16.4		South Shore Road	Pointe au Baril; formerly Highway 644 west
Parry Sound	The Archipelago	28.3	17.6		Highway 529 north – Bayfield Inlet	Formerly Highway 69 north
Parry Sound	Magnetawan First Nation	48.3	30.0		Highway 529 south – Byng Inlet, Bayfield Inlet	Formerly Highway 69 south
Parry Sound	Henvey	53.5	33.2		Highway 526 south – Britt	
Parry Sound	Cranberry	66.3	41.2		Highway 522 east – Trout Creek	
Parry Sound	Unorganized Centre Parry Sound	70.0	43.5	Beginning of divided freeway		
Parry Sound	French River 13	72.9	45.3	—	Pickerel River Road / Settlers Road	Interchange opened December 23, 2021
French River		76.0	47.2	Crosses French River		
Sudbury	Killarney – French River boundary	80.5	50.0	—	Highway 607 north / Harley Bay Road	Bigwood
Sudbury	Killarney – French River boundary	90.3	56.1	—	Highway 64 north – Noelville, Sturgeon Falls	Rutter; interchange opened August 2016
Sudbury	Unorganized Sudbury District	102.0	63.4	—	Crooked Lake Road	Interchange opened September 11, 2015
Sudbury	Unorganized Sudbury District	107.1	66.5	—	Highway 637 west – Killarney	Interchange opened August 8, 2012
Sudbury	Unorganized Sudbury District	119.1	74.0	—	Nelson Road – Estaire	
Sudbury	Greater Sudbury	128.1	79.6	—	Highway 537 – Wanup, Wahnapitae	
Sudbury	Greater Sudbury	134.0	83.3	—	Estaire Road	Formerly Highway 69 south
Sudbury	Greater Sudbury	134.5	83.6	End of divided freeway		
Sudbury	Greater Sudbury	140.3	87.2		Highway 17 (SW & SE Bypasses) / TCH – Sault Ste. Marie, North Bay Municipal Road 46 north (Regent Street)	Interchange; Highway 69 northern terminus; continues as Municipal Road 46
1.000 mi = 1.609 km; 1.000 km = 0.621 mi: Closed/former; Route transition

Trans-Canada Highway
Previous route Highway 17	Highway 69	Next route Highway 400
