= Ontario Highway 529A =

Ontario provincial highway

Highway 529A

Route information
- Maintained by Ministry of Transportation of Ontario
- Length: 4.5 km (2.8 mi)
- Existed: 1961–present

Major junctions
- West end: Bayfield Lodge in Bayfield Inlet
- East end: Highway 529 at Manbert

Location
- Country: Canada
- Province: Ontario
- Counties: Parry Sound District
- Divisions: Parry Sound District
- Villages: Bayfield Inlet, Manbert

Highway system
- Ontario provincial highways; Current; Former; 400-series
← Highway 529	→ Highway 531

Secondary Highway 529A, commonly referred to as Highway 529A, is a provincially maintained secondary highway in the Canadian province of Ontario. Located within Parry Sound District, the highway is a short spur of Highway 529, extending from Manbert to Bayfield Inlet.

== Route description ==
Highway 529A is a short route with travels between Bayfield Inlet and Highway 529 at Manbert. The route begins at the entrance to Bayfield Lodge in the middle of Bayfield Inlet. It travels east along the north shore of the inlet before penetrating briefly into the forest, then emerging into a grassy knoll. Shortly thereafter it enters a shrubby grassland and zig-zags northeast and southeast, eventually transitioning into a thick forest. Occasionally, large granite outcroppings of the Canadian Shield create breaks in the growth. The route is 4.5 kilometres (2.8 mi) in length and features a narrow cross-section. On an average day in 2016, 160 vehicles travelled the highway.

== History ==
Highway 529A was the original route of Highway 529, which was designated in 1956. At that time, the present-day route of Highway 529 was the alignment of Highway 69. When Highway 69 was realigned through the area in 1960, the Highway 529 designation was transferred to the bypassed former alignment of Highway 69, while the former Highway 529 was redesignated as 529A. The route has remained unchanged since then.

== Major intersections ==
The following table lists the major junctions along Highway 529. The entirety of the route is located within Parry Sound District.

Location	km	Destinations	Notes
Bayfield Inlet	0.0		Bayfield Lodge
Manbert	4.5	Highway 529	
1.000 mi = 1.609 km; 1.000 km = 0.621 mi
