= Ontario Highway 526 =

Ontario provincial highway

Highway 526

Route information
- Maintained by Ministry of Transportation of Ontario
- Length: 3.9 km (2.4 mi)
- Existed: 1956–present

Major junctions
- West end: Britt post office
- East end: Highway 69 near Britt Station

Location
- Country: Canada
- Province: Ontario
- Divisions: Parry Sound District
- Villages: Britt

Highway system
- Ontario provincial highways; Current; Former; 400-series
← Highway 525	→ Highway 527

Secondary Highway 526, commonly referred to as Highway 526, is a provincially maintained secondary highway in the Canadian province of Ontario. It is a short and lightly travelled route that connects Highway 69 with the community of Britt.

== Route description ==
Highway 526 is a short route which provides access from the community of Britt to Highway 69. West of the community, the road is known as Riverside Drive. The route is lightly travelled, used by an average of 580 vehicles per day in 2007. It intersects Highway 69 three-fifths of the distance between Parry Sound and Sudbury.

The highway begins in the community of Britt, which was established at the head of Byng Inlet, the delta of the Magnetawan River as it flows into Georgian Bay. From the post office in the centre of the community, overlooking the inlet, the highway veers inland and travels northeast, paralleling the Still River. The river flows along the south side of the highway for most of its length; the occasional residence breaks the forests on the north side of the road. At Highway 69, the route passes beneath a concrete arch bridge and curves north. It intersects Highway 69 shortly thereafter.

== History ==
Highway 526 was first assumed by the Department of Highways in early 1956, along with several dozen other secondary highways, but was likely maintained as a development road prior to that. The route has not changed since that time.

== Future ==
The eastern terminus of Highway 526 is slated to be bypassed as Highway 400 is extended northwards from Nobel to Sudbury. The new freeway will lie nearly a kilometre east of the current alignment of Highway 69, and will feature interchanges 6 kilometres (3.7 mi) to the north near Still River, and 6 kilometres to the south at Highway 529.

== Major intersections ==
The following table lists the major junctions along Highway 526. The entirety of the route is located within Parry Sound District.

Location	km	Destinations	Notes
Britt	0.0		Highway terminates at post office
Henvey Township	3.9	Highway 69 – Sudbury	
1.000 mi = 1.609 km; 1.000 km = 0.621 mi
