= Estaire, Ontario =

Estaire
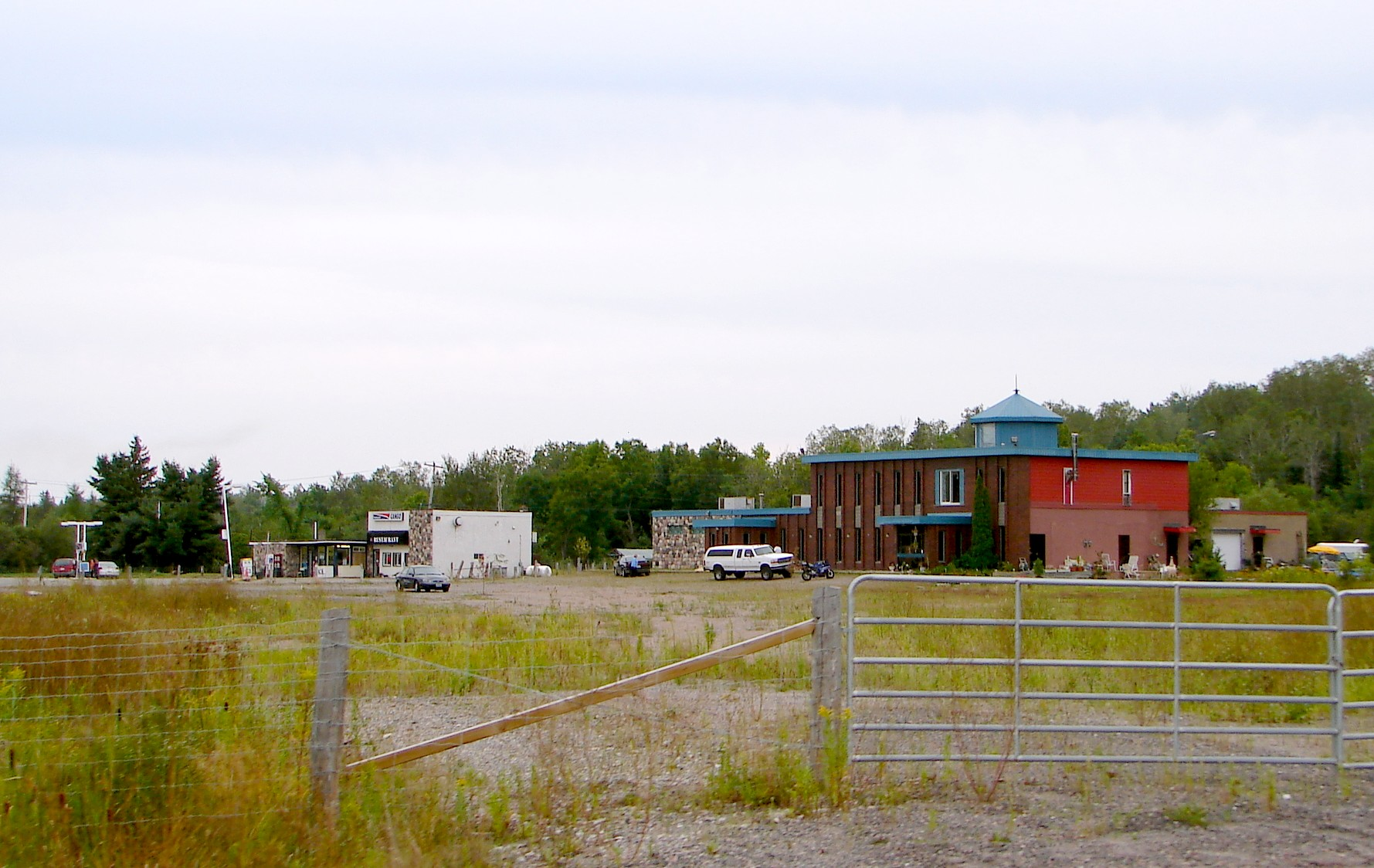

- Location of Estaire in Ontario
- Coordinates: 46°18′38″N 80°47′43″W
- Country: Canada
- Province: Ontario
- Region: Northeastern Ontario
- District: Sudbury
- Part: Sudbury, Unorganized, North
- Elevation: 229 m (751 ft)
- Time zone: UTC-5 (Eastern Time Zone)
  - Summer (DST): UTC-4 (Eastern Time Zone)
- FSA: P0M
- Area codes: 705, 249

Estaire is an unincorporated community in the Unorganized North Part of Sudbury District in Northeastern Ontario, Canada. It is located in geographic Burwash Township, approximately 5 kilometres (3 mi) south of the southern city limits of Greater Sudbury.

Estaire was formerly located directly along the route of Highway 69, but has been bypassed by a freeway, part of the extension of Ontario Highway 400, since November 13, 2009. The former alignment of Highway 69 extending southerly from Sudbury now has the street name Estaire Road, and the community's access to the freeway is by way of an interchange at Nelson Road. The opening of the new freeway reduced the number of highway travellers passing through the village, resulting in the closure of various local gas stations and restaurants due to decreased business.

The community has a modest residential population, but is primarily a recreational cottage country community. The nearby Lake Nepewassi is one of the region's most popular recreational lakes.
