= Ontario Highway 531 =

Ontario provincial highway

Highway 531

Route information
- Maintained by Ministry of Transportation of Ontario
- Length: 3.5 km (2.2 mi)
- Existed: 1956–present

Major junctions
- South end: Maple Road in Bonfield
- North end: Highway 17 – North Bay

Location
- Country: Canada
- Province: Ontario
- Districts: Nipissing District
- Villages: Bonfield

Highway system
- Ontario provincial highways; Current; Former; 400-series
← Highway 529A	→ Highway 532

Secondary Highway 531, commonly referred to as Highway 531, is a provincially maintained secondary highway in the Canadian province of Ontario. It connects Highway 17 east of North Bay with the community of Bonfield. The 3.5-kilometre (2.2 mi) route was established in 1956, and has remained the same since then. It passes through a forested area and has several private residences located along its length. Aside from Maple Road, its southern terminus, and Highway 17, its northern terminus, Highway 531 encounters no roads along its length.

== Route description ==
Highway 531 is a short highway east of North Bay which serves to connect the community of Bonfield with Highway 17, the Trans-Canada Highway. There are no other roads encountered along its length, aside from the termini. On an average day, 1300 vehicles travel the route, which is 3.5 kilometres (2.2 mi) long.

The highway begins at Maple Road north of the community of Bonfield, travelling north alongside a Canadian Pacific Railway (CPR) track, curving northeast with a vista of a large swamp on the Kaibuskong River. It follows parallel to the river for its entire length, but is not within sight of it aside from here. The highway enters a forest and diverges from the railway, curving north. From here to its northern terminus, residences dot both sides of the highway, with coniferous forests between them. The route curves back to the northeast and travels straight for 2 kilometres (1.2 mi), ending at Highway 17 next to a restaurant and motel.

== History ==
Highway 531 was first assumed by the Department of Highways in early 1956, along with several dozen other secondary highways, but was likely maintained as a development road prior to that. The route has not changed since that time.

== Major intersections ==
The following table lists the major junctions along Highway 531. The entirety of the route is located within Nipissing District.

Location	km	Destinations	Notes
Bonfield	0.0	Maple Road	
Bonfield	3.5	Highway 17 – North Bay	Trans-Canada Highway
1.000 mi = 1.609 km; 1.000 km = 0.621 mi
