= Henvey Township, Ontario =

Coordinates: 45.818°N 80.547°W

Henvey is an unorganized geographic township in the Canadian province of Ontario, located within the Parry Sound District. Part of the census subdivision of Unorganized Centre Parry Sound District, the township includes the communities of Britt Station and Still River. It formerly had larger boundaries, also including the ghost town of Key Harbour, although the more northerly section was transferred to the municipality of Killarney in the 1990s. Britt Station is part of the local services board of Britt and Byng Inlet.

The township is served by provincial highways 69 and 526.

== See also ==
- List of townships in Ontario
