= Naiscoutaing 17A =

- Indian reserve
- Naiscoutaing Indian Reserve No. 17A
- Location within Southern Ontario
- Coordinates: 45°40′N 80°29′W
- Country: Canada
- Province: Ontario
- District: Parry Sound
- First Nation: Shawanaga

Area
  - Land: 10.16 km^{2} (3.92 sq mi)

Naiscoutaing 17A is a First Nations reserve in Parry Sound District, Ontario. It is one of the reserves of the Shawanaga First Nation.
