= Mowat Township =

Unorganized township in Parry Sound District, Ontario

Coordinates: 45°55′19″N 80°26′02″W

Location of Mowat Township in Ontario

Mowat is an unorganized geographic township in the Canadian province of Ontario, located within the Parry Sound District. Part of the census subdivision of Unorganized Centre Parry Sound District, the township includes the communities of Bon Air, Cranberry and Key River, the ghost towns of Ludgate and Pakesley and the rail sidings of Mowat and Wanikewin.

The township is served by provincial highways 69 and 522. There is an Ontario Northland motor coach flag stop on Highway 69 at Key River, which is served by local buses on the Toronto–Barrie–Parry Sound–Sudbury corridor.

== See also ==
- List of townships in Ontario
