= Killbear Provincial Park =

Provincial park in Ontario, Canada

Killbear
- IUCN category II (national park)
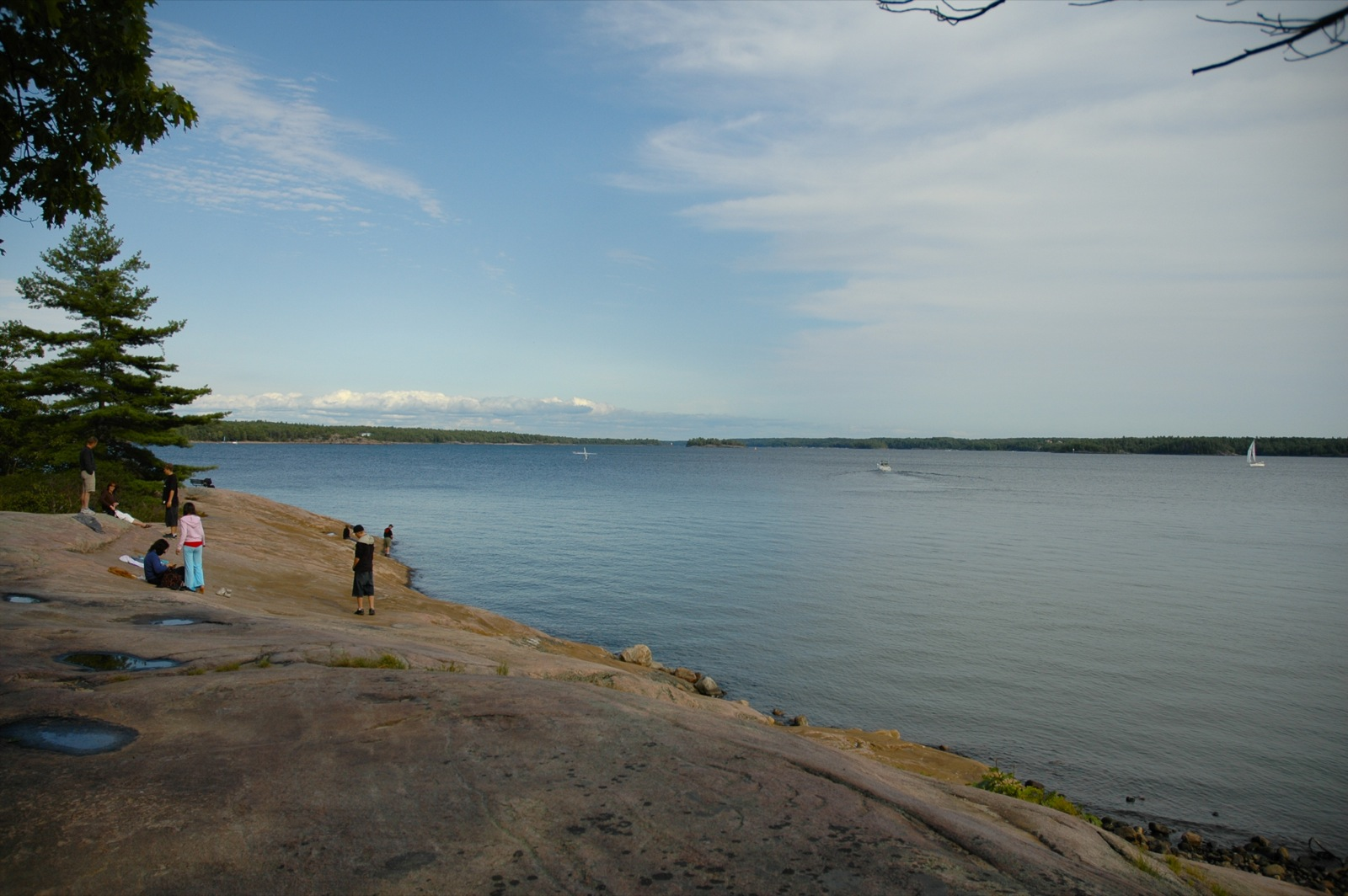
- Rock shoreline common to the area

- Location within Southern Ontario
- Interactive map of Killbear
- Location: Nobel, Ontario
- Nearest city: Parry Sound
- Coordinates: 45°21′35″N 80°13′11″W
- Area: 1,760 ha (6.8 sq mi)
- Established: 1960; 66 years ago
- Visitors: 300,000 (in 2019)
- Operator: Ontario Parks
- Website: www.ontarioparks.com/park/killbear

Killbear Provincial Park is a provincial park located on Georgian Bay in the Parry Sound District of Ontario, near the town of Nobel. Killbear is 1,760 acres and is located on Killbear Point. The park combines sandy beaches typical of the Great Lakes with the rock ridges and pines of the Canadian Shield. The park boundaries lie within the Georgian Bay Littoral UNESCO Biosphere Reserve.

== Nature and ecology ==
The park is ecologically significant for its large and varied types of shoreline. As water levels in the Great Lakes fluctuate over a time span of decades, different wetland, meadow and shoreline vegetation types are created. High levels of human activity can damage natural shoreline ecosystems; currently only small areas of natural beach remain intact in this park.

The wetlands of the park also support significant animal species including spotted turtles, Blanding's turtles and eastern massasauga rattlesnakes. Uplands support both the hognose snake and five-lined skink, both of which are considered species of special concern. There is also a population of fox snakes, which use offshore islands extensively, and overwinter in hibernacula in the area.

The southeastern portion of the park protects a typical area of bedrock barrens; these barrens represent a distinctive shallow soil habitat type found in eastern Georgian Bay. The park is one area within a larger significant landscape, the 30,000 islands along the eastern coast of Georgian Bay, which comprise the world's largest freshwater archipelago.

=== The Killbear Tree ===
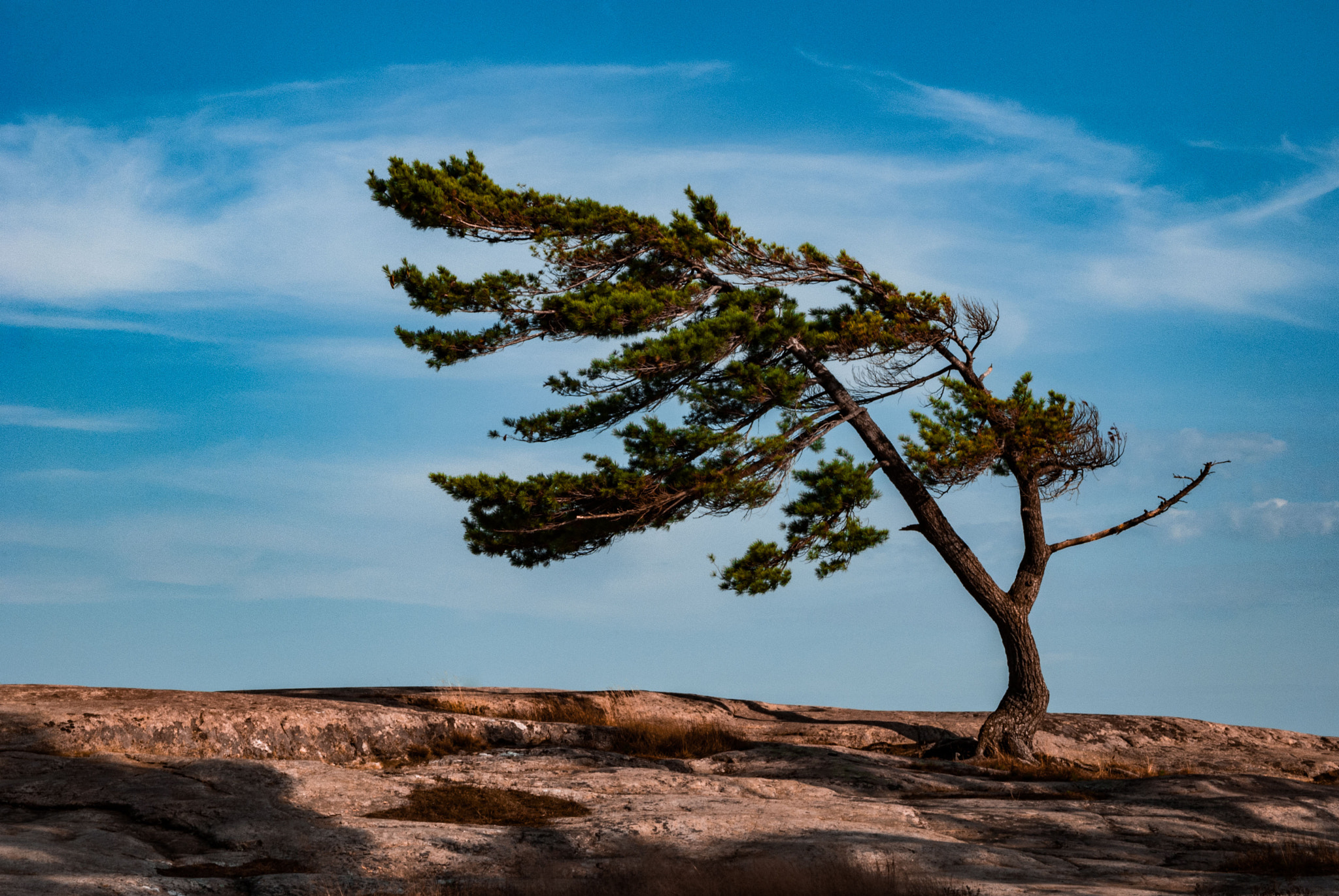
The Killbear Tree in 2017

Killbear Provincial Park features a "picture-perfect" windswept isolated white pine growing on a rock outcrop. In 2019, after a major limb died over two years, the tree began showing signs of damage. Following a major ice storm, the tree had two support rods installed in 2022.

== History ==
The area that is now Killbear Provincial Park was extensively logged for about 20 years, starting in 1900. The land was expropriated by the Ontario Government and designated a provincial park in 1960.

== Facilities and activities ==
The park is primarily used for camping, but other activities include swimming, boating, cycling and fishing. The park's proximity to southern Ontario make it very popular, especially in peak season, and reservations are often necessary despite its large number of campsites. The campgrounds are divided into campsites which are often focused on a feature such as a beach. They include: Beaver Dams, Blind Bay, Georgian, Granite Saddle, Harold Point, Kilcoursie Bay, and Lighthouse.
