= Magnetawan First Nation =

Indigenous reserve in Ontario, Canada

Magnetawan 1
- Indian reserve
- Magnetawan Indian Reserve No. 1
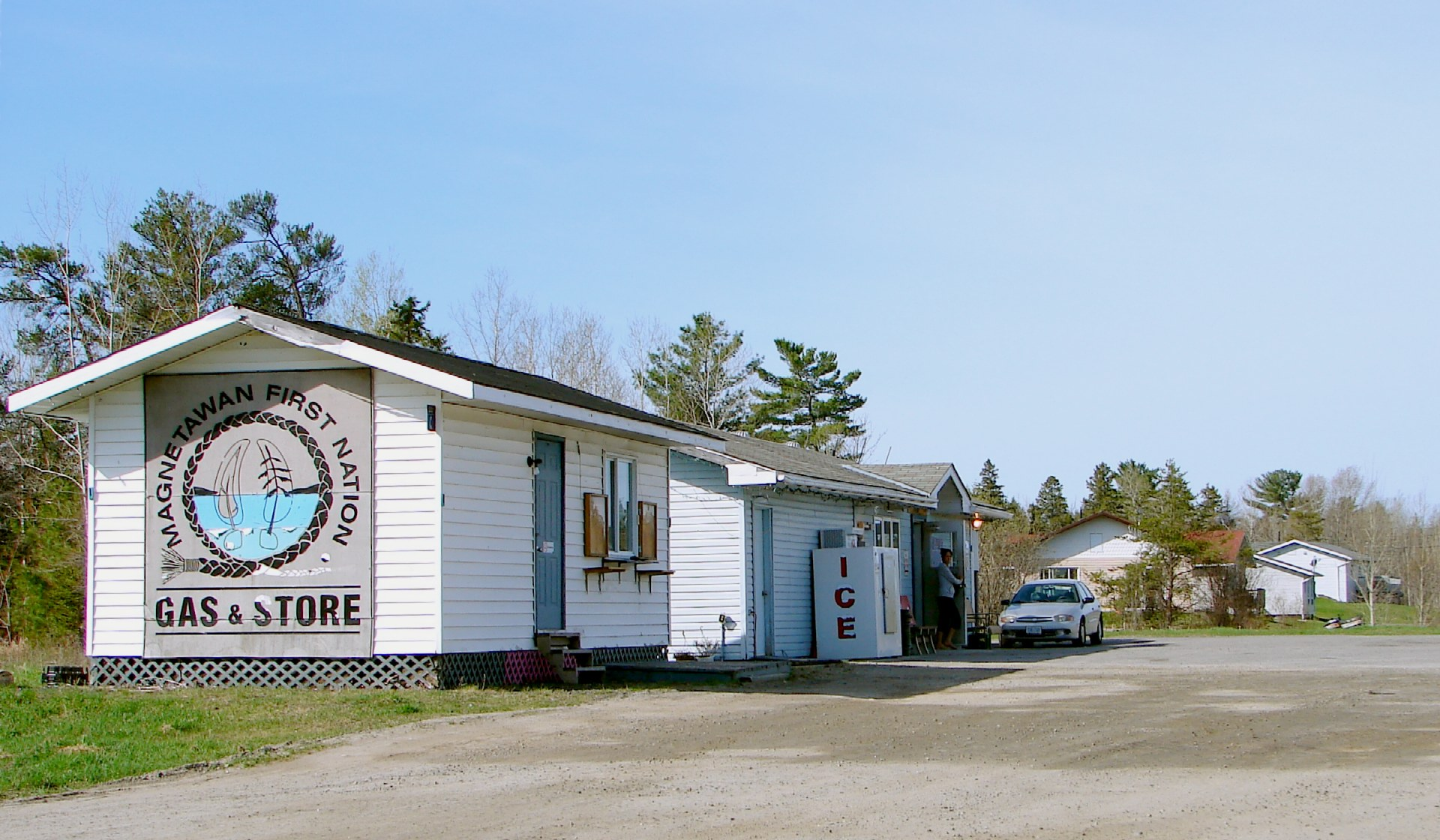
- Gas station on the reserve

- Location within Southern Ontario
- Coordinates: 45°45′N 80°28′W
- Country: Canada
- Province: Ontario
- District: Parry Sound
- First Nation: Magnetawan

Area
  - Land: 47.30 km^{2} (18.26 sq mi)

Population (2011)
  - Total: 93
  - Density: 2/km^{2} (5.2/sq mi)

Magnetawan First Nation (Ojibwe: Magnetawan Atik Anishnaabe) is an Ojibwe First Nation community in Ontario, Canada. The community is situated on reserve lands in Britt, Ontario.

== Magnetawan Indian Reserve No. 1 ==
Magnetawan No. 1 is a First Nation reserve 6 km east of Georgian Bay, south of Sudbury, Ontario, with an area of 47 km^{2}, occupied by the Magnetawan First Nation, an Ojibwe band. As of 2008/2009, its resident registered population is 233; 92 band members live on the reserve. Although the mother tongue is Ojibwe, English is the most commonly spoken.
