= The Archipelago =

- Township (single-tier)
- Township of The Archipelago
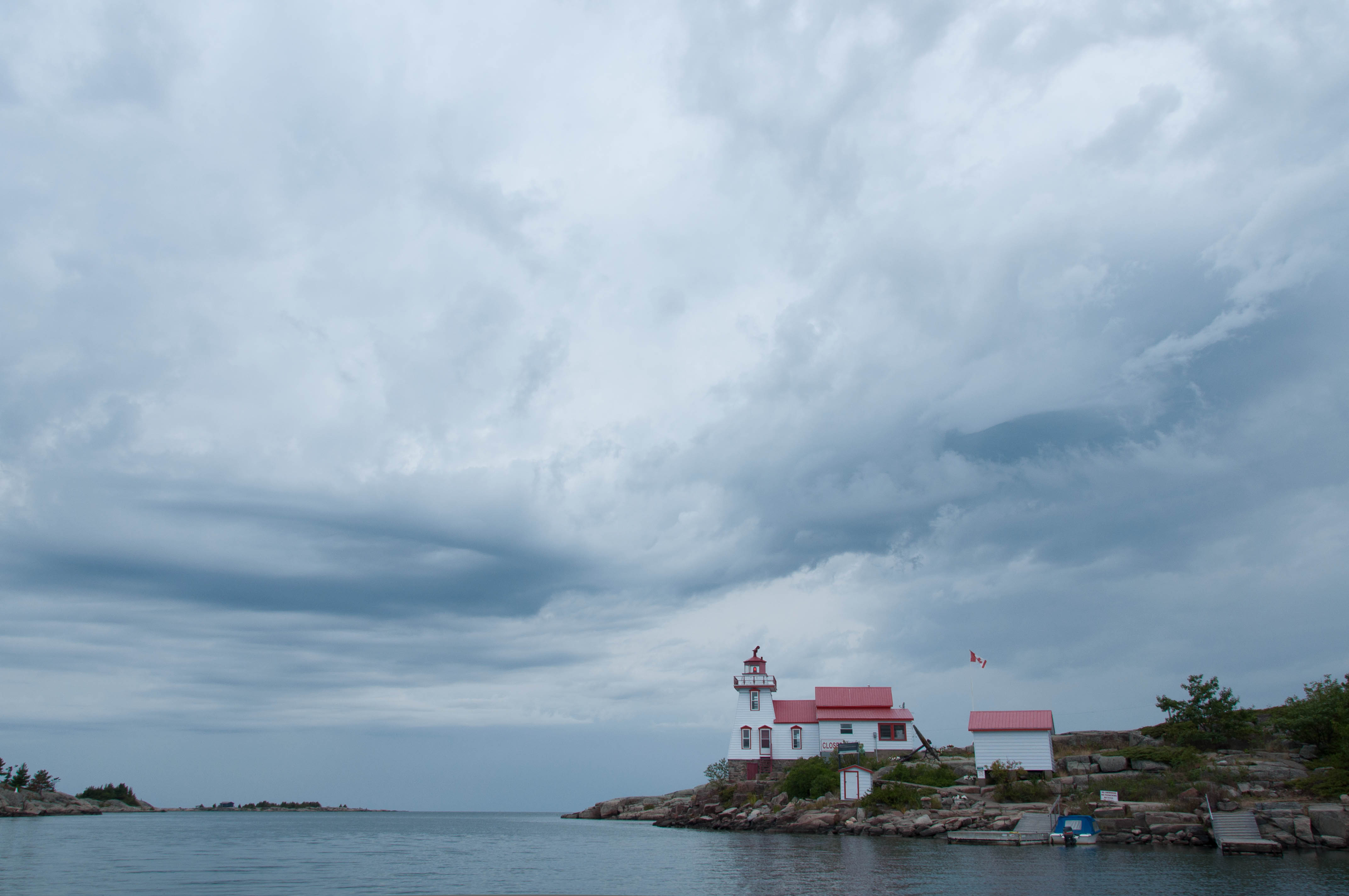
- Pointe au Baril Lighthouse

- Location within Southern Ontario
- Coordinates: 45°35′N 80°23′W
- Country: Canada
- Province: Ontario
- District: Parry Sound
- Incorporated: 1980

Government
  - Type: Township
  - Reeve: Bert Liverance
  - Fed. riding: Parry Sound-Muskoka
  - Prov. riding: Parry Sound—Muskoka

Area
  - Land: 592.14 km^{2} (228.63 sq mi)

Population (2021)
  - Total: 979
  - Density: 1.7/km^{2} (4.4/sq mi)
- Time zone: UTC-5 (EST)
  - Summer (DST): UTC-4 (EDT)
- Area code: 705
- Website: www.thearchipelago.on.ca

The Archipelago is a township in central Ontario, Canada, along the Georgian Bay in the Parry Sound District.

== Geography ==
The municipality consists of two non-contiguous parts, separated by Carling and the Parry Sound. The northern part includes the village of Pointe au Baril on the mainland and most of the geographic townships of Shawanaga and Harrison. This covers the islands and shoreline of Georgian Bay from the Twin Sisters (at the northern boundary of Carling Township) north to Charles Inlet and the Naiscoot River, a few miles south of Britt. The southern part consists of the geographic townships of Cowper and Conger that includes the islands and shoreline of Georgian Bay southwest of Parry Sound, from Twelve Mile Bay (at the District of Muskoka boundary) to Wasauksing First Nation and up the South Channel almost to the town of Parry Sound. Almost a third of the population of the southern part lives on the islands in the Sans Souci and Copperhead area, centred on Frying Pan Island.

The township is characterized by numerous islands (hence its name) and bays that attract large numbers of vacationers and boaters in the summer. Much of its area is undeveloped and crown-owned land: in the north, 96 percent of the mainland and 50 percent of the islands remain in the public domain, and in the south, 83 percent of the mainland and 70 percent of the islands, a large part of it protected in The Massasauga Provincial Park.

=== Communities ===
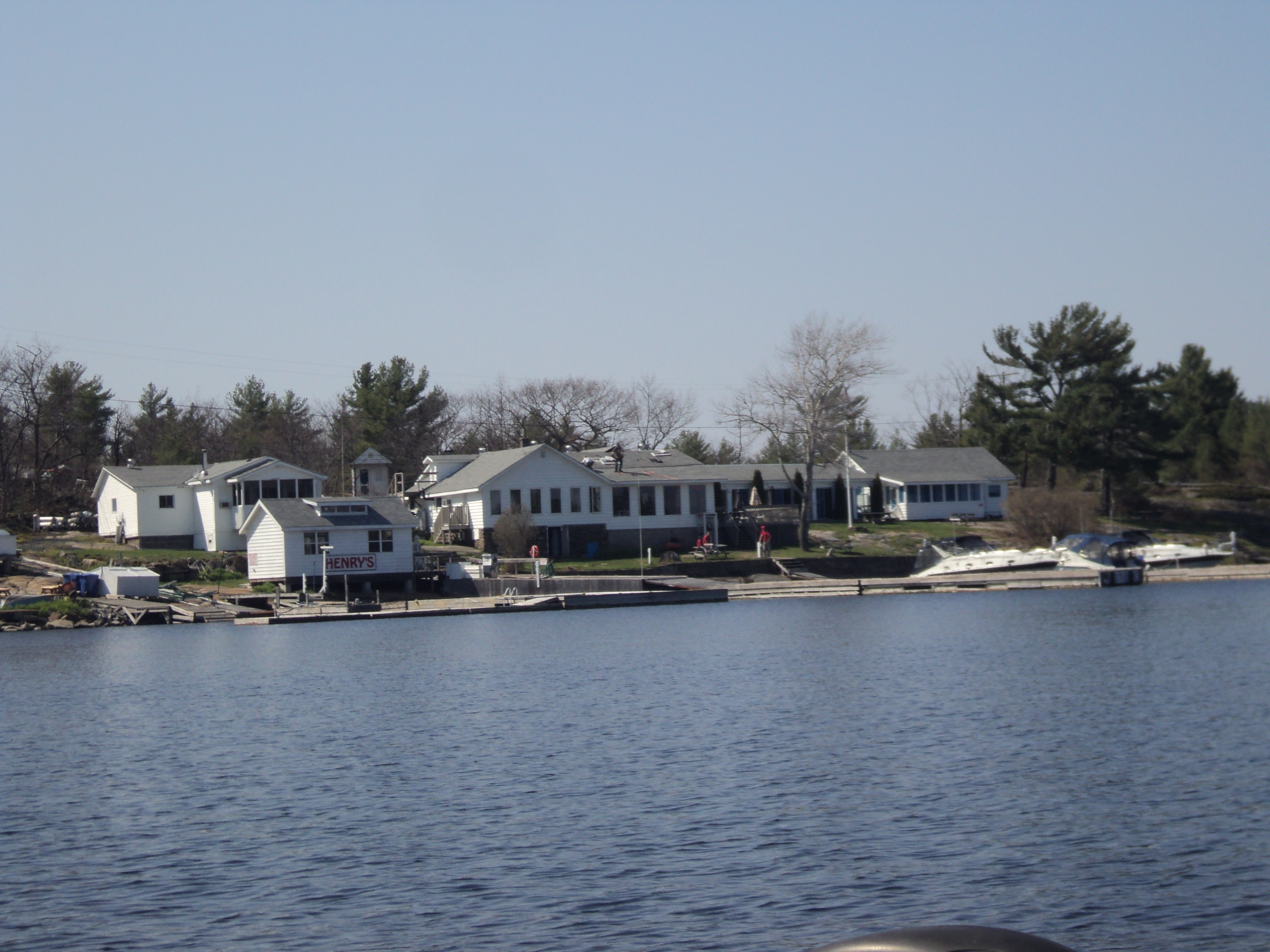
Henry's Fish and Chips, on Frying Pan Island, Sans Souci, Ontario.

- Bayfield Inlet
- Blackstone Lake
- Copperhead
- Five Mile Bay
- Georgian Inlet
- Manbert
- Manitou Dock
- Naiscoot
- Nares Inlet
- Niweme
- Ojibway Island
- Pointe au Baril
- Pointe au Baril Station
- Sans Souci
- Seven Mile Narrows
- Skerryvore
- Woods Bay

== History ==
On January 1, 1980, the townships of Georgian Bay South Archipelago and Georgian Bay North Archipelago were formed out of unincorporated geographic townships from the Parry Sound District, primarily in order to provide proper planning in the islands and waterways of the area. These two townships were intended to be set up as one municipality, but the Ontario Legislature created two townships, with a provision for their later amalgamation, if requested by the elected Councils. Soon after the formation of the townships, both councils passed identical by-laws calling for the amalgamation of the two municipalities. Therefore, the Township of the Archipelago was formed on April 1, 1980, when the townships of Georgian Bay South Archipelago and Georgian Bay North Archipelago merged.

== Demographics ==
In the 2021 Census of Population conducted by Statistics Canada, The Archipelago had a population of 979 living in 497 of its 2,863 total private dwellings, a change of 84.4% from its 2016 population of 531. With a land area of 592.14 km^{2} (228.63 sq mi), it had a population density of 1.7/km^{2} (4.3/sq mi) in 2021.

Canada census – The Archipelago community profile

	2021	2016	2011
Population	979 (+84.4% from 2016)	531 (-6.2% from 2011)	566 (-1.7% from 2006)
Land area	592.14 km^{2} (228.63 sq mi)	606.14 km^{2} (234.03 sq mi)	606.56 km^{2} (234.19 sq mi)
Population density	1.7/km^{2} (4.4/sq mi)	0.9/km^{2} (2.3/sq mi)	0.9/km^{2} (2.3/sq mi)
Median age	60.4 (M: 61.2, F: 59.2)	58.5 (M: 58.4, F: 58.6)
Private dwellings	2,863 (total) 497 (occupied)	2,693 (total)	3,008 (total)
Median household income	$83,000	$67,712

References: 2021 2016 2011

Historical census populations – The Archipelago

Year	Pop.	±%
1976	575	—
1981	670	+16.5%
1986	583	−13.0%
1991	720	+23.5%
1996	555	−22.9%

Year	Pop.	±%
2001	505	−9.0%
2006	576	+14.1%
2011	566	−1.7%
2016	531	−6.2%
2021	979	+84.4%

Source: Statistics Canada

Mother tongue (2021):

- English as first language: 92.9%
- French as first language: 1.5%
- English and French as first languages: 0.5%
- Other as first language: 4.6%

== Education ==
The community is within the Near North District School Board.

As of 1975, Moon Island, within The Archipelago, was served by the Sugar Bay School. That year, it was one of 21 one-room schools in the province, and there were 12 students in grades 1-8 with ages ranging from 6 to 13. At the time, the closest high school to Moon Island was in Parry Sound, 19 miles (31 km) away from Moon Island. Moon Island residents who attended high school lived with relatives living in Parry Sound or stayed at boarding houses during the school year.

== See also ==
- List of municipalities in Ontario
- List of townships in Ontario
