= Whitney and Opeongo Railway =

Former logging railway in Ontario, Canada

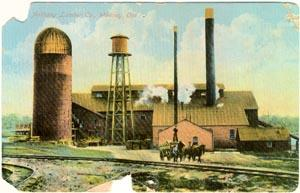
The rail switch yard at St. Anthony Lumber was the southern end of the W&OR.

The Whitney and Opeongo Railway (W&OR) was a logging railway in Ontario, Canada. It ran from Opeongo Lake to Whitney, where it connected to the Canada Atlantic Railway (CAR), running a total distance of about 14 miles (23 km). It opened in 1902 and closed in the 1920s with the end of major logging operations in the area.

The southern end of the former route was taken over as the basis of Ontario Highway 60 for a section west of Whitney in Algonquin Park, while the northern end to Opeongo Lake is now used as a park access road. Only a short section of the original railbed is no longer used, abandoned when the highway was constructed further west.

== History ==
The line was built by the St. Anthony Lumber Company, who set up sawmill operations in the Whitney area starting in 1894. The mill was a major stop on the CAR, (Note: The CAR was known as the Ottawa, Arnprior and Parry Sound Railway until 1899, when its operations merged with other lines further east.) with an extensive switch yard extending on the south side of town along the east bank of Galeairy Lake.

Construction of the W&OR by the Ottawa contractor Thomas McLaughlin began in May or June 1902. The line was completed in November 1902 at the relatively high cost of $200,000 due to a number of rock cuts. It entered service in June 1903. The railway was heralded as a "revolution" in the lumber industry, reducing the time to get logs to the mills to twenty-four hours, where it used to take as long as six months. (Note: Normally logs were floated along rivers to the mills, which could only happen when the rivers weren't frozen over and had enough water. Any cuts from the autumn generally had to wait until spring.)

The northern end of the line connected to the southern end of Opeongo Lake, one of the largest lakes in the area, allowing timber to be floated to that point from a wide area across the center of the park area. It replaced a river-based route that was some 50 miles long and took days to traverse. The line was fairly active, and by 1904 the company was running four trains a day carrying a total of 2,000 logs.

The mill was purchased by the Munn Lumber company in 1910, itself recently purchased by James Brockett Tudhope, to supply hardwood to his furniture company in Orillia. Munn became infamous for their clearcutting of Algonquin Park, and caused a serious backlash when they proposed to cut around the Highland Inn. In response, the Department of Lands, Forests and Mines purchased Munn for $290,000 and closed down its operations.

The Whitney mill was sold to Dennis Canadian in the winter of 1912/13, who continued to use the line periodically into the 1920s. The company closed operations in 1922, and the town lost its only source of power when the millstock burned down in 1923. The line was officially abandoned in 1926. With the construction of Highway 60 beginning in the 1930s, the railbed provided a convenient route during construction.

In 1905 the CAR was purchased by the Grand Trunk Railway and thus became part of Canadian National Railways (CN) in the 1920s. In 1933 the CAR was severed between Two Rivers and Algonquin Park Station when a trestle washed out, reportedly due to the construction of a beaver dam. By this time traffic on the line was too low to justify rebuilding the bridge, and the line operated as two separate sections. Service west of Whitney to Two Rivers ended on 31 December 1946 and the rails were lifted in the summer of 1952. This gave the W&OR wye at Whitney a new life as the main turnaround point for trains on the eastern end of the CAR. Services along the entire CAR route finally ended in the 1960s.

== Route ==
Route data from Canadian Rail and matched on the Ontario Ministry of Natural Resources and Forestry Topographical Map Service.

The line started in Whitney, running northwest out of town to pass between Whitney Lake and West Smith Lake. It then ran almost due north to Little McCauley Lake before turning almost due west to Costello Lake. On the western side of Costello it turned north-northwest until ending at Sproule Bay, the southernmost point on Opeongo Lake.

Highway 60 follows the original route out of Whitney until it reaches West Smith Lake, where the highway continues northwestward, around Brewer Lake, and then rejoins the original route for a short distance to Costello. The highway then turns west-southwest and leaves the area. The section northwest of Costello is now used as the Opeongo Road.

== See also ==
- Egan Estates Railway, a similar logging railway a short distance to the east of the W&OR.
