= Nobel, Ontario =

Village in Ontario, Canada

Coordinates: 45°25′N 80°06′W

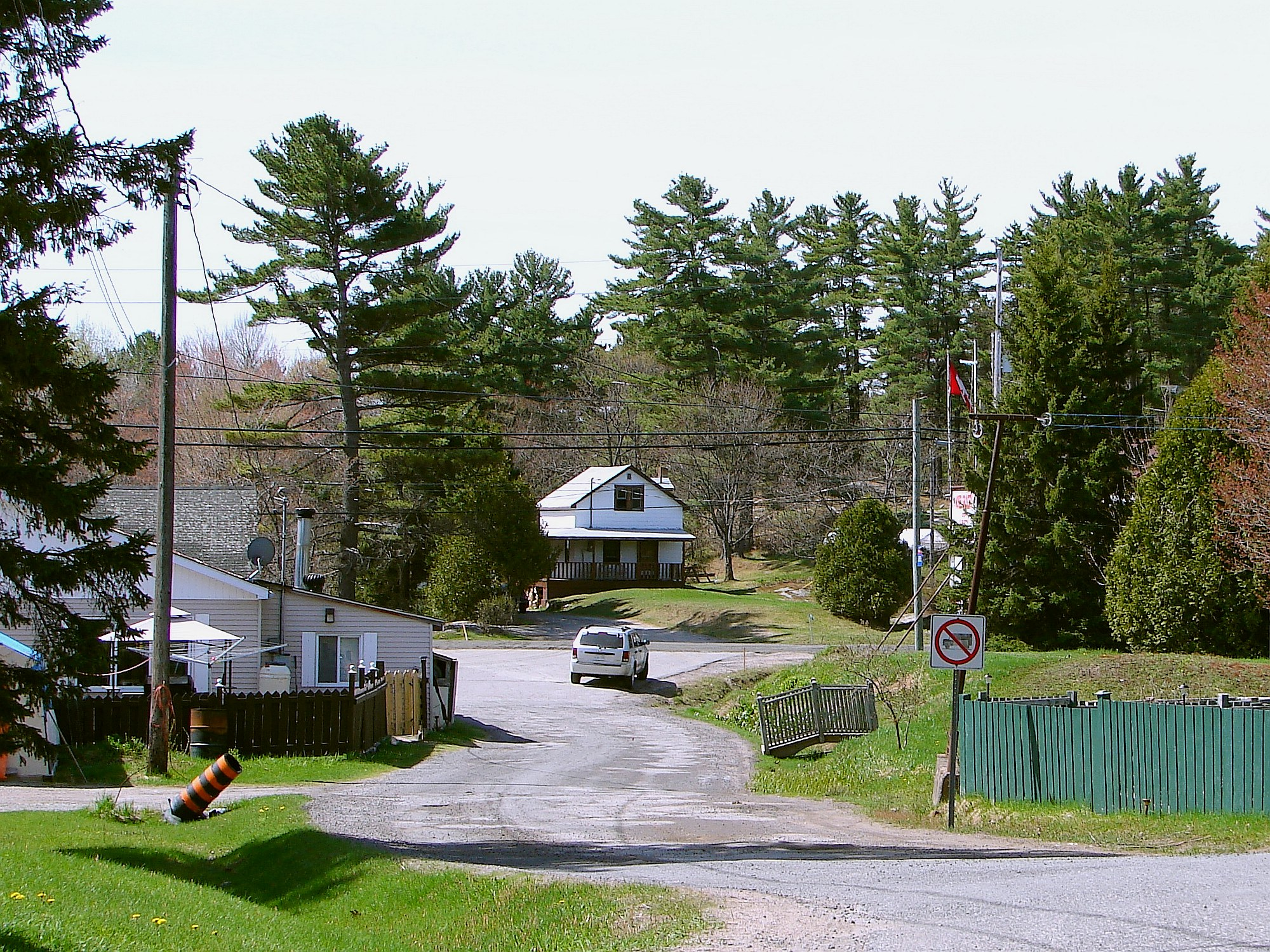

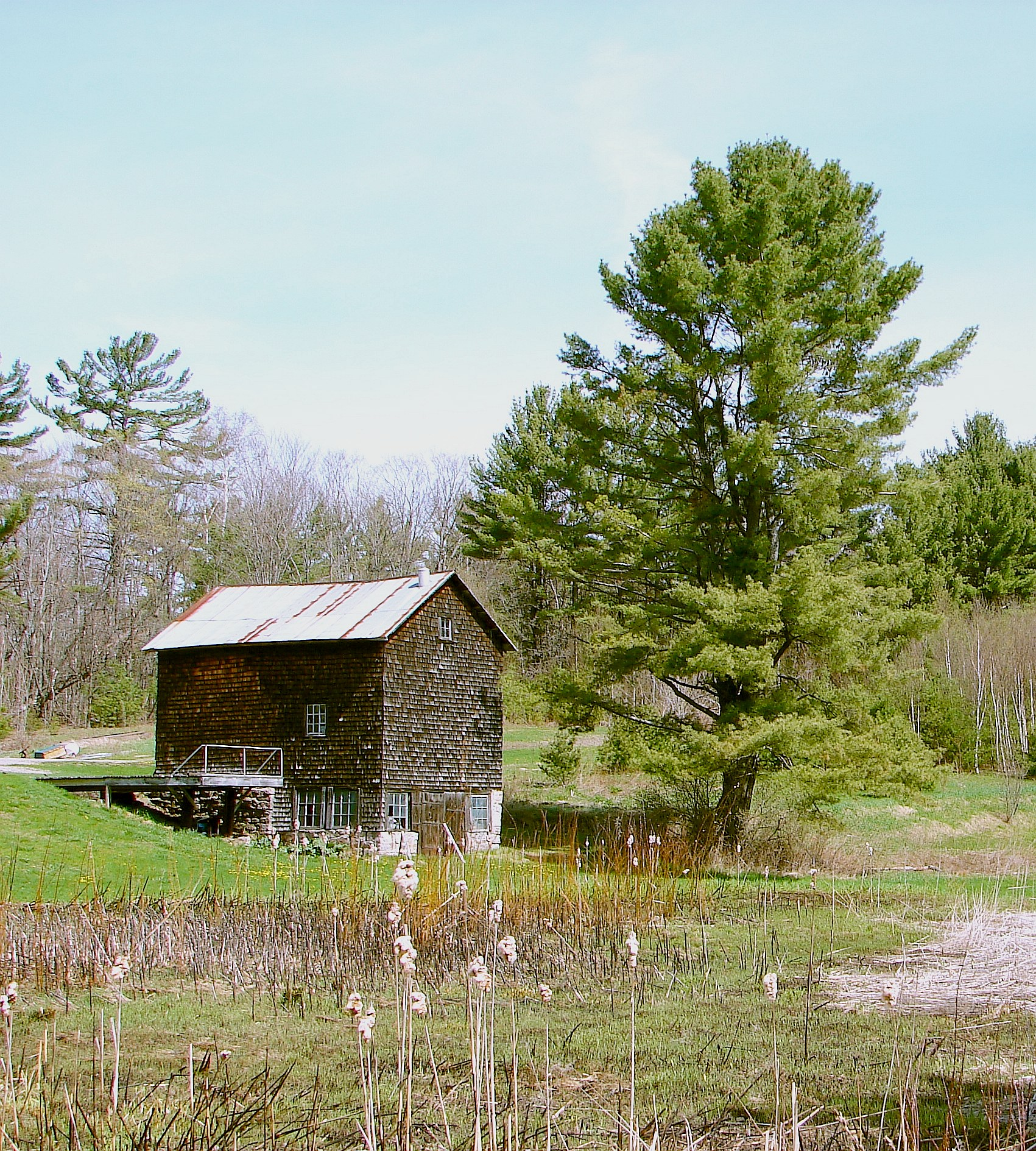

Nobel is a village on the shores of Parry Sound, Ontario, Canada. It is in the Municipality of McDougall in the District of Parry Sound. The community is named after Alfred Nobel, the inventor of dynamite.

This village is the administrative office of the Shawanaga First Nation reserve.

== History ==
Nobel was across the Sound from Depot Harbour; the two towns benefited from the industrialization brought by the Ottawa, Arnprior and Parry Sound Railway, later the Canada Atlantic Railway.

During the First World War, Nobel was the home of two explosives factories: The British Cordite Limited and Canadian Explosives Ltd. Both sites closed in 1922. Explosives and munitions were also produced at Nobel in World War II.

=== The British Cordite Ltd, Nobel, Ontario ===
The British Cordite Limited was built by the Explosives Department of the Imperial Munitions Board to produce Cordite. Construction started in late 1916 and production started in mid 1917. The site covered 366 acres (1.48 km^{2}) and had 155 buildings. By 30 November 1918 it had produced 21,450,000 lbs (9,738,300 kg) of Cordite.

=== Canadian Explosives Ltd ===
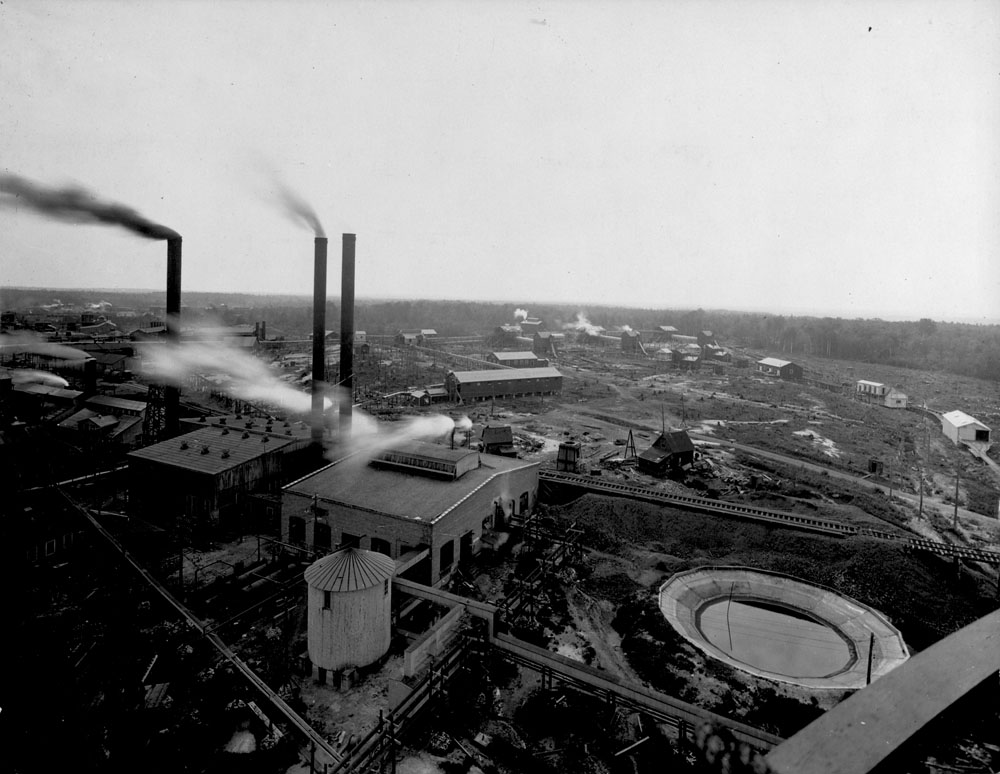
Bird’s-eye view of a portion of Canadian Explosives Ltd., Nobel, Ontario

Canadian Explosives, jointly owned by du Pont, in the USA, and Nobel's Explosives, in Scotland, were already producing Cordite, at Beloeil, for the Quebec Arsenal, before World War I. The capacity of this plant was increased one-hundredfold to 350,000 lbs (159,000 kg) of Cordite per month. In addition, in February 1918, they started to build a Cordite plant at Nobel to produce 1,500,000 lbs (681,000 kg) per month. It was finished on 24 August 1918. During peak production 1,000 people were employed, many of them women.

=== World War 2 ===
At the outbreak of WW2, Defence Industries Limited was founded next to CIL. The plants were operated around the clock and employed 2,000 persons. A typical wage for the winter of 1942-43, for an employee to blend cordite and pack it for shipment to munitions plants elsewhere, was 52 cents per hour.

=== Orenda Aerospace ===
In the post-war years Orenda Engines had a testing facility, where the Orenda Iroquois turbojet engine was being developed. This engine was slated to power the ill-fated Avro Arrow until the project was cancelled by the Diefenbaker government.

=== Highway 400 realignment ===
In 2010, a stretch of the new Highway 400 alignment opened up which now bypasses Nobel. Some businesses in the town were affected by the new highway due to a sharp decline in traffic and customers, and had to close down. The former route of Highway 69 through the town was renamed as Nobel Road and reduced in width from four to two lanes, with the decommissioned lanes converted into a recreational trail.

A new access road for nearby access to Exit 236 of Highway 400 was built, and named Avro Arrow Road.
