= Rock Lake (Algonquin Park) =

Lake in Algonquin Park, Ontario, Canada

- Looking south from Picto Bay

- Location of Rock Lake in Southern Ontario
- Location: Haliburton County, Ontario, Canada
- Coordinates: 45°50′00″N 78°40′00″W
- Primary inflows: Madawaska River South Madawaska River Louisa Creek Rock Creek
- Primary outflows: Madawaska River
- Surface area: 5 km^{2} (1.9 sq mi)
- Average depth: 7.9 m (26 ft)
- Max. depth: 34.7 m (114 ft)
- Surface elevation: 391 m (1,283 ft)
- Islands: Rose I., Jean I., Third I.

Rock Lake is a lake located in Algonquin Provincial Park in Haliburton County, Ontario, Canada.

Rock Lake features a campground with 121 sites at the north end of the lake, which is accessible from Highway 60 via a gravel road. Algonquin Park also maintains about 20 designated campsites around the lake that are accessible by boat as well as several portages to neighbouring lakes. The lake is popular with canoeists and kayakers. Motorboats are permitted with a limit of 20 horsepower. About 20 cottages on long-term leases are found on the shores of Rock Lake. The 5 km Booth's Rock hiking trail overlooks the Lake. The Madawaska River flows into Rock Lake from the north and out of it in the southeast. The South Madawaska River enters Rock Lake from a long bay in the southwest.

== History ==
As part of the Ottawa River watershed, Rock Lake lies in the traditional territory of the Algonquin people. Pictographs, petroglyphs and archaeological evidence all bear witness to early activity on and near its shores. There is historical and archeological evidence of indigenous farming at Rock Lake in the 1870s.

Logging in the area began in the mid-1800s. In the winter of 1891-1892 a survey party plotted a railway route along the east shore of Rock Lake. In 1896, the Ottawa, Arnprior and Parry Sound Railway was completed by J.R. Booth. Rock Lake Station, including a water pump and tower, was built near the north shore of the lake where the rail line crossed Rock Creek. While the main impetus for the rail line was the transportation of lumber and grain, from early on, it also served to bring passengers to the area for recreation, particularly after the construction of the Highland Inn and other lodges in Algonquin Park in 1908.

The railway owned 30 acres of land in the vicinity of the station, and by 1910, there were several buildings, including the station building, section house, a grocery store and several homes. From 1927 to 1935, a small school operated in the settlement.

A commercial hotel was never built on Rock Lake along the lines of those on Cache Lake, Lake of Two Rivers or Smoke Lake, but family members of J.R. Booth did build a substantial summer home on a point on the east shore. Named Men-Wah-Tay lodge by its owners, referred to in Algonquin Park literature as the Barclay Estate, it was designed by John W.H. Watts and completed by 1900. The estate was initially owned by Booth's daughter, Helen Gertrude, and her husband Andrew Fleck and sold in 1935 to Helen's daughter Jean Barclay. The main house was expanded, and tennis courts and a large boathouse were added. The estate had its own railway siding and station.

In 1911, Algonquin Park was expanded to include Nightingale Township and thus Rock Lake. This did not result in many immediate changes. Most buildings comprising the Rock Lake Station community were on railway lands, which were not turned over to the park until 1915. Tourists had already been coming for camping and fishing since the railway opened, and logging in the area continued much as it had before it was incorporated into the park.

As part of efforts to promote tourism in Algonquin Park, leases were offered for fishing camps and summer cottages. Around Rock Lake, new leases were granted from the early 1920s up until 1954. At their peak in the late 1950s, there were about 40 cottages.

In the early 1930s, train service to Rock Lake became less frequent, finally ending around 1945. In 1937, Highway 60 was completed through Algonquin Park, though the road connecting Rock Lake to the highway was not built until 1946.

The public campground was opened shortly after road access was established and expanded in 1955, after numerous cottages were demolished. The Barclay Estate was demolished the same year.
