= Parry Sound Colonization Railway =

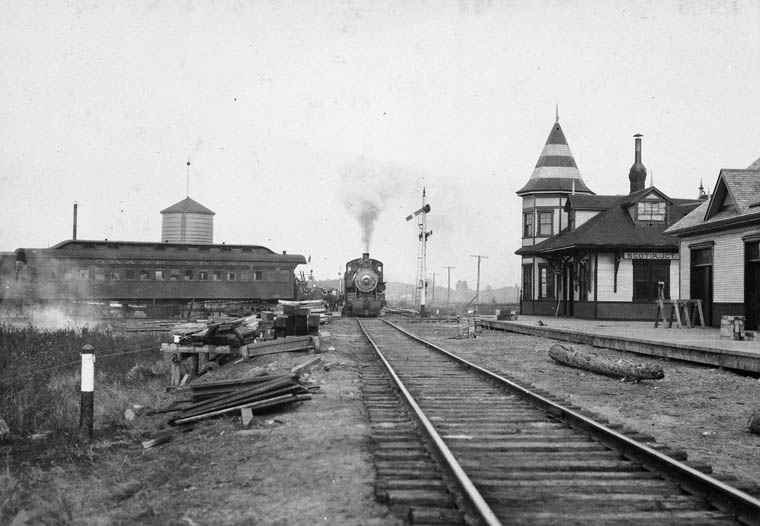
Scotia Junction, Parry Township, circa 1909) where work was begun on the PSCR in 1886. National Archives of Canada

The Parry Sound Colonization Railway Company (PSCR) was a Canadian railway that operated in Ontario. It originally intended to connect the town of Parry Sound to the Northern and Pacific Junction Railway but ran out of funds shortly after starting construction. The line was purchased by John Rudolphus Booth in 1892 to form the western end of his Ottawa, Arnprior and Parry Sound Railway. Failing to come to an agreement on the location of an associated port, the line ultimately bypassed the town completely, running to Depot Harbour, a company town.

== History ==
The PSCR was formed in 1884 by the citizens of Parry Sound with the intention of encouraging a railway line to be built to the community.

On January 16, 1886, a public meeting was called in Parry Sound regarding a proposed railway line.

On February 5, 1886, a deputation waited upon the Ontario Government to ask for a subsidy to aid in construction of a line to Parry Sound. The Parry Sound line was described as being an important feeder for the Northern and Pacific Junction Railway (N&PJR), which was under construction at that time from Gravenhurst to Callander. The PSCR was to be built from Parry Sound in an easterly direction to connect with the N&PJR near Burks Falls. Beginning at Scotia Junction some work was done as far as Bear Lake before construction was halted due to lack of funds.

In 1892 the PSCR was acquired by Ottawa lumberman J.R. Booth and merged with his Ottawa, Arnprior & Parry Sound Railway which was being built from Ottawa to Georgian Bay. When Booth selected Depot Harbour as the western terminus of his railway, the citizens of Parry Sound felt betrayed.

Following acquisition of the PSCR by Booth, the locomotive from his Nosbonsing & Nipissing Railway was used for construction of this line, west of Bear Lake, during the winter months when that line was shut down for the season.

== See also ==
- List of Ontario railways
- List of defunct Canadian railways
