= Egan Estates Railway =

Overview
- Headquarters: Ottawa
- Locale: Ontario, Canada
- Dates of operation: 1885–

Technical
- Track gauge: 4 ft 8 1/2 in (1,435 mm) standard gauge
- Length: ~15 miles (24 km)

The Egan Estates Railway, also known as the McCauley Central Railway, was a private logging railway in central Ontario, Canada. It ran northwest off the Ottawa, Arnprior and Parry Sound Railway (OA&PS) from a junction about 4.5 miles (7.2 km) northwest of the town of Madawaska. The line originally ran about 5 miles (8.0 km) to McCauley Lake, but was later extended another 10 miles (16 km) into the bush near Kitty Lake.

== History ==
The line was built by lumber baron John Rudolphus Booth, who also built the OA&PS. The line is named for John Egan, the owner of 250 square miles of land in today's Algonquin Provincial Park. Egan had developed the land by opening several "depot farms" that sold produce to the workers in the surrounding areas.

Egan died in 1854, and after lying relatively unused for some time, Booth purchased the 650 square kilometer estate in 1867. He built the current town of Madawaska on the southeast corner of the plot, centralizing development in the area, which had formerly seen only a few plots from settlers travelling into the area on the Opeongo Road. Construction of the OA&PS took place between 1885 and 1896 and the Egan Estates Railway was built sometime during this period. Madawaska became the divisional point for the OA&PS, and a large lumber yard was constructed there.

As the logging areas in the present Algonquin Park were used up, the work focused more on the Madawaska area, and Booth moved to the town. With the abandonment of the Nosbonsing and Nipissing Railway (N&N) in 1912, another of Booth's lumber railways, the N&N charter was used for the Egan Estates, although it was rarely referred to this way.

The Madawaska area was also logged out by the 1920s, which combined with the effects of World War I and the Great Depression, led to a crash in the square log market. The OA&PS ran a train every 15 minutes at its peak, with 4 passenger trains a day, but by 1926 this was down to 1 to 2 trains a week. During the 1930s, much of the Egan Estates line was lifted and shipped out, along with much of the OA&PS infrastructure in Madawaska.

== Route ==
The starting point for the Egan Estates Railway was a branch point northwest of the town of Madawaska, Egan Estates Junction. The OA&PS runs west-northwest through town, bending slowly northward to skirt the northern edge of a line of high hills and then turning westward and finally southwest when it meets the Madawaska River to the west of the town. The branch point wyed off to the west, crossing the Madawaska and then following the modern path of McCauley Lake Road.

When trees in this area were used up, the end section of the line was lifted and re-laid and extended running northward from a point just short of McCauley Lake. This follows the modern Major Lake Road, continuing past its current end to pass between Billy Lake and Oran Creek, crossing the Opeonogo River east of Farm Lake, and then turning westward to end in the bush between Kitty Lake and Farm Lake. The original route has been mostly reused for access roads. The endpoint, "End of Steel", now features the rentable Kitty Lake Ranger Cabin, built using materials from the original logging camp.
