= Canada Atlantic Railway =

North American railway

Overview
- Headquarters: Ottawa, Ontario, Canada
- Locale: Ontario, Quebec, Vermont
- Dates of operation: 1879–1914

Technical
- Track gauge: 4 ft 8 1/2 in (1,435 mm) standard gauge

The Canada Atlantic Railway (CAR) was a North American railway located in Ontario, southwestern Quebec and northern Vermont. It connected Georgian Bay on Lake Huron with the northern end of Lake Champlain via Ottawa. It was formed in 1879 through a merger of two separate railway companies that John Rudolphus Booth had purchased, and reached its full extent in 1899 through a third company that he had created. The CAR was owned by Booth for several years after its completion until he agreed to sell it to the Grand Trunk Railway (GTR) in 1904.

For a short time at the end of the 19th century the CAR handled up to 40% of the grain traffic from Lake Huron; this was due to a combination of factors including the advent of the grain boom on the Canadian Prairies and prior to the construction of the Canadian Northern Railway's transcontinental line across Ontario, as well as prior to the opening of the Fourth Welland Canal.

The CAR continued as a separate GTR-owned subsidiary from 1905 until 1914 when its operations were fully merged into the GTR. The GTR encountered financial difficulty during and after the First World War and was dissolved and its assets merged into the Canadian National Railways (CN) in 1923. Today remnants of the CAR continue as either active rail lines for CN or Via Rail. Some abandoned CAR rail lines have been converted into rail trails.

== Route ==
The CAR comprised the following lines, west to east:

- Ottawa, Arnprior and Parry Sound Railway (OA&PS)
- Montreal and City of Ottawa Junction Railway (M&OJ)
- Coteau and Province Line Railway and Bridge Company (C&PL)

== History ==
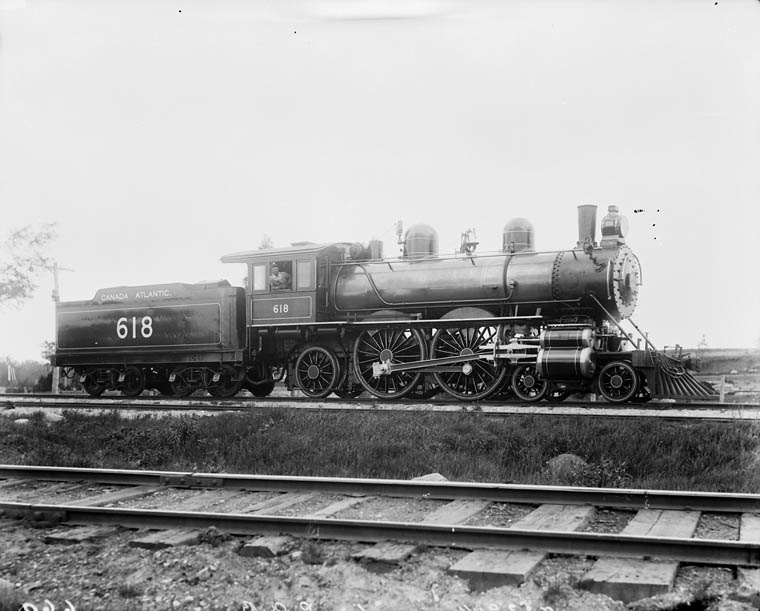
Vauclain compound Engine 618, Canada Atlantic Railway

The CAR owes its existence to industrialist John Rudolphus Booth. J.R. Booth was an Ottawa-based lumber baron who in the latter half of the 19th century amassed timber rights approaching 7,000 sq mi (18,000 km^{2}) in central and northern Ontario. J.R. Booth was North America's largest timber-rights holder at the time and was also the owner of the world's largest lumbering operation, located at Chaudière Falls on the Ottawa River just upstream from Parliament Hill.

Booth's sawmill operations could never run at full capacity because the output could not be carried out of the lumber yards fast enough. As a result of the transportation problems he experienced in the Ottawa area, Booth became an important participant in the development of Canada's railway system when he purchased two railway companies in 1879, the Montreal and City of Ottawa Junction Railway (M&OJ) and the Coteau and Province Line Railway and Bridge Company (C&PL), merging them to create the Canada Atlantic Railway. The M&OJ had received a charter to build southeast from Ottawa to Coteau, QC on the north bank of the St Lawrence River. The C&PL had received a charter to build a bridge across the St Lawrence River to Valleyfield, QC and then across southwestern Quebec to Swanton, VT on the eastern shore of Lake Champlain. Due to financial difficulties, neither line had been completed and Booth worked through the early to mid 1880s on completing this route between Ottawa and Swanton.

In the late 1880s and throughout the 1890s Booth established a third company, the Ottawa, Arnprior and Parry Sound Railway (OA&PS) which received a charter to build northwest from Ottawa to the shores of Lake Huron at Depot Harbour, ON. All three lines met "end to end". The M&OJ met the OA&PS on Booth's sawmill property in Ottawa while the C&PL met the M&OJ in Coteau, using several hundred feet of trackage rights of the Grand Trunk Railway (GTR). In 1899 Booth merged the OA&PS into the CAR, retaining the name Canada Atlantic Railway.

=== Ottawa to Vermont ===
In 1871 and 1872 a group headed by Donald Macdonald, the brother of Ontario's first premier, John Sandfield Macdonald, created two railway companies which received charters to build tracks between Ottawa and northern Vermont. The promoters failed to lay any track, mainly due to the high cost of bridging the St. Lawrence River.

The Montreal and City of Ottawa Junction Railway (M&OJ) would run south-east from Ottawa to Coteau-du-Lac, just west of Montreal. The line would connect to the Grand Trunk Railway (GTR) at what became known as Coteau Junction, also known as Coteau station. Crossing the GTR main line, the Coteau and Province Line Railway and Bridge Company (C&PL) ran southeast, bridging the St. Lawrence River to reach Valleyfield where it crossed the original Beauharnois Canal at a lock, thence across southwestern Quebec to Cantic and then crossing the northern end of Lake Champlain between Alburgh and Swanton where it ended at a connection with the Central Vermont Railway (CVR).

In 1879 Booth, with William Perley of Ottawa and J. Gregory Smith of St. Albans, Vermont, purchased the lines from the Macdonald group as part of an aggressive railway expansion plan. By this time Booth's mills were hampered by a lack of markets, and the lines would connect the mill with the US eastern seaboard markets, either for regional consumption or for export to Europe from year-round Atlantic coast ports. On 15 May 1879 the two lines were amalgamated into the newly chartered Canada Atlantic Railway. (Note: By act of parliament of the Dominion of Canada, 42 Victoria chapter 57. Bell states correctly this was in May. Some other sources give March in error.)

Between July 1881 and September 1882 track was laid from Ottawa to Coteau and trains began to run regularly. Approval for a bridge across the St. Lawrence River was delayed, partly because of lobbying by competing railways and partly from fears of the effect a bridge would have on river traffic. Threatened with a lapsed charter in 1884, Booth instituted a train ferry for the C&PL by early 1885 and completed the line through to Vermont using trackage rights on a small section of the GTR main line at Coteau, QC.

Bridging of the St. Lawrence River started in 1887. Work began in May 1888 and was completed in February 1890. The bridge consisted of three sections on 16 piers. The route included 2,125 ft (648 m) of track located on river islands, thus only 3,906 ft (1,191 m) of bridging was built. The northern section included a 355 ft (108 m) swing bridge elevated 25 ft (7.6 m) above the water for the river's navigation channel. A decade later, an additional structure was added on the north shore when the Soulanges Canal was built.

In Vermont the CAR connected with the Delaware & Hudson Railway, the Rutland Railroad, and the Central Vermont Railway. In 1897 a 3.1 mi (5.0 km) US connector section (the Province Line Railroad, later the Vermont and Province Line Railroad) made shipments into the United States even more efficient.

=== Ottawa to Lake Huron ===
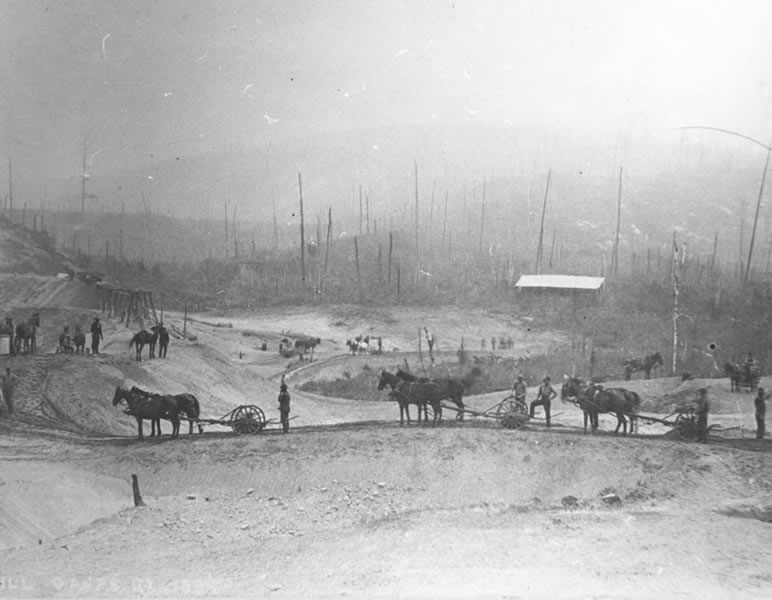
Construction scene inside Algonquin Park, ca. 1894-5

With the completion of the Ottawa to Vermont section, Booth began looking westward from Ottawa, not only to transport logs year-round to his Ottawa lumber mills, but also to take advantage of the increasing grain production on the prairies which was destined for eastern North American and European markets. By building through to an appropriate harbour on Georgian Bay for the receiving of Great Lake steamers, Booth could avoid the large expense of building a land-line through the rough and uninhabited terrain north of Lake Huron and Lake Superior.

In 1888 Booth incorporated the Ottawa, Arnprior and Renfrew Railway, and the Ottawa and Parry Sound Railway to build track from Ottawa to Lake Huron. Despite opposition from the Canadian Pacific and from Toronto business interests, despite fires at his large Ottawa saw mill and the deaths of his partners, Booth pushed forward with his rail line.

Even though from September 1892 to May 1893 only the Ottawa to Arnprior section had been built (38 miles (61 km), by December 1896 the line was complete through Algonquin Park to Depot Harbour on Georgian Bay, although another 16 months was needed to complete ancillary elements such as freight yards and port facilities. The first eastbound train, Depot Harbour to Ottawa, ran on 22 April 1898. In the process Booth had acquired (1892) the Parry Sound Colonization Railway which had started to build track westward from Scotia Junction towards Parry Sound.

Depot Harbour

The original plan for the western terminus of the CAR was in the vicinity of Parry Sound. However speculation in the late 1880s and early 1890s drove up the price of the necessary terminus and port lands. In 1885, after he had visited the Parry Sound area, Booth chose instead to locate the terminus on undeveloped land on nearby Parry Island, occupied by Parry Island Indian Reservation (No. 16). Under pressure from the federal Department of Indian Affairs, the local band that autumn surrendered the necessary 315.5 acres (127.7 ha) for the rail access, terminus, port facilities and residences. A further 110 acres (45 ha) were purchased in 1899.

The new port was named Depot Harbour and it proved to be one of the better natural harbours on the Great Lakes. Booth built both a town site and port, including waterfront freight sheds, a 1,000,000 imp bsh (36,000 m^{3}) grain elevator, wharves, water towers, pumping stations, offices, a bunk house, hotel, over 100 company houses, a community centre, a school, and several churches. The 1901 census recorded 576 inhabitants in the village, plus 231 on the reservation.

The railway accessed Depot Harbour by crossing South Channel between Parry Island and Rose Point on the Wasauksing Swing Bridge.

=== Great Lakes shipping ===
In 1898 Booth created the Canada Atlantic Transit Company to operate steamships on the Great Lakes from Depot Harbour to Fort William and in 1899 the Canada Atlantic Transit Company of the United States to operate between Depot Harbour and American ports such as Chicago and Duluth.

During their early years, the ships of both companies, as well as other vessels operating under charter, regularly carried goods between the upper Great Lakes and Depot Harbour. These shipping routes linked the railway across eastern Ontario, to Vermont with other railways in western Canada and the United States which terminated at ports in Lake Michigan and Lake Superior. Overall, east-bound tonnage far exceeded west-bound tonnage with a ratio of about 4:1. Booth was able to make a profit on the ships during the few years that he owned them, however, after the sale of the CAR and its shipping lines to the GTR, the profits turned to losses and shipping declined in importance.

=== Statistics ===
Grain and Lumber freight, 1899–1902:
Year	Grain (bushels)	Lumber (fbm)
1899	12,999,612	224,267,000
1900	15,053,238	374,906,000
1901	19,301,281	231,869,000
1902	19,038,924	311,885,460

- In the 1899 season Depot Harbour handled 38.4% of all grain shipped via Great Lakes rail ports, and 51.2% of all western grain exported from Montreal.
- Between 1899 and 1914, grain traffic averaged 13,084,483 bushels (475,866 m^{3}) per year.
- Between 1987 and 1095, lumber traffic averaged 294,272,203 board feet (694,405.07 m^{3}) per year.
- Between 1897 and 1914, passenger traffic averaged 419,139 people per year.

=== Under the Grand Trunk Railway ===
Throughout the 1890s, the Government of Canada promoted the creation of a second transcontinental railway line that could compete with the Canadian Pacific as well as American railroads. Federal politicians and bureaucrats believed that Booth's railways could form a strategic link in such a new system.

Booth himself was concerned with building the railways as well as marketing the service to build and maintain tonnage on the new lines. He was open to cooperation with other railways in eastern and western Canada, as well as to sale or amalgamation with a larger railway system. Only 4 years after the CAR was finally created, Booth was contemplating such a sale by 1901. Whether it was because Booth at age 74 was tired, or because he realized that competition from other transcontinental lines would soon cause serious problems for the CAR, he did everything possible in the early years of the 20th century to make every aspect of the railway profitable, and therefore attractive to potential buyers.

Prompted by the federal government, the Grand Trunk Railway began negotiating with Booth to acquire the Canada Atlantic as part of the Grand Trunk's efforts to expand into northern Ontario and eventually into Western Canada. In August 1904 the Grand Trunk agreed to purchase the Canada Atlantic system, including the Great Lakes steamship fleet and the line in Vermont which connected with its Central Vermont Railway subsidiary. The agreed-upon price for the entire system as well as the Depot Harbour and Ottawa terminals was CAD $16,000,000. The Grand Trunk took over all operations of the CAR on 1 October 1905; actual purchase was ratified by Parliament only in 1914.

After the purchase closed, the GTR appeared to be in no hurry to consolidate the CAR into the larger system, operating it instead as a stand-alone company for another nine years. While a Grand Trunk subsidiary, the Canada Atlantic purchased the Pembroke Southern Railway in 1906 and in 1907 the CAR created the Ottawa Terminals Railway Company; in 1912 the OTR built a large train station in downtown Ottawa near Parliament Hill and directly across Wellington Street from the GTR-owned Château Laurier hotel. This train station operated until the 1960s when it was converted into the Government Conference Centre.

The CAR was merged into the Grand Trunk on 27 May 1914 and the subsidiary company's name started to disappear as the Grand Trunk's timetables and equipment started to usurp those of the former subsidiary. Despite further Grand Trunk investments in the former CAR infrastructure, including new depot facilities, improved roadbeds and heavier track, the increased freight tonnage, passengers and income did not keep pace with the more rapidly increasing costs, so that net losses increased year by year. After the First World War, the bankrupt (or near-bankrupt) Grand Trunk Railway was finally taken over in 1923 and absorbed into the new government-owned Canadian National, which also took over ownership of the former Canada Atlantic properties.

Despite efforts by the Grand Trunk Railway to turn a profit, including the former CAR lines, it was fairly obvious not long after the 1905 purchase that this was not going to happen. The separate CAR accounts during the transition period (1905–1914) made that clear.

The Grand Trunk was the last significant railway in Canada to be nationalized by the federal government into the Canadian National (CN). During the run-up period to 1923, while it was well understood that the federal government would force the amalgamation of a number of money-losing railways, including the Canadian Northern and eventually the Grand Trunk, which would require extensive rationalization of trackage. The GTR was itself involved in pruning unnecessary routes and the former-CAR system was not immune. The GTR found it was particularly expensive to operate on the section over the height of land through Algonquin Park known as the Haliburton Highlands. This hilly area required that heavy or long freight trains had to be either "doubled" (separated and pulled in sections over the high point), or required helper locomotives. The GTR found that heavily loaded eastbound trains from Depot Harbour could be routed south around the Haliburton Highlands to eastern Ontario at less expense.

=== Under the Canadian National Railways ===
The insolvent GTR was acquired by the federal government and merged into CN in 1923. That year, a 5.5 mi (8.9 km) section of the CAR main line between Two Rivers and Algonquin Park Station was abandoned. (Note: In 1933 an iron trestle between Lake of Two Rivers and Cache Lake was damaged by flooding and neglect. Since the old CAR track had been already abandoned in this area for 10 years, CN did not want to repair it, nor did the federal government, which at the time was heavily subsidizing a road through Algonquin Park parallel to the railway, so the line remained physically severed.)

The western section of the CAR was heavily used by CN until the Great Depression collapsed the grain trade on the lakes. When a bridge washed out in 1933 it was not replaced, and the line remained split inside the Algonquin Provincial Park. Service ran on either side of the split into the 1950s.

CN closed most of its operations at Depot Harbour on 30 May 1953. All the remaining inhabitants of the village moved out and the buildings were either demolished or left to disintegrate. The rail line remained in place and from 1959 to 1979 iron ore from Northern Ontario was loaded at Depot Harbour into freighters. The workers commuted from Parry Sound and other nearby communities.

The CAR steamship companies that had been sold along with the railway in 1905 to the Grand Trunk continued to operate under CN ownership until after World War II. The American company was voluntarily dissolved in 1948 and the charter for the Canadian company was allowed to lapse in 1950.

== Current status ==
Most of the CAR line west of Ottawa has been abandoned. East of Ottawa, the line is still mostly intact to Coteau and is used by CN freight trains and Via Rail passenger trains. The bridge over the St Lawrence is still intact as CN uses this for an industrial spur between Coteau and Valleyfield. The line has been abandoned east of Valleyfield to Cantic. The line is still intact between Cantic and Swanton, VT

- To the east of Two Rivers, the 16.46-mile (26.49 km) stretch to Whitney, just outside Algonquin Park was abandoned in 1946.
- Near the west end of the line, a 3.44 mi (5.54 km) section of duplicate track was abandoned in 1938. CN continued to use the parallel track of the former Canadian Northern Ontario Railway, later styled the Canadian Northern on its Toronto to Sudbury mainline.
- The 41.19 mi (66.29 km) section between Falding on the CN Toronto-Sudbury mainline (former Canadian Northern Railway) and Scotia Junction on the CN Washago-North Bay secondary line (former Grand Trunk Railway) was abandoned in 1955.
- The section from Kearney eastward through to the end of severed section at Algonquin Park Station was abandoned in 1959 (38.3 mi (61.6 km)).
- The section from Scotia Junction to Kearney was torn up in 1975 (5.4 mi (8.7 km)).

== Significant dates and legal history ==
Canada Atlantic Railway and predecessors

Ottawa and Parry Sound Railway (1888)
Ottawa, Arnprior and Parry Sound Railway (1891)
Ottawa, Arnprior and Renfrew Railway (1888)
Ottawa, Arnprior & Parry Sound Railway (1896)
Parry Sound Colonization Railway (1885)
Canada Atlantic Railway (1899)
Montreal and City of Ottawa Junction Railway (1871)
Canada Atlantic Railway (1879)
Coteau and Province Line Railway and Bridge Company (1872)

- 1871: Montreal and City of Ottawa Junction Railway Company created
- 1872: Coteau and Province Line Railway and Bridge Company created
- 1879: J.R. Booth buys and merges the two lines, creating the Canada Atlantic Railway Company
- 1881 to 1882: Ottawa to Coteau section completed
- 1882: Province Line Railroad Company created in Vermont
- 1885: system south of the St. Lawrence River completed
- 1885: Parry Sound Colonization Railway created
- 1887: Coteau Bridge over the St. Lawrence River approved
- 1888 to 1890: Coteau Bridge built
- 1888: Ottawa, Arnprior and Renfrew Railway Company created
- 1888: Ottawa and Parry Sound Railway Company created
- 1891: Ottawa, Arnprior and Parry Sound Railway Company created (amalgamation of Ottawa, Arnprior and Refrew Railway Co. and Ottawa and Parry Sound Railway Co.)
- 1891: Parry Sound Colonization Railway acquired.
- 1893 to 1896: rail laid from Ottawa to Georgian Bay
- 1895: Parry Island/Depot Harbour land acquired
- 1896: Ottawa, Arnprior and Parry Sound Railway Company (amalgamation of existing railway and Parry Sound Colonization Railway Co.)
- 1897: Vermont and Province Line Railroad created in Vermont
- 1897: Vermont and Province Line Railroad section built
- 1898: through train service established, Depot Harbour to Ottawa
- 1898: Canada Atlantic Transit Company created
- 1899: Canada Atlantic Transit Company of the United States created
- 1899: Canada Atlantic Railway amalgamates with Ottawa, Arnprior and Parry Sound Railway Co.
- 1905: control of CAR, the Vermont railroad and the two steamship companies assumed by the Grand Trunk Railway (1 October)
- 1914: sale of CAR to Grand Trunk Railway ratified by Parliament; Canada Atlantic Railway Company ceases to exist
- 1923: bankrupt Grand Trunk Railway absorbed by Canadian National
- 1923: Last through trains between Depot Harbour and Ottawa
- 1923–1959: abandonment of main track sections
- 1953: closing of Depot Harbour Village

== See also ==
- List of Ontario railways
- History of rail transport in Canada
- List of defunct Canadian railways
