= Upper Madawaska River Provincial Park =

Provincial park in Ontario, Canada

- IUCN category II (national park)
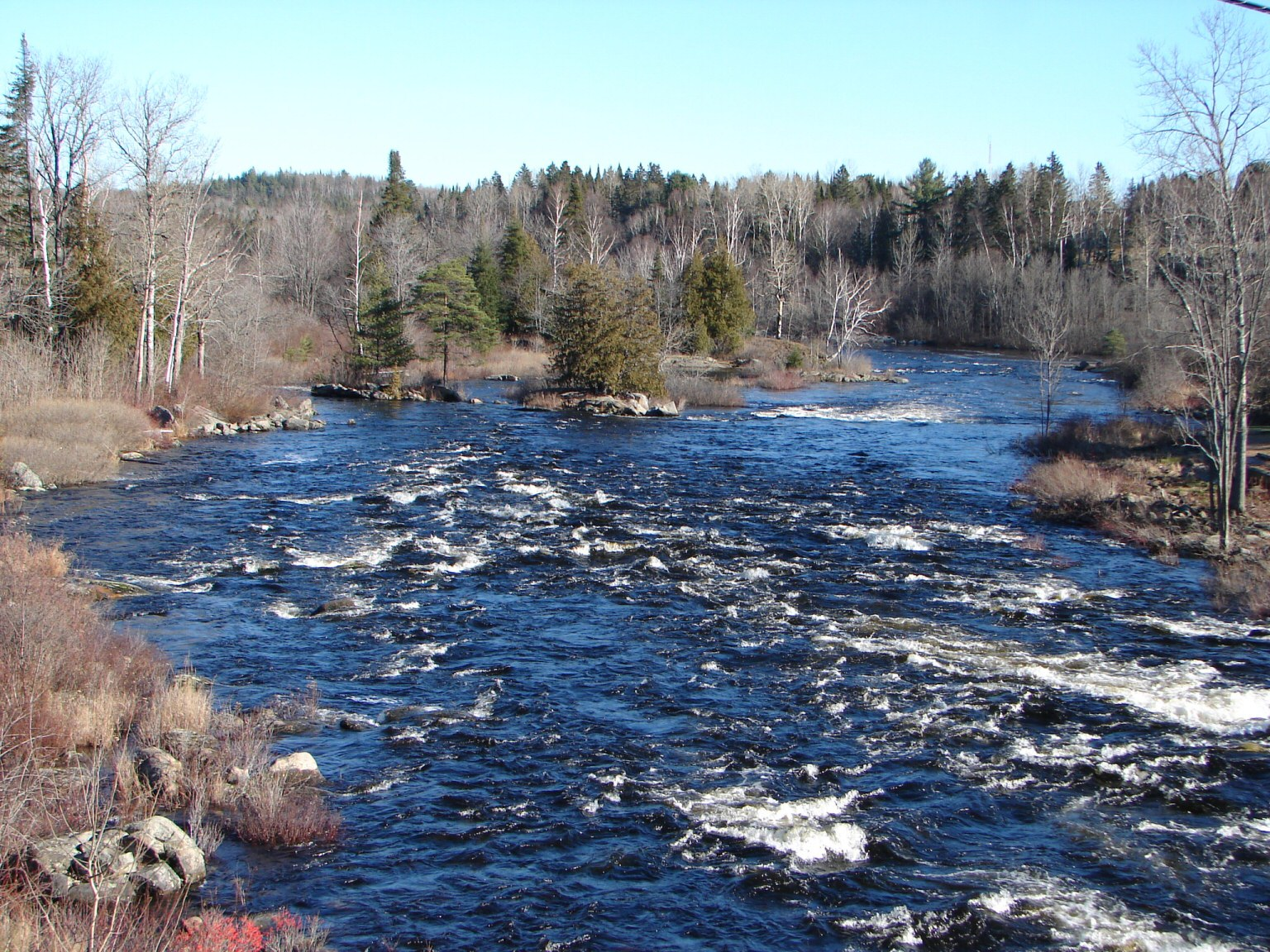
- Madawaska River at Whitney, the western/upstream boundary of the park

- Location within Southern Ontario
- Location: Nipissing District, Ontario
- Nearest city: Pembroke, Ontario
- Coordinates: 45°29′41″N 78°04′08″W
- Area: 1,085 ha (4.19 sq mi)
- Established: 1989
- Governing body: Ontario Parks
- Website: Official website

Upper Madawaska River Provincial Park is a waterway-class provincial park on the Madawaska River in the municipality of South Algonquin in Nipissing District, Ontario, Canada. The park consists of a strip of land along both shores of the Madawaska River from the communities of Whitney to Madawaska. It is upstream and north of (and not contiguous with) the Lower Madawaska River Provincial Park.

As a non-operating park, it offers neither facilities nor services. Its most popular use is for whitewater kayaking and canoeing. A rail corridor along the river that was originally built for the now-abandoned Ottawa, Arnprior and Parry Sound Railway has been incorporated into the park in the form of a rail trail.

== See also ==
- List of Ontario parks
