= South Algonquin =

- Township municipality (single-tier)
- Township of South Algonquin
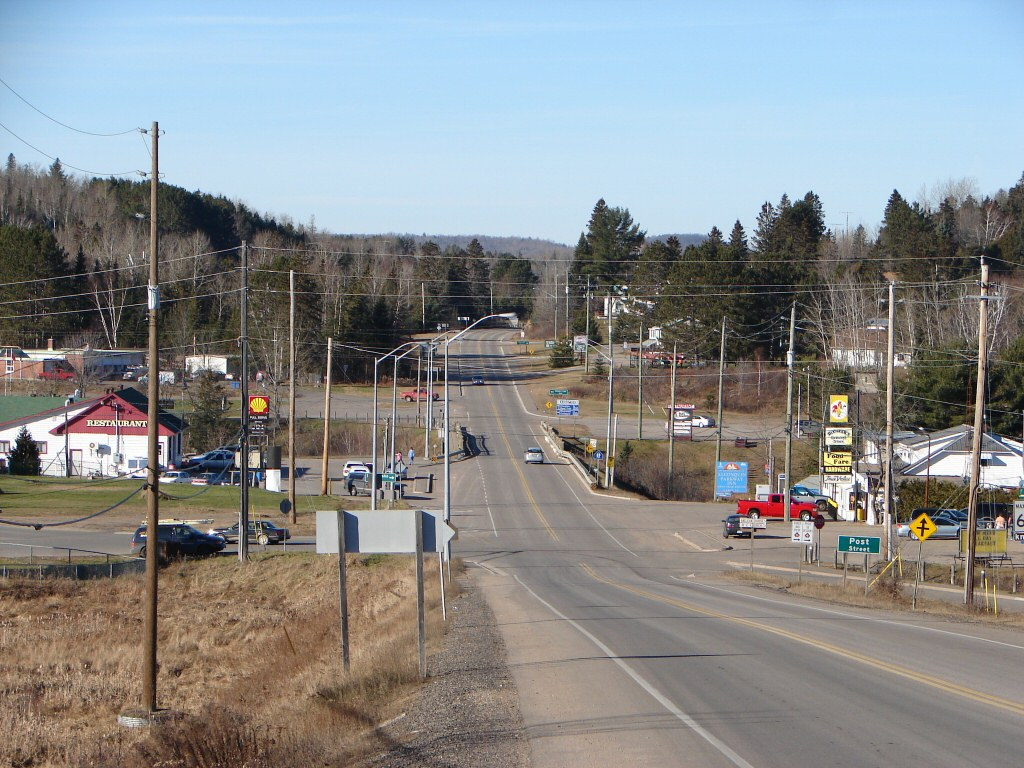
- Highway 60 in Whitney

- Location on a map of Southern Ontario
- Coordinates: 45°29′48″N 78°01′26″W
- Country: Canada
- Province: Ontario
- District: Nipissing
- Settled: 1890s
- Incorporated: June 1, 1998

Government
  - Type: Township
  - Mayor: Ethel LaValley
  - Governing body: South Algonquin Township Council
  - Councillors: List: Sandra Collins (Lyell); Joe Florent (Murchison); Dave Harper (Airy); Mike Kalimin (Airy); Richard Shalla (Sabine); Joe Vermaire (Dickens)
  - Fed. riding: Algonquin—Renfrew—Pembroke
  - Prov. riding: Renfrew—Nipissing—Pembroke

Area
  - Total: 867.73 km^{2} (335.03 sq mi)

Population (2021)
  - Total: 1,055
  - Density: 1.2/km^{2} (3.1/sq mi)
- Time zone: UTC-5 (EST)
  - Summer (DST): UTC-4 (EDT)
- Postal code: K0J 2M0
- Area codes: 613, 343
- Website: www.southalgonquin.ca

South Algonquin is a township municipality in Nipissing District, Ontario, Canada. Located south of Algonquin Provincial Park, it is the sole populated portion of the district that lies south of the traditional dividing line between Northern Ontario and Southern Ontario and is closer connected to Renfrew County as opposed to the core portions of Nipissing District.

South Algonquin was established on June 1, 1998, when the Township of Airy (incorporated in 1962 from unorganized area) was merged with the unorganized townships of Dickens, Sabine, Lyell, and Murchison. The township had a population of 1,055 in the 2021 Canadian census.

== Geography ==
The communities of Aylen Lake, Cross Lake, Gunters, Madawaska, McKenzie Lake, Murchison, Opeongo, Wallace, and Whitney are in South Algonquin.

It includes the geographic townships of Airy, Dickens, Lyell, Murchison, and Sabine, with the exception of a triangle, the northwest corner, of Airy Township, that is part of Algonquin Provincial Park.

== History ==
The area was settled primarily as the site for the sawmill of the St. Anthony Lumber Company, of Minneapolis, Minnesota. It is named for the firm's general manager, Edwin Canfield Whitney.

By 1892 work had commenced on the Ottawa, Arnprior and Parry Sound Railway (later the Canada Atlantic Railway), by Ottawa lumberman John Rudolphus Booth, whose sawmill at the Chaudière Falls, Ottawa, was considered to be one of the largest in North America, second only to a mill in Minneapolis. At the end of 1892, Booth arranged a takeover of the adjacent Perley and Pattee mill from the estate of his former colleague William Goodhue Perley.

Timber berths on the upper Madawaska River, in the townships of Airy and Nightingale, belonging to the Perley & Pattee Lumber Company, were sold in 1894, to the St. Anthony Lumber Company, of Minneapolis. As the OA&PS Railway was being constructed to access this area, Whitney persuaded the management of the St. Anthony firm to purchase the timber berths.

About a year after the Whitney sawmill was built, Fowler and Hill sold the Minneapolis mill and associated timber limits to Frederick Weyerhaeuser of Saint Paul, Minnesota. Whitney who had large timber holdings near Brainerd, Minnesota, sold them to Weyerhaeuser as well and made enough profit that he was able to purchase his partners' interests in the Whitney concern and continue its operation on his own.

Through the early 20th century, the Canada Atlantic Railway underwent a series of acquisitions, with the section through what would become South Algonquin becoming known as the CN Renfrew Subdivision under the Canadian National Railways. With railway rationalization and the onset of the Great Depression, rail operations through Algonquin Park ceased, and the rails were lifted around 1942. This cut off the through route to Depot Harbour and Parry Sound District in the west, turning the former central part of the Canada Atlantic mainline into a branch line. Operations beyond the wye at Whitney were ended in 1946, with the rails being lifted in 1952.

The Canadian National Railway Renfrew Subdivision was abandoned between Whitney and Renfrew in 1983.

== Demographics ==
In the 2021 Census of Population conducted by Statistics Canada, South Algonquin had a population of 1,055 living in 527 of its 894 total private dwellings, a change of −3.7% from its 2016 population of 1,096. With a land area of 867.73 km^{2} (335.03 sq mi), it had a population density of 1.2/km^{2} (3.1/sq mi) in 2021.

Canada census – South Algonquin community profile

	2021	2016	2011
Population	1,055 (-3.7% from 2016)	1096 (-9.5% from 2011)	1211 (-3.4% from 2006)
Land area	867.73 km^{2} (335.03 sq mi)	873.43 km^{2} (337.23 sq mi)	872.49 km^{2} (336.87 sq mi)
Population density	1.2/km^{2} (3.1/sq mi)	1.3/km^{2} (3.4/sq mi)	1.4/km^{2} (3.6/sq mi)
Median age	59.6 (M: 59.2, F: 59.6)	56.2 (M: 56.1, F: 56.2)
Private dwellings	894 (total) 527 (occupied)	855 (total) 528 (occupied)	977 (total)
Median household income	$61,200	$49,835

References: 2021 2016 2011

Historical census populations – South Algonquin
Year	Pop.	±%
2001	1,278	—
2006	1,253	−2.0%
2011	1,211	−3.4%
2016	1,096	−9.5%
2021	1,055	−3.7%
Source: Statistics Canada

== Parks ==
Opeongo River Provincial Park and Upper Madawaska River Provincial Park are in South Algonquin.

== See also ==
- List of townships in Ontario
