= Ottawa, Arnprior and Parry Sound Railway =

Historic railway in Ontario, Canada

Overview
- Headquarters: Ottawa, Ontario
- Reporting mark: OA&PS
- Locale: Ontario, Canada
- Dates of operation: 1897–1959
- Successor: Canada Atlantic Railway

Technical
- Track gauge: 4 ft 8 1/2 in (1,435 mm) standard gauge

The Ottawa, Arnprior and Parry Sound Railway, or OA&PS, is a historic railway that operated in central and eastern Ontario, Canada, from 1897 to 1959. It was for a time the busiest railway route in Canada, carrying both timber and wood products from today's Algonquin Provincial Park areas, as well as up to 40% of the grain traffic from the Canadian west from Depot Harbour at Parry Sound through to the St. Lawrence River valley.

The railway was built by John Rudolphus Booth, a 19th-century Canadian lumber baron and entrepreneur who owned considerable timber rights in the Algonquin area as well as a major sawmill in downtown Ottawa. To open markets for the mill's products, he purchased Donald Macdonald's lines and formed the Canada Atlantic Railway (CAR) from Ottawa to Vermont. To supply the mills, the OA&PS shipped timber in from across central Ontario. Together, the OA&PS and CAR allowed through shipment from the Canadian west to the US eastern seaboard areas. The lines were amalgamated under the CAR marque in 1899, and sold to the Grand Trunk Railway in 1905.

Use of the OA&PS fell dramatically with the rapid stripping of most of the useful timber from the Algonquin area. Traffic was further reduced with the 1932 opening of the widened Welland Canal, which allowed lakers to bypass trans-shipping points on Georgian Bay, along with the dramatic decrease in grain prices and trade during the Great Depression. The trestle bridge between Cache Lake and Lake of Two Rivers closed in 1933 due to safety concerns and was not re-built. Both ends of the now-separated line continued in use for some time; the western section between Parry Sound and Cache Lake ended services in 1952, while the eastern section saw use in some locations until 1959.

Its route through Algonquin Provincial Park saw it play an important role in the park's development of the tourist industry, with a large station and the Highland Inn on Cache Lake being a focal point of the park though the 1910s and 20s. Sections through the Park now form an expanding group of rail trails used mostly for cycling. Outside the park the line forms various rail trails including the Park-to-Park Trail, Seguin Trail, and others.

== History ==
=== Logging empire ===
John Egan opened logging in central Ontario in the 1840s with a string of saw and grist mills along the Ottawa River. The drainage area for the river allowed timber rafts to be floated to the mills from an enormous area, and Egan purchased lands throughout central Ontario to feed timber to the mills. In 1854 a crash in red pine prices forced the entire empire into bankruptcy, and Egan turned his attention to politics.

In 1867 John Rudolphus Booth purchased a 250 square mile tract of Egan's lands on the western side of today's Algonquin Park. Booth continued to add to his collection of holdings and by the 1890s held title to over 7,000 square miles of lands. Mill work was centralized at Booth's operations at Chaudiere Falls in downtown Ottawa, which evolved in the largest sawmill operation in the world. Logging was initially carried out in areas with easy access to waterways leading to the Ottawa River, but over time these started to be used up.

=== Into railways ===
In 1884 Booth entered the railway world with the formation of the Nosbonsing and Nipissing Railway, a 5½ mile portage railway that allowed lumber collected into Lake Nipissing to be carried to Lake Nosbonsing, which connected to the Ottawa. The railway was originally private, but received a charter in 1886 after a dispute with the Northern and Pacific Junction Railway over crossing rights.

Booth then began a massive railway expansion program, both to supply the mills from areas not on the River, as well as to send the products from the Ottawa mill to markets not easily served via the St. Lawrence. This program started with Booth's purchase of Macdonald's Montreal and City of Ottawa Junction Railway (M&O) from Ottawa to Coteau Junction, where it met the Grand Trunk Railway lines just west of Montreal, as well as the Coteau and Province Line Railway and Bridge Company which linked the M&O to the Central Vermont Railway just across the St. Lawrence. Construction began in 1881 and finally crossed the St. Lawrence in 1890.

In 1888 Booth chartered the Ottawa, Arnprior and Renfrew Railway to build a line from Ottawa to Renfrew, as well as the Ottawa and Parry Sound Railway which ran from Parry Sound to Renfrew. The two lines were amalgamated into the Ottawa, Arnprior and Parry Sound in 1891. Together with the Ottawa to Vermont lines, the OA&PS would open up vast areas around the Great Lakes for rapid shipment to the US eastern seaboard, as well as providing a route for his own timber to reach Ottawa from areas not well served via the Ottawa River.

=== Competition ===
The Canadian Pacific Railway (CPR) running westward from Fort William on Lake Superior provided lake port access to the Canadian west from 1882. Grain shipments on the lakes were a major source of income, but the ships could only reach as far as Lake Erie, as the canal between Lake Erie and Ontario was, at that time, quite small. Moreover, the St. Lawrence passed through the Lachine Rapids at Montreal, which meant that loading back onto ships had to take place in Montreal or further east. This led to burgeoning business at ports on Georgian Bay for trans-shipment by rail to the east, but all of the lines in the area ran south, through Toronto, which was already heavily congested.

Although the CPR was completed from Fort William eastward to the Ottawa area in 1885, its route ran north of the lakes and did not offer convenient port facilities. Another route further to the south, connecting at Georgian Bay, would greatly reduce the railway section of shipments off the lakes. The obvious location for such a port would be Parry Sound, the deepest freshwater port in the world. The CPR started planning such a service under the charter of the Atlantic & North-West, and it was reported in 1892 that they wanted to beat Booth's line into operation. In that year, CPR expressed an interest in purchasing and completing the PSCR as the last leg of its A&NW route from Ottawa. Booth swept in and purchased the line out from under them. This action led to a series of tit-for-tat events between the two railways. The CPR was soon making public statements about their plans to build a parallel route to Booth's, and beat his line into service. When Booth's line reached Renfrew, a fight reportedly broke out between rival construction crews.

Booth ultimately won the contest due to a wrangle over a narrow passage at Haggarty Pass near Killaloe. A lawsuit between the OA&PS and CPR followed, which the CPR lost. Rails had already been run on the 19 mile section from Renfrew to Eganville, but the rest of the 186 mile route was abandoned. This led to an intense rivalry between Booth and the CPR that would last for decades, a business battle that the CPR would ultimately lose. Booth's OA&PS would go on to be the busiest line in Canada, at one point handling as much as 40% of the Canadian grain trade.

=== Selecting the route ===
A survey party of 24 men led by George Mountain left Ottawa on 20 November 1891 to survey the line through Nipissing District, returning on 8 March 1892. They surveyed 120 miles of road after a journey of over 500 miles through rough country on foot, carrying their supplies on sleds.

The Parry Sound Colonization Railway (PSCR) was chartered in 1885 to build a short-line railway from Parry Sound, Ontario to the newly formed Northern and Pacific Junction Railway that passed the town to the east. In 1891 about 20 miles of line had been laid from Scotia Junction to Bear Lake, a little less than half the route to Parry Sound, when the company ran out of funds for further construction. Booth purchased the line on 30 September 1892, apparently after hearing that the CPR was interested in it for their line.

With the eastern and western ends now fixed, a further survey between Long Lake and Emsdale, started in November 1893. On 28 March 1893, the CPR filed plans calling for a level crossing of the OA&PS near Golden Lake, but had not yet started construction. This line would have provided service to Eganville alongside the OA&PS, and the locals were highly skeptical after having been promised CPR service in 1875.

=== Building the line ===
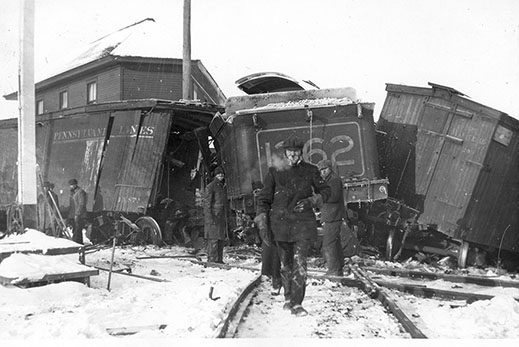
The diamond crossing between the OA&PS and B&O was the site of several collisions over its history, a tribute to its equally stormy building.

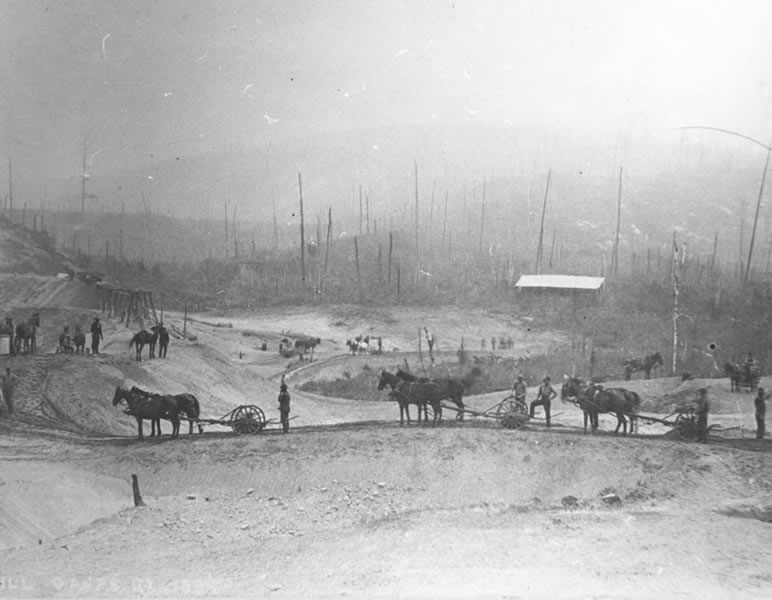
The rough terrain of the Canadian Shield is evident in this photo of the OA&PS being built through the area of today's Algonquin Park. Note the lack of vegetation in what is today completely covered by dense boreal forest.

Construction of the eastern sections began northward out of Ottawa in September 1892, reaching Arnprior in May 1893, and opened on 13 September 1893. When the OA&PS line started north out of town it had to cross the CPR's Brockville and Ottawa Railway (B&O) line, and on 20 September 1893 it was reported that crews from the two lines had come to blows, although later reports downplay the action.

In order to complete the junction, CPR demanded that the OA&PS lay 1,700 feet of rail on the far side of the crossing, so their trains could be run clear of the CPR line. To aid this, the OA&PS men laid their lines right up to the B&O so they could hand-carry the rails the short distance to the far side of the road. As the crossing was not operational, they were not legally allowed to be operating rails on CP land, so the CPR men were ordered to tear it up, forcing the OA&PS crew to carry the rails from further away. The OA&PS re-laid their line again, with reports that this caused a fight.

The CPR's Atlantic & North-West beat the OA&PS to Eganville, which ran a charter to the town on 30 December 1892 and opened regular service the next month. The OA&PS had considered running to Eganville, but the presence of the A&NW made such a detour redundant and the town had decided against paying both railways a bonus, giving their bonus to the "winner" alone. The line reached its closest approach to Eganville, about one mile to the southwest, at the end of 1893.

By this point the two railways had been in a court battle over the meaning of the agreement about land use rights in a small strip of land near Killaloe, which would have required the CPR to run for a distance over lands deeded to the OA&PS. Booth refused this, and the courts eventually agreed with him. The A&NW was now locked out of the direct approach through the Algonquin area and would be forced along a more northerly route, closer to their Brockville & Ottawa mainline. CPR gave up, and the A&NW line ended in Eganville.

West of Eganville the OA&PS began a steady climb through a series of rolling hills as it progressed through the Algonquin Highlands. Many trestles and bridges were required, which substantially increased the time and cost of construction. By the end of 1896 the railway was complete when it joined up with the track laid by the PSCR at the town of Scotia. The first train from Ottawa through to Depot Harbor ran with officials on 21 December 1896 The first paid trip from Parry Sound to Ottawa was William Taylor, his wife and his daughter.

=== Depot Harbour ===
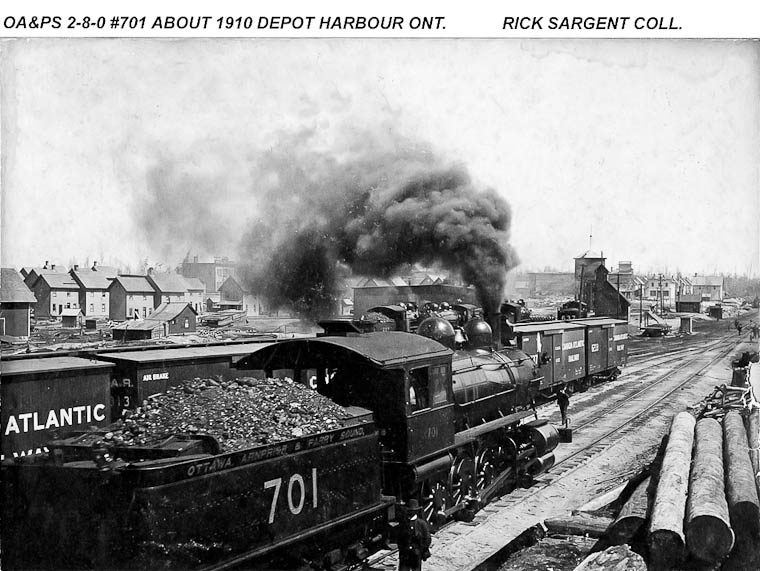
OA&PS engine #701 2-8-0 built by Baldwin Locomotive Works. The engine is shown in Depot Harbour, the western end of the line, just outside Parry Sound.

Booth and the town could not come to an agreement on the price of the harbour lands, and much to the town's anger, Booth decided to move the end of the line out of town. Taking advantage of a law that allowed Indian lands to be expropriated for railway use, he set the end of the line to the southwest of town and started building the new town of Depot Harbour in 1897. In 1898, Booth created a steamship company called the Canada Atlantic Transport Company. This allowed him to transport cargo by boat and rail from Thunder Bay to Ottawa faster than any other route then in existence.

The divisional point for the railway was built in Madawaska, about halfway between Parry Sound and Ottawa. This included a roundhouse and switching yard for the railway. Some local communities were upset at the choice of this site as it was fairly remote from current settlements. It was however within the timber limits of Booth's holdings. A logging-only branch was established west of Madawaska, at Egan Estate. This branch was operated separately as a logging railway, under the charter of the Nosbonsing and Nipissing Railway. Several entirely private spur lines were also built throughout the line.

In 1899, the railway was taken over by its parent company, the CAR, and the OA&PS naming officially disappeared. The CAR was now a single continuous line from Parry Sound to Vermont.

=== GTR era ===
In 1905 the entire CAR was sold to Grand Trunk Railway (GTR) for 14 million Canadian dollars. The railway continued to operate and by 1910 there was sufficient commerce to support one train every 20 minutes.

While the main use for the OA&PS was freight and timber transport, its existence through the wilderness of Algonquin Park gave easy access to the area. In 1908 the railway opened a lodge called Highland Inn. The venture was very successful and several lodges and youth camps were eventually built along the railway's route through the park.

In 1923, the bankrupt GTR was nationalized by the Government of Canada and merged into the Canadian National Railways (CNR).

In 1933, an unexpected flood undermined a trestle between Cache Lake and Lake of Two Rivers. The CNR was unable to afford repair costs and the federal government refused to provide a subsidy, thus ending through traffic for the railway. Service continued on either side of the split, but from this point traffic declined and by the end of the 1940s only a few passenger trains were running to the lodges in Algonquin Park.

CNR ended service on the western section in 1952, while service on the eastern section continued until 1959, bringing to a close rail service for much of central-eastern Ontario.

=== Legacy ===
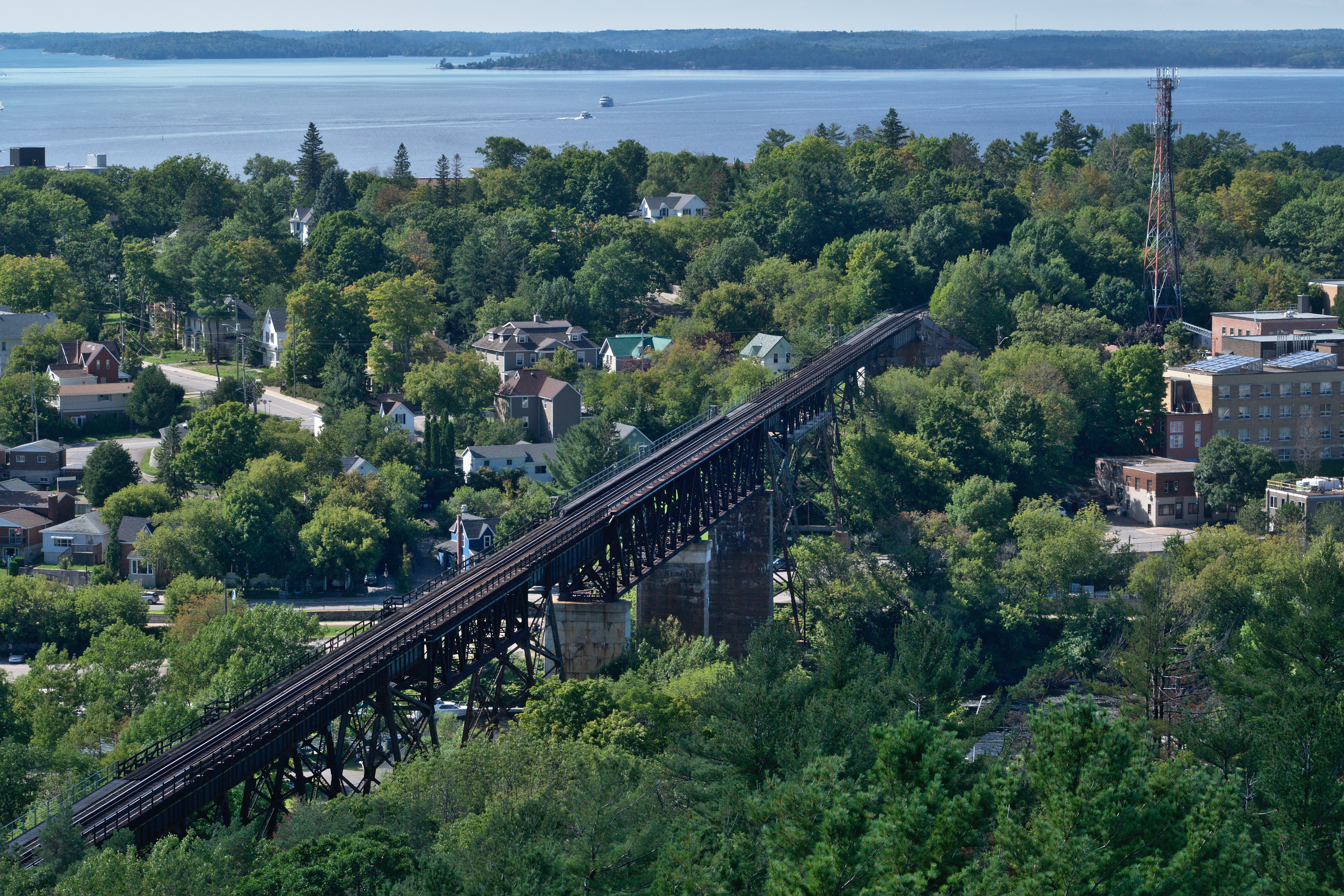
Railway trestle in Parry Sound

Only a short portion of the OA&PS remains in use, between Arnprior and a diamond junction with the CN mainlines just east of Ottawa. The route used to carry the lines into downtown Ottawa, but all rail lines in the area were removed in the 1960s as part of an urban beautification project, and moved south to the new Ottawa Train Station. The majority of the line's original Ottawa-area route is now part of Ontario Highway 417, also known as The Queensway, although a short section forms part of the Watts Creek Pathway on the western end of town.

For the majority of the eastern sections the trackage has been removed and its presence can only be seen due to a few scattered ruins that dot the landscape. Part has been incorporated into the Upper Madawaska River Provincial Park as a rail trail, which runs between Whitney and Madawaska. This services hikers, all-terrain vehicles, bicycles, and horseback riding in summer, and snowmobiles and dog-sled teams in winter. Parts of the rail bed in Algonquin Provincial park have been utilized as hiking and biking trail and vehicular access to leased properties near the parkway corridor. This section is being constantly expanded and re-connected.

The eastern end of the line is more heavily used for rail trail and other purposes. The section from Depot Harbour, including the swing-bridge to the mainland, is now used as the basis for Old Rail Line Road. Leading out of town is the Park-to-Park Trail, which leads from Killbear Provincial Park to Algonquin; the portion of the Park-to-Park Trail between Highway 400 south of Parry Sound and Highway 11 at Emsdale is also known as the Seguin Trail, with its western terminus also serving as the location of a major highway rest area and tourist information centre on Highway 400.

== Route ==
From its eastern end at Chaudière Falls in downtown Ottawa, the OA&PS ran south-west for a short section, following a large bend in the Ottawa River. It bent more westward south of Britannia Bay. The majority of this section of the line now lies under Highway 417, westward to the intersection with Ontario Highway 416. To the west of the highway junction, the line ran slightly north of the 417, and becomes visible again about one kilometre west of the junction, on the western side of the intersection with Moodie Drive. From here it becomes the Watts Creek Pathway for a short run to the diamond junction with CN's lines, where the line becomes active again.

The active section continues running west-southwest through the northern sections of Kanata, and then turns northwest at Huntmar Drive, where a major road bridge over the lines was built. The line continues northwest for the run to Arnprior, taking a brief turn to the east at Kinburn just before entering town. The line was routed around the western side of downtown Arnprior, and crossed the Brockville and Ottawa Railway on the town's northern edge. The line continues along the same basic northwest alignment to Renfrew, where it crossed the Kingston and Pembroke Railway just west of town at what was known as Renfrew Junction.

To this point the railway ran in the floodplains of the Ottawa or Bonnechere River, where the land is quite flat and the line is fairly straight. The line left the Bonnechere plain between Douglas and Eganville, where the terrain becomes more rugged. The line begins to meander, characteristic of any railway crossing the Canadian Shield. On the eastern end of Golden Lake, south of the town of the same name, the line turns due west. It also wyed off the Pembroke Southern Railway which ran northeast to Pembroke (closed in 1961). The OA&PS passed through the towns of Killaloe, Wilno and Barry's Bay, where it turned northwest again to avoid several large lakes in the Barry's Bay area. The line turned southwest again to reach Madawaska, the line's divisional point. Just west of town, the Egan Estates Railway branched off to run north into the bush.

West of Madawaska the line generally follows the meandering southern shore of the Madawaska River, crossing on a bridge to the northern bank just north of Whitney, where the river widens considerably. This was the start of another logging railway, the Whitney and Opeongo Railway, which ran northwest to Lake Opeongo to carry logs to the St. Anthony Lumber Company in Whitney. From Whitney, the line turned west again through Airy, following the lakes and rivers through Algonquin Park. After reaching the Highland Inn it started northwest again, leaving the park and reaching Kearney, and running the short remaining distance to the multi-part junction with the Northern and Pacific Junction Railway at Scotia.

From Scotia the line followed the PSCR route generally west-southwest to Foley. Here a wye junction carried lines into town, while the other branch continued westward to the end of the line at Depot Harbour, crossing to Parry Island on a large swing bridge. The section into town is now used as part of CN's Northern Ontario James Bay Railway, although several large spurs in town have been abandoned.

== See also ==
- List of Ontario railways
- List of defunct Canadian railways
