= Northern and Pacific Junction Railway =

Railway in Ontario, Canada

Map

The Northern and Pacific Junction Railway (N&PJ) is a historic railway located in northern Ontario, Canada. It connected the Northern Railway of Canada's endpoint in Gravenhurst to the Canadian Pacific Railway (CPR) at Nipissing Junction, near North Bay. The N&PJ provided an almost straight line north-south route from Toronto to the transcontinental line, competing with a similar line of the Canadian Northern Railway (CNoR) a short distance to the west.

The railway was incorporated in 1881 as the Northern, North-Western, and Sault Ste. Marie Railway Company, changing its name to N&PJ in 1883. The railway was acquired by the Northern Railway of Canada and the Hamilton and North-Western Railway in 1883.

Construction was commenced at Gravenhurst in 1885 and completed to a connection with the CPR in 1886, at which time the line was leased to its owners. Following the amalgamation of its owners with the Grand Trunk Railway in 1888, the N&PJ was merged with the GTR in 1892, which later became part of the Canadian National Railways.

Principal stations along this route, from Gravenhurst are:

- Bracebridge
- Utterson
- Huntsville
- Novar
- Scotia Junction (connection to Ottawa, Arnprior and Parry Sound Railway)
- Emsdale
- Burk's Falls
- Sundridge
- South River
- Trout Creek
- Powassan
- Lake Nosbonsing Road (formerly Nosbonsing and Nipissing Railway)
- Callander
- Nipissing Junction (original 1886 connection with CPR, to North Bay station).

== See also ==
- List of Ontario railways
- List of defunct Canadian railways
