= John Rudolphus Booth =

Canadian businessman

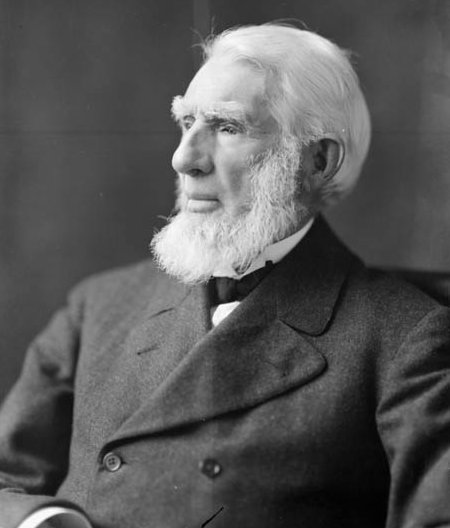
- Born: April 5, 1827; Waterloo, Lower Canada
- Died: December 8, 1925 (aged 98); Ottawa, Ontario, Canada
- Resting place: Beechwood Cemetery, Ottawa
- Spouse: Rosalinda Cook

John Rudolphus Booth (April 5, 1827 - December 8, 1925) was a Canadian lumber tycoon and railroad baron. He controlled logging rights for large tracts of forest land in central Ontario, and built the Canada Atlantic Railway (from Georgian Bay via Ottawa to Vermont) to extract his logs and to export lumber and grain to the United States and Europe. In 1892, his lumber complex was the largest operation of its kind in the world.

He arrived in Bytown (later renamed Ottawa) at the same time as many other future lumber entrepreneurs such as Henry Bronson, W.G. Perley, John Harris (Note: Bronson's partner) and E.B. Eddy. Even so, by 1890 Booth had overtaken them all to become the largest lumber producer in the world. It was said that at one point the timberlands under his control occupied an area larger than France.

He was familiar with all aspects of his industry, and one observer noted:

[He] knew the forest as a sailor knows the sea, and his success was largely due to the fact that he never overestimated its potentialities.

== Early life ==
J. R. Booth was born on a farm at Lowes near Waterloo (Shefford County) in the Eastern Townships of Quebec, Lower Canada. His parents, John Booth (Ireland, 1802 - Quebec, 1877) and Eleanor Helen Booth (née Rowley) (Ireland, 1804 - Quebec, 1834) were Irish immigrants, had a number of children (variously reported as 5, 6 and 8); his paternal grandparents were John Booth and Elizabeth Hill; his patrilineal great-grandfather, Robert Booth who married Eleanor Taylor, was the son of Peter Booth, whose father, James Booth, a Freeman of Dublin, was fourth son of the Rev. Humphrey Booth and wife Letitia Jones. He was related to the Booth Baronets.

John Booth left the family farm at the age of 21 and got a job as a carpenter with the Central Vermont Railroad. In Kingsey Township, Lower Canada, on January 7, 1853, he married Rosalinda Cooke (Philipsburg, Monteregie Region, Quebec, March 12, 1829 - Ottawa, Ontario, March 24, 1886, buried in Beechwood Cemetery, Ottawa, Ottawa Municipality, Ontario), daughter of Thomas Cooke (1790 - Abbott's Corner, Monteregie Region, Quebec, July 15, 1873) and wife Eliza Armstrong (Ireland, July 1808 - Saint-Armand, Monteregie Region, Quebec, March 29, 1871, buried in Abbott's Corner Cemetery, Monteregie Region, Quebec), and maternal granddaughter of Robert Armstrong Sr. (Whalton, Northumberland, August 30, 1777 - Franklin, Franklin County, Vermont, January 30, 1850, buried in Abbott's Corner Cemetery, Monteregie Region, Quebec) and wife Ann Lattimore Booth (Rennington, Northumberland, April 8, 1786 - Franklin, Franklin County, Vermont, October 21, 1849, buried in Abbott's Corner Cemetery, Monteregie Region, Quebec), and moved to the Ottawa River valley. He was involved in the construction of a paper mill in Sherbrooke, and a sawmill in Hull. Upon completion of the latter, its owner, Andrew Leamy hired him to manage the mill for a year. He then ventured out on his own, opening a shingle mill in Hull in a mill that he rented from Alonzo Wright, but within months it was destroyed by fire. He established his own lumber company and won the contract to supply wood for the Parliament buildings at the new Canadian capital of Ottawa, selected by Queen Victoria in 1858. In winning the contract, he underbid more established firms by hiring unemployed longshoremen from Montreal.

== Building a lumber and railway empire ==
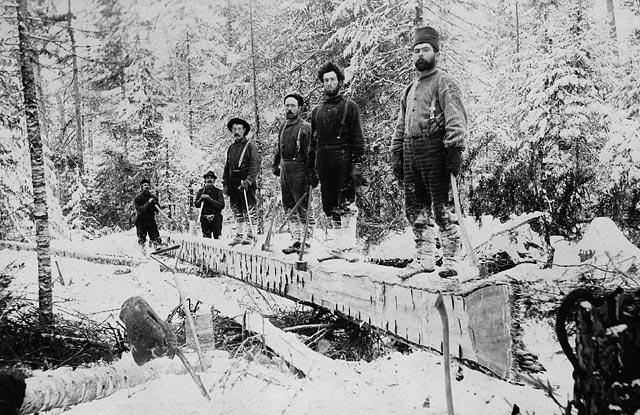
Booth lumber camp, Aylen Lake, Ontario, c. 1895

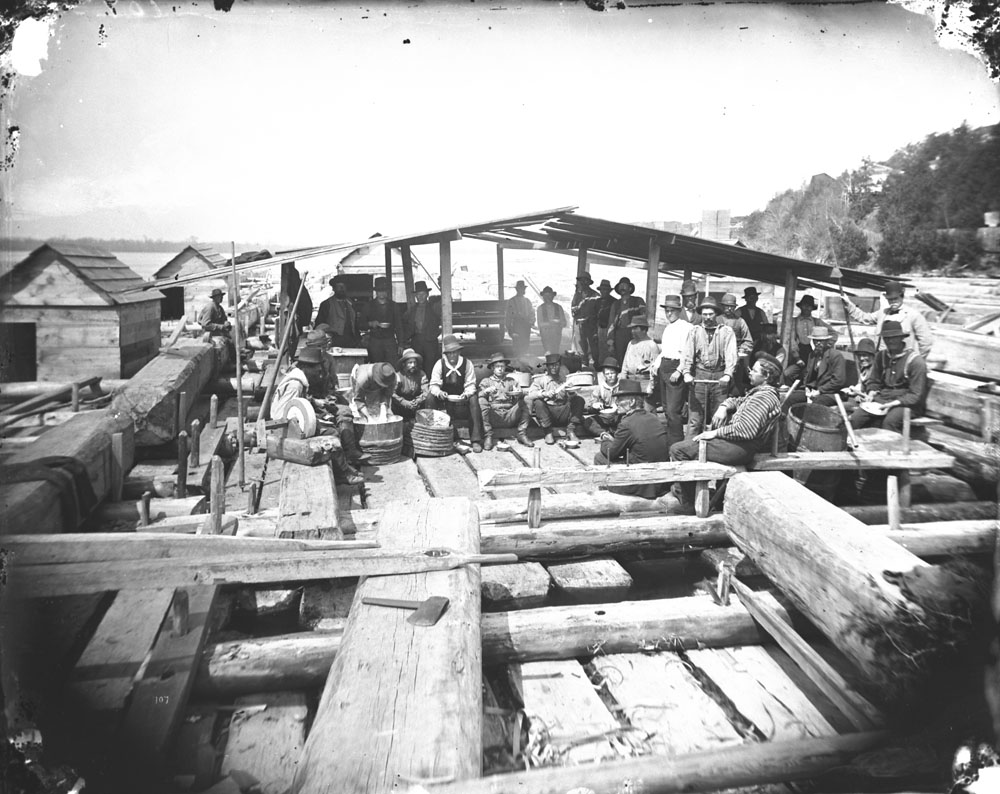
Cookery on Booth timber raft

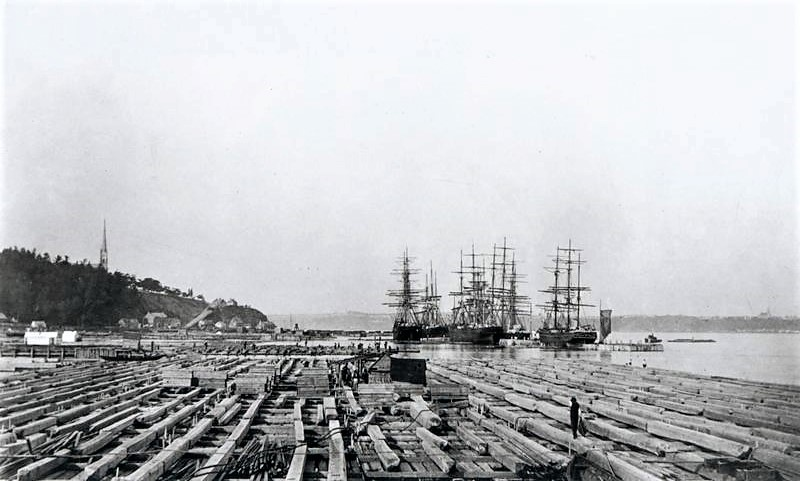
J.R. Booth's timber rafts arriving at Sillery, Quebec,c. 1891

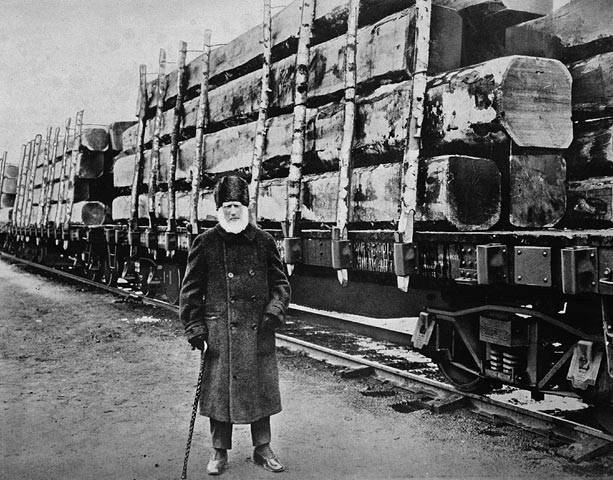
J.R. Booth in front of Canada Atlantic Railway timber train

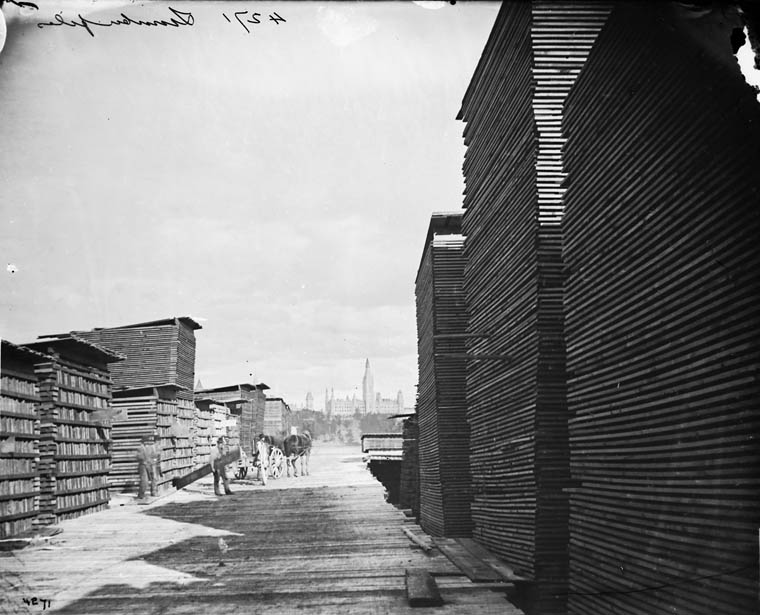
Booth's lumber piling ground

=== Lumber ===
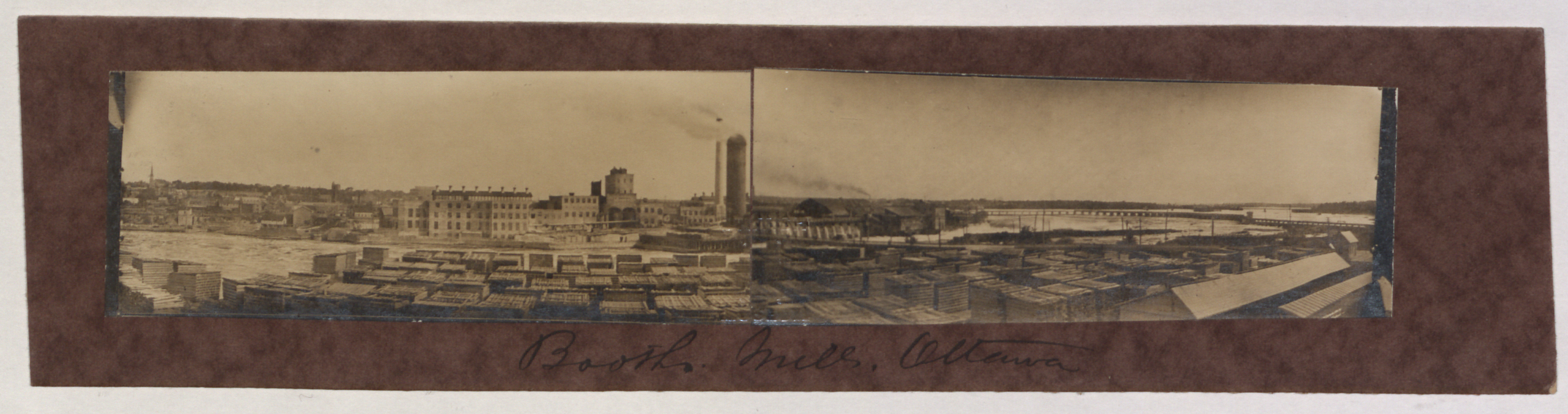
Panoramic view of Booth mills in Ottawa (1912)

Booth harvested timber from the upper Ottawa River and its tributaries, driving them down the river to his mills, and is known to have started logging in the Amable du Fond River and Lake Nosbonsing area in the late 1860s, arriving at Depot Creek in 1870. Booth expanded his timber limits into the Lake Nipissing watershed in 1881. In order to reach his Ottawa mills, Booth constructed the Nosbonsing & Nipissing Railway (length 5.5 miles (8.9 km)) in 1884 to carry sawlogs over the portage from Lake Nipissing to the headwaters of the Mattawa. It was subsequently incorporated as a separate company by Act of the Legislative Assembly of Ontario in 1886.

Booth's vision and boldness were qualities that made him a success. In 1867, he purchased, for $40,000, the timber rights of John Egan's 250 square miles (650 km^{2}) of pine on the Madawaska River in what is now Algonquin Park. Five years later, he refused an offer of more than $1 million to sell those rights.

During the latter half of the 19th Century, he amassed timber rights approaching 7,000 square miles (18,000 km^{2}) in Central and Northern Ontario which he would harvest for his mills. He often went to his Algonquin timber limits in his own private railway car, working beside his men during the day and on business affairs most of the night, seldom sleeping for more than a few hours. He was always on the lookout for opportunities to reduce costs, and in 1894 he began investing in tugboats in order to accelerate the delivery of log booms to the Chaudière mill.

In 1891, Booth installed 13 band saws at his Ottawa mill, which was said to be more than anywhere else in the world. The next year, that mill produced 140 million board feet (about 25,000 cubic feet (710 m^{3})) of lumber. It required the supply of 2 million logs annually in order to run at capacity, and some of his timber limits were so remote that it took up to two years for logs to reach the mill. Booth was so dominant in the industry that he assumed the role of price leader, where all competitors met the prices he set for his product. His leading status would continue until 1919, when William Cameron Edwards and others would achieve greater outputs.

Half of the mills' output was shipped to England; the rest to the United States and throughout Canada. White pine from Booth's lumber yards was used to build the decks on the ocean liners of the Cunard Line, including the Lusitania and Mauretania. In 1905, he constructed a new plant and entered the pulp and paper business, thus being able to use softwood that he had been previously forced to sell. He expanded into the United States through the establishment of docks and a distribution centre at Rouses Point, New York, a planing mill and box factory at Burlington, Vermont, and a sales office in Boston.

The mills' output was so large that its Fraserfield lumber yard and railyard, acquired in 1870, extended along Bronson Avenue as far south as Carling Avenue, backing onto The Glebe.

The Chaudière Island mills were so extensive that Booth issued tokens for use there, which were in circulation from 1893 until the 1940s.

Fire was a constant threat to his mills, and they burnt down in 1893, 1886, 1900 and 1903. In 1900 alone, 100 million feet of lumber was lost to fire, and Booth also lost his home located at Wellington and Preston Street. The extent of the fire led to a controversial proposal to restrict the amount of lumber being held in the yards, but intensive lobbying by Booth and other lumbermen effectively killed that measure as well as a later one in 1903. Much of Booth's personal and business records were lost in these fires. It was also of concern within the timber limits as well, and Booth once said, "If fires are kept out of the forests, there will be more pine in this country 100 years from now than there was fifty years ago, and we shall have lots of timber for the generation to come."

Booth established a hydroelectric generating station at Chaudière Falls in 1909 in order to power his sawmill and planing mill, after fifty years of using penstocks distributed around his property to directly feed the water turbines that powered his machinery. The construction of the station resulted in the water level of the Ottawa River being raised by 10 feet (3 m), which meant the end of log rafting there.

=== Railways ===
Canada Atlantic Railway and predecessors

Ottawa and Parry Sound Railway (1888)
Ottawa, Arnprior and Parry Sound Railway (1891)
Ottawa, Arnprior and Renfrew Railway (1888)
Ottawa, Arnprior and Parry Sound Railway (1896)
Parry Sound Colonization Railway (1885)
Canada Atlantic Railway (1899)
Montreal and City of Ottawa Junction Railway (1871)
Canada Atlantic Railway (1879)
Coteau and Province Line Railway and Bridge Company (1872)

==== Formation of Canada Atlantic ====
Booth's sawmill operations could never run at full capacity because the output could not be carried out of the lumber yards fast enough. Because of these transportation problems in the Ottawa area, Booth became an important participant in the development of Canada's railway system when he purchased the Montreal and City of Ottawa Junction Railway (M&OJ) and the Coteau and Province Line Railway and Bridge Company (C&PL) in 1879, amalgamating them to form the Canada Atlantic Railway. The M&OJ had received a charter to build southeast from Ottawa to Coteau Landing on the north bank of the St. Lawrence River. The C&PL had received a charter to build a bridge across the St. Lawrence River to Valleyfield, Quebec and then operate a railway across southwestern Quebec to the United States border. Due to financial difficulties, neither line had been completed, and Booth worked to complete the entire route by 1882. The Coteau bridge was completed in 1890, thus eliminating the necessity of transshipping cargo by barge. The CAR formed a subsidiary, the Vermont and Province Line Railroad, which would build a line to Swanton, Vermont on the eastern shore of Lake Champlain in 1897, thus connecting Ottawa to the United States via the Delaware and Hudson Railway, the Rutland Railroad, and the Central Vermont Railway.

==== Expansion to Georgian Bay ====
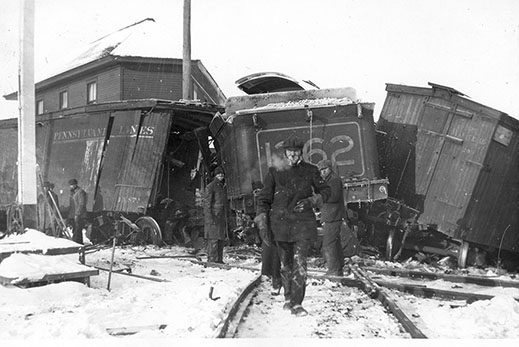
The diamond crossing between the OA&PS and B&O was the site of several collisions over its history, a tribute to its equally stormy building.

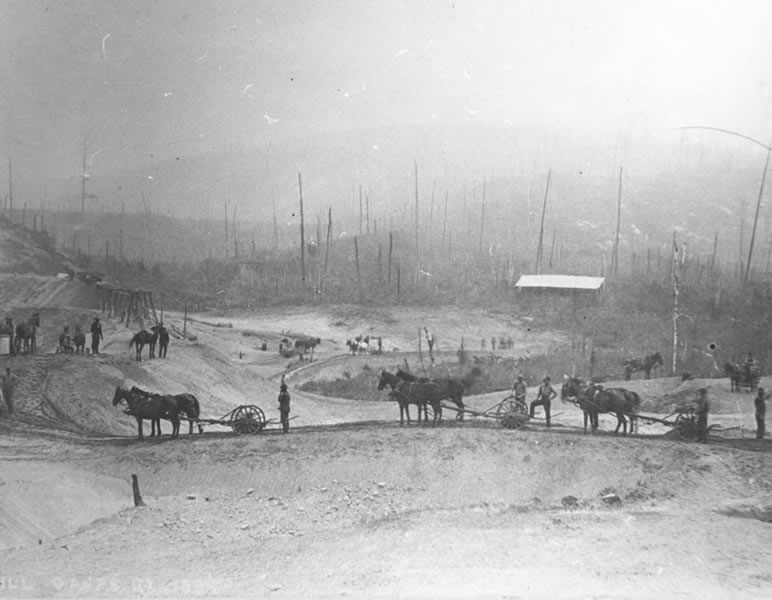
The rough terrain of the Canadian Shield is evident in this photo of the OA&PS being built through the area of today's Algonquin Park. Note the lack of vegetation in what is today completely covered by forest.

In 1888, Booth chartered the Ottawa, Arnprior and Renfrew Railway to build a line from Ottawa to Renfrew, as well as the Ottawa and Parry Sound Railway to do the same from Parry Sound to Renfrew. In 1891, the two lines (together with the Parry Sound Colonization Railway in 1893) were amalgamated into the Ottawa, Arnprior and Parry Sound Railway (OA&PS), which ran from Georgian Bay through southern Algonquin Park to Ottawa.

When the PSCR was taken over by Booth, the original intention was to have its terminus at Parry Sound. However, the high prices demanded by local landowners prompted him to choose a location on nearby Parry Island, which would become Depot Harbour. When completed, Depot Harbour became one of the most prominent ports on the Great Lakes, rivalling Collingwood, Midland and Owen Sound. It was the shortest route for shipping grain to the Atlantic, with trains arriving and departing every twenty minutes.

All three lines met "end to end". The M&OJ met the OA&PS on Booth's sawmill property in Ottawa while the C&PL met the M&OJ in Coteau, using several hundred feet of trackage rights of the Grand Trunk Railway (GTR). In 1899, the OA&PS amalgamated with the CAR. As a result, Booth ruled the largest railway empire built in North America by any one man.

It was said that the first phase of the CAR's construction was undertaken without any government assistance, which was unusual at the time. Booth himself was concerned with building the railways as well as marketing the service to build and maintain tonnage on the new lines. He was open to cooperation with other railways in eastern and western Canada, as well as to sale or amalgamation with a larger railway system, and was contemplating such a sale by 1901. Whether it was because Booth at age 74 was tired, or because he realized that competition from other transcontinental lines would soon cause serious problems for the CAR, he did everything possible in the early years of the 20th century to make every aspect of the railway profitable, and therefore attractive to potential buyers.

Booth also operated grain elevators at Depot Harbour, Coteau, Duluth and Milwaukee, and steamships on the Great Lakes, and formed the Canada Atlantic Transit Company, which operated five large lake freighters on the Upper Great Lakes.

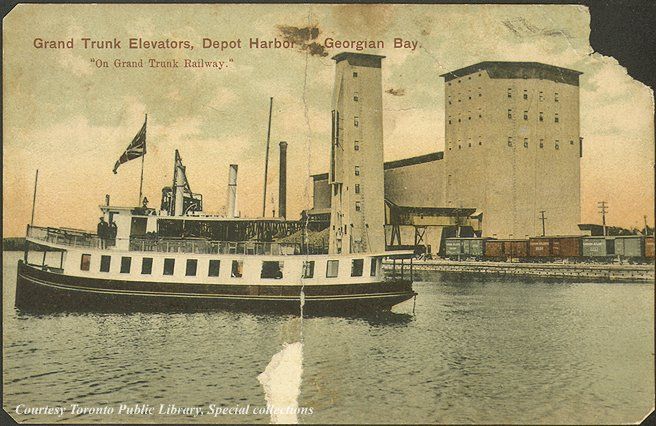
Depot Harbour elevators in 1910

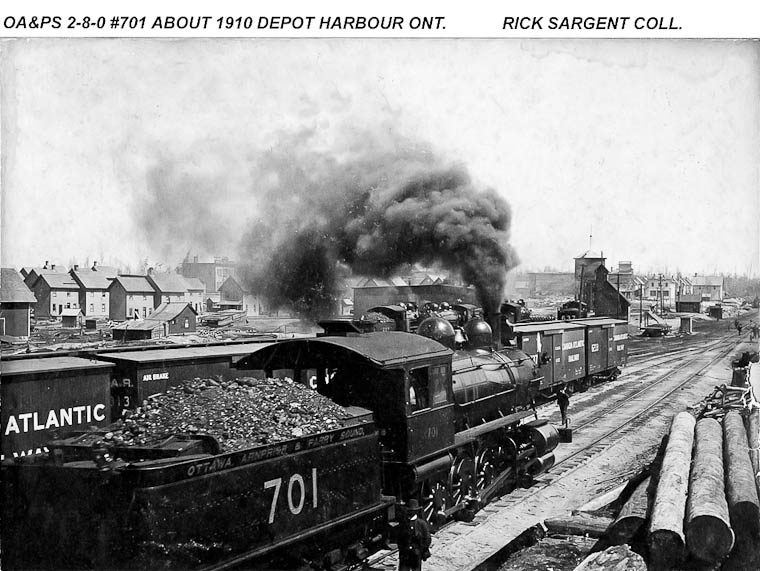
OA&PS engine #701 2-8-0 built by Baldwin Locomotive Works. The engine is shown in Depot Harbour, the western end of the line.

==== Sale to Grand Trunk ====
Prompted by the federal government, the Grand Trunk Railway began negotiating with Booth to acquire the Canada Atlantic as part of the Grand Trunk's efforts to expand into northern Ontario and eventually into Western Canada. In August 1904 the GTR agreed to purchase the Canada Atlantic system, including the Great Lakes steamship fleet and the line in Vermont which connected with its Central Vermont Railway subsidiary. The agreed-upon price for the entire system as well as the Depot Harbour and Ottawa terminals was $16,000,000. The Grand Trunk took over all operations of the CAR on 1 October 1905, but the actual purchase was ratified by Parliament only in 1914. Booth was subsequently one of the GTR's directors until its nationalization as part of the Canadian National Railways in 1923.

=== Other interests ===
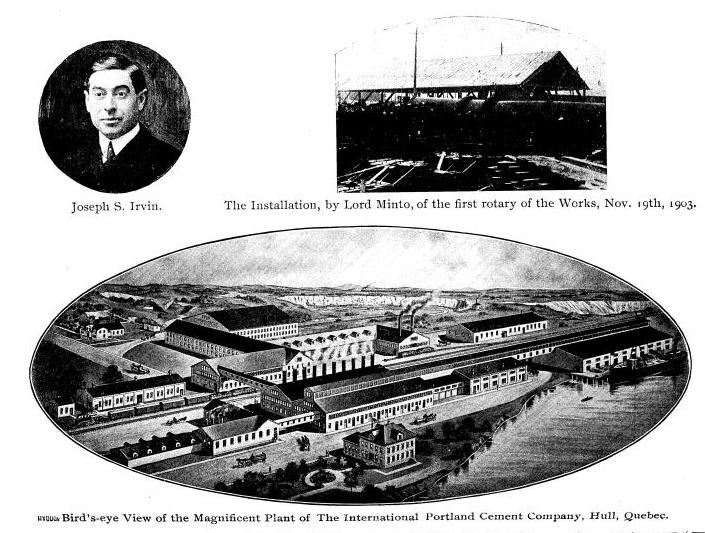
International Portland Cement Company, Hull, Quebec (1904), a predecessor of Canada Cement Company, and one in which J.R. Booth was a significant investor.

At the creation of the Lady Stanley Institute for Trained Nurses in 1890 in Ottawa, he was a member of the Provisional Committee. Later in 1892, he became Life Governor of that same Institute by paying at least the amount of $500.

Booth was a significant investor in the Canada Cement Company formed by Max Aitken, which is now part of Lafarge. He was also a director of Foster-Cobalt Mining which took part in the Cobalt silver rush, whose origin took place on one of Booth's timber limits.

Together with M.J. O'Brien, he also invested in The Dominion Nickel-Copper Company (owner of the Murray Mine) in order to create a potential competitor to International Nickel. It was subsequently sold to Frederick Stark Pearson, William Mackenzie and Donald Mann and became the British America Nickel Corporation, in which Booth was a director. In 1921, Booth was induced to vote in favour of a bondholders' reorganization scheme through the promised issue of $2,000,000 of British American stock. The reorganization was later held by the Ontario courts as not binding on the minority bondholders, and the ruling was upheld by the Judicial Committee of the Privy Council in a decision that has influenced corporate jurisprudence throughout the British Commonwealth. After Inco drove British American into bankruptcy in 1924 by aggressively cutting the price of nickel, it later acquired British American's assets.

=== Later years ===
J. R. Booth continued to run his business empire well into his nineties. Only in 1921 did he convert it from a sole proprietorship into a corporation (known as J.R. Booth Limited). He died in 1925 at the age of 98 after being ill for several months and was survived by his sons Jackson, John Frederick, daughter Helen Gertrude Fleck and several grandchildren and great grandchildren.

In 1943, J.R. Booth Limited, with the exception of its lumber division, was sold to George Weston Limited to become part of the E. B. Eddy Company. The lumber mill was later sold to E. B. Eddy in 1946.

== Other influences ==
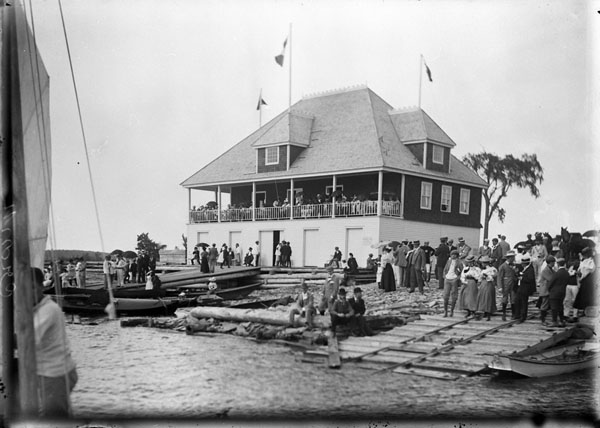
Britannia Bay Boating Club, 1896

Booth's impact was significant on Ottawa:

- The right of way used by the Ottawa, Arnprior and Parry Sound Railway within Ottawa is now used as the Queensway.
- Booth Street in Ottawa (which connects to Hull, Quebec via the Chaudière Bridge), together with rue Booth in Gatineau, Quebec and chemin Booth in Kingsmere, Quebec, were named in his honour.
- J.R. Booth leased a property on Lac Deschênes to the Britannia Bay Boating Club. Designed by Edgar Lewis Horwood, the clubhouse was opened in 1896.
- J.R. Booth donated the land on the southwest corner of Richmond Road and Britannia Road for the Britannia Heights Methodist Church, which had been meeting in homes since 1869. The Britannia Heights Methodist Church formed in 1873.
- The acreage he acquired for pasturing the horses for his mills would later become the Dominion Experimental Farm.
- Booth also had a summer home in Kingsmere, Quebec, on the north shore of Kingsmere Lake.

In Algonquin Provincial Park, Booth Lake is named after him. However, most other traces of Booth's interests in the Park (including a summer retreat at the Barclay Estate on Rock Lake) were razed by the Province of Ontario as their leases on crown land ran out.

Two geographic townships have been named after him. In Quebec, Booth Township was surveyed and established in 1908. It is located east of Kipawa, and is part of the unorganized territory of Les Lacs-du-Témiscamingue in the Témiscamingue Regional County Municipality. In Ontario, Booth Township was surveyed and established in 1962. It is located immediately north of Nipigon in Thunder Bay District.

In 1892, Booth rented a cottage at Saranac Lake, New York, where his daughter would cure for several years. Booth brought a pair of skis with him, thus introducing the sport of skiing to the area.

One of Booth's descendants noted in 2016 that the manner in which his predecessor had gathered his wealth was exceptional in comparison to "really old-school wealthy families" in Canada, "as most of them came from the booze business, which was illegal. So they didn’t pay taxes; it was all cash. So what J.R. did was that much more impressive."

== Death, descendants and legacy ==
Booth died in Ottawa on December 8, 1925. On his passing, Michael Grattan O'Leary of the Ottawa Journal noted that what people should remember about him was that he was:

not the great magnate whose wealth is the envy of many and the wonder of more; but the great pioneer, the man whose genius and imagination tamed the wilderness . . . and, above all, did more than any man of his time to build up this Ottawa Valley.

Also at that time, William Lyon Mackenzie King observed:

Mr. Booth was indeed one of the Fathers of Canada; it is not too much to say that it is to men of such sterling worth and indomitable will as he possessed, more than aught else, that we owe the development of our Dominion.

Booth's fortune was a subject of much speculative commentary during the latter years of his life, with estimates ranging up to $100 million. At his death his estate was officially valued at almost $7.7 million; the property was later re-evaluated upwards to $23 million. Although succession duties of $4.28 million were paid in 1927, in 1937 Ontario Premier Mitchell Hepburn subsequently claimed more and had the Legislative Assembly of Ontario pass the necessary legislation to overcome the legal obstacles. J.R's heirs eventually paid another $3 million in 1939.

His son John Frederick Booth, who lived in Canada, married and had a daughter Lois Frances Booth (born Ottawa, Ontario, 2 August 1897; died Copenhagen, 26 February 1941), who was married in Ottawa, Ontario, on 11 February 1924 to Count Erik of Rosenborg, whom she divorced in 1937; they had two children. At the time of the marriage, it was rumoured that Booth contributed half of her $4-million dowry. J.R. issued a formal denial. She later remarried Thorkild Juelsberg, without issue.

=== Siblings and descendants ===
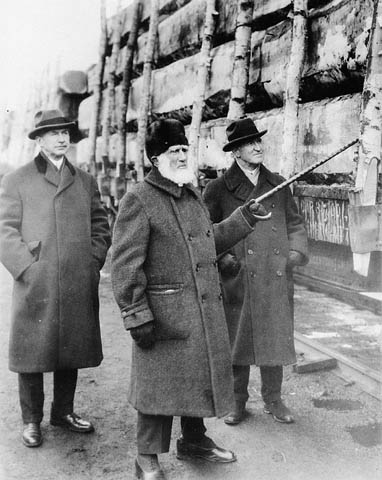
J.R. Booth and sons, c. 1900

Arms of Lois, Countess of Rosenborg

- John Booth (1802–1877), m. (1st) Eleanor Rowley (1804–1834) (2nd) Lydia Bickford (1808–1861) (3rd) Suzannah Bickford (1814–1888)
  - James Rowley Booth (1825–1906)
  - John Rudolphus Booth (1827–1925), m. 1853 Rosalinda Cooke (1829–1886)
    - Frances Gertrude Booth (1854–1856)
    - Helen Gertrude Booth (~1855–1940), m. Andrew Walker Fleck (1848–1924)
    - Lila Booth (1858–1918), m. J. Arthur Seybold (1859–1928)
    - Augusta Adella Booth (1860–1866)
    - Charles Jackson Booth (1863–1947), m. Jessie Louise Gibson (1876–1939)
      - John Frederick Booth (d. in infancy)
      - Charles Rowley Booth (1915–1960), m. Marjorie Annette McKinnon(1920–2003)
        - John Rowley Booth (1944–)
        - William Jackson Booth (1946–)
    - John Frederick Booth (Ontario, 3 June 1865–Ontario, 5 August 1930), m. Frances Alberta Hunsiker (Montreal, Quebec, 1 November 1866–Victoria, British Columbia, 12 February 1964, buried in Beechwood Cemetery, Ottawa Municipality, Ontario), daughter of Jacob E. Hunsicker (Waterloo Township, Ontario, 17 October 1849 - ?) and wife Catharine Bricker (Waterloo City, Ontario, 29 June 1844 - ?)
      - John Rudolphus Booth (1895–1941), m. (1st) Ida Evelyn Woods (1900–) (2nd) Elizabeth Jane Smith (1909–)
        - Pamela Evelyn Booth (1923-2015)
      - Frederick Hunsiker Booth (1895–1941), m. (1st) Louise Taylor (1898–) (2nd) Cornelia Ann Vanderhoef (1911–1995)
        - Elizabeth Ann Booth (1934-)
      - Lois Frances Booth (Ottawa, Ontario, 2 August 1897 – Copenhagen, 26 February 1941). m. (1st) Ottawa, Ontario, 11 February 1924 Count Erik Frederik Christian Alexander of Rosenborg (Copenhagen, 8 November 1890–Copenhagen, 10 September 1950) (2nd) Gunnar Thorkil Juelsberg (1904–1966)
        - Alexandra Dagmar Frances Marie Margrethe, Countess of Rosenborg (1927–1992)
        - Christian Edward Valdemar Jean Frederik Peter, Count of Rosenborg (1932–1997)
    - Frank Booth (1867–1869)
    - May Belle Booth (1876–1899)
  - William Booth (1829–1913)
  - Eliza Booth (1831)
  - Robert Rowley Booth (1832–1899)
  - Louis Elijah Booth (1835–1915)
  - Eleanor Booth (1839–1842)
  - Charlotte Booth (1841–1912)
  - Lucinda Booth (1842–1933)
  - Samuel Armstrong Booth (1844–1920)
  - Isaiah (Isaac) Booth (1845–1928)
  - Edward J. Booth (1846–1849)
  - Edward Judson Booth (1852–1943)

== See also ==
- Booth House
- Fleck/Paterson House
