= Depot Harbour =

Ghost town in Ontario, Canada

Coordinates: 45°18′51″N 80°06′22″W

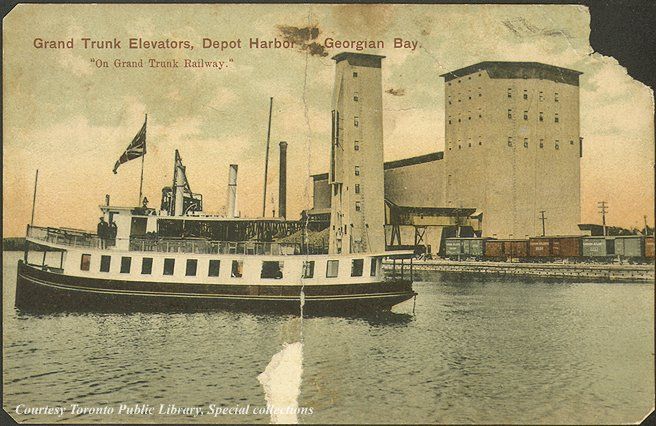
Depot Harbour elevators in 1910

Depot Harbour is a ghost town on Wasauksing First Nation, in the Parry Sound District, Ontario, Canada. It was once the western terminus of the Canada Atlantic Railway and a busy port on Georgian Bay.

== Formation and rise ==
1899 Fire insurance plan of Depot Harbour, Parry Sound District, Ontario

In 1891, the Ottawa, Arnprior and Renfrew Railway and the Ottawa and Parry Sound Railway, two lines controlled by John Rudolphus Booth, amalgamated to form the Ottawa, Arnprior and Parry Sound Railway with authority to execute a further amalgamation with the Parry Sound Colonization Railway. The PSCR was acquired in 1893, forming a railway that would run from Georgian Bay through southern Algonquin Park to Ottawa.

When the PSCR was taken over by Booth, the original intention was to have its terminus at Parry Sound. However, the high prices demanded by local landowners prompted him in 1895 to choose a location on nearby Parry Island, 10 kilometres (6 miles) away. Early that year, Booth's surveyors trespassed on the Indian reserve to run lines from Rose Point Narrows to the site. Taking advantage of a provision of the Indian Act that allowed native-owned land to be expropriated for use as a railway, he negotiated with the Anishinaabe reserve to sell 127 hectares (314 acres) to the railway. A further 45 hectares (111 acres) was acquired by expropriation in 1899.

When completed, Depot Harbour became one of the most prominent ports on the Great Lakes, rivalling Collingwood, Midland and Owen Sound. The Canada Atlantic Railway was the shortest and quickest route for shipping grain to the Atlantic, with trains arriving and departing every twenty minutes, and was known as the best natural harbour on the Great Lakes.

Booth built a town site with 110 houses, along with two large grain elevators, docks, a railway station, a hotel and shops. The town's population reached 1,600 permanent residents in 1926. There may have been as many as 3,000 inhabitants in the summers.

== Decline ==
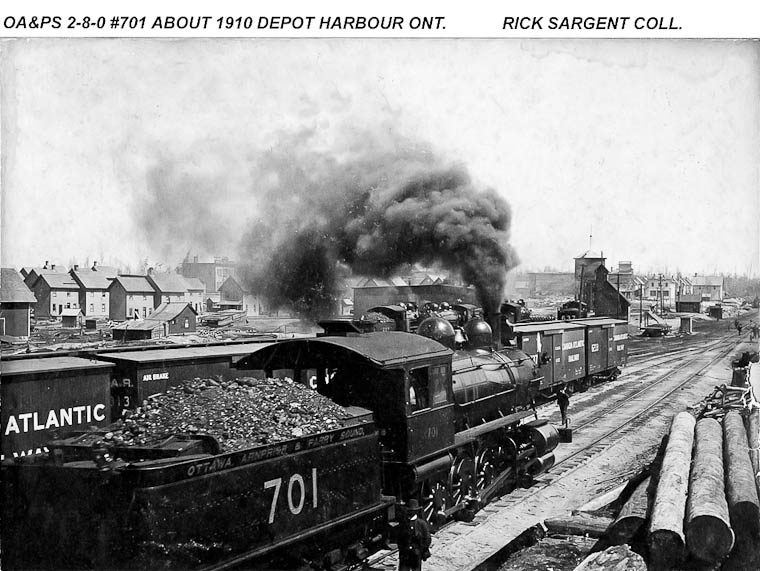
OA&PS engine #701 2-8-0 built by Baldwin Locomotive Works. The engine is shown in Depot Harbour, the western end of the line

Booth sold his railway to the Grand Trunk Railway in 1904. In 1923, the railway became part of the government-owned Canadian National Railways. The reconstruction of the Welland Canal in 1932, along with 1933 abandonment of a portion of the line in Algonquin Provincial Park (as a consequence of the Cache Lake trestle being damaged by ice), and a drop in grain prices during the Great Depression, contributed to a loss of importance for Depot Harbour, and the CNR closed the facilities in favour of its own at South Parry. The town fell into disrepair and as its population gradually declined, Depot Harbour was abandoned.

During World War II, cordite manufactured in nearby Nobel was stored in the railway's dockside freight sheds across the inlet from the grain elevators. In the summer of 1945, the timber frame grain elevators were dismantled. On August 14, as preparations were being made for V-J Day celebrations in other places, the partly dismantled elevators accidentally caught fire. Flying embers carried by the wind, landed on the roofs of the freight sheds, setting off explosives which destroyed whatever remained of the harbour facilities.

By late August 1959, all residential buildings had been removed, with only foundations remaining. After the debris had been cleared away from the site of the burnt-down grain elevators, the wharf was used as a distribution terminal for the Century Coal Company, a subsidiary of Canada Steamship Lines. As the market for coal declined in the late 1950s the docks were silenced once again. By 1959 use of the wharf was acquired by National Steel Corporation for loading pelletized iron ore from its Low Phos Mine at Sellwood. A rail mounted gantry crane was installed along the length of the wharf.

Valley Camp and Edmund Fitzgerald were regular visitors to Depot Harbour. When the mine closed in 1979, Depot Harbour was silenced once more.

The Anishinaabe reclaimed the expropriated lands in 1987. Little remains of the town except scattered foundations. The bank vault can still be found as well as the loading docks. Only one building remains in use as a cottage.

The port is still in use as a fish farm, owned by a local resident on the reserve.
