= Highland Inn =

Hotel in Ontario, Canada

Coordinates: 45.552079°N 78.595740°W

The Highland Inn (1908–1957) was a year-round resort hotel built and operated by the Grand Trunk Railway (GTR), in Ontario’s Algonquin Provincial Park. It was located near the park offices on the northern edge of Cache Lake, and was a focal point for the park for many years. Wishing to return the park lands to a more natural state, the Inn was purchased by the Ontario Government in 1956 and removed. Today all that remains are traces of the concrete stairs and platform that met the CNR line, which was lifted after departure of the last train in 1959.

== Early history ==
The park was established in 1893 as a nature preserve and recreational playground. The railway through the southern and western portions of the park had been built in the 1890s by the Ottawa, Arnprior and Parry Sound Railway (OA&PS), opened for traffic in 1897, and was purchased by the GTR in 1905. Changes to the administration policies of the park since 1893 permitted short-term leases for the construction and the operation of hotels and summer camps to make the park more attractive to tourists.

By 1908, the GTR had become well established in Muskoka, southwest of Algonquin Park, as a resort area which the railway promoted as the "Highlands of Ontario." That year, the Grand Trunk Railway opened its first tourist lodge, the Highland Inn, which was an immediate success.

Located at the Algonquin Park station, near the park headquarters, the Inn was a simple two-story structure with a covered verandah across the front of its main floor, which overlooked Cache Lake. A staircase led from the station platform to the main entrance at the center of the building; there was also an inclined path leading up from the station. In its first years of operation, the hotel proved so popular that land on the west side of Highland Inn was cleared and raised wooden platforms erected, on which tents (supplied by the hotel), were put up to meet the requirements of the rapidly growing tourist trade.

== Enlargement ==
In 1913, the Highland Inn was enlarged and a west wing was built, along with a three-story central tower and an addition to the east side, extending from the rear of the original structure. Only that first section of the hotel, however, was winterized. The number of rooms included 11 with bath and 61 without one. Running water was supplied from a large wooden water tower at the rear of the hotel. Water was also supplied to fire hydrants, while a standpipe at the station serviced steam locomotives.

A canoe livery for rental of canoes and rowboats was built on the shore in front of the hotel. Above the boathouse was a covered dance floor. Other activities for guests included tennis and lawn bowling. There were also large sitting rooms inside and a billiard room for men.

In the same year, Nominigan Camp, consisting of a main lodge with six cabins of log construction, was established on Smoke Lake. Camp Minnesing on Burnt Island Lake was also created as a wilderness lodge with similar accommodations. Open only in July and August, both were built by the GTR as affiliates of the Highland Inn.

With trains running practically to its front door, easy connections could be made from Toronto or Ottawa. The Highland Inn became popular with tourists from major cities of the Atlantic Seaboard. Nominigan Camp and Camp Minnesing were accessible by wagon road. A nominal charge was made for stage service from Highland Inn. Both outpost lodges were accessible by paddle and portage from Joe Lake station. Nominigan Camp on Smoke Lake could also be reached from the Canoe Lake station.

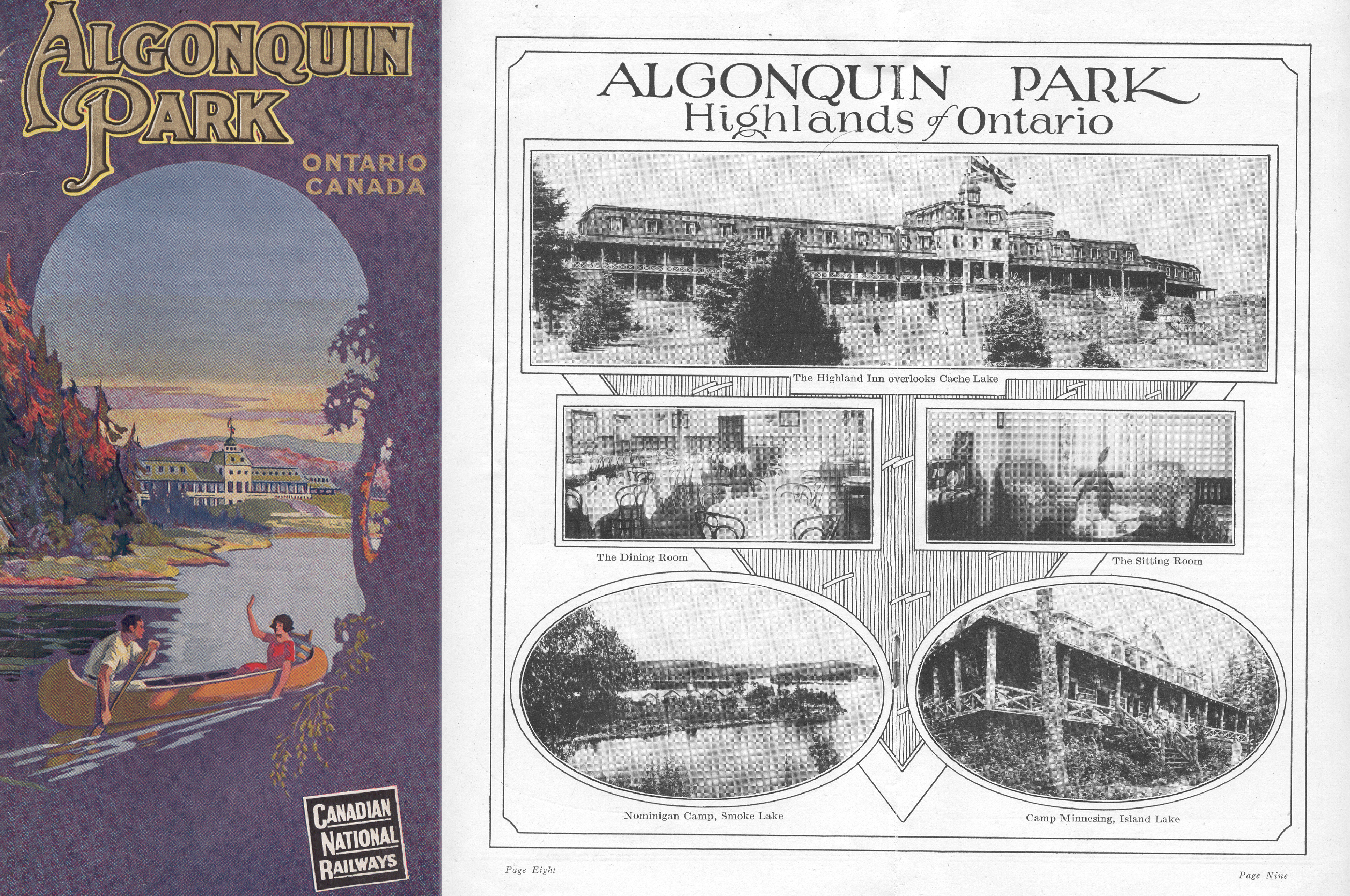
1925 CNR Algonquin Park pamphlet

With the 1923 takeover of the GTR by the Canadian National Railways (CNR), management of the three lodges came under Canadian National Hotels' administration. Like its forerunner, the CNR continued to promote its own hotels, including those acquired from other lines, as well as privately owned hotels, lodges and camps across the railway system.

== Great Depression and closure ==
An accidental fire destroyed some of the guest cabins at Nominigan Lodge in 1926; they were not rebuilt. With the onset of the Great Depression, Camp Minnesing was sold in 1930 to Henry Burton Sharman. Dr. Sharman was a repeat client at the lodge on Burnt Island Lake, having held his annual religious seminars there since 1923. Nominigan Camp was sold in 1931 and became a private cottage. The Highland Inn closed in 1932.

== Reopening ==
Ed and Norman Paget of Huntsville reopened the Inn in 1937. By then, a number of changes had taken place to its surroundings. Through train service between Parry Sound and Ottawa was curtailed in 1933 when a flash flood weakened the footings of a steel trestle on the railway, about 3 km east of the Inn. At the same time, timber trestles on the east end of Cache Lake were condemned. The railway was unable to afford repair costs and the government refused to subsidize it. Instead, a turntable was installed west of Highland Inn, enabling scheduled trains from the west to terminate there and return to Parry Sound. In the 1940s, the CNR continued to include the Highland Inn in its listings in tourist pamphlets.

Construction of a highway through Algonquin Park was started, partly as a relief project for unemployed single men during the Depression. Part of the road covered the old Nominigan wagon road, west of Cache Lake. By 1948, Highway 60 was paved through the park. Advertisements for the Highland Inn began to appear in the Canadian Automobile Association’s Ontario Motor League Road Book.

== Final closure ==
In 1954, a new policy for Algonquin Park was announced that was designed to return the park to its original condition. As part of that policy, the Highland Inn was purchased from Ruth Paget by the Ontario Government in 1956. In the following year, it was dismantled and burned. In its place, a grove of planted red pine trees was placed which is now mature enough to explore under the pine boughs the former site of one of Canada's grand railway hotels. Little else remains except for some foundation remnants and an old staircase with an occasional water pipe protruding from the ground.

== Remains ==
A small interpretive centre consisting of a short section of OA&PS rails and several plaques has been built along the former railway platform. The plaques introduce the history of the Highland, the OA&PS, and changes to the park over time.
