= Nosbonsing and Nipissing Railway =

Short railway in Ontario, Canada

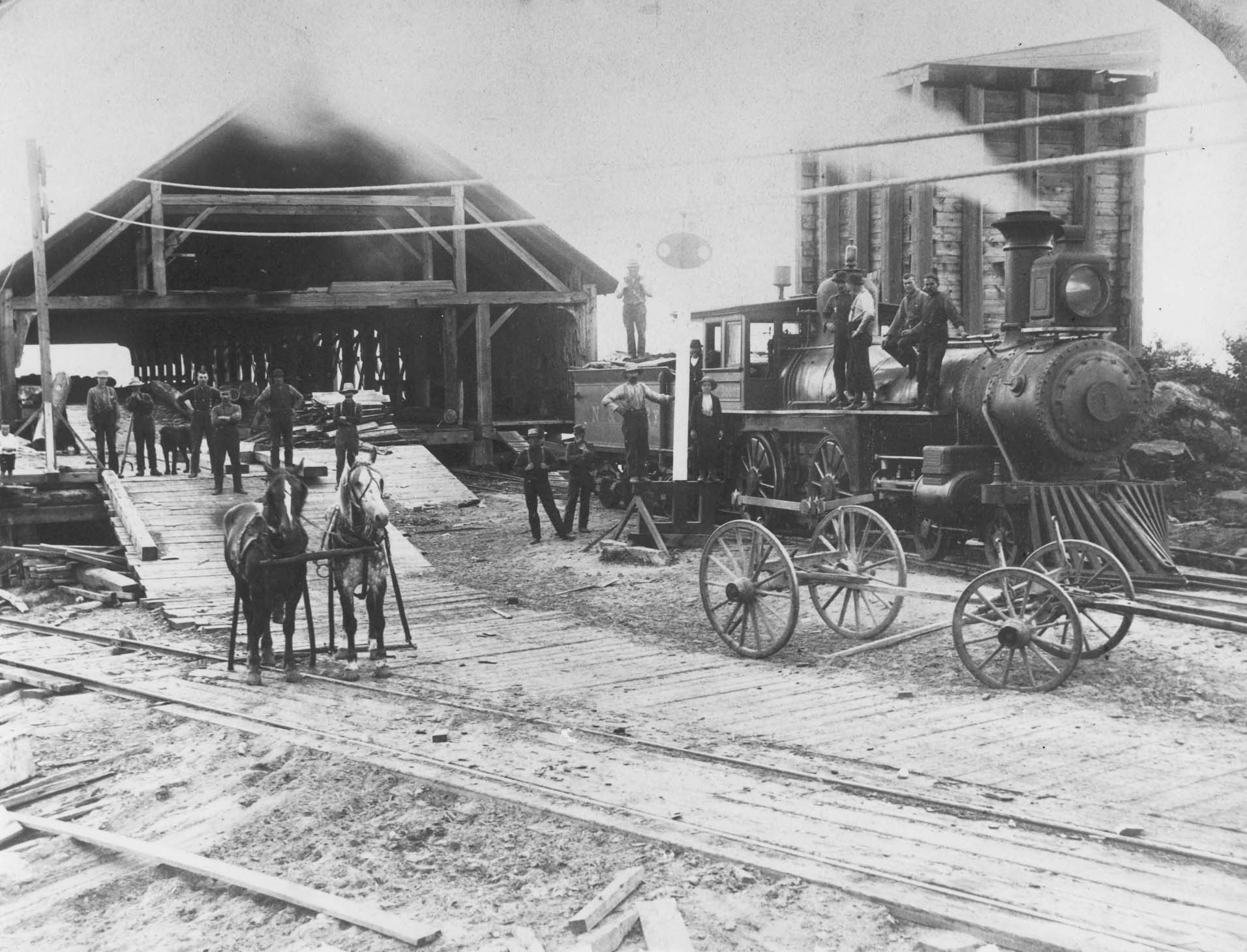
- The N&N's western terminus was this log lift at Lake Nipissing.

Overview
- Reporting mark: N&N
- Locale: Nipissing District, Ontario, Canada
- Dates of operation: 1884–1912
- Successor: Egan Estates Railway

Technical
- Length: 5.5 mi (8.9 km)

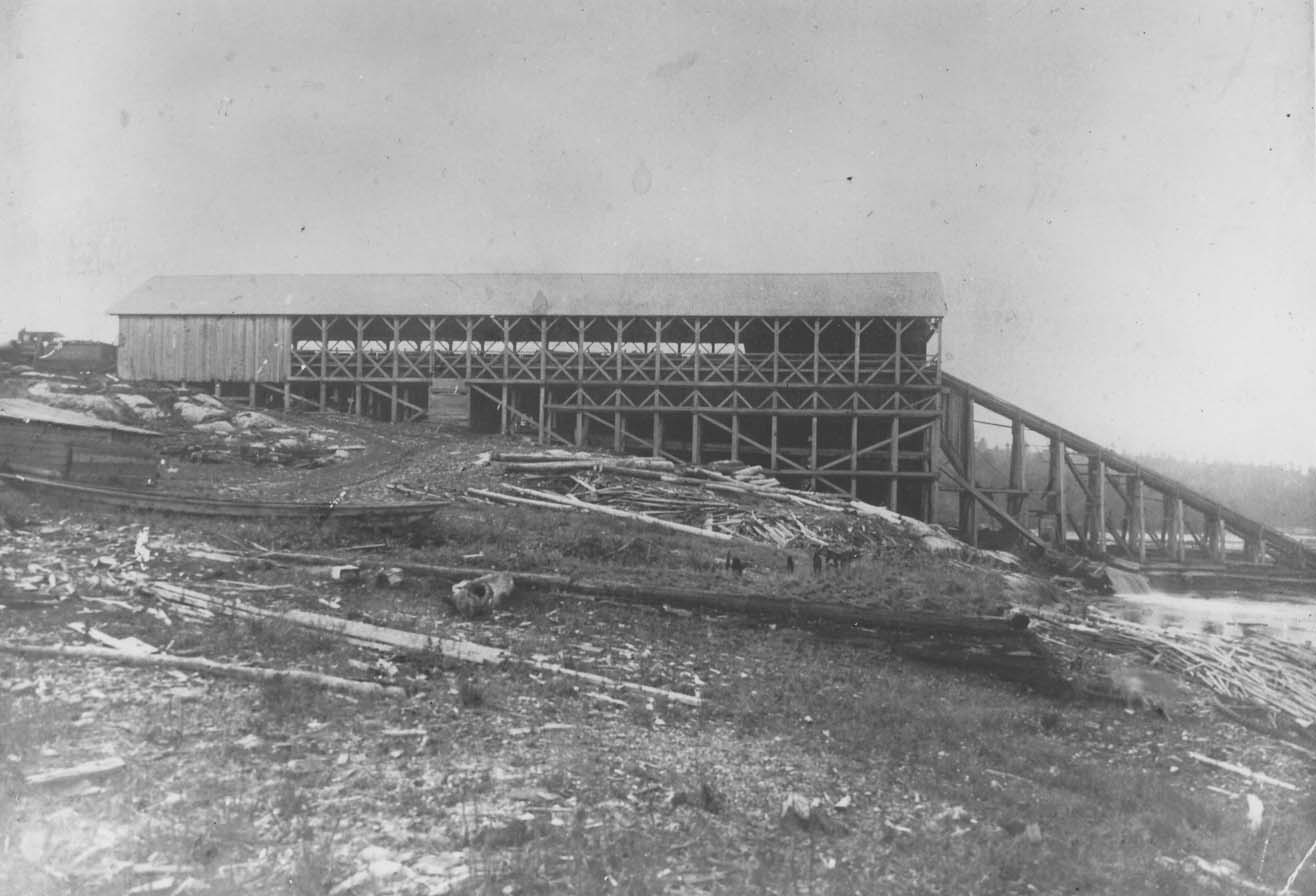
The lift, see here from the north side, was powered by a water wheel in the Wasi River, whose outlet can be seen on the right below the lift.

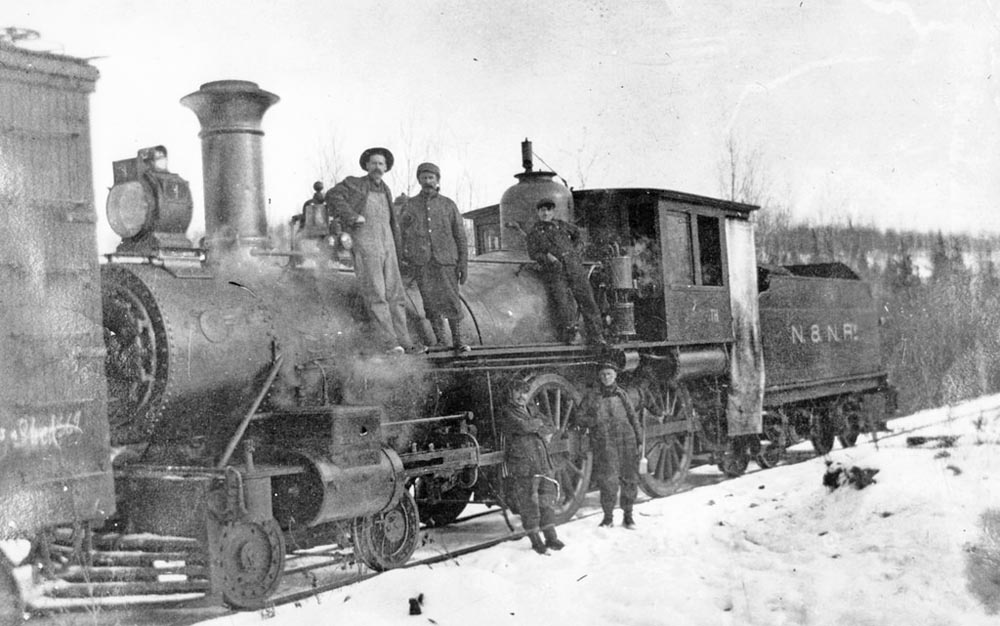
The "JR Booth" was the only engine to work the N&N, an unusually large engine for a lumber railway.

The Nosbonsing and Nipissing Railway (N&N) was a portage railway constructed by Ottawa lumber baron John Rudolphus Booth. The 5.5-mile (8.9 km) line connected Lake Nipissing with Lake Nosbonsing to allow lumber to be portaged onto the Mattawa River, and from there to the Ottawa River. It allowed timber from a wide area across central Ontario to be sent to Booth's mill in Ottawa, at that time the largest sawmill in the world.

== History ==
The line was completed in August 1884 and initially operated as a private line. However, when the Northern and Pacific Junction Railway (N&PJ) began construction of their north-south line in the same area, Booth officially chartered the N&N in March 1886. The N&PJ had already secured crossing rights, but had to renegotiate them with the newly chartered N&N. The N&PJ, the joint project of the Northern Railway of Canada and the Hamilton and North Western Railway, were not amused. Their negotiation position was to threaten to rip up the N&N tracks. Booth responded by purchasing a diamond intersection and giving it to the Northern to install. However, the N&N retained the crossing rights, which allowed them to hold up Northern traffic at their leisure.

Traffic on the line was initially very busy, with the single locomotive hauling a train of 22 flatbed cars back and forth between the two ends. When it arrived at the western end with the empty train, it would drop the empty cars off on a siding, then switch to the mainline to pull eleven filled cars out onto the line, drawing another eleven into the loading station. Once these were loaded the train left for the eastern end while the empty cars are pulled into the station by hand. At the eastern end the logs were simply rolled down into Nosbonsing, the entire operation taking two men only two and a half minutes. Typically ten trips were made per day, with a total of 4,000 logs. The rate increased to 14 a day at one point, at which point the crews went on strike.

This railway was abandoned in 1912 with the ending of major logging operations in the area. The charter of the N&N was transferred to Booth's Egan Estates Railway, near Madawaska. In 1914, the original N&N railbed was used as the basis for Booth Road.

== Route ==
Nipissing is the lower of the two lakes, with a steep embankment on its eastern side that leads upward to a table of land. From there to Nosbonsing the land remains fairly flat. A 150 foot (46 m) long jack ladder was built at Nipissing to haul logs up the 65 foot (20 m) bank into a large loading station, a roofed but otherwise open building 220 by 45 foot (67 m × 14 m). The ladder was powered by a 44 inches (1,100 mm) waterwheel in a large flume with water supplied from the adjacent Wasi River, which also drove a pump when needed for fire fighting or refilling the locomotive.

Today the route has a number of names, starting as Wasi Falls Road at the west end, becoming Route 654 until it crosses Ontario Highway 11 where it becomes Lake Nosbonsing Road, and finally becoming Booth Road again just short of the eastern end at Lake Nosbonsing in the town of Astorville.

== See also ==
- Egan Estates Railway
- Northern and Pacific Junction Railway
- List of Ontario railways
- List of defunct Canadian railways
