= Ontario Highway 11 =

Ontario provincial highway

Highway 11
- A map of Highway 11; Highway 11 Portion decommissioned in 1998

Route information
- Maintained by the Ministry of Transportation of Ontario
- Length: 1,784.9 km (1,109.1 mi)
- Existed: 1920–present

Major junctions
- South end: Highway 400 – Barrie
- Highway 12 – Orillia; Highway 60 – Huntsville; Highway 17 – North Bay; Highway 63 – North Bay; Highway 64 – Marten River; Highway 65 – New Liskeard; Highway 66 – Kenogami Lake; Highway 101 – Matheson; Highway 61 – Thunder Bay; Highway 71 – Fort Frances–Manitou Rapids
- West end: MN 72 – Rainy River

Location
- Country: Canada
- Province: Ontario
- Divisions: Simcoe County, Muskoka, Parry Sound District, Nipissing District, Timiskaming District, Cochrane District, Thunder Bay District, Rainy River District
- Major cities: Barrie, Orillia, North Bay, Temiskaming Shores, Thunder Bay
- Towns: Gravenhurst, Bracebridge, Huntsville, Burk's Falls, South River, Powassan, Temagami, Englehart, Matheson, Cochrane, Kapuskasing, Hearst, Longlac, Geraldton, Nipigon, Fort Frances, Rainy River

Highway system
- Ontario provincial highways; Current; Former; 400-series
← Highway 10	→ Highway 11B
Former provincial highways
Highway 11A →

King's Highway 11, commonly referred to as Highway 11, is a provincially-maintained highway in the Canadian province of Ontario. At 1,784.9 kilometres (1,109.1 mi), it is the second-longest highway in the province, after Highway 17. Highway 11 begins at Highway 400 in Barrie and arches through northern Ontario to the Canada–United States border at Rainy River via Thunder Bay; the road continues as Minnesota State Highway 72 across the Baudette–Rainy River International Bridge. North and west of North Bay (as well as for a short distance through Orillia), Highway 11 forms part of the Trans-Canada Highway and is part of MOM's Way between Thunder Bay and Rainy River.

The original section of Highway 11 along Yonge Street was one of the first roads in what would later become Ontario. It was devised as an overland military route between York (Toronto) and Penetanguishene. Yonge Street serves as the east–west divide throughout York Region and Toronto.

Highway 11 became a provincial highway in 1920 when the network was formed, although many of the roads that make up the route were constructed before the highway was designated. At the time, it only extended between Toronto and north of Orillia. In 1937, the route was extended to Hearst, northwest of Timmins. The route was extended to Nipigon by 1943. In 1965, Highway 11 was extended to Rainy River, bringing it to its maximum length of 1,882.2 kilometres (1,169.5 mi). The southernmost 100-kilometre (62 mi) section from Barrie to Lake Ontario in Toronto (the entirety of Yonge Street and the rest of the route through Barrie) (Note: Since 2026, after a land annexation from Springwater Township, the southernmost 1.1 kilometre of Highway 11 again passes through Barrie) was decommissioned as a provincial highway in 1996 and 1997.

From the late 1940s through the 1960s, numerous bypasses of towns along the route were built, including Orillia, Washago, Gravenhurst, Bracebridge, Huntsville, Emsdale, Powassan, Callander, North Bay, Cobalt, Haileybury, New Liskeard and Thunder Bay. Beginning in the 1960s, the highway was expanded to four lanes between Barrie and North Bay in stages. Four-laning was completed between Barrie and Gravenhurst in the 1960s, between Gravenhurst and Huntsville in the 1970s, and from North Bay south to Callander in the 1980s. The remaining two-lane section between Huntsville and Callander was expanded through the 1990s and 2000s and completed in 2012. A section concurrent with Highway 17 east of Thunder Bay was rebuilt as a divided highway in the early 2010s and work continues. After a structural failure in 2016, the two-lane Nipigon River Bridge was replaced with a twin-span bridge that opened in 2018.

The speed limit is 110 km/h (68 mph) for the freeway portion between Emsdale and South River and ranges from 50 km/h (31 mph) to 100 km/h (62 mph) elsewhere. The route is patrolled by the Ontario Provincial Police (OPP) and maintained by the Ministry of Transportation of Ontario (MTO).

== Route description ==
Highway 11 varies between a divided four-lane urban freeway and a two-lane rural road. It travels through surroundings ranging from cities to farmland to the uninhabited wilderness. The section through northern Ontario includes several sections with no gas or service for over 160 kilometres (99 mi). Significant urban centres serviced by the route include Barrie, Orillia, Gravenhurst, Bracebridge, Huntsville, North Bay, Temiskaming Shores, Cochrane, Kapuskasing, Hearst, Nipigon, Thunder Bay, Atikokan, Fort Frances and Rainy River. It is often paired with Yonge Street in the persistent but incorrect factoid that Yonge Street is the longest street in the world, a claim that was featured in the book of Guinness World Records from 1977 to 1998.

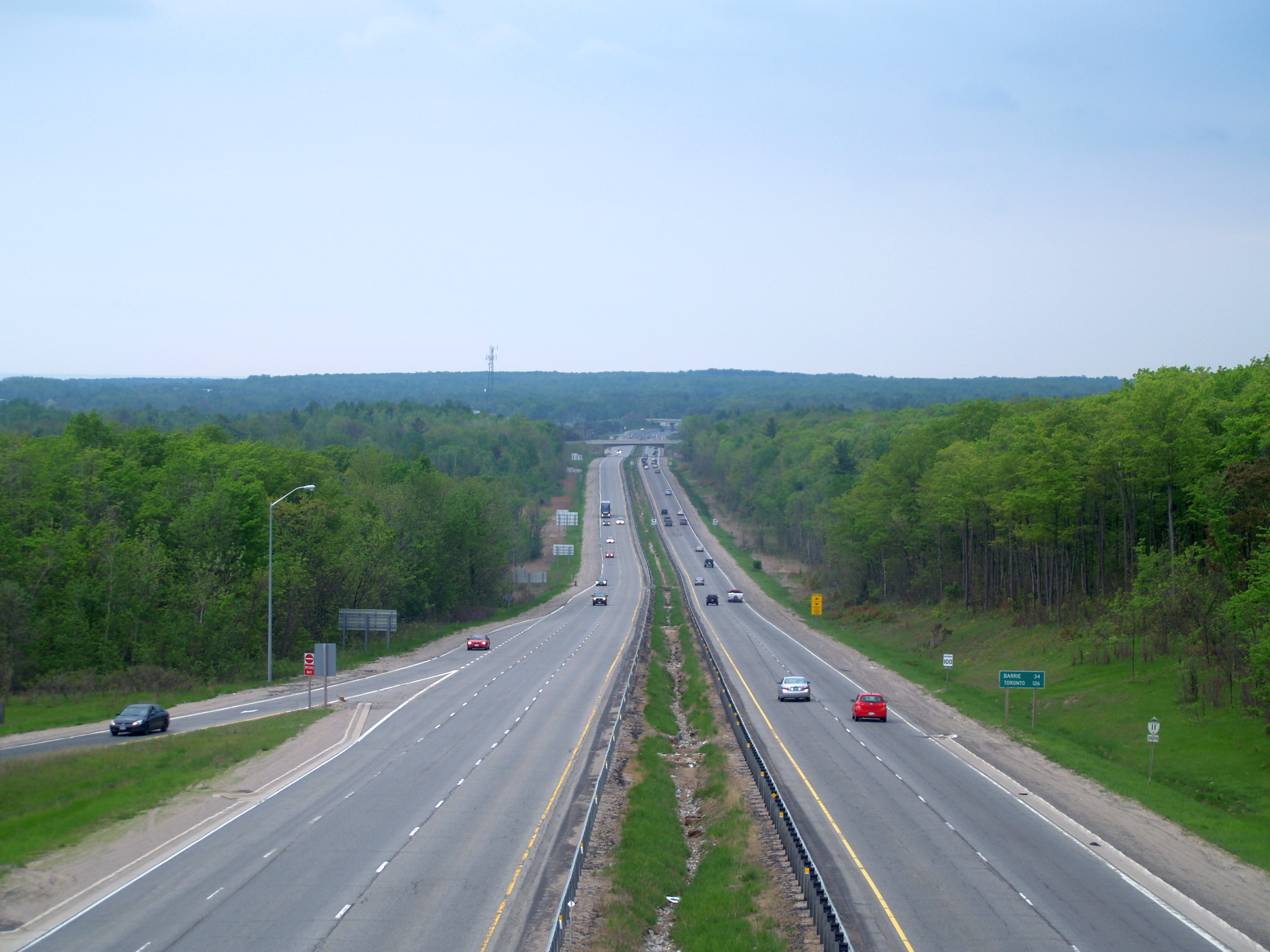
Highway 11 facing south from Highway 12 in Orillia

=== Barrie – North Bay ===
Highway 11 begins at an interchange with Highway 400 on the north side of Barrie, travelling northeast parallel to the northwestern shore of Lake Simcoe. The four-lane route, divided by a median barrier, crosses former Highway 93 (Penetanguishene Road) and passes through a generally flat rural area, though businesses line both sides of the route. At the northern end of Lake Simcoe, the highway enters Orillia, where it is built as a divided freeway. It meets and becomes concurrent with Highway 12 for 2.4 kilometres (1.5 mi). At Laclie Street, the route exits Orillia and returns to a RIRO design with rural surroundings. It travels northward along the western shore of Lake Couchiching as far as Washago, then crosses the Severn River / Trent Severn Waterway.

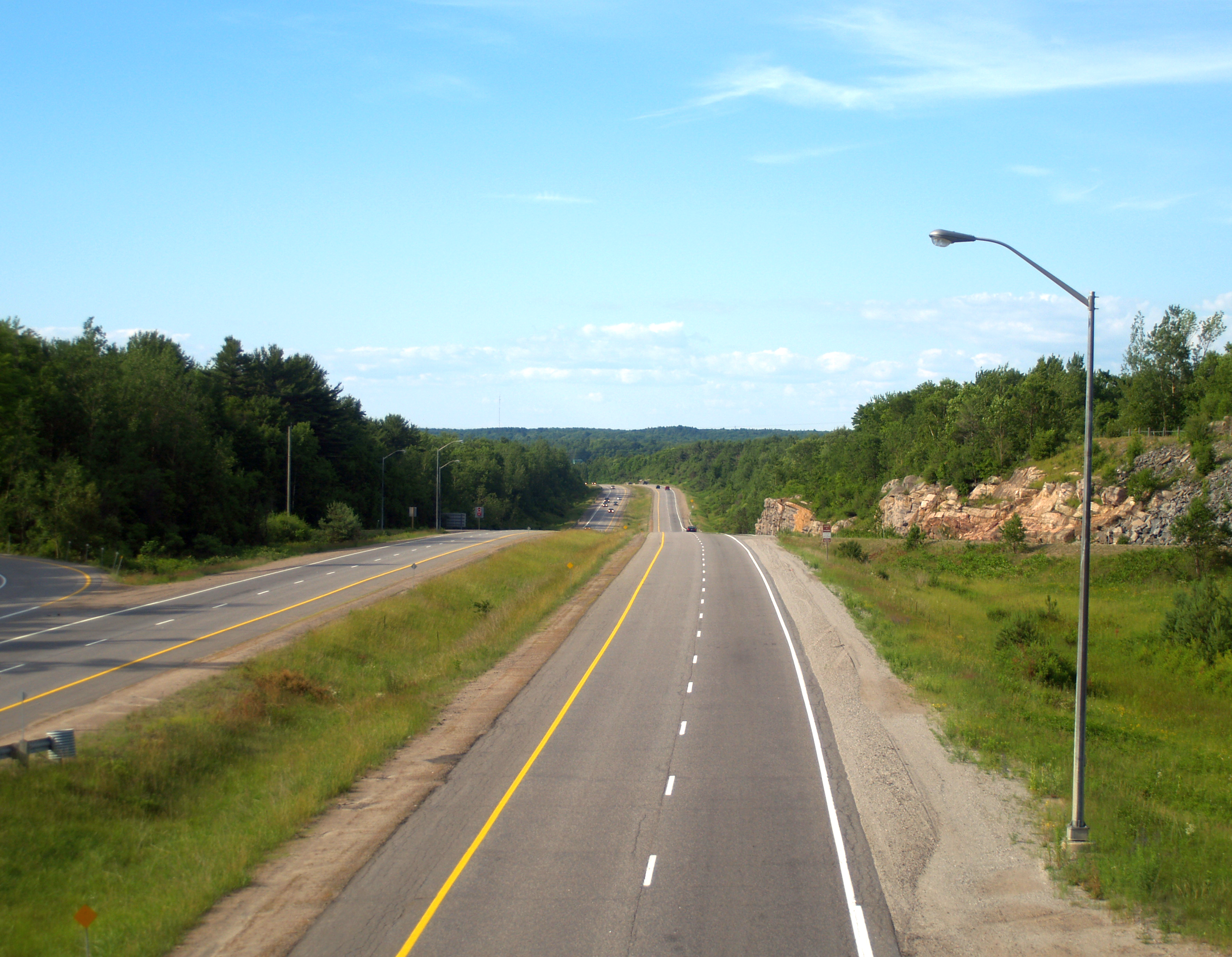
Highway 11 facing north towards Bracebridge

North of the Severn River, Highway 11 travels through the Canadian Shield; large granite outcroppings are frequent and thick Boreal forest dominates the terrain. At Gravenhurst, the highway makes a sharp curve to the east, then becomes a divided freeway again before curving northward around Gull Lake. Near Bracebridge, it meets Highway 118 and former Highway 117. Highway 141 branches west from the route between Bracebridge and Huntsville, while Highway 60 branches east towards Algonquin Provincial Park in Huntsville. The section between Gravenhurst and Bracebridge is at freeway standards, while several at-grade intersections remain between Bracebridge and Huntsville. Highway 11 crosses the 45th parallel north 550 metres (1,800 ft) north of the bridge carrying Highway 118 at interchange 182, just outside Bracebridge.

The 120-kilometre (75 mi) section of Highway 11 between Huntsville and North Bay provides access to the western side of Algonquin Park. It also connects to Highway 518 at Emsdale, Highway 520 at Burk's Falls, Highway 124 at Sundridge and South River, Highway 522 at Trout Creek, Highway 534 at Powassan, and Highway 94 and Highway 654 at Callander. Most of this section is built to freeway standards, although a small number of at-grade intersections remain, primarily between Trout Creek and Callander.

=== North Bay – Nipigon ===
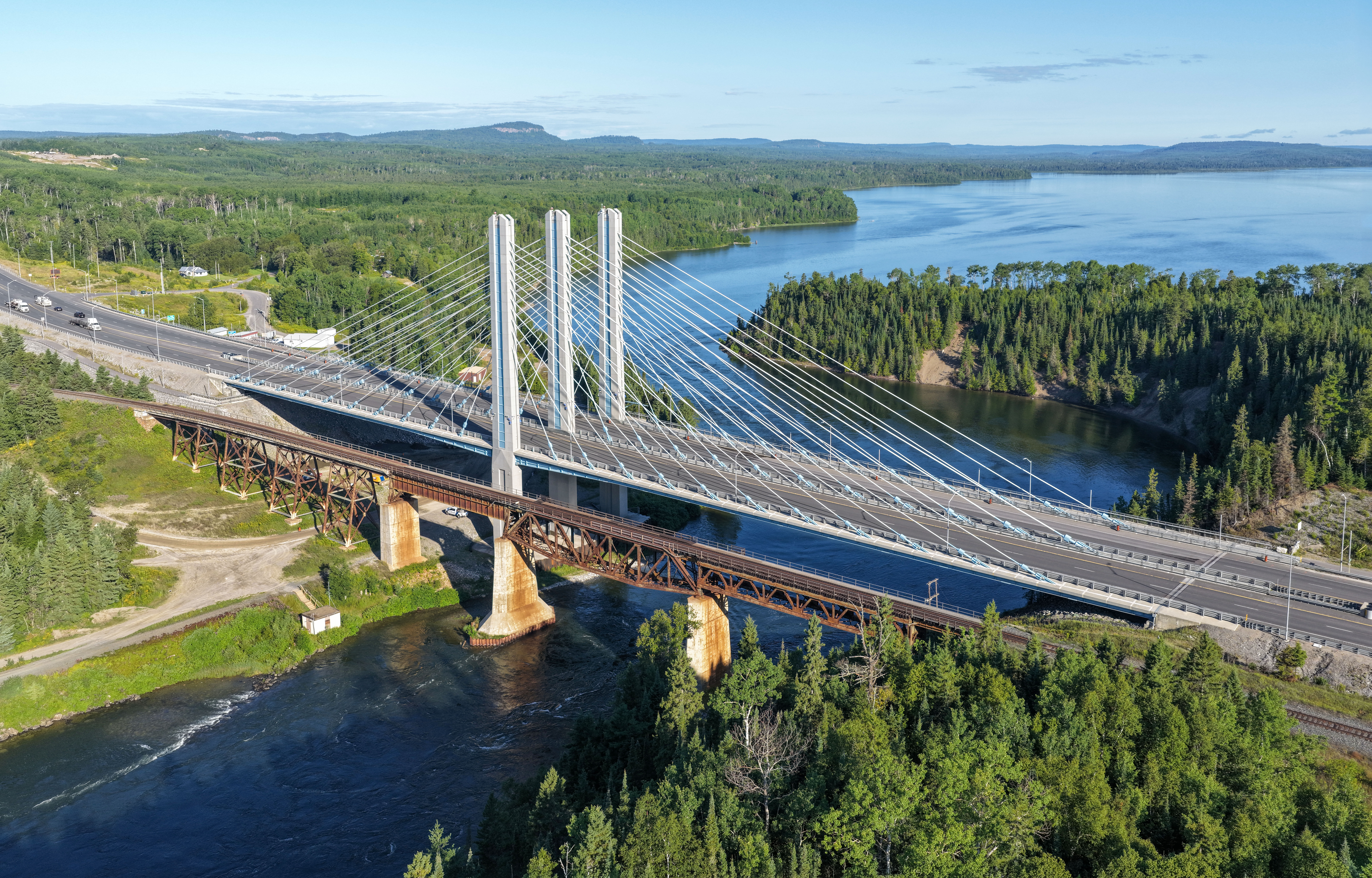
The new Nipigon River Bridge in August 2026

From its junction with Highway 17 at North Bay, the two highways share a concurrency for 4.1 kilometres (2.5 mi) to the Algonquin Avenue intersection, where Highway 17 continues west toward Sudbury and Sault Ste. Marie while Highway 11 turns north onto Algonquin Avenue. Due to a steep incline as it descends Thibeault Hill into North Bay, the southbound Algonquin Avenue segment of Highway 11 features the only runaway truck ramp on Ontario's highway system, which was upgraded in 2009. From North Bay, Highway 11 extends northerly for 370 kilometres (230 mi), passing through communities such as Temagami, Latchford, Temiskaming Shores, Englehart and Matheson en route to Cochrane, where the route turns west. From Cochrane, it passes through communities such as Smooth Rock Falls, Kapuskasing, Hearst and Greenstone, arching across northeastern Ontario westward then south for 613 kilometres (381 mi) before again meeting Highway 17 at Nipigon.

=== Nipigon – Rainy River ===
Nearly the entire route from Nipigon to Rainy River is a two-lane, undivided road, with the exception of two twinned, four-lane segments approaching Thunder Bay. The first starts just west of Nipigon and ends just north of the Black Sturgeon River, for a distance of 10 kilometres (6.2 mi). The second portion reaches a distance of 36 kilometres (22 mi), from Highway 587 at Pass Lake to Balsam Street in Thunder Bay. Work is being done to twin the route from Ouimet to Dorion. Additionally, the section from Balsam Street to the Harbour Expressway is four lanes wide, but undivided. The partial cloverleaf interchange at Thunder Bay's Hodder Avenue is the only interchange in Northwestern Ontario.

Highway 11 and 17 run concurrently from Nipigon down to Thunder Bay, a distance of approximately 90 kilometres (56 mi), where they swing west on the Shabaqua Highway, encountering Kakabeka Falls several kilometers later. The highway then runs in a northwestern direction to Shabaqua Corners, where the two highways split; Highway 17 continues northwest to Dryden, Kenora, and to Winnipeg, Manitoba (via PTH-1), while Highway 11 continues in a generally west direction, eventually reaching Highway 11B at Atikokan, approximately halfway between Thunder Bay and Rainy River. The highway continues for 132 kilometres (82 mi), crosses the Noden Causeway, and reaches Fort Frances, where Highway 71 runs south across the U.S. border to International Falls. From here, Highway 11 shares a concurrency with Highway 71 for 37 kilometres (23 mi) until the latter branches north after Emo, while Highway 11 runs parallel to the border for 51 kilometres (32 mi) before approaching the town of Rainy River, where the roadway continues into Baudette, Minnesota, United States, and ends at Minnesota State Route 11.

=== Business routes ===
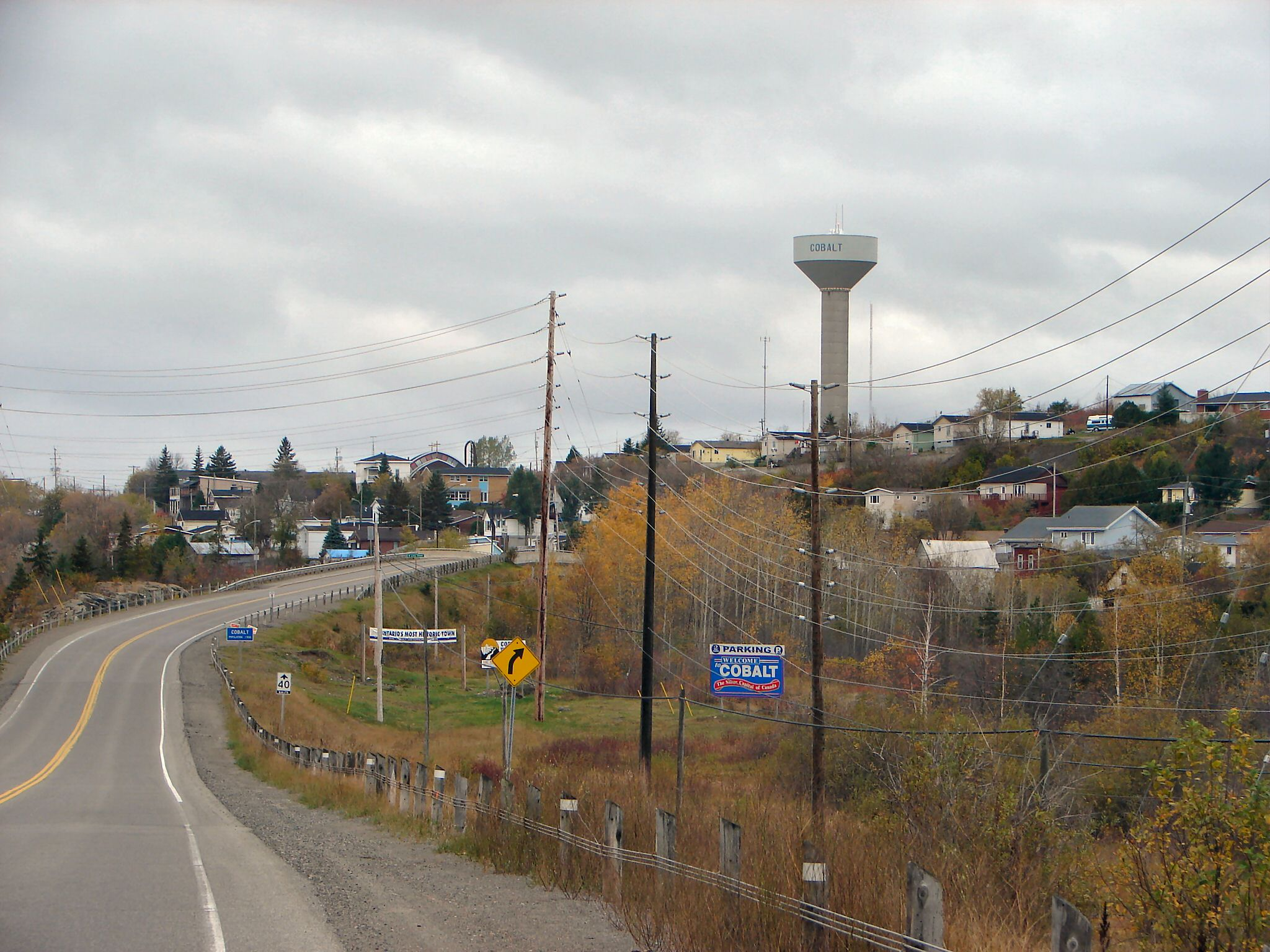
Former Highway 11B entering Cobalt

Highway 11B is the designation for business routes of Highway 11, ten of which have existed over the years. Two continue to exist today, while the remaining eight have been decommissioned. With the exception of the short spur route into Atikokan, all were once the route of Highway 11 prior to the completion of a bypass alignment. All sections of Highway 11B have now been decommissioned by the province with the exception of the Atikokan route and the southernmost section of the former Tri-Town route between Cobalt and Highway 11.

- Highway 11B (Holland Landing)
- Highway 11B (Orillia)
- Highway 11B (Gravenhurst)
- Highway 11B (Huntsville)
- Highway 11B (Powassan)
- Highway 11B (North Bay)
- Highway 11B (Cobalt–Temiskaming Shores)
- Highway 11B (Matheson–Porquis Junction)
- Highway 11B (Thunder Bay)
- Highway 11B (Atikokan)

== History ==
=== Predecessors ===
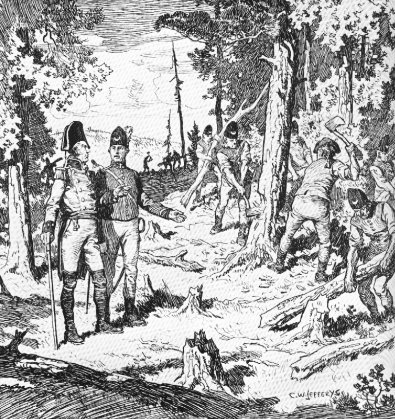
John Graves Simcoe supervising the Queen's York Rangers cutting trees during the construction of Yonge Street, 1795

The earliest established section of Highway 11 is Yonge Street in Toronto and York Region, though it is no longer part of it. Yonge Street was built under the order of the first Lieutenant-Governor of Upper Canada (now Ontario), John Graves Simcoe. Fearing imminent attack by the United States, he sought to create a military route between York (now Toronto) and Lake Simcoe. In doing so, he would create an alternative means of reaching the upper Great Lakes and the trading post at Michilimackinac, bypassing the American border.

In late 1793, Simcoe determined the route of his new road. The following spring, he instructed Deputy Surveyor General Augustus Jones to blaze a small trail marking the route. Simcoe initiated construction of the road by granting land to settlers, who in exchange were required to clear 33 feet (10 m) of frontage on the road passing their lot. In the summer of 1794, William Berczy was the first to take up the offer, leading a group of 64 families north-east of Toronto to found the small settlement of German Mills, in today's Markham. By the end of 1794, Berczy's settlers had cleared the route around Thornhill. However, the settlement was hit by a series of setbacks and road construction stalled.

Work on the road resumed in 1795 when the Queen's Rangers took over. They began their work at Eglinton Avenue and proceeded north, reaching the site of St. Albans on February 16, 1796. Expansion of the trail into a road was a condition of settlement for farmers along the route, who were required to spend 12 days a year to clear the road of logs, subsequently removed by convicted drunks as part of their sentence. The southern end of the road was in use in the first decade of the 19th century, and became passable all the way to the northern end in 1816.

For several years the Holland River and Lake Simcoe provided the only means of transportation; Holland Landing was the northern terminus of Yonge Street. The military route to Georgian Bay prior to, and during the War of 1812, crossed Lake Simcoe to the head of Kempenfelt Bay, then by the Nine Mile Portage to Willow Creek and the Nottawasaga River. The Penetanguishene Military Post was started before the war. However, lacking a suitable overland transport route, passage from York to Lake Huron continued via the Nottawasaga. The Penetanguishene Road, begun in 1814, replaced this route by the time the military post was opened in 1817.

Highway 11 facing northeast from the junction with the Penetanguishene Road at Crown Hill in 1931, shortly after being paved with concrete

In 1824, work began to extend Yonge Street to Kempenfelt Bay near Barrie. A northwestern extension was branched off the original Yonge Street in Holland Landing and ran into the new settlement of Bradford before turning back north towards Barrie. Work was completed by 1827, making connections with the Penetanguishene Road. A network of colonization roads built in the 1830s (some with military strategy in mind) pushed settlement northeast along the shores of Lake Simcoe and north towards the shores of Georgian Bay. Construction of the Muskoka Road began by the 1860s. The road, which penetrated the southern skirts of the Canadian Shield and advanced towards Lake Nipissing, reached as far as Bracebridge by 1861, and to Huntsville by 1863. It was officially opened when it reached Lake Nipissing in 1874. Further extensions into Northern Ontario would await the arrival of the automobile, and consequent need for highway networks.

=== Assumption and paving ===
Highway 11 was initially planned as a trunk road to connect the communities of Southern Ontario to those of Northern Ontario, as a continuous route from Toronto to North Bay. In 1919, Premier of Ontario Ernest Charles Drury created the Department of Public Highways (DPHO), though much of the responsibility for establishing the route he left to minister of the new cabinet position, Frank Campbell Biggs. By linking together several previously built roads such as Yonge Street, Penetanguishene Road, Middle Crossroad and the Muskoka Road—all early colonization roads in the region—a continuous route was created between Toronto and North Bay; however, the new department's jurisdiction did not extend north of the Severn River. Roads north of that point were maintained by the Department of Northern Development (DND).

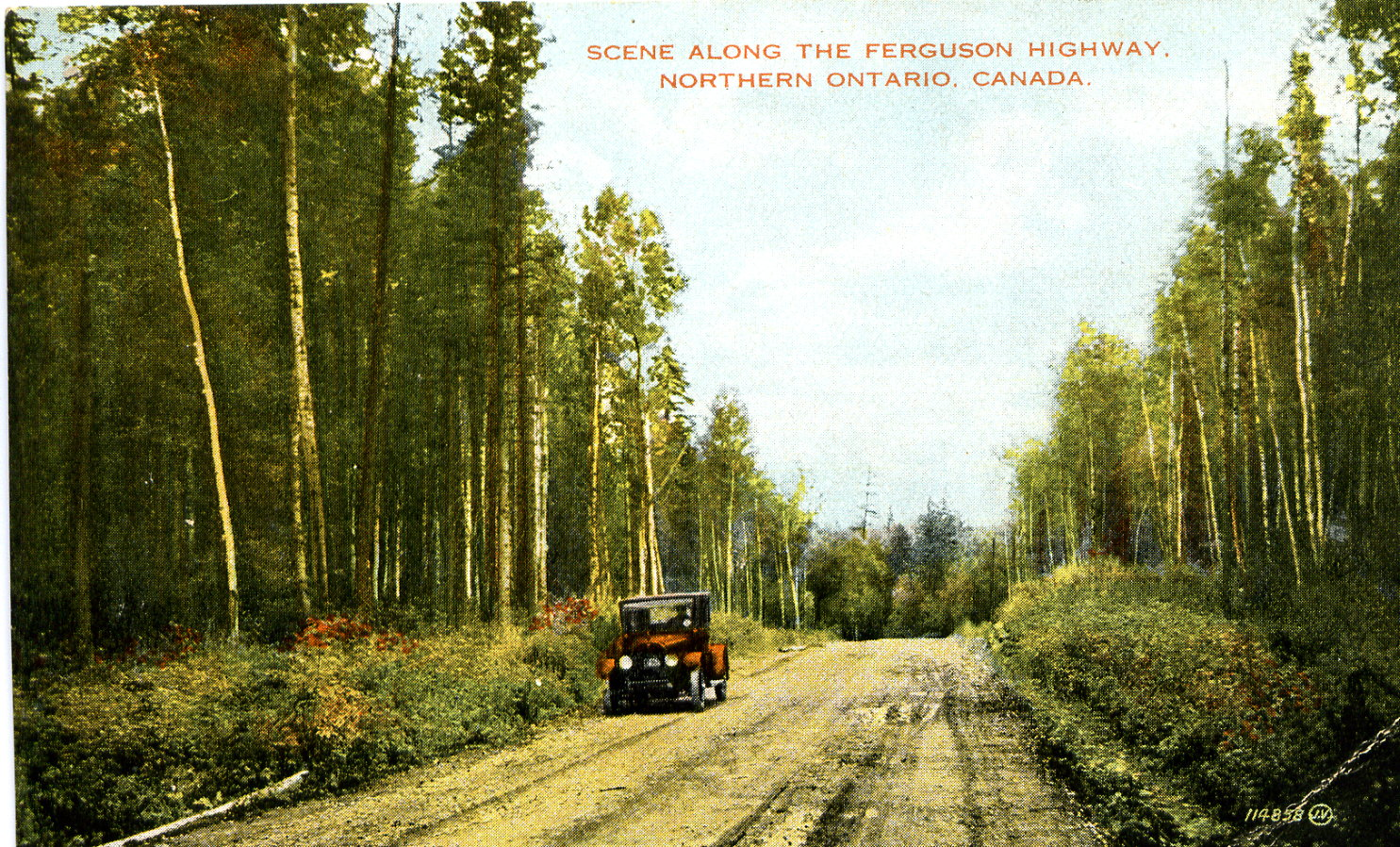
1927 postcard of the Ferguson Highway

In order to be eligible for federal funding, the DPHO established a network of provincial highways on February 26, 1920. What would become Highway 11 was routed along Yonge Street, its extension to the Penetanguishene Road, and the Muskoka Road as far as the Severn River. The portions of Yonge Street through what is now York Region, as well as Toronto as far south as Yonge Boulevard, were assumed by the DPHO on June 24, 1920, while the portions through Simcoe County, from Bradford to Severn Bridge were assumed two months later on August 18. It received its numerical designation in the summer of 1925.

The new route was mostly unpaved, with work beginning in 1922 to improve the roadway. That year saw paving completed between Yonge Boulevard and Thornhill, as well as a bypass of the original route through Holland Landing (now known as York Regional Road 83). The pavement was extended farther north from Thornhill to Richmond Hill the following year. By 1925, the route was paved from Toronto north to Fennell, as well as between Orillia and Washago. An additional 5 kilometres (3 mi) north from Fennell were paved in 1926. In 1927, the pavement between Toronto and Barrie was completed with the paving of approximately 16 kilometres (10 mi) south from Barrie. Between Barrie and Orillia, paving began in 1929, with the completion of approximately 13 kilometres (8 mi) east from Guthrie; at that point the highway turned north at 11th Line, then east at East Oro along Sideroad 15/16. That year also saw paving completed from Washago to north of Gravenhurst. The following year, the newly-renamed Department of Highways (DHO) paved the remaining 13 kilometres between Barrie and Guthrie, while the DND paved the Muskoka Road from Gravenhurst to Huntsville. The final 7.6 kilometres (4.7 mi) of unpaved road between Barrie and Orillia was completed in 1931.

=== Ferguson Highway and extension to Nipigon ===
The southern entrance to Bracebridge in 1930. This arch bridge, completed that year, was along the Ferguson Highway at the time. Today, this bridge is located on Muskoka District Road 16 (Eccleston Drive), and is over a kilometre from the modern Highway 11.

Throughout the 1910s and early 1920s, various chambers of commerce, rotary clubs and boards of trade petitioned the government to construct a new trunk road from North Bay towards the mining communities to the north that were established in the prior decades. These delegations and committees also saw the potential tourist draw of opening the Temagami area to hunters, fishers, and recreational tourism. By 1923, a road existed between Cobalt and Kirkland Lake, as well as between Ramore and Cochrane, with an approximately 32-kilometre (20 mi) gap separating the two sections. Conservative leader Howard Ferguson promised to build a road to connect North Bay and Cochrane during the 1923 Ontario general election, which saw him elected as premier.

The route of the new road between North Bay and Cobalt was cleared by April 1925, after which construction began in August from both North Bay as well as Cobalt. The new gravel highway was officially opened on July 2, 1927, by Minister of Lands and Forests William Finlayson. He suggested at the opening that the road be named the Ferguson Highway in honour of premier Ferguson. The name was originally suggested by North Bay mayor Dan Barker. Despite the official opening, a section between Swastika and Ramore wasn't opened until August. The Ferguson Highway name was also applied to the Muskoka Road between Severn Bridge and North Bay. Although the route from North Bay to Cochrane was passable, it was not an adequate road in many places. Construction continued for several years to build bypasses of sharp turns, steep grades, awkward rail crossings, and other obstacles. The Ferguson Highway was extended from Cochrane to Kapuskasing by 1930, and later to Hearst in 1932.

Construction camps such as this were built along the 247-kilometre (153 mi) gap between Geraldton and Hearst. Several housed prisoners who were put to work on clearing the route of the highway.

The Provincial Highway Network was radically overhauled in 1937, when the DND merged with the DHO on April 1. Consequently, the DHO assumed responsibility of roads north of the Trent–Severn Waterway over the next several months. On June 2, 339.2 kilometres (210.8 mi) of the Ferguson Highway was assumed by the DHO through Cochrane District. This was followed one week later when 80.5 kilometres (50.0 mi) of the Muskoka Road through the District of Muskoka were assumed on June 9. A 96.7 kilometres (60.1 mi) portion of the route, which included a portion of what is now Highway 94 to connect to the Dionne quintuplets, was assumed through Parry Sound District on June 16. On June 30, 136.9 kilometres (85.1 mi) of the Ferguson Highway were assumed north of North Bay within Nipissing District, as well as 182.1 kilometres (113.2 mi) through Timiskaming District. Highway 11 grew in length from 154.2 kilometres (95.8 mi) to 1,024.0 kilometres (636.3 mi).

Construction began in 1938 on a road to connect Highway 17 at Nipigon with the gold mines discovered near the town of Geraldton several years earlier. Although portions of this new road were passable by the end of 1939, the Nipigon–Geraldton Highway was opened ceremoniously by Thomas McQuesten and C. D. Howe on September 7, 1940; it was assumed as a provincial highway in 1941. With the onset of World War II, the need for an east–west connection across Canada became imperative, and construction began on a link between Geraldton and Hearst, a distance of 247 kilometres (153 mi) in 1939. Due to the shortage of labour, several prison camps were established between the two communities in October of that year and work began to clear a tote road for the movement of supplies over the following winter. While the highway was completed in November 1942, it was not maintained during through the winter, and the official opening did not take place until June 12, 1943. Following this, Highway 11 was extended to Nipigon, and was 1,421.1 kilometres (883.0 mi) long.

=== Thunder Bay – Rainy River ===
Highway 120 in 1955 at the French River in Quetico Provincial Park

Highway 11 ended at Nipigon until the late 1950s, after construction of a new highway west from Thunder Bay towards Fort Frances began. During World War II, large deposits of iron ore were discovered at Steep Rock Lake, around which the town of Atikokan was developed. The need to connect the burgeoning community to the road network became apparent following a rail strike in August 1950, during which a "mercy train" was delivered to the isolated town. Throughout the fall of 1950, various delegates pressed the provincial government to construct a road link immediately. The province announced plans for the new highway between Atikokan and Shebandowan the following August, and released the proposed route on October 10; construction began shortly thereafter. The Atikokan Highway was ceremonially opened by premier Leslie Frost on August 13, 1954, although traffic had used the incomplete road beginning in November 1953. At that event, which saw him use an axe to cut a ribbon, Frost announced the future vision to extend the new route to Fort Frances. Despite the opening, work was ongoing to improve the existing road between the end of the new highway at Shebandowan and Highway 17 at Shabaqua Corners.

Initially this road was designated as Highway 120. In 1959, it was decided to make this new link a westward extension of Highway 11. On April 1, 1960, Highway 11 assumed the route of Highway 120; this consequently created a concurrency of Highway 11 and 17 between Nipigon and west of Thunder Bay. Now reaching as far as Atikokan, construction of a road between there and Fort Frances was carried out over the next five years. The final link, the 5.6-kilometre (3.5 mi) Noden Causeway over Rainy Lake, was opened on June 28, 1965, after which Highway 11 was extended to Rainy River and the American border. Highway 11 was now at its peak length of 1,882.2 kilometres (1,169.5 mi).

=== Lakehead Expressway ===
In 1963, Charles MacNaughton, minister of the Department of Highways, announced plans for the Lakehead Expressway to be built on the western edge of the twin cities of Port Arthur and Fort William (which amalgamated in 1970 to form Thunder Bay). Plans called for a 28.2 kilometres (17.5 mi) at-grade expressway from South of Arthur Street to meet Highway 11 and Highway 17 northeast of the cities. Work began in August 1965, with a contract for a 5 kilometres (3 mi) section of divided highway on the west side of the twin cities. The first section of the expressway opened on August 29, 1967, connecting Oliver Road (then part of Highway 130) and Golf Links Road with Dawson Road (Highway 102). By mid- to late 1969, the route had been extended to Highway 527 northeast of the twin cities and to Highway 11 and Highway 17 (Arthur Street) at the Harbour Expressway. By late 1970, the route had been extended southward from Arthur Street to Neebing Avenue / Walsh Street West. At this time, Highway 11 and 17 and Highway 61 were rerouted along the completed expressway. The old routes through Thunder Bay were redesignated as Highway 11B/17B and Highway 61B.

=== Expansion and rerouting ===
As a result of provincial downloading of highways to municipalities in 1996 and 1997, Highway 11 now begins at the "Crown Hill" interchange with Highway 400 north of Barrie. Previously it extended south to Lake Ontario in Toronto, mostly along Yonge Street

While Highway 11 was extended farther north and west between the 1920s and 1960s, numerous projects took place along the sections between Barrie and Cochrane during that period to either realign the highway to improve the geometry, or to bypass built up areas. The largest bottleneck along the highway in the 1940s was between Washago and through Gravenhurst, where construction began in 1947 to realign 23 kilometres (14 mi) between the two towns, including a new high-level bridge over the Trent–Severn Waterway. The original bypass of Gravenhurst, along what is now Bethune Drive, opened in 1948, while reconstruction of the remainder of the route between Washago and Gravenhurst was completed in 1949.

To the south, improvements between Barrie and Orillia, including a divided four-lane highway around the latter, were completed by 1955. During that period, a two-lane bypass around Washago was built between 1954 and 1955. Similar bypasses were built between Barrie and North Bay over the next decade, which were later incorporated into the modern four-lane route. A bypass of Bracebridge opened July 1, 1953. The North Bay bypass was completed in 1953, while bypasses of Emsdale and Powassan were completed 1956 and 1957, respectively. Construction of the Huntsville Bypass began in 1957; it opened November 27, 1959. The original Callander Bypass, which is now divided into Callander Bay Drive and part of Highway 94 also opened in October 1959. Further north, the 19-kilometre (12 mi) Tri-Town Bypass, from Gillies to north of New Liskeard, was opened on September 18. The new route bypassed the towns of Cobalt, Haileybury and New Liskeard (the latter two which have since become part of Temiskaming Shores). In several cases, the original route of Highway 11 became a business route (Highway 11B, see #Business routes) upon the completion of a bypass.

Beginning in 1965 Highway 11 was widened to a divided four-lane route between Orillia and North Bay. Initially, this work began at the southern end and progressed northwards; work later began southwards from North Bay. The first section to be four-laned was 8.0 kilometres (5.0 mi) north of Orillia, which was completed in October 1964, while the remaining 5.6 kilometres (3.5 mi) north to Severn River was completed by the end of 1965. Construction continued north of Severn River, with a 7.1-kilometre (4.4 mi) section—including a second bridge over the Severn River—opening as far north as Kahshe Lake in October 1966. Construction on the next 8.6 kilometres (5.3 mi) from Kahshe Lake to south of Gravenhurst began that year. The current 6.8-kilometre (4.2 mi) bypass of Gravenhurst, crossing Gull Lake, was announced on March 31, 1966, and construction began in the spring of 1967. The new bypass was completed and opened in late 1970.

By 1971, Highway 11 was a four lane divided highway from Orillia to the northern interchange with Bethune Drive in Gravenhurst, and work was underway on twinning the highway between Gravenhurst and then-Highway 117 (now Highway 118), north of Bracebridge; That project was completed by 1974. Between then and 1979, widening was completed to 7.4 kilometres (4.6 mi) north of Highway 141 at Stephenson Road 12 along the existing route of Highway 11, and underway for another 4.3 kilometres (2.7 mi) to the southern end of the Huntsville Bypass.

=== Downloading and four-laning Huntsville to Powassan ===
Map of Highway 11 four laning by date, arranged from north to south: (Click on map for interactive features) Two lane Highway 11 in 1985 September 1997 (Powassan–McGillvray Creek) October 1999 (McGillvray Creek–Trout Creek) October 2, 2002 (Trout Creek Bypass) October 30, 2004 (Trout Creek to South River) September 20, 2011 (Sundridge / South River Bypass) August 8, 2012 (Burk's Falls–Sundridge) August 8, 2012 (Burk's Falls Bypass) Late 2010 (Katrine–Burk's Falls) Week of October 21, 2005 (Highway 518–Katrine) Late 2002 (Melissa–Highway 518) September 2001 (Huntsville–Melissa)

In 1996 and 1997, the care (or rescinding of Connecting Link agreements) of Highway 11 from Barrie southwards, including all of Yonge Street, was transferred by the provincial government to county, regional, and city governments by the Ministry of Transportation of Ontario as part of the Mike Harris government's Common Sense Revolution. This practice is called downloading, in that the financial burden will fall to a lower tier government. The entire 36 kilometres (22 mi) of Highway 11 within York Region was transferred to the region on April 1, 1996. This was followed up a year later with the transfer of 27.3 kilometres (17.0 mi) of the highway within Simcoe County south of Crown Hill on April 1, 1997. Along with the name Yonge Street, the section in York Region is now York Regional Road 1, while the section in Simcoe County is now mostly Simcoe County Road 4. Within the Cities of Toronto and Barrie it is simply either Yonge Street or the sections of various streets the highway followed.

By 1997, the four-laning of Highway 11 reached to approximately 2.5 kilometres (1.6 mi) north of Highway 60, where an interchange was built in 1992, as well as from North Bay south to Powassan. A continuous construction project was carried out over the next 15 years to widen the remaining 93 kilometres (58 mi) between Huntsville and Powassan. A 7-kilometre (4.3 mi) project to twin the existing two lane highway between Powassan and McGillvray Creek opened in September 1997. This was followed in October 1999 with the opening of another 5-kilometre (3.1 mi) of twinning from McGillvray Creek south to Hummel Line, north of Trout Creek.

In the early 2000s, several more sections were completed at both the north and south end of the remaining two lane highway. A 4-kilometre (2.5 mi) section was opened in September 2001 north of the Huntsville Bypass to south of Novar, mostly along a new alignment alongside the existing highway. On October 3, 2002, the southbound lanes of the 7-kilometre (4.3 mi) Trout Creek Bypass, a new alignment around that town, were opened, followed by the northbound lanes two weeks later. An additional 13-kilometre (8.1 mi) of twinning was completed by the end of that year between Novar and south of Emsdale.

In 2003, a major failure of the Sgt. Aubrey Cosens VC Memorial Bridge at the Montreal River in Latchford caused a complete closure and significant detour. A temporary one-lane Bailey bridge, which opened two weeks after the incident, was constructed to carry traffic on the highway; due to the expected water levels on the Montreal River once ice and snow began to melt in the spring, however, a second temporary bridge then had to be constructed for the duration of the original bridge's reconstruction. According to the Ministry of Transportation's final report, the failure was caused by a fatigue fracture of three steel hanger rods on the northwest side of the bridge. Following reconstruction, the bridge resumed service in 2005. Each hanger rod was replaced with four cable wires, to provide greater stability in the event of a wire failure.

On October 30, 2004, another 10 kilometres (6.2 mi) of four-laning was opened between the south end of the Trout Creek Bypass and north of South River. To the south, a 6-kilometre (3.7 mi) bypass of Emsdale opened the week of October 21, 2005, with a portion of the original Emsdale Bypass (constructed in 1956) remaining as Highway 518. This left a 41-kilometre (25 mi) gap remaining to be four-laned; by 2009, construction was underway on 36 kilometres (22 mi). A 7.5-kilometre (4.7 mi) section from south of Burk's Falls to south of Katrine was four-laned by late 2010, mostly along a new alignment. The 17-kilometre (11 mi) Sundridge–South River Bypass opened to traffic on or about September 20, 2011, along a new alignment. The final two projects, twinning the Burk's Falls Bypass and a new alignment alongside the existing highway between Burk's Falls and Sundridge, were completed and opened together on August 8, 2012, completing the four laning between Barrie and North Bay. Overall, the project between Huntsville and Powassan required "16 new interchanges, 54 new bridges, 1.7 million cubic meters of rock excavation, 10.5 million cubic metres of earth excavation, 4.6 million tonnes of granular material applied and 500,000 tonnes of asphalt."

=== Since 2010 ===
Map of Highway 11/17 four laning by date, arranged from west to east: (Click on map for interactive features) August 17, 2012 (Hodder Avenue–Highway 527) Week of September 29, 2014 (Highway 527–Mackenzie River) July 2013 (Mackenzie River–Birch Beach Road) September 1, 2017 (Birch Beach Road–Highway 587) To be completed in 2026 (Highway 587–Pearl Lake) In detailed design (Pearl Lake–Ouimet) Completed late 2023 (Ouimet–Dorion) In detailed design (Dorion–Highway 582) In detailed design (Highway 582–Coughlin Road) In detailed design (Coughlin Road–Red Rock Road No. 9) September 2019 (Red Rock Road No. 9–Stillwater Creek) Unannounced (Nipigon 4+1 widening) 2019 (Nipigon River Bridge and approaches)

Plans for four-laning Highway 11/17 from the end of the Thunder Bay Expressway northeast to Nipigon, including the Nipigon River Bridge, were first announced in December 1989. The corridor was divided into four segments, and an Environmental Study Report (ESR) was published for each in 1996 or 1997. While the MTO designated the corridor—a mix of twinning the existing highway and a new alignment—in 2003, funding wasn't committed to the project until the late 2000s. In early-to-mid 2009, the provincial government announced the first of several contracts to expand the highway, starting from the Thunder Bay end. Construction on the 4.4-kilometre (2.7 mi), $42-million contract began in August 2010, from west of Hodder Avenue to Highway 527. The westbound lanes opened the weekend of August 6, 2011; the existing highway was then rebuilt as the eastbound lanes, and opened on August 17, 2012. An interchange at Hodder Avenue—the first in Northwestern Ontario—was included as part of this project

By 2012, construction was already underway on two more contracts: A $46-million project to twin 12.3 kilometres (7.6 mi) of the existing highway between Highway 527 and west of Mackenzie Station Road that began in 2010, and another 12.3-kilometre project built along a new alignment east of that point to Birch Beach Road. The latter project was completed first, opening in July 2013, while the former was opened the week of September 29, 2014.

Construction began in 2013 on a new four lane cable-stayed bridge across the Nipigon River, to replace the existing two lane bridge built in 1974. The southern span to carry the future westbound lanes was opened on November 28, 2015, after which the old bridge closed. It was subsequently demolished to allow the construction of the northern span to carry eastbound traffic, which was scheduled for 2017. However, on January 10, 2016, the bridge experienced a significant structural failure in which the deck raised 60 centimetres (2 ft), severing the only highway connection between eastern and western Canada. A single lane was reopened the following day and repairs began; both lanes were reopened on February 25, 2016. The failure caused a significant delay in the construction of the northern span, which did not open until November 23, 2018, The 2.5 kilometres (1.6 mi) of approaches at each end were completed in 2019.

On June 10, 2015, the province announced the awarding of two contracts: A $32.7 million contract awarded to twin 5.7 kilometres (3.5 mi) of the existing highway from Birch Beach Road to Highway 587 near Loon, and an $84.8 million contract to construct a new 9.7-kilometre (6.0 mi) alignment from Red Rock Road No. 9 to Stillwater Creek near Nipigon. Construction began on the former in October, and on the latter by the end of June. The section from Birch Beach Road to Highway 587 was completed on September 1, 2017, while the section from Red Rock Road No. 9 to Stillwater Creek was completed in September 2019.

== Future ==
Work is ongoing or upcoming to twin or realign the remaining 55 kilometres (34 mi) of two-laned Highway 11/17 between Thunder Bay and Nipigon. On December 8, 2020, a $71-million contract was awarded for a mix of twinning and a new alignment for 7.9-kilometre (4.9 mi) from Superior Shores Road south of Ouimet to south of Dorion Loop Road near Dorion. Construction started a few weeks earlier at the end of November. The project is scheduled for completion in September 2023. On July 11, 2022, 4 kilometres (2.5 mi) of the new eastbound lanes opened from Ouimet Canyon Road to Superior Shores Road. The remainder of the eastbound lanes, from Ouimet Canyon Road to Dorion Loop Road, are scheduled to open by the end of the year.

On April 9, 2022, the province announced a $107-million contract to twin and realign 13.2 kilometres (8.2 mi) of Highway 11/17 from the end of the existing four lane route near Highway 587 to Pearl. Construction is scheduled to begin in late 2022 and be completed in 2026.

The remaining 34 kilometres (21 mi) are in the detailed design process as of 2022, and are broken up into several sections: 6.6 kilometres (4.1 mi) between Pearl and south of Ouimet; 10.3 kilometres (6.4 mi) between Dorion Loop Road and near Highway 582; 8.3 kilometres (5.2 mi) between Highway 582 and Coughlin Road; 4.7 kilometres (2.9 mi) between Coughlin Road and Red Rock Road No. 9, crossing the Black Sturgeon River and connecting with the existing four lane route, and; 4.2 kilometres (2.6 mi) through Nipigon, between Stillwater Creek and First Street.

Highway 11 between Barrie and Gravenhurst is currently a right-in/right-out (RIRO) expressway (local access permitted, turnarounds via special interchanges), except for a section around Orillia which is a full freeway. Another freeway section (formerly Highway 400A) does exist in Barrie with the freeway segment from the southern terminus ending at Penetanguishene Road (Simcoe County Road 93). The MTO is currently planning on either converting the existing RIRO expressway to a full six-lane freeway or bypassing it with an entirely new alignment. An environmental and fiscal study concluded that the improvements from Barrie to Gravenhurst will involve the existing route being widened with the exception of a portion south of Gravenhurst that may potentially be constructed to the east of the current road.

There are also plans to convert sections of Highway 11 north of North Bay to a 2+1 highway as a pilot project. The project will feature a centre passing lane that will alternate direction approximately every two to five kilometres. One section will span for 14 kilometres (8.7 mi) from Sand Dam Road to Ellesmere Road, and the other will span for 16 kilometres (9.9 mi) from Highway 64 to Jumping Caribou Lake Road. The section from Sand Dam Road to Ellesmere Road will be prioritized. A contract was awarded by the provincial government to AECOM Canada to begin the environmental assessment and design work in 2023. The Ministry of Transportation has stated that they would consider additional potential locations for a 2+1 highway after the pilot is completed and evaluated.

In the 2025 Ontario general election, the government of Doug Ford made a campaign pledge to extend the 2+1 construction all the way to Cochrane, although no firm timeframe for this construction has yet been announced. In July 2025, the Federation of Northern Ontario Municipalities sent a proposal to the provincial and federal governments calling for the 2+1 upgrades to be made.

== Major intersections ==
The following table lists the major junctions along Highway 11, as noted by the Ministry of Transportation of Ontario. Interchanges are numbered between Barrie and North Bay.

Division	Location	km	mi	Exit	Destinations	Notes
Metropolitan Toronto	Toronto (Old)	−100.5	−62.4		Highway 2 (Gardiner Expressway) / Lake Shore Boulevard	Highway 2 was downloaded in 1997; Yonge Street begins at Queens Quay just to the south
Metropolitan Toronto	Toronto (Old)	−98.9	−61.5		King Street	
Metropolitan Toronto	Toronto (Old)	−98.0	−60.9		Dundas Street	
Metropolitan Toronto	Toronto (Old)	−96.4	−59.9		Highway 5 (Bloor Street)	Highway 5 was downloaded in 1997
Metropolitan Toronto	Toronto (Old)	−92.2	−57.3		Eglinton Avenue	
Metropolitan Toronto	North York	−87.0	−54.1		Highway 401	
Metropolitan Toronto	North York	−86.0	−53.4		Sheppard Avenue	
Metropolitan Toronto-York boundary	North York-Vaughan-Markham tripoint	−81.9	−50.9		Steeles Avenue	Former Highway 11 is presently Regional Road 1 through York Region
York	Vaughan–Markham–Richmond Hill tripoint	−77.8	−48.3		407 ETR	Highway 407 exit 77
York	Richmond Hill	−77.3	−48.0		Highway 7 – Vaughan, Markham	Highway 7 was downloaded in 1997; presently Regional Road 7
York	Richmond Hill	−73.7	−45.8		Regional Road 25 (Major Mackenzie Drive)	
York	Aurora	−59.2	−36.8		Regional Road 15 (Wellington Street)	
York	Newmarket	−53.0	−32.9		Highway 9 west – Orangeville / Davis Drive east	Highway 9 was downloaded in 1997; presently Regional Road 31 (Davis Drive West)
York	East Gwillimbury	−49.9	−31.0		Regional Road 51 (Yonge Street) – Holland Landing	Regional Road 1 (former Highway 11) departs the Yonge Street alignment
York	East Gwillimbury	−46.2	−28.7		Regional Road 38 (Bathurst Street)	
York–Simcoe boundary	King–Bradford West Gwillimbury boundary	−43.3	−26.9	West Holland River bridge		
York–Simcoe boundary	King–Bradford West Gwillimbury boundary	−43.3	−26.9		York Regional Road 1 ends	Former Highway 11 follows Bridge Street and Holland Street
Simcoe	Bradford West Gwillimbury	−42.3	−26.3		Holland Street / Barrie Street	Bradford; formerly Highway 88 west; to County Road 88 west; former Highway 11 follows Barrie Street
Simcoe	Bradford West Gwillimbury	−40.9	−25.4		Line 8 County Road 4 begins	Simcoe County Road 4 southern terminus; Yonge Street rejoins former Highway 11
Simcoe	Innisfil	−30.9	−19.2		County Road 89 west – Alliston; County Road 3 east (Shore Acres Drive)	Formerly Highway 89 west
Simcoe	Innisfil	−21.2	−13.2		County Road 21 (Innisfil Beach Road)	
Simcoe–Barrie boundary	Innisfil–Barrie boundary	−17.1	−10.6		Lockhart Road Simcoe County Road 4 ends	Simcoe County Road 4 northern terminus; Yonge Street continues north
Barrie		−9.7	−6.0		Essa Road	Formerly Highway 27 south; former southern end of Highway 27 concurrency
Barrie		−7.8	−4.8		Dunlop Street	Formerly Highway 90 west
Barrie		−7.5	−4.7		Bayfield Street	Formerly Highway 26 west / Highway 27 north; former northern end of Highway 27 concurrency
Barrie		0.0	0.0		Highway 400 south – Barrie, Toronto	Northbound exit and southbound entrance; Highway 11 southern terminus; Highway 11 formerly followed Penetanguishene Road southwards prior to downloading; southern end of former unsigned Highway 400A; Highway 400 exit 106
Simcoe–Barrie boundary	Barrie–Oro-Medonte boundary	1.1	0.68		County Road 93 north (Penetanguishene Road) – Midland	Formerly Highway 93 north / Highway 11 south; northern end of former unsigned Highway 400A; continuation of Highway 400 kilometre markers
Simcoe	Oro-Medonte	5.4	3.4	—	Oro-Medonte Line 3	
Simcoe	Oro-Medonte	8.3	5.2	—	Oro-Medonte Line 5	
Simcoe	Oro-Medonte	11.1	6.9	—	Oro-Medonte Line 7	
Simcoe	Oro-Medonte	13.0	8.1	—	Oro-Medonte Line 9	
Simcoe	Oro-Medonte	15.8	9.8	—	County Road 20 west (Oro-Medonte Line 11)	
Simcoe	Oro-Medonte	21.9	13.6	—	Oro-Medonte Line 14 / Sideroad 15	
Simcoe	Oro-Medonte	23.7	14.7	—	Oro-Medonte Line 15	Southbound access to County Road 49
Simcoe–Orillia boundary	Oro-Medonte–Orillia boundary	24.7	15.3	129	County Road 49 east (Memorial Avenue)	Northbound exit only; southbound exit and northbound entrance via Oro-Medonte Line 15
Orillia		25.3	15.7	131	Highway 12 south / TCH – Whitby; Old Barrie Road	Southern end of Highway 12 concurrency
Orillia		27.7	17.2	133	Highway 12 north / TCH – Coldwater, Midland; Coldwater Road	Northern end of Highway 12 concurrency; northbound signed as exits 131A (east) and 131B (west)
Orillia–Simcoe boundary	Orillia–Severn boundary	29.8	18.5	135	Burnside Line / West Street	Formerly County Road 18
Orillia–Simcoe boundary	Orillia–Severn boundary	31.4	19.5	—	Laclie Street	Northbound entrance and southbound exit
Simcoe	Severn	35.3	21.9	—	Telford Line / Soules Road	Happyland
Simcoe	Severn	38.9	24.2	—	New Brailey Line / Bayou Road	Cumberland Beach
Simcoe	Severn	41.9	26.0	—	South Sparrow Lake Road / Goldstein Line	Hawkins Corner; formerly County Road 38 north
Simcoe	Severn	44.7	27.8	—	Angnew Road / Shoreview Drive	
Simcoe	Severn	46.7	29.0	—	County Road 169 south	Washago; formerly Highway 169 south; former southern end of Highway 169 concurrency
Simcoe	Severn	48.4	30.1	—	County Road 52 east (Coopers Falls Road), Canal Road, Bradley Drive	Severn Bridge
Simcoe–Muskoka boundary	Severn–Gravenhurst boundary	49.0	30.4	Severn River bridge		
Muskoka	Gravenhurst	49.4	30.7	—	District Road 13 north (Southwood Road)	
Muskoka	Gravenhurst	53.0	32.9	—	Sparrow Lake Route 'D'	
Muskoka	Gravenhurst	56.7	35.2	—	South Kahshe Lake Road / Kilworthy Road	
Muskoka	Gravenhurst	59.2	36.8	—	District Road 19 west (Beier's Road)	Southbound right-in/right-out
Muskoka	Gravenhurst	61.1	38.0	—	Sedore Road	Northbound access to District Road 19
Muskoka	Gravenhurst	64.9	40.3	169	District Road 169 west (Bethune Drive)	Dead Man's Curve; no northbound entrance; formerly Highway 169 north; former northern end of Highway 169 concurrency
Muskoka	Gravenhurst	69.9	43.4	176	District Road 41 west (Bethune Drive); District Road 6 east (Doe Lake Road)	
Muskoka	Gravenhurst–Bracebridge boundary	76.8	47.7	182	Highway 118 east – Vankoughnet, Haliburton; District Road 118 west – Bracebridge	Formerly Highway 118 west; access to Muskoka Airport
Muskoka	Bracebridge	78.8	49.0	184	District Road 37 north (Cedar Lane); Fredrick Street	
Muskoka	Bracebridge	83.6	51.9	189	District Road 42 west (Taylor Road)	
Muskoka	Bracebridge	87.5	54.4	193	District Road 117 east – Baysville; Cedar Lane	Formerly Highway 117 east
Muskoka	Bracebridge	88.0	54.7		District Road 50 west (High Falls Road)	
Muskoka	Huntsville	99.9	62.1		District Road 44 east (South Mary Lake Road)	Northbound right-in/right-out
Muskoka	Huntsville	101.8	63.3	207	Highway 141 west – Parry Sound, Utterson; District Road 10 east (Port Sydney Road) – Port Sydney	
Muskoka	Huntsville	114.3	71.0	219	District Road 3 (Aspdin Road / Main Street) – Huntsville, Aspdin	
Muskoka	Huntsville	116.6	72.5	221	District Road 2 (West Road / Ravenscliffe Road) – Huntsville, Ravenscliffe	
Muskoka	Huntsville	118.3	73.5	223	Highway 60 east – Ottawa, Algonquin Provincial Park	
Muskoka	Huntsville	121.5	75.5	226	District Road 3 south (Old North Road)	
Muskoka–Parry Sound boundary	Huntsville–Perry boundary	130.3	81.0	235	Highway 592 north (Novar Road)	Novar
Parry Sound	Perry	139.2	86.5	244	Fern Glen Road / Scotia Road	Emsdale
Parry Sound	Perry	143.4	89.1	248	Highway 518 – Sprucedale, Kearney	Emsdale
Parry Sound	Armour	147.2	91.5	252	Doe Lake Road / Three Mile Lake Road	Katrine
Parry Sound	Armour	152.6	94.8	257	Highway 520 west (Ferguson Road) – Burk's Falls, Magnetawan	
Parry Sound	Burk's Falls	156.2	97.1	261	Ontario Street / Pickerel & Jack Lake Road–Magnetawan	
Parry Sound	Armour–Strong boundary	160.9	100.0	266	Sterling Creek Road / Pevensey Road	
Parry Sound	Strong	165.1	102.6	270	Black Creek Road / Robins Road	
Parry Sound	Strong	171.6	106.6	276	Highway 124 – Sundridge, South River, Parry Sound	
Parry Sound	Strong–Machar boundary	178.7	111.0	282	Boundary Road / Mountainview Road – South River, Sundridge	
Parry Sound	Machar	184.2	114.5	289	Highway 124 – Sudnridge, South River	
Parry Sound	Unorganized North East Parry Sound	189.2	117.6	294	Goreville Road, Summit Road (Highway 124 south)	Laurier; Highway 124 northern terminus (unsigned)
Parry Sound	Powassan	196.6	122.2	301	Highway 522 west – Port Loring	Trout Creek
Parry Sound	Powassan	201.4	125.1	306	Highway 522B south (Hemlock Road) – Port Loring	Trout Creek
Parry Sound	Powassan	211.9	131.7	316	Highway 534 west (Clark Street) – Powassan, Restoule	
Parry Sound	Callander	224.9	139.7	329	Highway 654 (Lake Nosbonsing Road) – Callander, Astorville	To Highway 94 north
Nipissing	North Bay	234.0	145.4	338	Lakeshore Drive	Formerly Highway 11B north
Nipissing	North Bay	239.7	148.9	344	Highway 17 east / TCH – Ottawa	Southern end of Highway 17 North Bay concurrency; southern (eastern) end of Trans-Canada Highway designation
Nipissing	North Bay	240.9	149.7		Fisher Street	Formerly Highway 17B west
Nipissing	North Bay	241.5	150.1		Highway 63 east (Trout Lake Road); Cassells Street west	
Nipissing	North Bay	243.8	151.5		Highway 17 west / TCH – Sudbury Algonquin Avenue	Northern end of Highway 17 North Bay concurrency; formerly Highway 11B south
Nipissing	North Bay	244.3	151.8		McKeown Avenue / Airport Road	Access to North Bay Airport
Nipissing	Temagami	300.9	187.0		Highway 64 west – Sturgeon Falls	Marten River, Ontario
Timiskaming	Coleman	380.4	236.4		Highway 11B north – Cobalt	
Timiskaming	Temiskaming Shores	389.9	242.3		Highway 558 (Municipal Road) – Haileybury	
Timiskaming	Temiskaming Shores	396.6	246.4		Highway 65 east (Whitewood Avenue) – New Liskeard	Southern end of Highway 65 concurrency
Timiskaming	Temiskaming Shores	399.3	248.1		Highway 65 west – Matachewan	Northern end of Highway 65 concurrency; formerly Highway 11B south
Timiskaming	Harley	411.1	255.4		Highway 569 (Hilliardtown Road) – Couttsville	
Timiskaming	Harley–Hilliard boundary	417.1	259.2		Highway 562 west – Thornloe	
Timiskaming	Armstrong	426.0	264.7		Highway 571 south	Earlton
Timiskaming	Evanturel	434.7	270.1		Highway 569 east / Highway 624 north	Heaslip
Timiskaming	Englehart	440.9	274.0		Highway 560 – Charlton	
Timiskaming	Unorganized West Timiskaming	459.0	285.2		Highway 573 south – Charlton	
Timiskaming	Unorganized West Timiskaming	459.6	285.6		Highway 112 north – Kirkland Lake	
Timiskaming	Unorganized West Timiskaming	478.6	297.4		Highway 66 / TCH – Matachewan, Kirkland Lake	Highway 66 is part of the Trans-Canada Highway east of Highway 11
Timiskaming	Kenogami Lake	479.6	298.0		Highway 568 east	
Timiskaming	Unorganized West Timiskaming	493.5	306.6		Highway 570 east – Sesekinika	
Cochrane	Black River-Matheson	521.1	323.8		Highway 572 north – Holtyre	Ramore
Cochrane	Black River-Matheson	535.6	332.8		Highway 101 east (Fourth Avenue) – Quebec border	Matheson; southern end of Highway 101 concurrency
Cochrane	Black River-Matheson	542.0	336.8		Highway 101 west – Timmins	Northern end of Highway 101 concurrency
Cochrane	Black River-Matheson–Iroquois Falls boundary	556.3	345.7		Highway 577 south (Shillington Road) – Shillington	
Cochrane	Iroquois Falls	556.6	345.9		Monteith Road	Monteith; formerly Highway 577 north
Cochrane	Iroquois Falls	569.0	353.6		Highway 67 north – Iroquois Falls	Porquis Junction
Cochrane	Iroquois Falls	575.9	357.8		Jacob's Hill Road	Nellie Lake; formerly Highway 578 east
Cochrane	Cochrane	615.5	382.5		Highway 579 north / Highway 652 east (Third Avenue)	Directional signage changes from north-south to east-west
Cochrane	Unorganized Cochrane	625.0	388.4		Highway 636 north – Frederick	
Cochrane	Unorganized Cochrane	633.5	393.6		Highway 668 north – Hunta	
Cochrane	Driftwood	644.1	400.2		Highway 655 south – Timmins	
Cochrane	Smooth Rock Falls	670.1	416.4		Highway 634 north – Fraserdale, Abitibi Canyon	
Cochrane	Moonbeam	712.6	442.8		Highway 581 north	
Cochrane	Kapuskasing	727.3– 738.2	451.9– 458.7		Kapuskasing Connecting Link	
Cochrane	Hearst	829.4	515.4		Highway 583 north	
Cochrane	Hearst	830.0	515.7		6th Street	Beginning of Hearst Connecting Link
Cochrane	Hearst	830.6	516.1		Highway 583 south (9th Street) – Mead	
Cochrane	Hearst	831.8	516.9		15th Street	End of Hearst Connecting Link
Cochrane	Unorganized Cochrane	865.0	537.5		Highway 663 north – Calstock	
Cochrane	Unorganized Cochrane	893.8	555.4		Highway 631 south – White River	
Thunder Bay	Greenstone	1,025.9	637.5		Highway 625 south – Caramat	
Thunder Bay	Greenstone	1,041.9	647.4		Foresty Road	Longlac
Thunder Bay	Greenstone	1,042.4	647.7	Long Lake (Kenogami River) bridge		
Thunder Bay	Greenstone	1,074.9	667.9		Highway 584 north – Geraldton, Nakina	
Thunder Bay	Greenstone	1,130.5	702.5		Auden Road (Road 801)–Auden	Formerly Highway 801 north
Thunder Bay	Greenstone	1,153.1	716.5		Highway 580 west (Leitch Road)	Beardmore
Thunder Bay	Nipigon	1,232.3	765.7		Highway 17 east / TCH – Sault Ste. Marie	Eastern end of Highway 17 Thunder Bay concurrency
Thunder Bay	Nipigon	1,232.8	766.0	Nipigon River Bridge over the Nipigon River		
Thunder Bay	Nipigon	1,236.3	768.2		Highway 585 north (Cameron Falls Road) – Cameron Falls, Pine Portage	
Thunder Bay	Red Rock	1,244.7	773.4		Highway 628 east – Red Rock	
Thunder Bay	Unorganized Thunder Bay	1,260.2	783.1		Highway 582 south (Hurkett Road) – Hurkett	
Thunder Bay	Unorganized Thunder Bay	1,264.5	785.7		Highway 582 east (Hurkett Road) – Hurkett	
Thunder Bay	Shuniah	1,300.8	808.3		Highway 587 south (Pass Lake Road) – Pass Lake	
Thunder Bay	Shuniah	1,330.8	826.9		Highway 527 north – Armstrong	
Thunder Bay	Thunder Bay	1,334.6	829.3	—	Hodder Avenue	Interchange; formerly Highway 11B west / Highway 17B; eastern end of Thunder Bay Expressway
Thunder Bay	Thunder Bay	1,341.0	833.3		Highway 102 west (Dawson Road) – Kaministiquia	Highway 102 eastern terminus
Thunder Bay	Thunder Bay	1,347.0	837.0		Harbour Expressway east Highway 61 south (Thunder Bay Expressway) – Duluth	Highway 11 / Highway 17 leave Thunder Bay Expressway; eastern terminus of MOM's Way
Thunder Bay	Oliver Paipoonge	1,359.2	844.6		Highway 130 (Arthur Street West) – Rosslyn	Former Highway 11 / Highway 17 alignment
Thunder Bay	Oliver Paipoonge	1,368.6	850.4		Highway 588 south – Stanley	
Thunder Bay	Oliver Paipoonge	1,374.9	854.3		Highway 590 south	Kakabeka Falls
Thunder Bay	Sunshine	1,390.1	863.8		Highway 102 east (Dawson Road)	Highway 102 western terminus
Thunder Bay	Shabaqua Corners	1,411.1	876.8		Highway 17 west / TCH – Dryden, Kenora	Western end of Highway 17 Thunder Bay concurrency
Thunder Bay	Unorganized Thunder Bay	1,431.9	889.7		Highway 586 south (Shelter Bay Road)	
Thunder Bay	Unorganized Thunder Bay	1,455.3	904.3		Highway 802 north (Kashabowie Road) – Kashabowie	
Thunder Bay	Unorganized Thunder Bay	1,457.1	905.4		Highway 802 south	
Rainy River	Unorganized Rainy River	1,517.9	943.2		Highway 633 – Quetico Centre	
Rainy River	Unorganized Rainy River	1,524.9	947.5		Highway 623 north (Sapawe Road) – Shapawe	
Rainy River	Atikokan	1,546.4	960.9		Highway 11B north – Atikokan	To Highway 622
Rainy River	Unorganized Rainy River	1,662.1	1,032.8		Highway 502 north (Manitou Road)	
Rainy River	Unorganized Rainy River	1,676.6– 1,682.3	1,041.8– 1,045.3	Noden Causeway over Rainy Lake		
Rainy River	Fort Frances	1,688.3	1,049.1		Beginning of Fort Frances Connecting Link	
Rainy River	Fort Frances	1,690.9	1,050.7		Highway 71 south–International Falls	Eastern end of Highway 71 concurrency; to US 53 / US 71
Rainy River	Fort Frances	1,692.9	1,051.9		Highway 602 south (Sunset Drive)	
Rainy River	Fort Frances	1,696.9	1,054.4		End of Fort Frances Connecting Link	
Rainy River	Alberton	1,702.1	1,057.6		Highway 611 south	Eastern end of Highway 611 concurrency
Rainy River	Alberton	1,704.1	1,058.9		Highway 611 north	Western end of Highway 611 concurrency
Rainy River	La Vallee	1,713.9	1,065.0		Highway 613	Devlin
Rainy River	Emo	1,726.6	1,072.9		Highway 602 east	
Rainy River	Manitou Rapids 11	1,732.8	1,076.7		Highway 71 north / TCH – Kenora	Western end of Highway 71 concurrency; western end of Trans-Canada Highway (continues on Highway 71 north)
Rainy River	Morley	1,751.7	1,088.5		Highway 617 north	Stratton
Rainy River	Dawson	1,763.5	1,095.8		Highway 619 north	Pinewood
Rainy River	Dawson	1,773.1	1,101.8		Highway 621 north – Gameland	Sleeman
Rainy River	Rainy River	1,782.0	1,107.3		Beginning of Rainy River Connecting Link	
Rainy River	Rainy River	1,784.6	1,108.9		Highway 600 north (B Street)	End of Rainy River Connecting Link
Canada–United States border (Baudette–Rainy River Border Crossing)		1,784.9	1,109.1	Baudette–Rainy River International Bridge across Rainy River (tolled)		
Canada–United States border (Baudette–Rainy River Border Crossing)		1,784.9	1,109.1		MN 72 south (MOM's Way) to MN 11 – Baudette	Continuation into Minnesota
1.000 mi = 1.609 km; 1.000 km = 0.621 mi: Closed/former; Concurrency terminus; Incomplete access; Tolled; Route transition

== Images ==
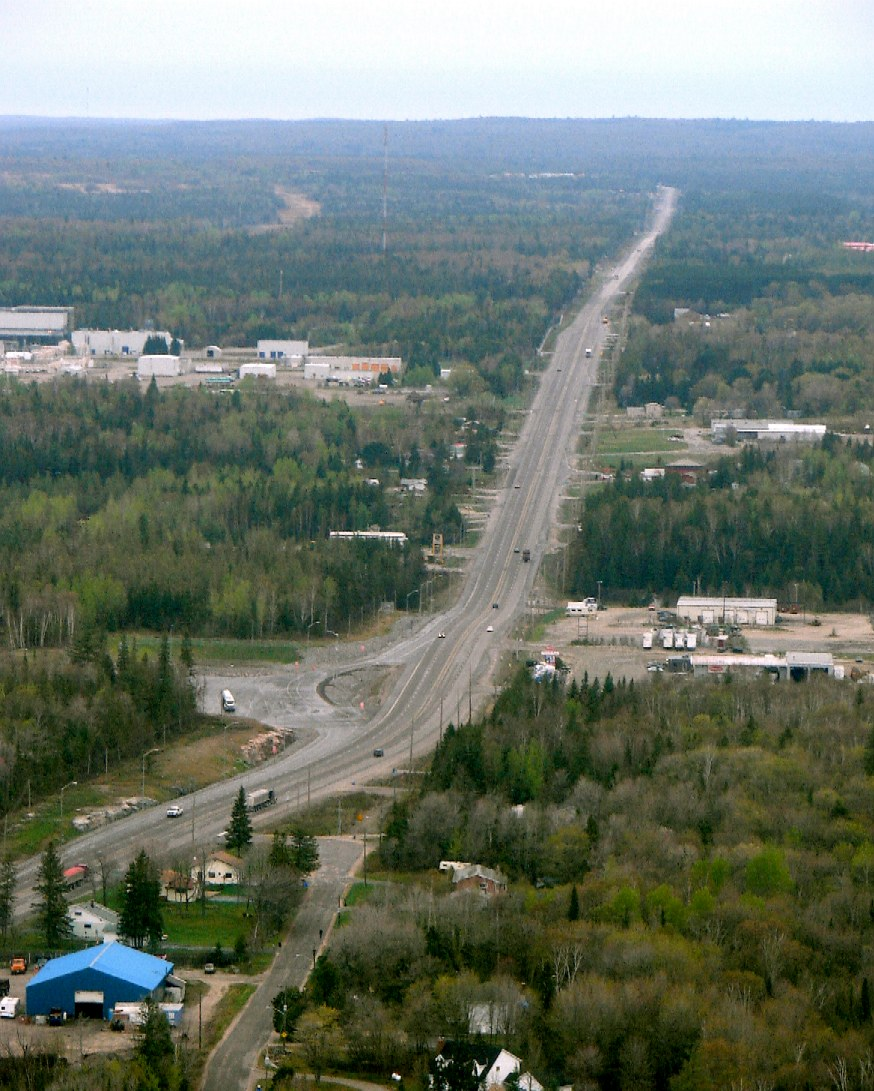
Highway 11 just north of North Bay. On the left the Brake Check area can be seen before trucks head into North Bay.

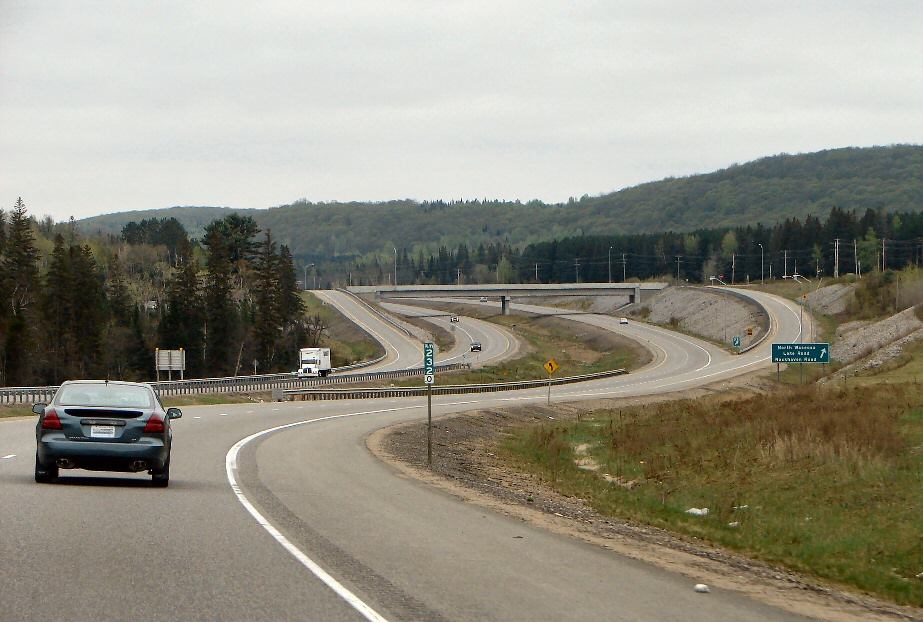
As a 4-lane divided highway at North Waseosa Lake Road/Rockhaven Road interchange near Melissa.

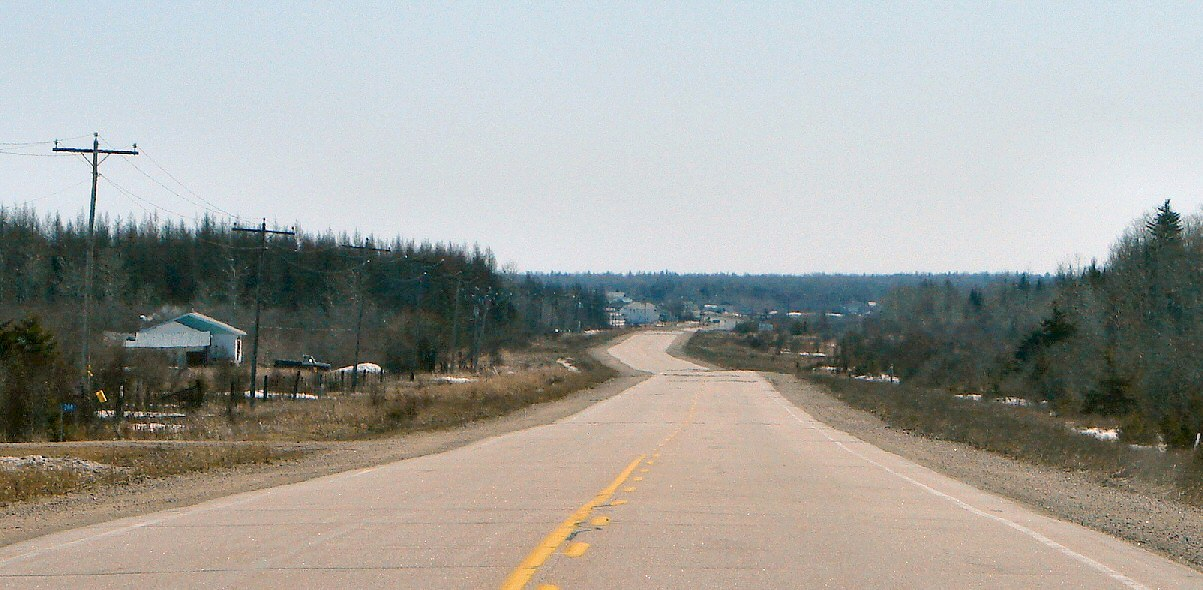
Between Cochrane and Longlac, Highway 11 is straight and flat with little development.

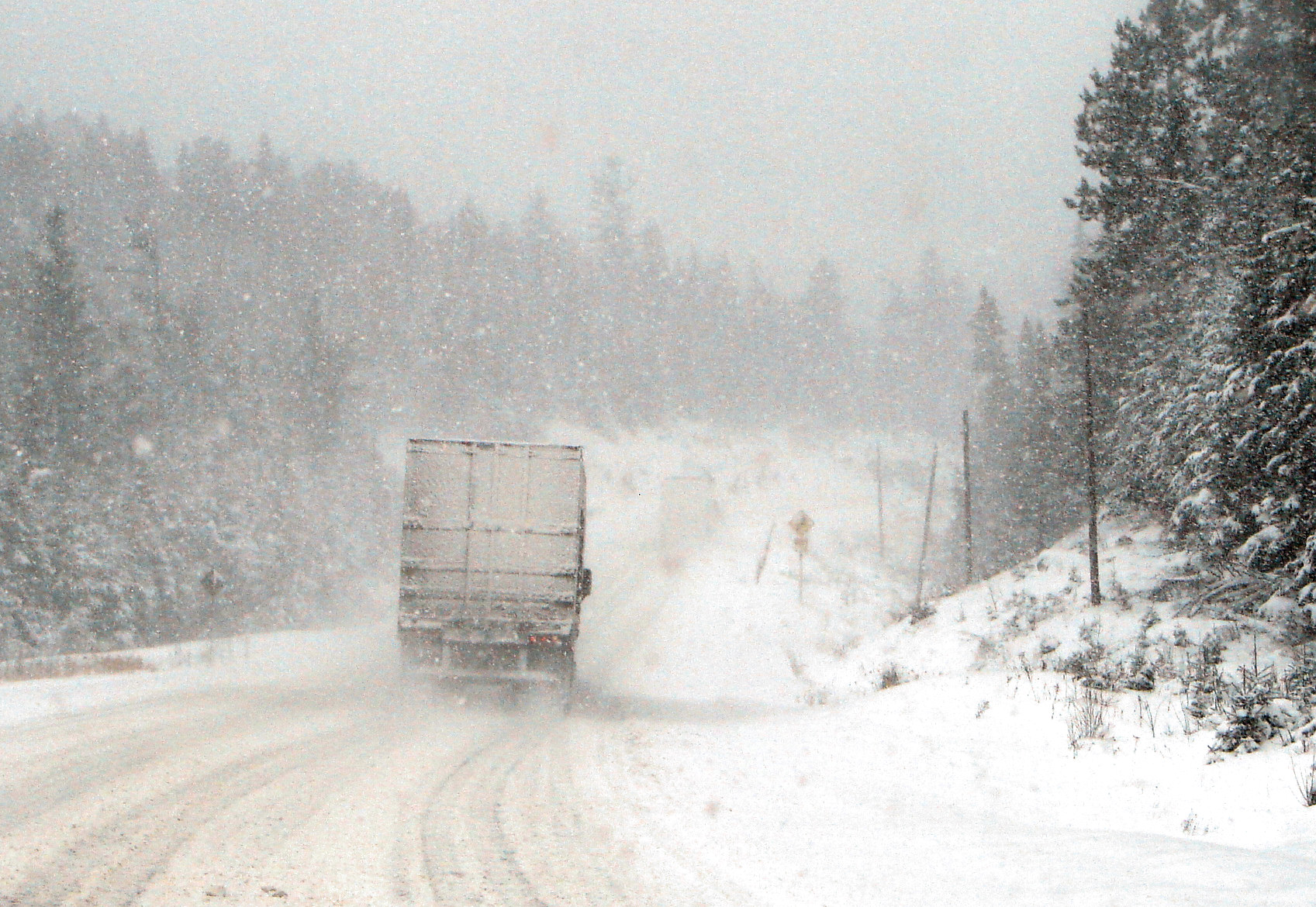
Winter can pose serious driving hazards along Hwy 11 (near Temagami).

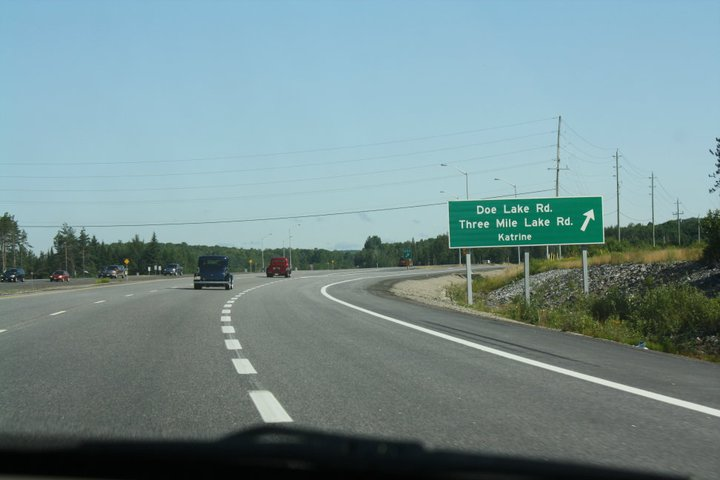
New 4-lane divided Hwy 11 (near Katrine).

== See also ==
- Webers, a fast-food restaurant located alongside the highway, near Orillia

== Notes ==
Trans-Canada Highway
Previous routes Highway 17 Highway 71	Highway 11	Next routes Highway 66 Highway 17
