= Ontario Highway 11B =

Former Ontario provincial highway

Highway 11B

Route information
- Auxiliary route of Highway 11
- Maintained by Ministry of Transportation of Ontario

Location
- Country: Canada
- Province: Ontario

Highway system
- Ontario provincial highways; Current; Former; 400-series
← Highway 11	→ Highway 12
Former provincial highways
← Highway 11A

Highway 11B is the designation for ten business routes of Highway 11 in the Canadian province of Ontario. All but one was the original route of Highway 11 through the town or city that it served, and was subsequently given the 11B designation when a newer bypass route was constructed to reduce traffic pressure on the urban street network. Seven of the nine sections of Highway 11B have now been decommissioned by the Ministry of Transportation, with the exception of the Atikokan route and the southernmost section of the former Tri-Town route between Cobalt and Highway 11.

== Holland Landing ==
Highway 11B
- Location: Holland Landing
- Length: 4.3 km (2.7 mi)
- Existed: 1958–1981

Highway 11B through Holland Landing was created in 1958 when Highway 11 realigned to a new bypass, with Highway 11B assuming the former alignment along Yonge Street through Holland Landing. The province transferred Highway 11B to the Regional Municipality of York in 1981 and the route is now known as York Regional Road 83.

== Orillia ==
Highway 11B
- Location: Orillia
- Length: 8.7 km (5.4 mi)
- Existed: 1959–1981

Highway 11B in Orillia was created in 1959 when Highway 11 was realigned to the Orillia bypass, which had opened in 1954. Highway 11B followed Memorial Avenue, Colborne Street, West Street, Coldwater Road, Front Street, Neywash Street, and Laclie Street through downtown Orillia. Over the years, as Orillia expanded its city limits, sections of Highway 11B were transferred from provincial to city jurisdiction. In 1981, the route was redesignated as unsigned Highway 7183, which remained until 1998 when jurisdiction was transferred to the City of Orillia, with exception of a small southern section in Simcoe County which became Simcoe County Road 49.

== Gravenhurst ==
Highway 11B
- Location: Gravenhurst
- Length: 6.6 km (4.1 mi)
- Existed: 1948–1972

Highway 11B in Gravenhurst was created in 1948 when Highway 11 was realigned to the first Gravenhurst bypass (Bethune Drive), and followed Muskoka Road and Winewood Avenue through downtown Gravenhurst. In 1970, Highway 11 was moved to the second Gravenhurst bypass and Highway 11B was moved to Bethune Drive. Highway 11B was decommissioned in 1972, with the section south of Bay Street becoming part of Highway 169 (present-day Muskoka District Road 169) and Muskoka District Road 41.

== Huntsville ==
Highway 11B
- Location: Huntsville
- Length: 11.4 km (7.1 mi)
- Existed: 1959–1972

Highway 11B in Huntsville was created in 1959 when Highway 11 was realigned to the Huntsville bypass. Highway 11B followed Main Street through downtown Huntsville until 1972 when it was decommissioned and became Muskoka District Road 3.

== Powassan ==
Highway 11B
- Location: Powassan
- Length: 4.4 km (2.7 mi)
- Existed: 1956–1962

Highway 11B in Powassan was created in 1956 when Highway 11 was realigned to the Powassan bypass. Highway 11B followed Main Street through downtown Huntsville it was decommissioned in 1962.

== North Bay ==
Highway 11B
- Location: North Bay
- Length: 11.9 km (7.4 mi)
- Existed: 1958–1998

Highway 11B in North Bay was created in 1958, when the former route of Highway 11 through downtown North Bay was given a new route number. Following the completion of the North Bay Bypass in 1953, both the old route through downtown and North Bay Bypasses were posted as Highway 11, leading to some confusion amongst motorists. Highway 11B followed Lakeshore Drive, Main Street, and Algonquin Avenue, with it sharing a concurrency with Highway 17B between Fisher Street and Algonquin Avenue. In the mid 1970s, Highway 11B in downtown North Bay was rerouted to parallel one-way streets, with northbound traffic following McIntyre Street and southbound traffic following Oak Street. Highway 11B in North Bay was decommissioned in 1998.

== Cobalt–Temiskaming Shores ==
Highway 11B
- Location: Cobalt–Temiskaming Shores
- Length: 7.1 km (4.4 mi)
- Existed: 1963–present
- History: Pre-1998 length: 26.1 km (16.2 mi)

Highway 11B through Cobalt, Haileybury and New Liskeard was created in 1963 when Highway 11 was transferred to the newly opened Tri Town Bypass, and was the second longest business route in Ontario with a length of 26.1 kilometres (16.2 mi). Highway 11B followed Miller Avenue, Cobalt Street, Grandview Avenue, Silver Street and Lang Street through Cobalt; King Street, Rorke Avenue, Main Street, Ferguson Avenue and Lakeshore Road through North Cobalt and Haileybury; and Lakeshore Road, Paget Street, Whitewood Avenue and Armstrong Street through New Liskeard. During the 1997–1998 downloading, the majority of Highway 11B was transferred to local municipalities. The remaining sections of Highway 11B runs between Highway 11 in Coleman Township to Cobalt town limits, and between Cobalt and Temiskaming Shores city limits. The northernmost 800 metres (1/2 mi) was retained but renumbered as Highway 65 in 2003.

In 1987, a section of the Cobalt route of Highway 11B collapsed into an abandoned mine.

=== Major intersections ===
The following table lists the major junctions along Highway 11B. The entire route is located in Timiskaming District.

Location	km	mi	Destinations	Notes
Coleman	0.0	0.0	Highway 11 / TCH – North Bay	Highway 11B southern terminus
Cobalt	5.6– 7.9	3.5– 4.9	Highway 11B is discontinuous for 2.3 km (1.4 mi) through Cobalt; former Connecting Link	
Temiskaming Shores	9.4	5.8	Temiskaming Shores city limits	Highway 11B northern terminus
Temiskaming Shores	13.5	8.4	Highway 567 south (Lakeview Avenue) – Silver Centre	North Cobalt urban area
Temiskaming Shores	13.5	8.4	Highway 558 west (Main Street)	Haileybury urban area; to Highway 11
Temiskaming Shores	23.4	14.5	Whitewood Avenue to Highway 65 west – Elk Lake	New Liskeard urban area
Temiskaming Shores	25.3	15.7	Highway 65 east – Quebec	
Temiskaming Shores	26.1	16.2	Highway 11 / Highway 65 west / TCH – Cochrane	Former Highway 11B northern terminus; unsigned Highway 65 concurrency along Highway 11
1.000 mi = 1.609 km; 1.000 km = 0.621 mi: Closed/former

== Matheson–Porquis Junction ==
Highway 11B
- Location: Matheson–Porquis Junction
- Length: 32.7 km (20.3 mi)
- Existed: 1958–1961

Highway 11B between Matheson and Porquis Junction was created in 1958 when Highway 11 realigned. Highway 11B went from the Highway 11/Highway 101 junction in Matheson, through the communities of Monteith and Val Gagne, to the Highway 11/Highway 67 junction in Porquis Junction. At a length of 32.7 kilometres (20.3 mi), it was the longest business route in Ontario. Highway 11B was renumbered as Secondary Highway 626 in 1961, which in turn was transferred to the Municipal Township of Black River-Matheson and the Town of Iroquois Falls in 1974.

== Thunder Bay ==
Highway 11B
- Location: Thunder Bay
- Length: 17.5 km (10.9 mi)
- Existed: 1968–1997

Highway 11B between Port Arthur and Fort William (which later amalgamated to become Thunder Bay) was created in 1968 when the Highway 11/17 concurrency was realigned to follow the Thunder Bay Expressway, and was cosigned with Highway 17B for its entire length. Highway 11B/17B started at Hodder Avenue and travelled south to Cumberland Street, where it continued southwesterly along the shore of Thunder Bay. It continued on Water Street to Bay Street, where it turned west on Bay Street to Algoma Street, where it turned south-southwest and followed Algoma Street, Memorial Avenue, and May Street to Arthur Street. It travelled west on Arthur Street, past Kingsway (formerly Highway 61B), before rejoining Highway 11/17 as well as Highway 61.

== Atikokan ==
Highway 11B
- Location: Atikokan
- Length: 3.4 km (2.1 mi)
- Existed: 1965–present

Highway 11B in Atikokan was created in 1962 when Highway 11 was extended to Fort Frances; the extension was constructed south of Atikokan and bypassed the community, resulting in the bypassed section becoming Highway 11B. Highway 11B in Atikokan is unique in that is a spur route and does not form a loop that reconnects to Highway 11. Despite the larger number of business routes that were transferred to local municipalities in 1997–98, Highway 11B in Atikokan is one of the few that remained untouched and is still part of the provincial highway system.

=== Major intersections ===
The following table lists the major junctions along Highway 11B. The entire route is located in Rainy River District.

Location	km	mi	Destinations	Notes
	0.0	0.0	Highway 11 / TCH – Thunder Bay, Fort Frances	Highway 11B southern terminus
Atikokan	3.2	2.0	Highway 622 north	
Atikokan	3.4	2.1	Zuke Road	Highway 11B northern terminus
1.000 mi = 1.609 km; 1.000 km = 0.621 mi
