= Ontario Highway 518 =

Ontario provincial highway

Highway 518

Route information
- Maintained by Ministry of Transportation of Ontario
- Length: 72.7 km (45.2 mi)
- Existed: 1956–present

Major junctions
- West end: Highway 400 near Parry Sound
- East end: Kearney west limits

Location
- Country: Canada
- Province: Ontario
- Divisions: Parry Sound District
- Major cities: Orrville, Bear Lake, Sprucedale, Emsdale

Highway system
- Ontario provincial highways; Current; Former; 400-series
| ← Highway 516 | → Highway 519 |

Secondary Highway 518, commonly referred to as Highway 518, is a provincially maintained secondary highway in the Canadian province of Ontario. Highway 518 spans 72.7 kilometres (45.2 mi) between Parry Sound and Kearney. It serves as one of the many links between Highway 400 and Highway 11. The highway was assumed in 1956, and has remained generally unchanged since, aside from being truncated slightly at both ends.

== Route description ==
Highway 518 generally parallels the Seguin Trail, a recreational trail along the old rail bed of the Ottawa, Arnprior and Parry Sound Railway. It begins at Exit 220 of Highway 400, south of the town of Parry Sound, where the road continues west as Hunter Drive to the former route of Highway 69 (Oastler Park Drive). From Highway 400, the route travels straight east to Orrville, where it turns north onto Star Lake Road. The route zig-zags through rugged Canadian Shield and thick forests, generally arching northeast until meeting the Nipissing Colonization Road north of the ghost town of Seguin Falls. The highway crosses the Seguin Trail, turns east and parallels it through Bear Lake, Whitehall and Sprucedale. The trail arcs south at this point, and Highway 518 continues east. South of Doe Lake, the highway turns northeast, while Star Lake Road continues east.

The highway interchanges with Highway 11 at Exit 248, then immediately turns south and parallels Highway 11 until it meets Star Lake Road, which it turns east and follows through Emsdale. Within that town, it intersects Highway 592, the original route of Highway 11 before the freeway bypass opened. Highway 518 continues east through forests, ending at the entrance to Kearney. However, signage has not been removed east of this point.

== History ==
Highway 518 was first assumed by the Department of Highways in early 1956, along with several dozen other secondary highways, but was likely maintained as a development road prior to that; it was 76 kilometres (47 mi) long. The highway was extended east from Kearney to Sand Lake in 1963, increasing its length to 90 km (56 mi). Its route remained unchanged between then and January 1, 1998, when the easternmost 15.1 kilometres (9.4 mi) were decommissioned, returning the eastern terminus to the boundary into Kearney. The westernmost section of 518, between Highway 400 and Oastler Park Drive, has also since been decommissioned by the extension of Highway 400, and is now known as Hunter Drive.

== Major intersections ==
The following table lists the major junctions along Highway 518, as noted by the Ministry of Transportation of Ontario. The entire route is located in Parry Sound District.

| Location | km | mi | Destinations | Notes |
|---|---|---|---|---|
| Parry Sound | 0.0 | 0.0 | Highway 400 / TCH – Toronto, Parry Sound | Exit 220 |
| Parry Sound | | | Stisted Road – Hunstville | Stisted Road becomes Muskoka Regional Road 2 at the Parry Sound – Muskoka boundary |
| Perry | 62.4 | 38.8 | Highway 11 – Toronto, North Bay | Exit 248 |
| Emsdale | 65.2 | 40.5 | Highway 592 | Former route of Highway 11 |
| Kearney | 72.7 | 45.2 | | Kearney west limits |
1.000 mi = 1.609 km; 1.000 km = 0.621 mi
