= Ontario Highway 141 =

Ontario provincial highway

Highway 141
- Highway 141 highlighted in red

Route information
- Maintained by the Ministry of Transportation of Ontario
- Length: 54.3 km (33.7 mi)
- Existed: 1974–present

Major junctions
- West end: Highway 400 near Parry Sound
- East end: Highway 11 near Port Sydney

Location
- Country: Canada
- Province: Ontario

Highway system
- Ontario provincial highways; Current; Former; 400-series
← Highway 140	→ Highway 144

King's Highway 141, commonly referred to as Highway 141, is a provincially maintained highway in the Canadian province of Ontario. Its western terminus is at Highway 400 south of Horseshoe Lake in Seguin Township while its eastern terminus is at Highway 11 near Port Sydney. The route was designated in 1974 when Highway 532 was renumbered and upgraded from a secondary highway to a King's Highway. The route has remained generally unchanged since, though it was extended by several kilometres on October 7, 2003 when Highway 400 was extended north of Mactier.

== Route description ==
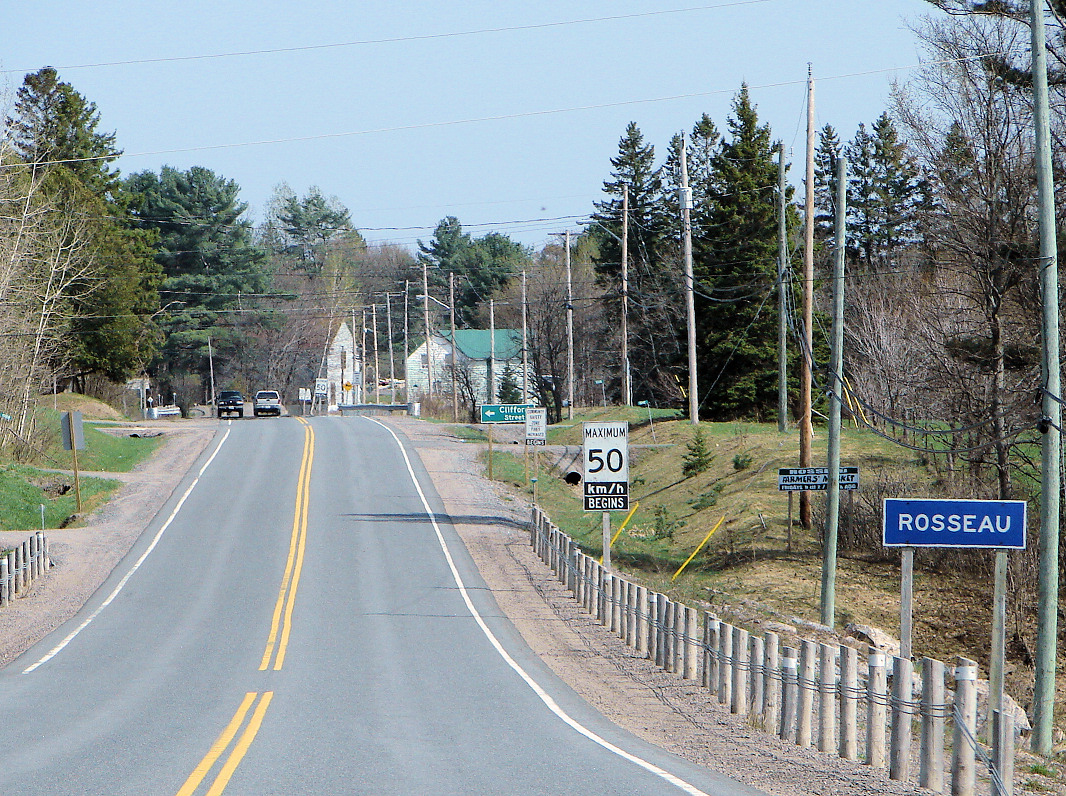
Highway 141 in Rosseau

Highway 141 is 54.3 km long. It travels through Muskoka District and Parry Sound District, travelling through the communities of Humphrey, Rosseau, Bent River (off-route but nearby), Ullswater, Raymond and Utterson. The road passes several bodies of water including Lake Rosseau, Skeleton Lake, Longs Lake and others. Other lakes are accessible via Highway 141 including Three Mile Lake, Lake Joseph, Horse Lake and others.

Highway 141 is the first major highway connection between Highway 400 and Highway 11 north of Barrie and the Muskoka Lakes Region. The highway terminates at Exit 207 on both of these highways, and is the only highway in Ontario to begin and end at the same exit number. On Highway 400, the Highway 141 junction is located near the Parry Sound Area Municipal Airport. Rosseau is the largest community located directly on the route.

== History ==
While Highway 141 was not designated until the mid-1970s, the route it follows was assumed in early 1956 by the Department of Highways. At that time, the route existed as Highway 532 and Highway 516. These two routes met southeast of Raymond, at what is now the junction with Muskoka District Road 35. On January 1, 1973, the route of Highway 532 was modified so that it continued east along the former Highway 516 instead of curving south through Bracebridge. This routing was short-lived; in 1974 the Ministry of Transportation and Communications redesignated the entirety of Highway 532 as Highway 141.

On October 7, 2003, with the extension of Highway 400 between Mactier and Horseshoe Lake, the western terminus of Highway 141 was shifted from Highway 69 at Hayes Corners southwest to Highway 400, adding three kilometres of shared routing with Highway 69 and the access road to the Parry Sound Airport. In the summer of 2012, Highway 69 was decommissioned in the area; the old route is now known as Rankin Lake Road north of the shared segment and Lake Joseph Road south of it.

== Major intersections ==
The following table lists the major junctions along Highway 141, as noted by the Ministry of Transportation of Ontario.

Division	Location	km	mi	Destinations	Notes
Parry Sound	Seguin	0.0	0.0	Highway 400 / TCH – Toronto, Sudbury, Parry Sound	Highway 400 exit 207
Parry Sound	Seguin	0.9	0.56	Lake Joseph Road (Highway 7289 south)	Formerly Highway 69 south; former southern end of Highway 69 concurrency (2003-2012)
Parry Sound	Seguin	4.4	2.7	Lake Joseph Road (Highway 7290 north)	Hayes Corners; formerly Highway 69 north; former northern end of Highway 69 concurrency (2003-2012); former Highway 141 western terminus (pre-2003)
Parry Sound	Seguin	21.7	13.5	Highway 632 south (Pine Street)	Rosseau
Muskoka	Muskoka Lakes	36.5	22.7	District Road 24 south (Dee Bank Road) – Dee Bank	Ullswater
Muskoka	Muskoka Lakes–Huntsville boundary	46.6	29.0	District Road 35 south (Raymond Road)	Parry Sound Colonization Road
Muskoka	Huntsville	53.0	32.9	Old Muskoka Road	
Muskoka	Huntsville	54.3	33.7	Highway 11 – Barrie, North Bay, Huntsville, Bracebridge District Road 10 east	Highway 11 exit 207; continues as District Road 10
1.000 mi = 1.609 km; 1.000 km = 0.621 mi
