= Ontario Highway 117 =

Former Ontario provincial highway

Highway 117
- A map of Highway 117, in red (as of December 31, 1997)

Route information
- Maintained by the Ministry of Transportation of Ontario
- Length: 43.0 km (26.7 mi)
- History: 1961–1970 (Vaughan); 1974–January 1, 1998 (Muskoka)

Major junctions
- West end: Highway 11 near Bracebridge
- East end: Highway 35 in Dorset

Location
- Country: Canada
- Province: Ontario

Highway system
- Ontario provincial highways; Current; Former; 400-series
| ← Highway 115 | → Highway 118 |
Former provincial highways
| ← Highway 116 |

King's Highway 117, commonly referred to as Highway 117, was a provincially maintained highway in the Canadian province of Ontario. The route travelled across Muskoka between Highway 11 north of Bracebridge and Highway 35 at Dorset, with Baysville being the only significant community between the two. It was created in 1974 by renumbering a portion of Highway 118, and existed until 1998, when it was transferred to the District Municipality of Muskoka. Today the former highway is known as Muskoka District Road 117.

== Route description ==
Highway 117 connected Highway 11 north of Bracebridge with Highway 35 in Dorset and is now known as Muskoka Road 117. More than half of the route travels along the southern shoreline of Lake of Bays. While a majority of the route is surrounded by rock and forest as it winds through the Canadian Shield, it passes through the communities of Baysville, Ninth Grove, Grandview, Browns Brae and Grove Park.

Beginning at Exit 193 along Highway 11, immediately north of Bracebridge, the former Highway 117 travels east through thick forests, with sparse residences lining the route. In Baysville, the route crosses the Muskoka River and curves northeast. It follows the southern shoreline of Lake of Bays for the remainder of its length, providing access to numerous cottages surrounding the lake. Highway 117 ended at Highway 35 just south of Dorset.

== History ==
Highway 117 (then Highway 118) west of Baysville in 1964

Highway 117 was originally a portion of Highway 118. The Department of Highways, predecessor to the modern Ministry of Transportation, assumed control of the road between Bracebridge and Dorset on November 16, 1955. The rest of the initial route of Highway 118 — between Highway 69 at Glen Orchard, and Bracebridge — was assumed one week later on November 23. This routing of Highway 118 remained in place until 1974, when the portion between Bracebridge and Dorset was redesignated as Highway 117, reducing the length of Highway 118 to 34.8 km (21.6 mi).

Throughout its existence, Highway 117 remained unchanged. However, budget constraints brought on by a recession in the 1990s resulted in the Mike Harris provincial government forming the Who Does What? committee to determine cost-cutting measures, in order to balance the budget after a deficit incurred by former premier Bob Rae. It was determined that many Ontario highways no longer served long-distance traffic movement and should therefore be maintained by local or regional levels of government. The MTO consequently transferred many highways to lower levels of government in 1997 and 1998, which resulted in the removal of a significant percentage of the provincial highway network. As the entirety of Highway 117 generally served local and seasonal traffic on the south side of Lake of Bays, and not long-distance movements, the route was transferred to the District Municipality of Muskoka. On January 1, 1998, Highway 117 was redesignated as Muskoka District Road 117.

== Major intersections ==
The following table lists the major junctions along Highway 117, as noted by the Ministry of Transportation of Ontario. The entire route was located in the District Municipality of Muskoka.

| Location | km | mi | Destinations | Notes |
|---|---|---|---|---|
| Bracebridge | 0.0 | 0.0 | Highway 11 – Barrie, Gravenhurst | |
| Lake of Bays | 16.5 | 10.3 | District Road 2 (Brunel Road) – Huntsville | |
| Lake of Bays | 27.3 | 17.0 | Browns Brae Road | |
| Dorset | 42.7 | 26.5 | District Road 39 (Main Street) | |
| Dorset | 43.0 | 26.7 | Highway 35 – Minden, Dwight | |
1.000 mi = 1.609 km; 1.000 km = 0.621 mi
