= Ontario Highway 519 =

Ontario provincial highway

Highway 519

Route information
- Maintained by the Ministry of Transportation of Ontario
- Length: 30.4 km (18.9 mi)

Major junctions
- West end: Highway 17 near Obatanga Provincial Park
- East end: Green Lake Road in Dubreuilville

Location
- Country: Canada
- Province: Ontario

Highway system
- Ontario provincial highways; Current; Former; 400-series
← Highway 518	→ Highway 520

Secondary Highway 519, commonly referred to as Highway 519, is a provincially maintained highway in the Canadian province of Ontario. The highway is 30.5 km (19.0 mi) in length, connecting Highway 17 near Obatanga Provincial Park with Dubreuilville. A private logging road continues east from that point.

Initially constructed in 1962 as the Dubreuilville Industrial Road, Highway 519 was assumed by the province in 1985-1986. The route is paved throughout its length and encounters no communities of any size along its length, aside from Dubreuilville. A previous iteration of Highway 519 existed in Haliburton County between 1956 and 1984, travelling from north of Kinmount to north of Haliburton Village.

== Route description ==
Highway 519 is a short paved highway in the northern section of Algoma District which provides access to the remote village of Dubreuilville. The route begins east of Obatanga Provincial Park at Highway 17, 40 km (25 mi) north of Wawa and 45 km (28 mi) south of White River. From there it travels 30.4 km (18.9 mi) eastward through a hilly and heavily forested region. The highway ends at Green Lake Road, just before entering Dubreuilville, a village built to service the Dubreuil Brothers lumber operations in the surrounding boreal forest. An access road continues east of the village to the Chapleau Crown Game Preserve, the largest game preserve in the world.

== History ==
Highway 519 was first designated in 1985. It was assumed in two portions over 1985 and 1986, with the final designation of the complete route on 1 May 1986. Gravel-surfaced over its entire length at the time of designation, paving of the highway began in 1986 and was complete by 1987.

The routing of the highway has remained the same since it was designated. It was unaffected by highway downloading in the late-1990s.

== Major intersections ==
The following table lists the major junctions along Highway 519, as noted by the Ministry of Transportation of Ontario. The entire route is located in Algoma District.

Location	km	mi	Destinations	Notes
Unorganized Algoma	0.0	0.0	Highway 17 – Wawa, White River	
Dubreuilville	30.4	18.9	Green Lake Road	Access to Chapleau Crown Game Preserve
1.000 mi = 1.609 km; 1.000 km = 0.621 mi
