= List of numbered roads in Muskoka District =

This is a list of numbered roads in the District Municipality of Muskoka, Ontario.

County Road #	Local name(s)	Southern/Western Terminus	Northern/Eastern Terminus	Settlements served	Additional Notes
1	Gravenhurst Parkway	District Road 6	King's Highway 118	Muskoka Falls	
2	Brunel Road; West Road; Ravenscliffe Road	District Road 117	Parry Sound district limits	Baysville, Newholm, Britannia Road, Huntsville, Ravenscliffe, Ilfracombe	
3	Aspdin Road; Main Street; Muskoka Road	Parry Sound district limits	King's Highway 11	Tomelin Bluffs, Aspdin, Huntsville	
4	Monck Road; Manitoba Street; Raymond Road; Windermere Road	District Road 118	5 Avenue, Windermere	Bracebridge, Falkenburg Station, Beatrice, Ufford, Dee Bank, Windermere	
5	Honey Harbour Road	Highway 400	the South Bay, Honey Harbour	Macey Bay, Honey Harbour	
6	Doe Lake Road; Housey's Rapids Road	Kawartha Lakes city (old Victoria County) limits	District Road 1	Riley Lake, Houseys Rapids, Doe Lake	
7	Peninsula Road	District Road 118	Parry Sound district limits	Port Sandfield, Gregory, Minett	
8	Limberlost Road	King's Highway 60	West Camp Lake Road	Brooks Mills, Camp Lake	
9	South Portage Road; Sherbrooke Street	District Road 2	King's Highway 60	Bona Vista, South Portage	
10	Port Sydney Road; Britannia Road	King's Highway 11	District Road 9	Port Sydney, Muskoka Lodge, Britannia Road	
11	High Street	Lake Joseph Road	Healey Lake Road	MacTier	Part of Ontario Highway 612 prior to 1997.
12	12 Mile Bay Road	O'Donnell Point Provincial Nature Reserve	Highway 400	Galla Lake, Twelve Mile Bay, Moose Deer Point native reserve	
13	Southwood Road	King's Highway 11	District Road 169	Sophers Landing, Southwood, Woodward Station	
14	Fraserburg Road	District Road 37	Pine Lake 4 Road	Bracebridge, Rocksborough, Fraserburg	
15	Santa's Village Road; Golden Beach Road	District Road 118	District Road 118	Alport, Golden Beach, Bangor Lodge	
16	Beaumont Drive; Ecclestone Drive	St. Elmo Drive	District Road 42	St. Elmo	
17	Muskoka Beach Road	Winewood Avenue East, Gravenhurst	District Road 118	Gravenhurst, Muskoka Beach	
18	Muskoka Road	District Road 169	Cliff Bay, Lake Muskoka	Gravenhurst, Muskoka Beach	
19	Beiers Road	District Road 13	King's Highway 11	none	minor connecting route
20	Doe Lake Road; Uffington Road	District Road 6	King's Highway 118	none	minor rural route
21	Fox Point Road	Echo Bay Road	King's Highway 35	Bondi Village, Lumina, Fox Point	
22	Port Cunnington Road	Arts Road	District Road 21	Port Cunnington, Bondi Village	
23	Canal Road; North Portage Road	King's Highway 60	District Road 9	Canal, North Portage, South Portage	
24	Deebank Road	District Road 4	King's Highway 141	Dee Bank, Ullswater	
25	Brackenrig Road	District Road 118	District Road 4	Brackenrig	
26	Mortimers Point Road; Foreman Road	District Road 169	District Road 118	Rossclair	
28	Juddhaven Road	District Road 7	Morinus Road	Minett, Morinus, Juddhaven	
29	Acton Island Road	District Road 169	Innisfree Road	Acton Island	
30	Barlochan Road	District Road 169	Breezy Point Road	Barlochan	
31	Yearley Road	District Road 3	Axe Lake Road	Aspdin, Stanleydale, Yearley	
32	Go Home Lake Road	Lagoon Road	Highway 400	Potters Landing	
33	South Gibson Lake Road	Highway 400	Hungry Bay Road	Gibson Lake	
34	White's Falls Road	Highway 400	Simcoe County limit.	Big Chute, Severn Falls, Coldwater	Continues eastward as Simcoe County Road 17 Upper Big Chute Road
35	Raymond Road	District Road 4	King's Highway 141	none	minor connecting route
36	Beaver Creek Drive	District Road 1	Beaver Creek Institution gates	Beaver Creek prison	
37	Cedar Lane	King's Highway 11	District Road 42	Bracebridge	
38	Kanien'kehá:ka Iohatátie (lit. 'Mohawk People Road')	Highway 400	District Road 169	Sahanatien, Bala	Formerly Secondary Highway 660
39	Main Street	King's Highway 35	District Road 117	Dorset	
41	Bethune Drive North; County Road 40	Brock Street, Gravenhurst	King's Highway 11	Gravenhurst	
42	Taylor Road; Monsell Road	District Road 4	District Road 14	Bracebridge, Monsell	
44	South Mary Lake Road	King's Highway 11	District Road 10	Port Sydney	
45	Etwell Road; Hoodstown Road	District Road 3	District Road 2	Norvern Shores, Etwell	
46	Bonnie Lake Road; Stephenson Road 1 East; Deer Lake Road	District Road 117	District Road 10	Fawn Lake	
47	Hewlitt Road; Falkenburg Road	District Road 118	District Road 4	Bardsville, Falkenburg Station	
48	South Bay Road	District Road 5	Highway 400	South Bay	
49	Canning Road	Simcoe County limits	District Road 13	Hamlet	
50	High Falls Road	District Road 4	King's Highway 11	none	minor connecting route
51	Echo Lake Road	District Road 117	South Ril Lake Road	Echo Lake, Ril Lake	
117	District Road 117	King's Highway 11	King's Highway 35	Baysville, Nith Grove, Grandview, Browns Brae, Grove Park	Formerly King's Highway 117
118	District Road 118; Wellington Street; Ecclestone Drive	District Road 169	King's Highway 11	Glen Orchard, Port Carling, Valley Green Beach, Willow Beach, Bracebridge	Formerly King's Highway 118
169	District Road 169; Bay Street; Brock Street; Bethune Drive South	Lake Joseph Road	King's Highway 11	Foot's Bay, Glen Orchard, Bala, Torrance, Hardy Lake, West Gravenhurst, Gravenhurst	Formerly King's Highway 169
