= Twinning (roads) =

Road that involves the construction of a similar road

Twinning a road involves the construction of a similar or identical parallel road. It is usually done when an existing highway requires a significant increase in capacity. Twinning is frequently advantageous because it allows traffic capacity to be doubled and produces a dual carriageway with separation between traffic directions and keeps the existing right of way. Additionally, unlike simple widening, twinning has minimal construction impact for traffic on the old road while the twin is being built.

Some freeways are constructed by bypassing an established two- or four-lane highway. The older highways, constructed before travel demand on those routes was high or before the legislation of control of access are often lined with residences, businesses, and farms. Without control of access, a municipal, state, or provincial government is obliged to provide a driveway access where the owner sees fit. In practice, road twinning projects are usually impractical in more populated regions and are more typically done through non-agricultural corridors (except in cases where the twinned highway is not grade-separated and allows driveway access) with fewer settlements and have sections of new bypasses built around the settlements that do exist.

The bypass (or sometimes an entirely-new highway) may be initially designed as a freeway, but often, the need for such a route is not immediately present. Instead, a two-lane road with no properties abutting it is constructed. A wide right-of-way is purchased in most cases so that enough property is available to simply twin the highway. Such roads are known as a Super Two and can be easily upgraded to a freeway by constructing interchanges and by twinning the road.

Twinning is often a public preference to reduce the dangers of overcrowded two-lane single carriageways, like sections of the Trans-Canada Highway.
