= Ontario Highway 169 =

Former Ontario provincial highway

King's Highway 169
- A map of Highway 169, in red (as of December 31, 1997)

Route information
- Maintained by Ministry of Transportation of Ontario
- Length: 91.40 km (56.79 mi) in 1997
- Existed: May 15, 1976–January 1, 1998
- History: part of Highway 69 prior to 1976

Major junctions
- South end: Highway 12 near Brechin
- 18.2 km (11.3 mi) concurrency with Highway 11 between Gravenhurst and Washago
- North end: Highway 69 at Foot's Bay

Location
- Country: Canada
- Province: Ontario
- Counties: Muskoka, Simcoe

Highway system
- Ontario provincial highways; Current; Former; 400-series
← Highway 148	→ Highway 400

King's Highway 169, commonly referred to as Highway 169, was a provincially maintained highway in the Canadian province of Ontario. The highway connected Highway 12 at Brechin, southeast of Orillia, with Highway 69 at Foot's Bay. The 91.40 km (56.79 mi) route included an 18.20 km (11.31 mi) concurrency with Highway 11 between Washago and Gravenhurst. Located within Simcoe County and the District Municipality of Muskoka, the highway also provided access to the community of Bala.

Highway 169, originally the southern leg of Highway 69, was created in 1976 when the latter was rerouted along Highway 103 south of Foot's Bay to Waubaushene. Highway 69 was itself established in 1936 along the eastern side of Lake Couchiching between Atherley and Washago. It was extended to Parry Sound the following year. In 1952 the highway was rerouted south of Washago to end in Brechin.

Highway 169 remained unchanged from 1976 to 1998, when it was decommissioned during the highway transfers of 1998. On January 1 of that year, the route was designated as Simcoe County Road 169 from Brechin to Washago, and Muskoka District Road 169 from Gravenhurst to Foot's Bay. Through Muskoka District, the road is also known as the Frank Miller Memorial Route.

== Route description ==
Highway 169 entered Gravenhurst along Bethune Drive.

The former route of Highway 169 has remained relatively unaltered since it was downloaded in 1998. It begins at an intersection with Highway 12 approximately 11 km (6.8 mi) north of the Trent Severn Waterway and 16 km (9.9 mi) east of the Atherley Narrows. It proceeds north at a point where Highway 12 begins to curve west towards Orillia, passing through meadows and forests and the occasional ranch. It passes through the community of Udney, curves northeast and intersects the Monck Road while curving back northwards. The Mnjikaning First Nation territory backs onto the highway at this location, but primary access is via Simcoe County Road 44. The route continues in a straight line through the communities of O'Connell and Fawkham, crossing the Black River immediately south of the latter. Gently curving to the northeast, it enters the village of Washago, after which it interchanges with Highway 11 south of the Severn River.

While Highway 169 no longer exists a provincial route, Highway 11 continues to travel north today as a divided four-lane expressway, crossing the Severn River into the Canadian Shield, where the terrain is rougher, rockier, and dotted with lakes and swamps. Former Highway 169 splits from Highway 11 at the southern entrance to Gravenhurst (Exit 169), with the latter curving to the east. The route resumes independently, exiting the expressway and entering the town through a rock cut. It follows Bethune Drive, Brock Street and Bay Street through the town. Exiting Gravenhurst, the highway follows close to the western shore of Lake Muskoka, serving recreational cottages. The route passes north of the Devils Gap Trail, which follows the old Bala–Gravenhurst Colonization Road, then passes through the community of Torrance where it encounters a junction with District Road 13.

Approximately 5 kilometres (3.1 mi) northwest of Torrance, former Highway 169 passes through Bala shortly after curving north at an intersection with District Road 38. The highway presses north, crossing both a Canadian National and Canadian Pacific railway in two separate locations. After intersecting Muskoka District Roads 29 and 26, it enters the community of Glen Orchard. Within that community, the route intersects the former western terminus of Highway 118 (which now ends at Highway 11), then gradually curves west to hug the southern shore of Lake Joseph. After a winding 10 kilometres (6.2 mi) drive west, the highway enters Foot's Bay and ends at the former route of Highway 69. NB and SB Highway 11 exits for Simcoe Road 169 still shows Highway 169 signs at the intersection near the carpool area.

== History ==
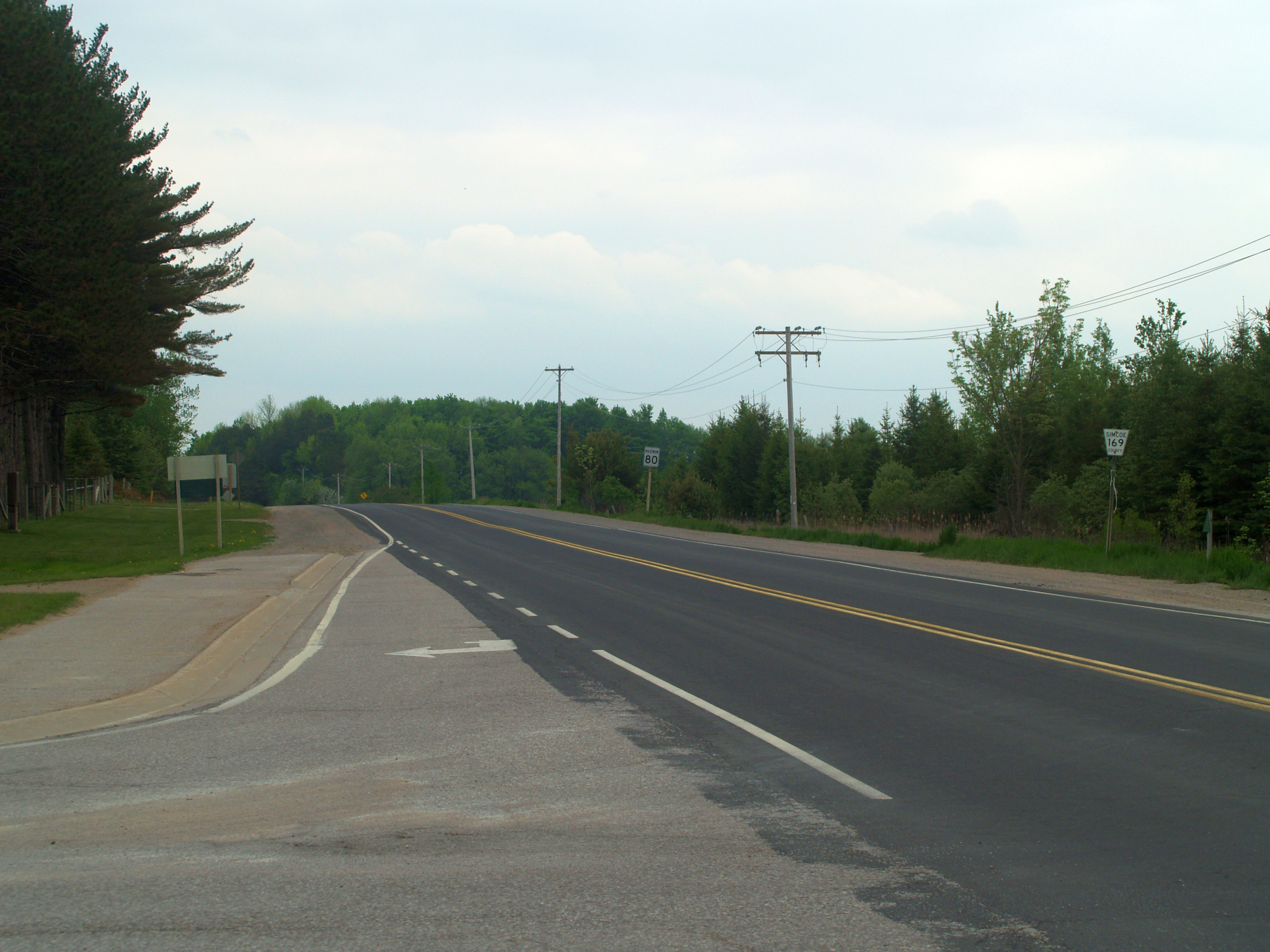
Highway 169 east of Orillia

Highway 169 was created in the mid-1970s as part of a renumbering plan of existing highways; it originally formed the southerly leg of Highway 69. Due to the complex nature of that highway, only the history of the Brechin – Foot's Bay road is covered here.

Highway 69 was first designated on August 5, 1936. At that time, it connected Atherley and Washago along the Rama Road, now Simcoe County Road 44. On April 1, 1937, the Department of Northern Development merged into the Department of Highways (DHO) (the predecessor to the modern Ministry of Transportation), opening roads north of the Severn River for improvement. The road between Gravenhurst and Parry Sound, and on to Pointe au Baril, subsequently became an extension of Highway 69, with the road between Washago and Gravenhurst becoming a concurrency with Highway 11. The section of road between Washago and Gravenhurst was assumed by the DHO on June 9, while the section between Gravenhurst and the Muskoka – Parry Sound boundary was assumed on August 25.

In 1952, the southern 17.8 kilometres (11.1 mi) of the route, along the east side of Lake Couchiching via what is now Simcoe County Road 44, was transferred to local municipalities and a new, longer route was designated to the east, merging with Highway 12 north of Brechin. This routing remained in place until May 15 1976, when the province redirected the southern portion of Highway 69 along the route of Highway 103, between Waubaushene and Foot's Bay, in order to create a more direct route between Toronto and Sudbury. The route of Highway 69 between Foot's Bay and Brechin was consequently renumbered as Highway 169.

Highway 169 remained unmodified throughout its two decades of existence. On January 1, 1998, both sections of Highway 169 were transferred to the municipalities in which they were located; the southern section was transferred to Simcoe County, and the northern section to the District Municipality of Muskoka. Both sections are still numbered 169, though they are now county roads.

== Major intersections ==
The following table lists intersections along Ontario Highway 169, as indicated in the 1997 MTO Highway Distance Table.

Division	Location	km	mi	Destinations	Notes
Simcoe	Ramara	0.00	0.00	Highway 12 – Whitby, Orillia	
Simcoe	Ramara	6.90	4.29	County Road 46 – Dalrymple	
Simcoe	Ramara	11.90	7.39	County Road 45 (Monck Road) – Sebright	
Simcoe	Washago	22.70	14.11	County Road 49 (Fairgrounds Road)	
Simcoe	Washago	24.40	15.16	County Road 44 (Rama Road)	
Simcoe	Washago	25.00	15.53	Quetton Street	
Simcoe	Washago	25.80	16.03	Highway 11 south – Orillia, Toronto	Washago Bypass; beginning of Highway 11 concurrency
Simcoe	Severn Bridge	27.30	16.96	County Road 52 east (Coopers Falls Road) – Coopers Falls; Canal Road west	
Simcoe–Muskoka boundary	Severn Bridge	28.00	17.40	Severn River bridge	
Muskoka	Severn Bridge	28.50– 28.60	17.71– 17.77	District Road 13 west (Southwood Drive)	
Muskoka	Gravenhurst	38.30– 39.70	23.80– 24.67	District Road 19 west (Sedore Road / Beiers Road)	Northbound exit located 1.40 km (0.87 mi) north of southbound exit
Muskoka	Gravenhurst	43.90	27.28	Highway 11 north – Huntsville, North Bay	End of Highway 11 concurrency
Muskoka	Gravenhurst	44.20	27.46	District Road 18 north (Muskoka Road South)	
Muskoka	Muskoka Lakes	61.70	38.34	District Road 30 (Walker's Point Road)	
Muskoka	Muskoka Lakes	67.40	41.88	District Road 13 (Southwood Road)	
Muskoka	Muskoka Lakes	71.90	44.68	District Road 38	
Muskoka	Muskoka Lakes	78.60	48.84	District Road 29 north (Acton Road)	
Muskoka	Muskoka Lakes	79.30	49.27	District Road 26 north (Mortimer's Point Road)	
Muskoka	Muskoka Lakes	81.90	50.89	Highway 118 east – Port Carling, Bracebridge	Glen Orchard
Muskoka	Muskoka Lakes	91.40	56.79	Highway 69 – Parry Sound	Foot's Bay
1.000 mi = 1.609 km; 1.000 km = 0.621 mi
