= Perry, Ontario =

Perry
- Township (single-tier)
- Township of Perry
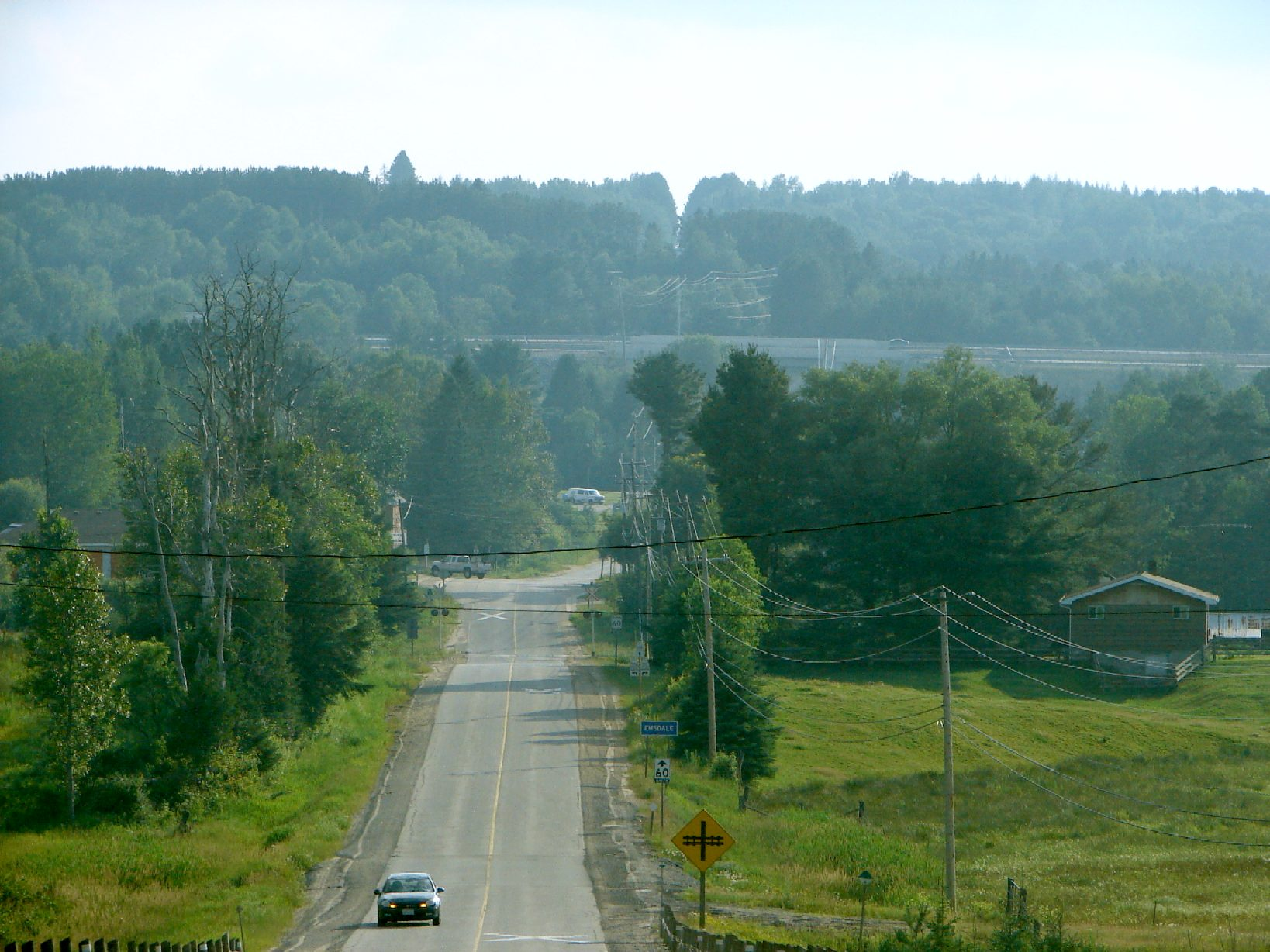
- Emsdale

- Location within Southern Ontario
- Coordinates: 45°30′N 79°17′W
- Country: Canada
- Province: Ontario
- District: Parry Sound
- Settled: 1873
- Incorporated: 1888

Government
  - Type: Township
  - Mayor: Norm Hofstetter
  - Fed. riding: Parry Sound-Muskoka
  - Prov. riding: Parry Sound—Muskoka

Area
  - Land: 186.34 km^{2} (71.95 sq mi)

Population (2021)
  - Total: 2,650
  - Density: 14.2/km^{2} (37/sq mi)
- Time zone: UTC-5 (EST)
  - Summer (DST): UTC-4 (EDT)
- Postal Code: P0A 1J0
- Area codes: 705, 249
- Website: www.townshipofperry.ca

Perry is a township in the Canadian province of Ontario, located in the Almaguin Highlands region of Parry Sound District.

== Communities ==
- Clear Lake
- Emsdale
- Novar
- Scotia
- Swindon
- Walls

== History ==
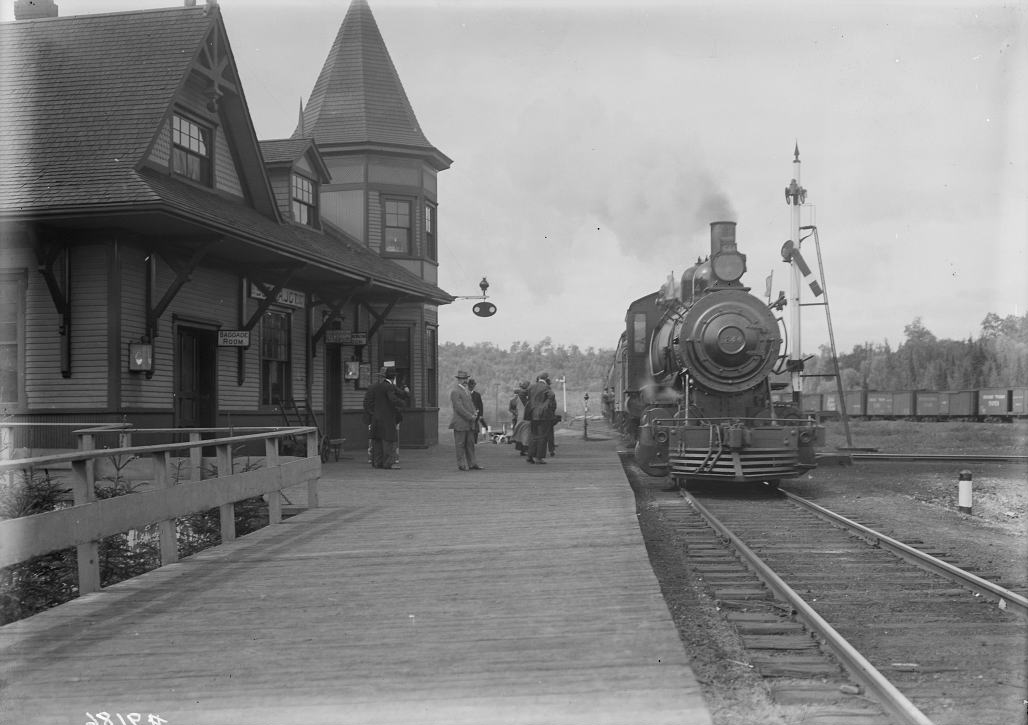
Scotia Junction GTR station in 1910

The township opened up for settlement in the 1870s. By 1878, there were about 150 families, coming mostly from southern Ontario. But the rocky land of the Canadian Shield is not well suited for agriculture, causing about 20 families to leave by 1881. The remaining settlers focused on logging and subsistence farming.

In 1885, the Northern and Pacific Junction Railway was built through the township, leading to the development of communities such as Novar, Scotia, and Emsdale, as well as accelerating the logging industry. In the 1890s, another railway, the Ottawa, Arnprior and Parry Sound Railway, brought more economic growth.

In 1888, the Township of Perry was incorporated. in the subsequent decades, there was a big population decline due to many families migrating to Western Canada. By 1920, the logging industry also began to decline, but beginning a gradual transition to the tourism and cottage economy.

== Demographics ==
In the 2021 Census of Population conducted by Statistics Canada, Perry had a population of 2,650 living in 1,144 of its 1,710 total private dwellings, a change of 8% from its 2016 population of 2,454. With a land area of 186.34 km^{2} (71.95 sq mi), it had a population density of 14.2/km^{2} (36.8/sq mi) in 2021.

Historical census populations – Perry Township

Year	Pop.	±%
1891	1,704	—
1901	1,365	−19.9%
1911	486	−64.4%
1921	1,075	+121.2%
1931	933	−13.2%
1941	961	+3.0%
1951	982	+2.2%

Year	Pop.	±%
1956	973	−0.9%
1961	980	+0.7%
1966	910	−7.1%
1971	994	+9.2%
1976	1,234	+24.1%
1981	1,449	+17.4%
1986	1,549	+6.9%

Year	Pop.	±%
1991	2,049	+32.3%
1996	2,215	+8.1%
2001	2,252	+1.7%
2006	2,010	−10.7%
2011	2,317	+15.3%
2016	2,454	+5.9%
2021	2,650	+8.0%

Source: Statistics Canada

Mother tongue (2021):

- English as first language: 94.7%
- French as first language: 1.3%
- English and French as first languages: 0.4%
- Other as first language: 3.0%

== Transportation ==
The communities of Emsdale and Novar are flag stops on Ontario Northland's intercity motor coach service along its Toronto–Barrie–Bracebridge–Huntsville–North Bay route.

== See also ==
- List of townships in Ontario
