= McMurrich/Monteith =

Township of McMurrich/Monteith
- Township (single-tier)
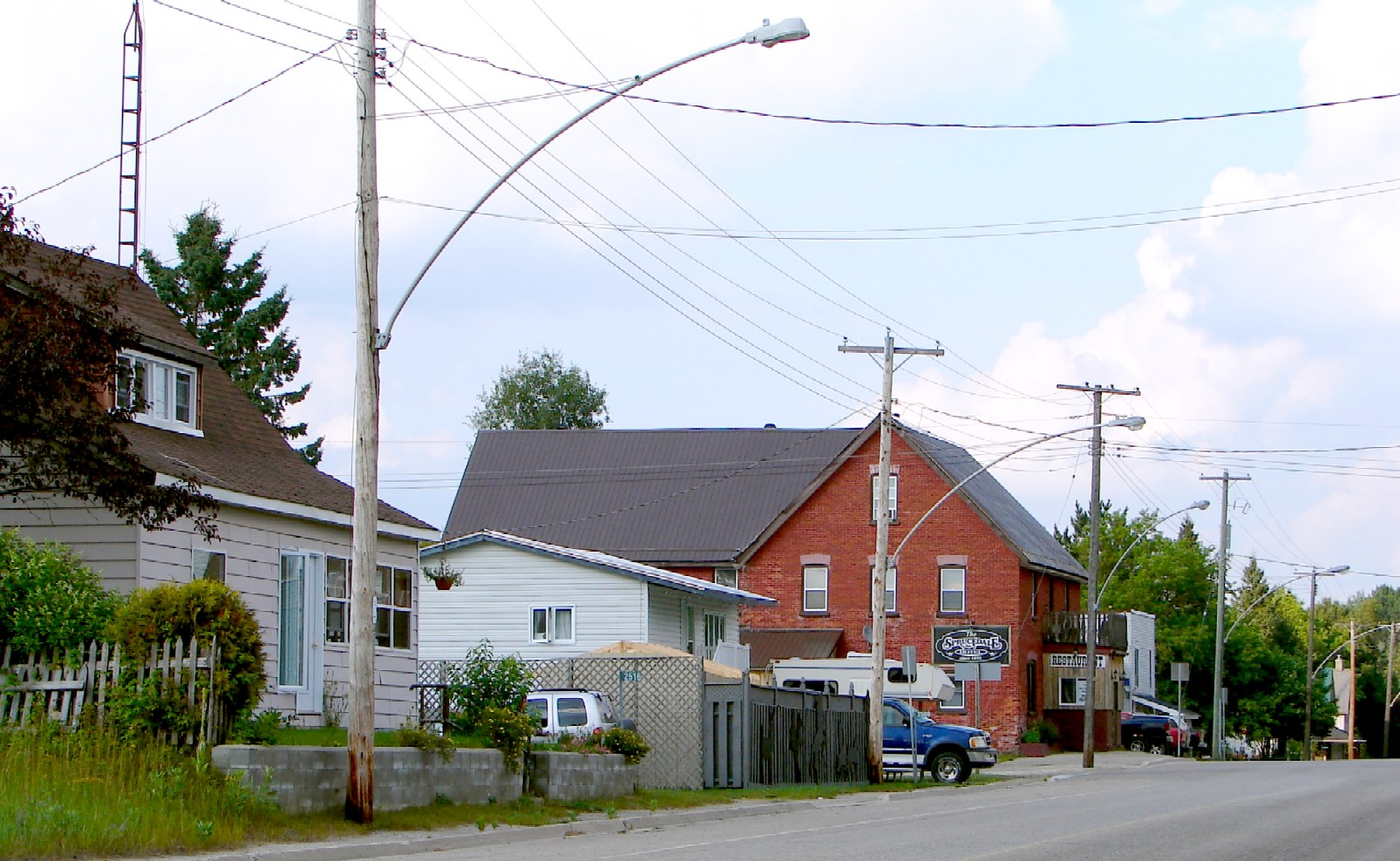
- Sprucedale

- Location within Southern Ontario
- Coordinates: 45°27′N 79°29′W
- Country: Canada
- Province: Ontario
- District: Parry Sound
- Incorporated: January 1, 1998

Government
  - Type: Township
  - Mayor: Glynn Robinson
  - Fed. riding: Parry Sound-Muskoka
  - Prov. riding: Parry Sound—Muskoka

Area
  - Land: 275.26 km^{2} (106.28 sq mi)

Population (2021)
  - Total: 907
  - Density: 3.3/km^{2} (8.5/sq mi)
- Time zone: UTC-5 (EST)
  - Summer (DST): UTC-4 (EDT)
- Postal Code: P0A
- Area codes: 705, 249
- Website: www.mcmurrichmonteith.com

McMurrich/Monteith is a municipality and census subdivision in the Almaguin Highlands region of Parry Sound District, Ontario, Canada.

The municipality was formed on January 1, 1998, through an amalgamation of the former Township of McMurrich and the eastern two-thirds of the unincorporated Township of Monteith. The remaining portion of Monteith became part of Seguin. McMurrich Township (incorporated in 1891) was named after John McMurrich, and Monteith Township was named in 1870 after Andrew Monteith.

== Geography ==
=== Communities ===
The township includes the communities of:

- Axe Lake
- Banbury
- Bear Lake
- Bourdeau
- Haldane Hill
- McMurrich
- Sprucedale
- Whitehall

=== Lakes ===
- Doe Lake
- Buck Lake
- Axe Lake
- Johnson Lake
- Hunters Lake
- Bear Lake
- Horn Lake

== Demographics ==
In the 2021 Census of Population conducted by Statistics Canada, McMurrich/Monteith had a population of 907 living in 410 of its 735 total private dwellings, a change of 10.1% from its 2016 population of 824. With a land area of 275.26 km^{2} (106.28 sq mi), it had a population density of 3.3/km^{2} (8.5/sq mi) in 2021.

Historical census populations – McMurrich/Monteith
Year	Pop.	±%
1996	723	—
2001	766	+5.9%
2006	791	+3.3%
2011	779	−1.5%
2016	824	+5.8%
2021	907	+10.1%
Source: Statistics Canada

Historical census populations – McMurrich Township (1891–1997)

Year	Pop.	±%
1901	716	—
1911	711	−0.7%
1921	784	+10.3%
1931	708	−9.7%
1941	699	−1.3%

Year	Pop.	±%
1951	552	−21.0%
1956	501	−9.2%
1961	406	−19.0%
1966	359	−11.6%
1971	405	+12.8%

Year	Pop.	±%
1976	450	+11.1%
1981	425	−5.6%
1986	489	+15.1%
1991	585	+19.6%
1996	632	+8.0%

Source: Statistics Canada

Mother tongue (2021):

- English as first language: 91.2%
- French as first language: 1.7%
- English and French as first languages: 0%
- Other as first language: 6.6%

== See also ==
- List of townships in Ontario
