= Boyne River (Parry Sound District) =

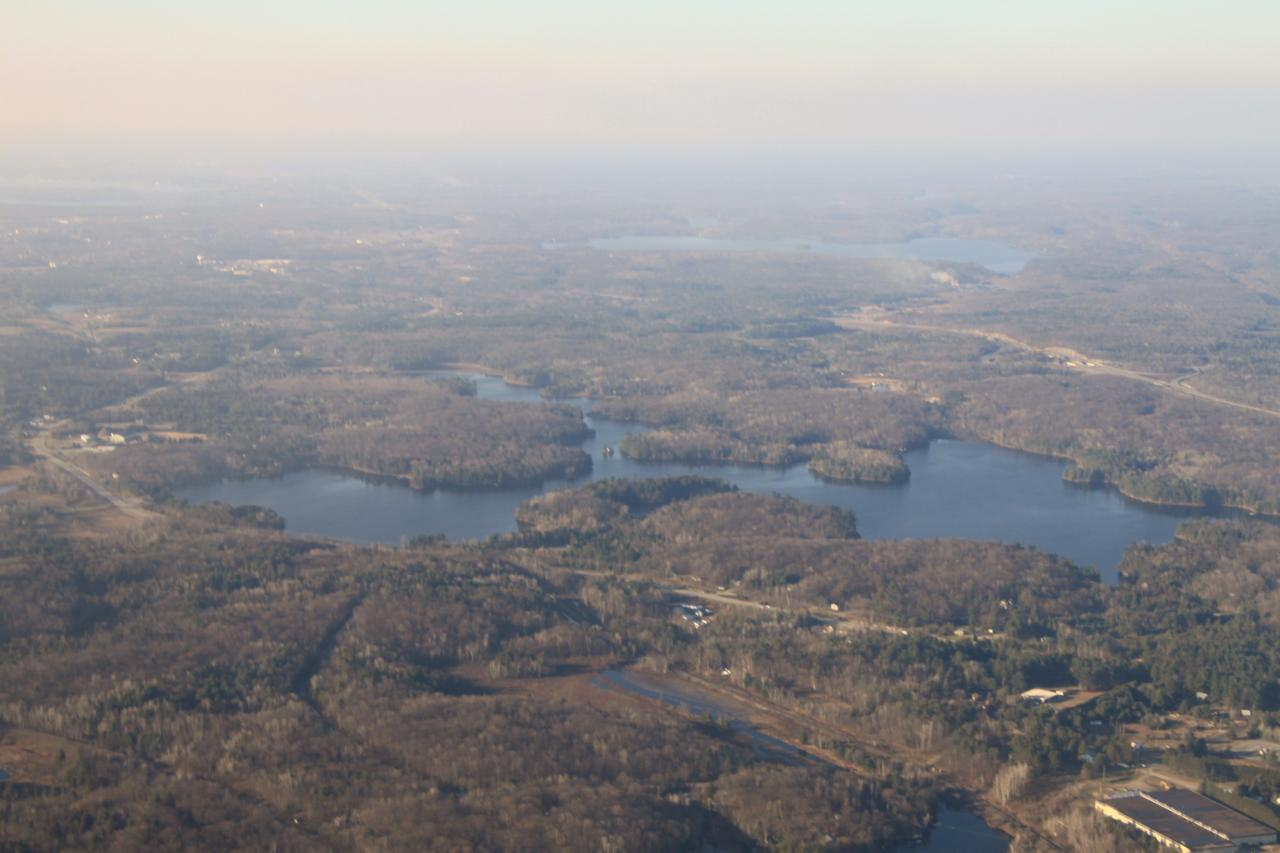
- The Boyne River flowing into Oastler Lake (lower shore, centre)

- Location of the mouth of the Boyne River in southern Ontario

Location
- Country: Canada
- Province: Ontario
- Region: Central Ontario
- District: Parry Sound
- Municipality: Seguin

Physical characteristics
- Source: Otter Lake
  - coordinates: 45°18′10″N 79°58′10″W
  - elevation: 208 m (682 ft)
- Mouth: Georgian Bay
  - coordinates: 45°18′11″N 80°02′34″W
  - elevation: 176 m (577 ft)

Basin features
- River system: Great Lakes Basin

The Boyne River is a river in the municipality of Seguin, Parry Sound District in Central Ontario, Canada. It is part of the Great Lakes Basin, and flows from Otter Lake to its mouth at Georgian Bay on Lake Huron south of the town of Parry Sound.

Oastler Lake Provincial Park is at the outflow of the Boyne River from Otter Lake to Oastler Lake.

The outflows from Otter Lake and Oastler Lake are controlled by dams.

== Sources ==
- Map 5 (PDF) (Map). 1 : 700,000. Official road map of Ontario. Ministry of Transportation of Ontario. 2010-01-01.
- Restructured municipalities - Ontario map #4 (Map). Restructuring Maps of Ontario. Ontario Ministry of Municipal Affairs and Housing. 2006. Archived from the original on 2014-04-10.
