= Oastler Lake Provincial Park =

Provincial park in Central Ontario, Canada

- IUCN category II (national park)
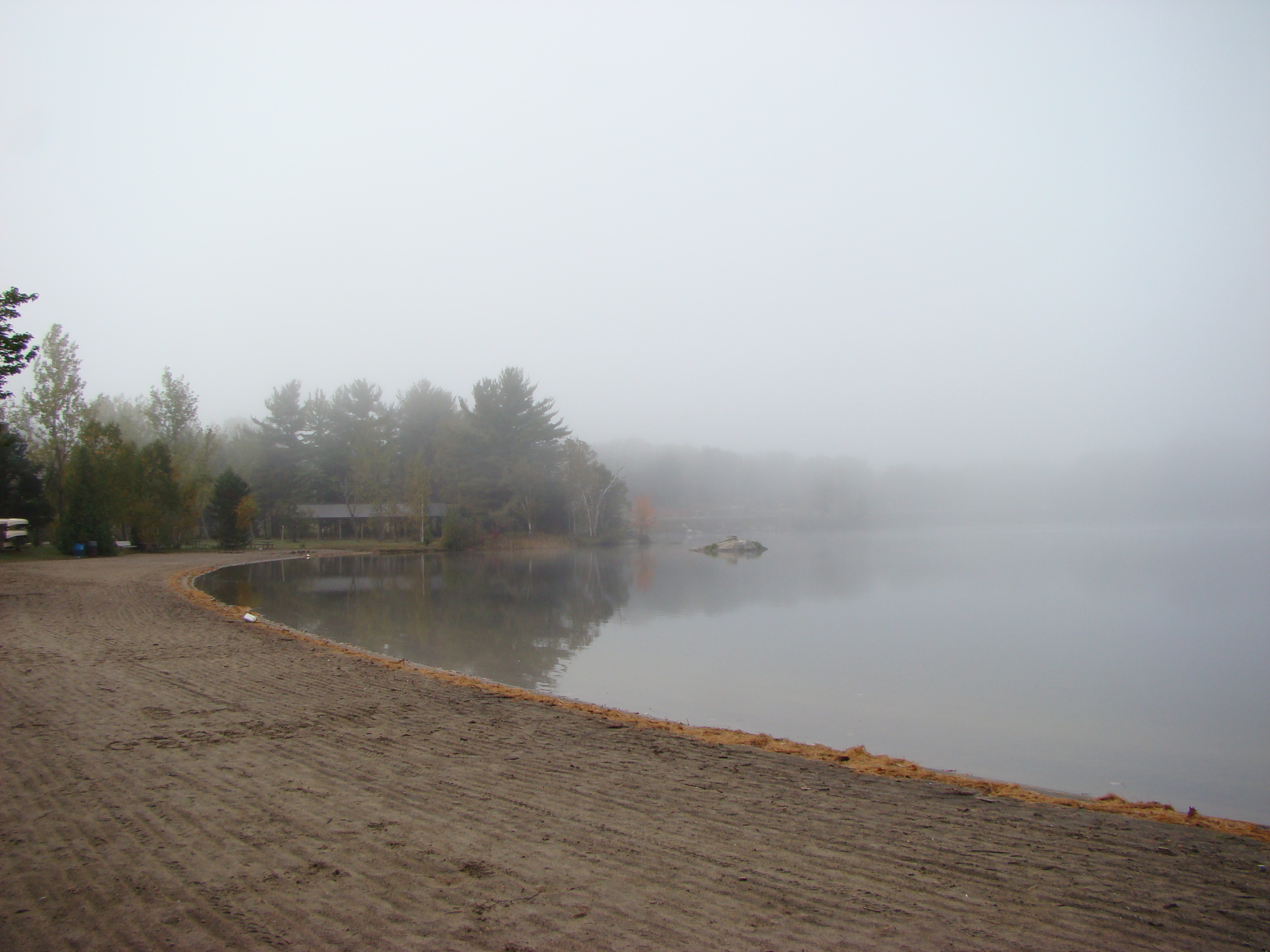
- Oastler Lake Provincial Park in 2007

- Location within Southern Ontario
- Interactive map of Oastler Lake Provincial Park
- Location: Seguin, Ontario, Canada
- Nearest city: Parry Sound
- Coordinates: 45°18′45″N 79°57′50″W
- Area: 32 hectares (80 acres)
- Visitors: 54,428 (in 2022)
- Governing body: Ontario Parks
- Website: www.ontarioparks.com/park/oastlerlake

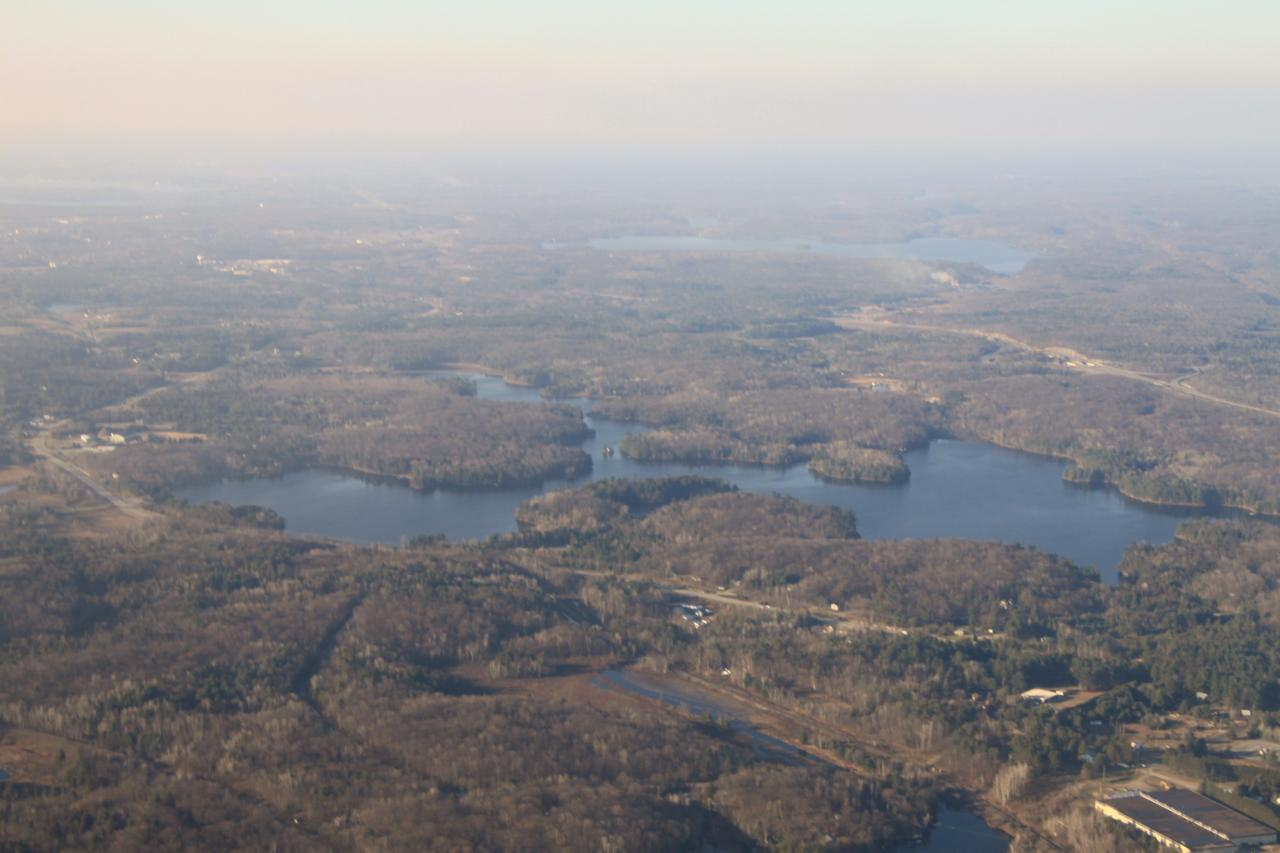
Park is on the lower centre shore of the lake at the inflow of the Boyne River.

Oastler Lake Provincial Park is a provincial park in the municipality of Seguin, Parry Sound District in Central Ontario, Canada. The nearest town, just to the northwest, is Parry Sound.

Oastler Lake is a recreation-class park, 32 hectares (79 acres) in size, on the shore of Oastler Lake where the Boyne River flows in from Otter Lake. It is located along a former alignment of Highway 69 which now has the street name Oastler Park Drive.
