= Charles W. Stockey Centre for the Performing Arts =

Performance hall and museum in Ontario, Canada

- Location within Ontario

General information
- Status: Completed
- Location: Parry Sound, Ontario, Canada, 2 Bay Street, Parry Sound, ON P2A 1S3
- Coordinates: 45°20′21″N 80°02′21″W
- Elevation: 176 m (577 ft)
- Current tenants: Festival of the Sound
- Construction started: Spring 2002
- Inaugurated: July 2003
- Cost: CAD$12.4 million

Technical details
- Floor count: 3
- Floor area: 2,500 m^{2} (26,900 sq ft)
- Lifts/elevators: 1

Design and construction
- Architecture firm: Keith Loffler Architect and ZAS (Zawadzki Armin Stevens) Architects
- Structural engineer: Carruthers & Wallace Ltd.
- Other designers: Acoustical Engineers - Artec Consultants Inc.
- Main contractor: EllisDon Limited

Other information
- Seating capacity: 480

Website
- http://www.stockeycentre.com/

The Charles W. Stockey Centre for the Performing Arts is a performance hall and sports museum in Parry Sound, Ontario, Canada. It is the primary performance venue for the annual Festival of the Sound summer classical music festival. The centre is named for Charles W. Stockey, an early and enthusiastic supporter and board member of the Festival of the Sound. Construction of the CAD$12.4-million centre was started in the spring of 2002 and the official opening took place in July 2003.

== Facilities ==
The centre sits on a 1.5-hectare (3.5-acre) site on a peninsula where the Seguin River flows into Parry Sound on Georgian Bay and adjacent to the town's harbour area. The building has 2,500 square metres (27,000 square feet) of floor space. It includes a 480-seat music hall with acoustics by Artec Consultants and the Bobby Orr Hall of Fame, celebrating the Parry Sound native and ice hockey legend Bobby Orr. The centre was designed to look and feel like a Georgian Bay cottage; wood is used extensively for structural and decorative purposes.
