= Parry Sound Area Municipal Airport =

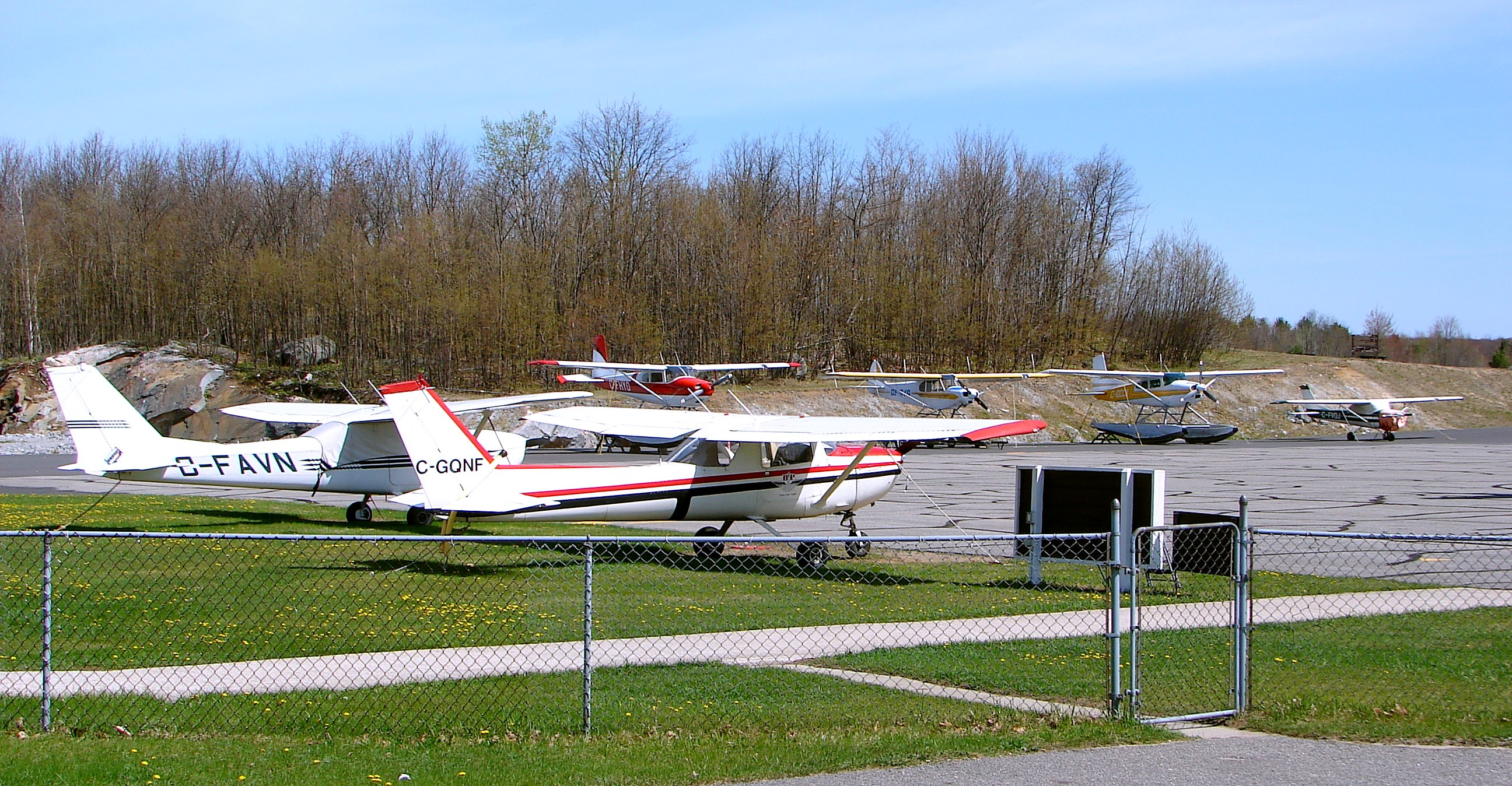
- IATA: YPD; ICAO: none; TC LID: CNK4; WMO: 71469

Summary
- Airport type: Public
- Owner: Municipally owned
- Operator: Airport Commission
- Serves: Parry Sound, Ontario, Canada
- Location: Parry Sound, Ontario
- Opened: 1979
- Time zone: EST (UTC−05:00)
  - Summer (DST): EDT (UTC−04:00)
- Elevation AMSL: 831 ft / 253 m
- Coordinates: 45°15′31″N 079°49′5″W
- Website: Parry Sound Municipal Airport

Map
- Location in Ontario CNK4 (Canada)

Runways
Direction	Length		Surface
Direction	ft	m	Surface
17/35	4,900	1,494	Asphalt
- Sources: Canada Flight Supplement; Environment Canada

Parry Sound Area Municipal Airport (IATA: YPD, TC LID: CNK4), commonly known as Parry Sound Airport, is a registered aerodrome that serves as a regional airport located in Seguin Township within the Parry Sound District in Ontario, Canada. It is used by civil aviation, air ambulances, Hydro One Helicopters, the Ontario Provincial Police, and search and rescue. It is located 12 nautical miles (22 km; 14 mi) southeast of Parry Sound.

This airport has served both the Parry Sound community and as a passage to the north since 1979. Located just north of the top of Lake Joseph, it also offers a fuel and rest point for pilots of smaller aircraft in the cottage country area. The airport offers food from its Wings Cafe, an addition since 2006.

== History ==
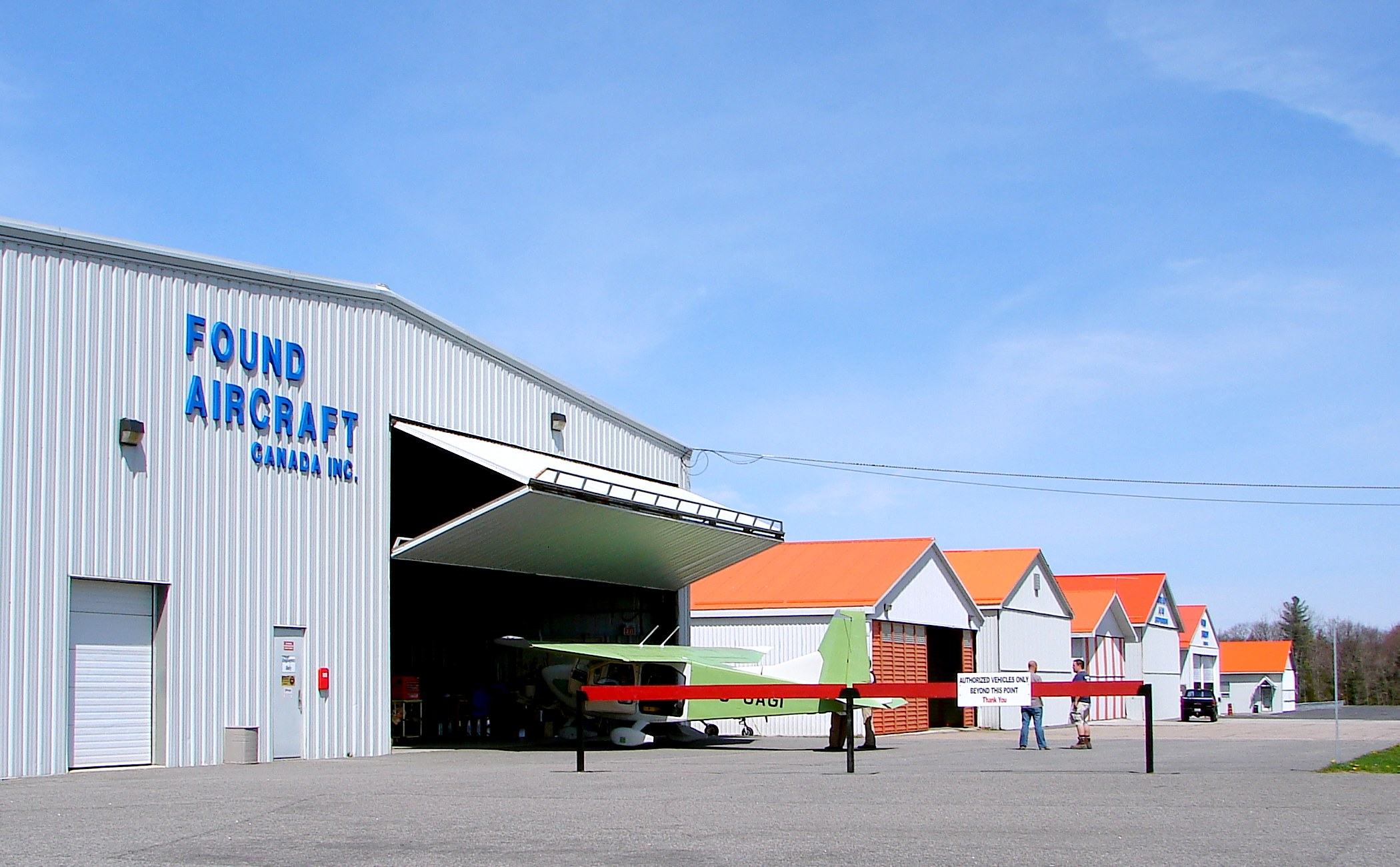
Hangars at Parry Sound Airport

=== 1970s ===
Construction of the airport began in the 1970s. Commencing in 1978, the airport's development took shape and it was officially opened to the public in the spring of 1979. At that time, it had a 3,000 ft (910 m) runway, a 200 by 250 ft (61 by 76 m) apron, and a connecting taxiway. There was an access road and a float plane base located at Robert's Lake.

=== 1980s ===
In 1981, the airport underwent an upgrade with the installation of medium-intensity airfield lighting. This allowed for flights to take place during low-light conditions.

The terminal building was constructed in 1983. The following year, in 1984, the airport underwent a master plan that would guide further development.

In 1985, the airport's runway underwent a significant extension, adding an additional 999 ft (304 m) to its length. This extension allowed larger aircraft to land and take off. Additionally, a non-directional beacon was installed on the extended runway centerline.

=== 2023 ===
In 2023, the airport further expanded & widened their runway to 100' x 4,900', and updated their runway and approach lighting. The official opening ceremony was on September 9th, 2023.

== See also ==
- List of airports in the Parry Sound area
