= Swords, Ontario =

Coordinates: 45°21′09″N 79°47′32″W

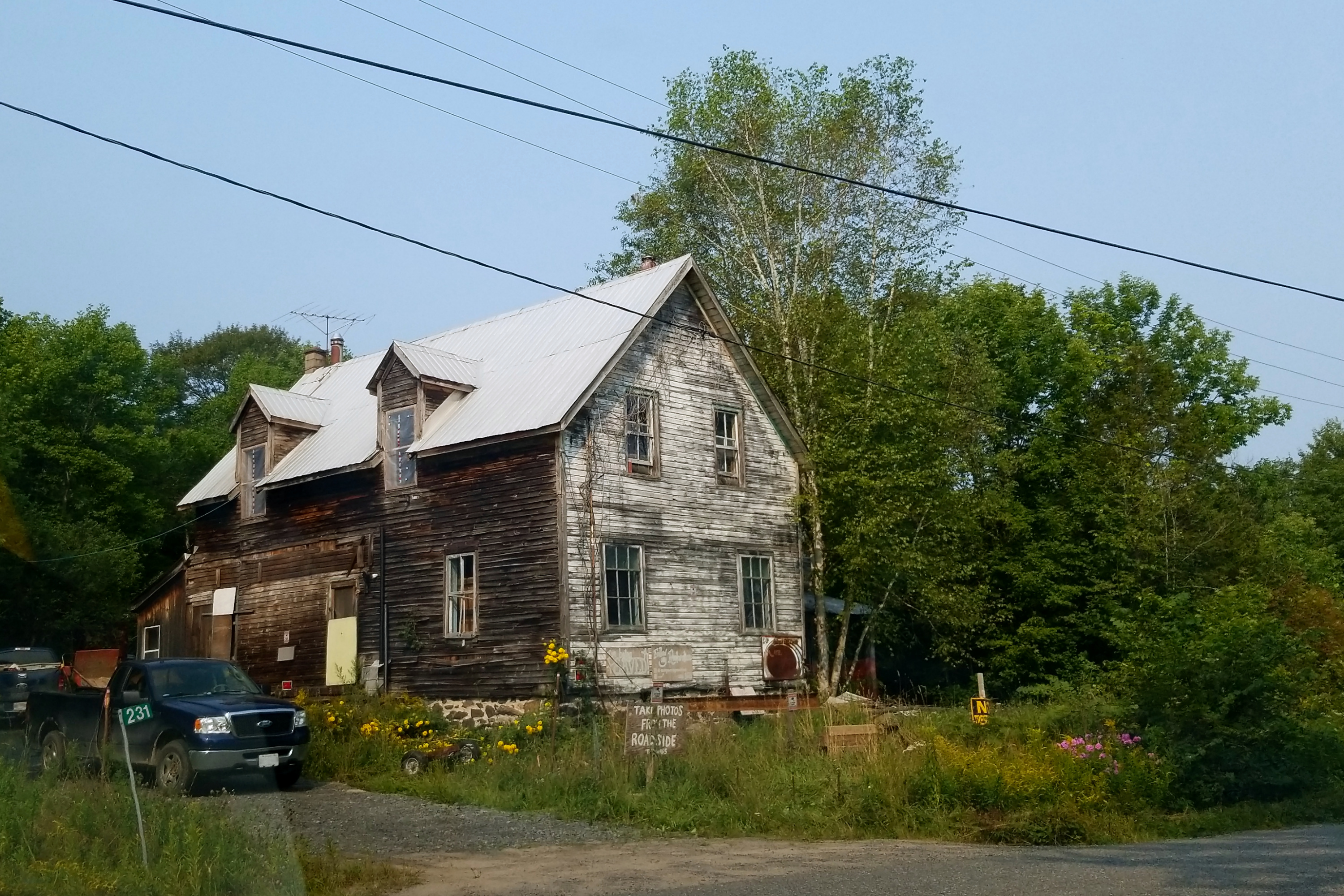
Swords General Store

Swords is a ghost town and former railway point in central Ontario, Canada, in the township of Seguin in the District of Parry Sound.

As with Seguin Falls, Swords was a whistlestop along the Booth railway. When the Ottawa, Arnprior and Parry Sound Railway came through with the railway, they built a small flag stop and siding and named it Maple Lake Station.

The railway brought lumbering to the area and in 1894 the Ludgate Lumber Company bought large amounts of land and began cutting down trees. The company built a general store and three workers homes south of the tracks. In 1904 a school house was built for the children.

In 1925 the name of the town was changed to Swords, after the Sword family who live around that area, to avoid confusion with another Maple Lake Station. The Swords were responsible for operating many of the businesses in the area and the Swords were voted to have the town named after them. One such business was the Maple Lake Hotel, owned by John and Annie Sword. Annie would stop and inspect the boots of the lumbermen to ensure that they didn't have hobnails, making them likely to scuff the hotel floor. In this case she would place a shingle over the hobnails, rendering the boots safe. The hotel stood until the late 60's or early 70's. A store still stands there to this day but has suffered several break-ins and is in a general state of disrepair. The store is now privately owned and undergoing restoration.
