= Otter Lake (Seguin, Parry Sound District, Ontario) =

Lake in Ontario, Canada

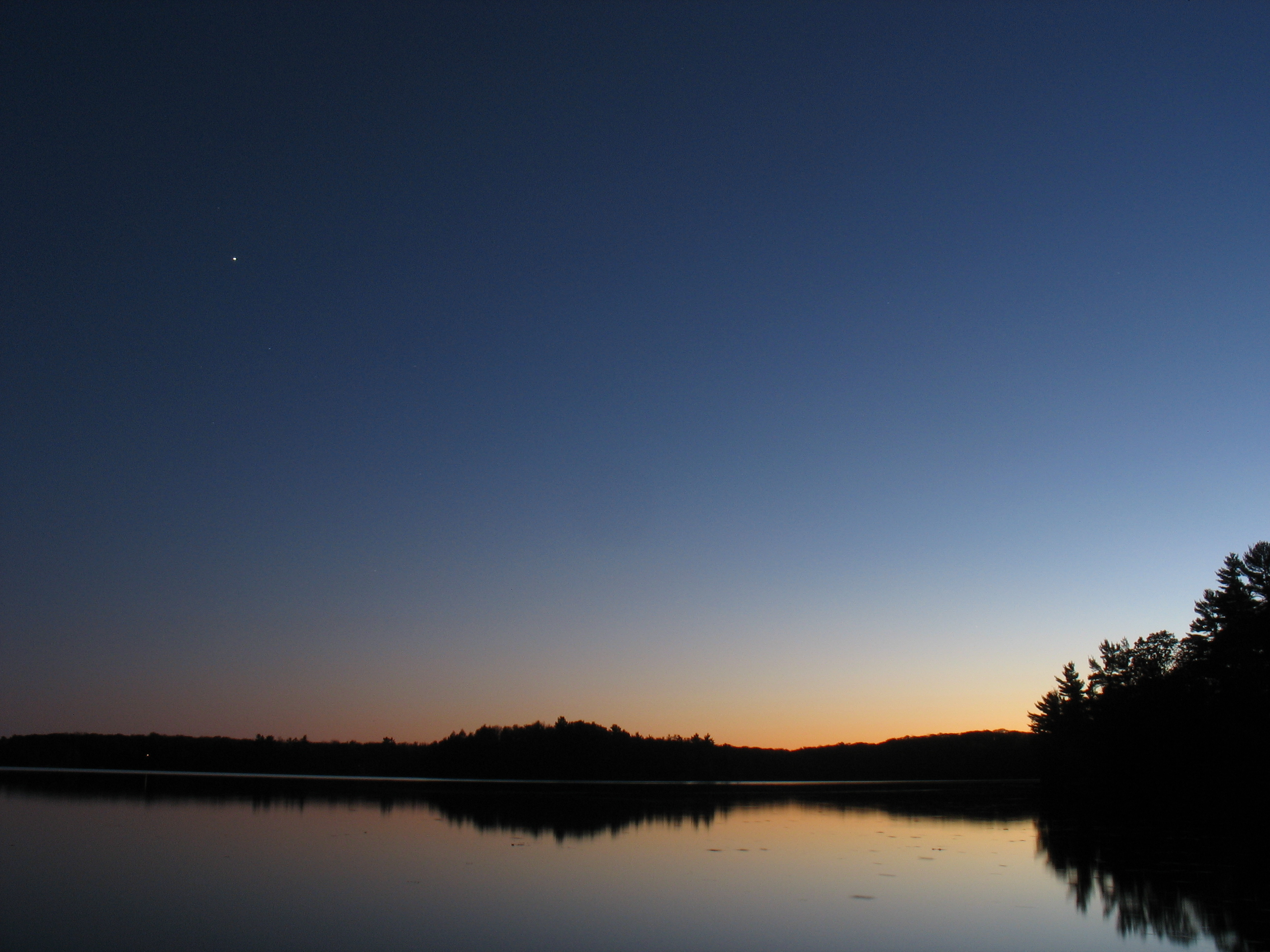
- Sunset over Otter Lake

- Location in southern Ontario
- Location: Parry Sound District, Ontario
- Coordinates: 45°16′41″N 79°58′03″W
- Type: Glacial lake, oligotrophic, dimictic
- Primary inflows: Natural springs
- Primary outflows: Boyne River
- Basin countries: Canada
- Max. length: 6.5 km (4.0 mi)
- Max. width: 7.25 km (4.50 mi)
- Surface area: 5.06 km^{2} (1,250 acres)
- Average depth: 10.8 m (35 ft)
- Max. depth: 45 m (148 ft)
- Surface elevation: 208 m (682 ft)
- Frozen: Mid-December to Late April
- Islands: Angel, Bluebell, Delta, Fair, Jean, Lillie, Mona, Robinson, Round, Rusholme, Sentinel, Woodburn
- Settlements: (None on lake)

Otter Lake is a lake in geographic Foley Township in the municipality of Seguin, Parry Sound District in Central Ontario, Canada. Otter Lake was originally named 'Nigge-Cu-Bing' (Lake of Many Otters) by the original First Nations inhabitants.

There are several segments to the lake. The "Long Arm" is a long, narrow portion which goes to the east. The "Little Long Arm" protrudes to the west. The "Little Otter" part is to the north, separated from the rest of the lake by the Otter Lake Narrows. The unincorporated places and railway points of Otter Lake and Holmur are at the narrows and on the north side of the lake respectively. The water level is controlled by a dam at the outflow to the Boyne River at the Little Otter portion of the lake.

There are over 400 cottages on the lake. The Canadian Pacific Railway and Canadian National Railway main lines both pass the lake, the former at Otter Lake Narrows and the latter on the north shore of the lake.

== See also ==
- List of lakes in Ontario
