= Festival of the Sound =

Classical music festival in Ontario, Canada

Coordinates: 45°20′45″N 80°02′17″W

Festival of the Sound is an annual classical music festival that occurs from July to August in Parry Sound, Ontario, Canada.

Established in 1979 by Anton Kuerti, the festival's original artistic director, the annual festival was held in the auditorium of Parry Sound High School until the opening of the town's Charles W. Stockey Centre for the Performing Arts in 2003. The festival presents a daily program of classical music performances by both Canadian and international musicians over a period of approximately three weeks.

Noted performers at the festival have included vocalists Russell Braun, Mary Lou Fallis, Richard Margison, and Patricia O'Callaghan; instrumentalists Yo-Yo Ma, Judy Loman, James Ehnes, Ofra Harnoy, Pinchas Zukerman, Michel Strauss, Joel Quarrington and János Starker; and pianists Menahem Pressler, Angela Hewitt, Martin Roscoe, Alexander Tselyakov, Janina Fialkowska, André Laplante, and Jan Lisiecki. The program has also occasionally included pop and jazz performers, including Catherine McKinnon, Rob McConnell, Moe Koffman, and Dizzy Gillespie. Notable ensembles that have appeared at the Festival include the New Zealand String Quartet, the St. Lawrence String Quartet, the Tokyo String Quartet, the Brodsky Quartet, the National Youth Orchestra of Canada, the National Academy Orchestra of Canada, the Gryphon Trio, and the Beaux Arts Trio. Choral Music has also been featured at the festival with performances by the Choir of Trinity College, Cambridge, the Elmer Iseler Singers, and the Toronto Mendelssohn Choir.

James Campbell is the second and current artistic director of the festival and has held that position since 1984. The 2014 festival ran from July 18 to August 10, and closed with a performance of the Beethoven Symphony No. 9 under the direction of French horn virtuoso and conductor James Sommerville with the Elmer Iseler Singers and featuring soloists Russell Braun, Leslie Fagan, Marion Newman and Michael Colvin. The 2015 festival ran from July 17 to August 9, and closed with a performance of Papageno Revisited by Alexander Brott; the Piano Concerto No. 5 in E-flat major, Op. 73 "Emperor Concerto" by Ludwig van Beethoven; and the Symphony No. 9 in E minor, "From the New World," Op. 95, B. 178 by Antonín Dvořák. The performance was conducted by Boris Brott and featured pianist Stewart Goodyear with the National Academy Orchestra of Canada.
