= The Massasauga Provincial Park =

Provincial park in Ontario

- IUCN category II (national park)
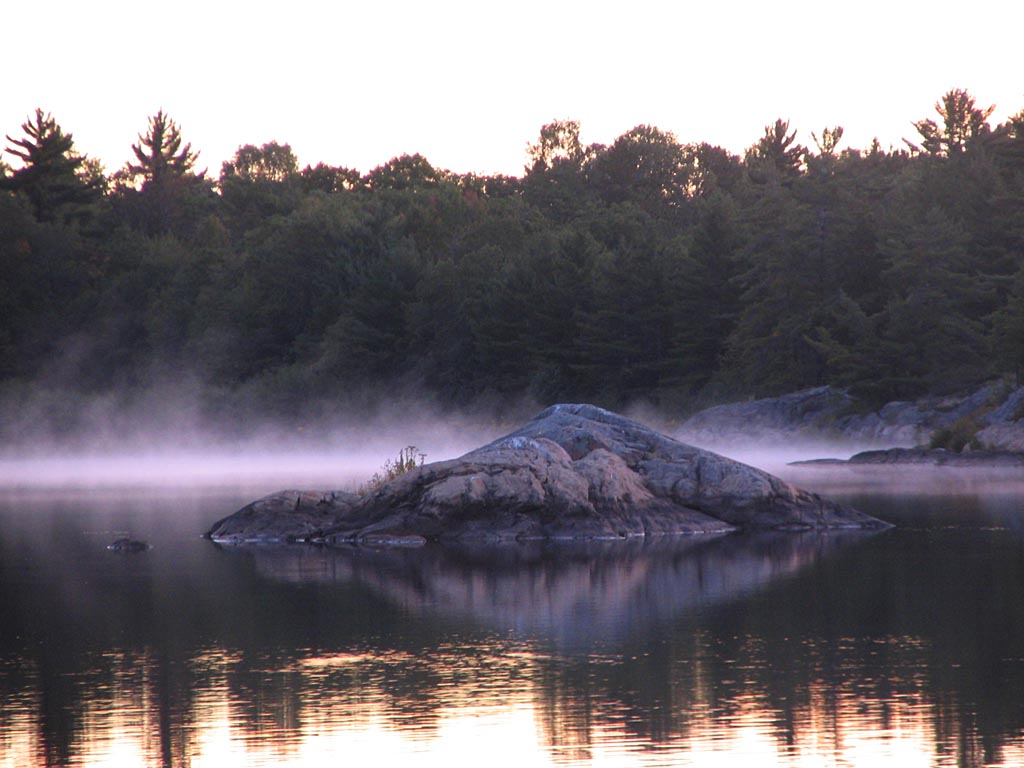
- Moon Island

- Location within Southern Ontario
- Interactive map of The Massasauga Provincial Park
- Location: Parry Sound District, Ontario, Canada
- Nearest city: Parry Sound, Ontario
- Coordinates: 45.226°N 80.056°W
- Area: 131.05 km^{2} (50.60 sq mi)
- Established: 1989
- Visitors: 24,257 (in 2022)
- Governing body: Ontario Parks
- Website: https://www.ontarioparks.ca/park/themassasauga

The Massasauga Provincial Park is a provincial park in Parry Sound District, Ontario, Canada, stretching from the town of Parry Sound south to the Moon River. The park has an area of 131.05 km^{2} (50.60 sq mi).

The park encompasses hundreds of islands on the coast of Georgian Bay and many inland lakes including Clear Lake and Spider Lake. Classified as a "Natural Environment" park, it contains no roads, so camping is limited to interior sites. The sites on the bay can be reached by motor boat whereas those on the lakes are typically reached by non-motorized craft such as canoes or kayaks. The park also has mooring anchors for boats to overnight in some inlets on Georgian Bay.

An interpretive trail is located on Wreck Island. A multi-day backpacking trail in the northern part of the park, the Nipissing-North Arm Orienteering Trail, is used for orienteering. This wilderness trail is uncleared and only minimally marked.

The park contains a striking landscape of windswept pines clinging to smooth granite-striped rocks, towering cliffs, narrow bays and inlets. On a typical visit to the park one might see wildlife common to the Near-North area of Ontario such as snapping turtles, loons, bears, great blue herons and otters but also wildlife typical of the Great Lakes such as cormorants, eagles, and ducks.

"Massasauga" means "mouth of the river" in Ojibwe. The name also refers to the massasauga rattlesnake, which is found in the area.

The park is home to the following notable animals:

- Massasauga rattlesnake (Ontario's only venomous snake)
- Prairie warblers
- Five-lined skink (Ontario's only lizard)
- Map turtles
