= Wayne Clairmont =

Canadian ice hockey player

- Born: July 5, 1943 (age 81); Parry Sound, Ontario, Canada
- Height: 5 ft 9 in (175 cm)
- Weight: 170 lb (77 kg; 12 st 2 lb)
- Position: Left wing
- Shot: Left
- Played for: Nashville Dixie Flyers
- Playing career: 1958–1976

Wayne Francis Clairmont (born July 5, 1943) is a Canadian former professional hockey player who played 511 games in the Eastern Hockey League for the Nashville Dixie Flyers.
