= Parry Sound CPR Trestle =

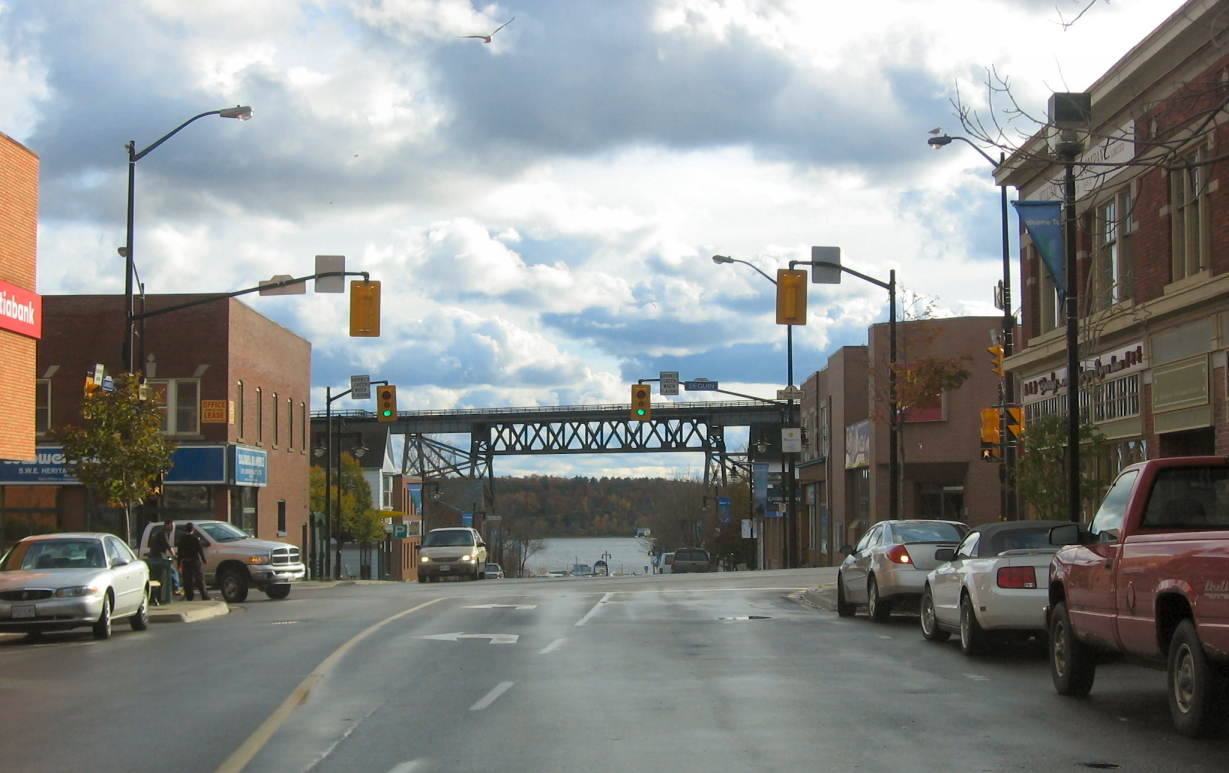
- Trestle viewed from downtown Parry Sound
- Coordinates: 45°20′27″N 80°01′58″W
- Carries: CPKC (Northbound only); CNR (Northbound only)
- Crosses: Seguin River
- Locale: Parry Sound, Ontario, Canada

Characteristics
- Material: Concrete, steel
- Total length: 1,695 feet (517 m)
- Height: 105 feet (32 m)

History
- Construction end: 1907
- Inaugurated: 1908

The Parry Sound CPR Trestle crosses the valley of the Seguin River, just upstream of the river's mouth at Parry Sound on Georgian Bay, as well as Great North Road, Bay, and Gibson streets in the town of Parry Sound, Ontario, Canada.

Completed in 1907 by the Canadian Pacific Railway, the trestle is 1,695 feet (517 m) long and 105 feet (32 m) high. The first scheduled train passed over the span in 1908.

In July 1914, Tom Thomson (who inspired the Group of Seven) visited Parry Sound and painted the bridge and the former Parry Sound Lumber Company.

Today the trestle provides northbound rail traffic for both the Canadian Pacific Kansas City Railway and the Canadian National Railway while all southbound traffic uses Canadian National trackage. This sharing of resources was adopted by the competing companies as a way of alleviating congestion in Central Ontario.
