= Fred Bergdinon =

Canadian ice hockey player (1906–1995)

- Born: June 22, 1906 Parry Sound, Ontario, Canada
- Died: March 18, 1995 (aged 88)
- Height: 6 ft 1 in (185 cm)
- Weight: 170 lb (77 kg; 12 st 2 lb)
- Position: Right wing
- Shot: Left
- Played for: Boston Bruins
- Playing career: 1925–1925

Frederick George Bergdinon (June 22, 1906 — March 4, 1995), also known as Fred Bourdginon, was a Canadian ice hockey right winger. He played two games for the Boston Bruins of the National Hockey League (NHL) during the 1925–26 season.

Bourdginon was born in Parry Sound, Ontario. He played junior hockey for Parry Sound in the Ontario Hockey Association (OHA) from 1922 until 1924. He was signed as a free agent by Boston Bruins on December 14, 1925 and made a late appearance the following day, a 2-1 loss to the played two games for the Bruins that season. His first game came on December 11 against the Pittsburgh Pirates, and the second was on December 15 against the Ottawa Senators.

Bourdginon died in a 1995 car crash, along with his son John.

== Career statistics ==
=== Regular season and playoffs ===
			Regular season					Playoffs
Season	Team	League	GP	G	A	Pts	PIM	GP	G	A	Pts	PIM
1922–23	Parry Sound	OHA	—	—	—	—	—	—	—	—	—	—
1923–24	Parry Sound	OHA	—	—	—	—	—	—	—	—	—	—
1925–26	Boston Bruins	NHL	2	0	0	0	0	—	—	—	—	—
NHL totals			2	0	0	0	0	—	—	—	—	—
