= Parry Sound, Ontario =

Parry Sound
- Town (single-tier)
- Town of Parry Sound
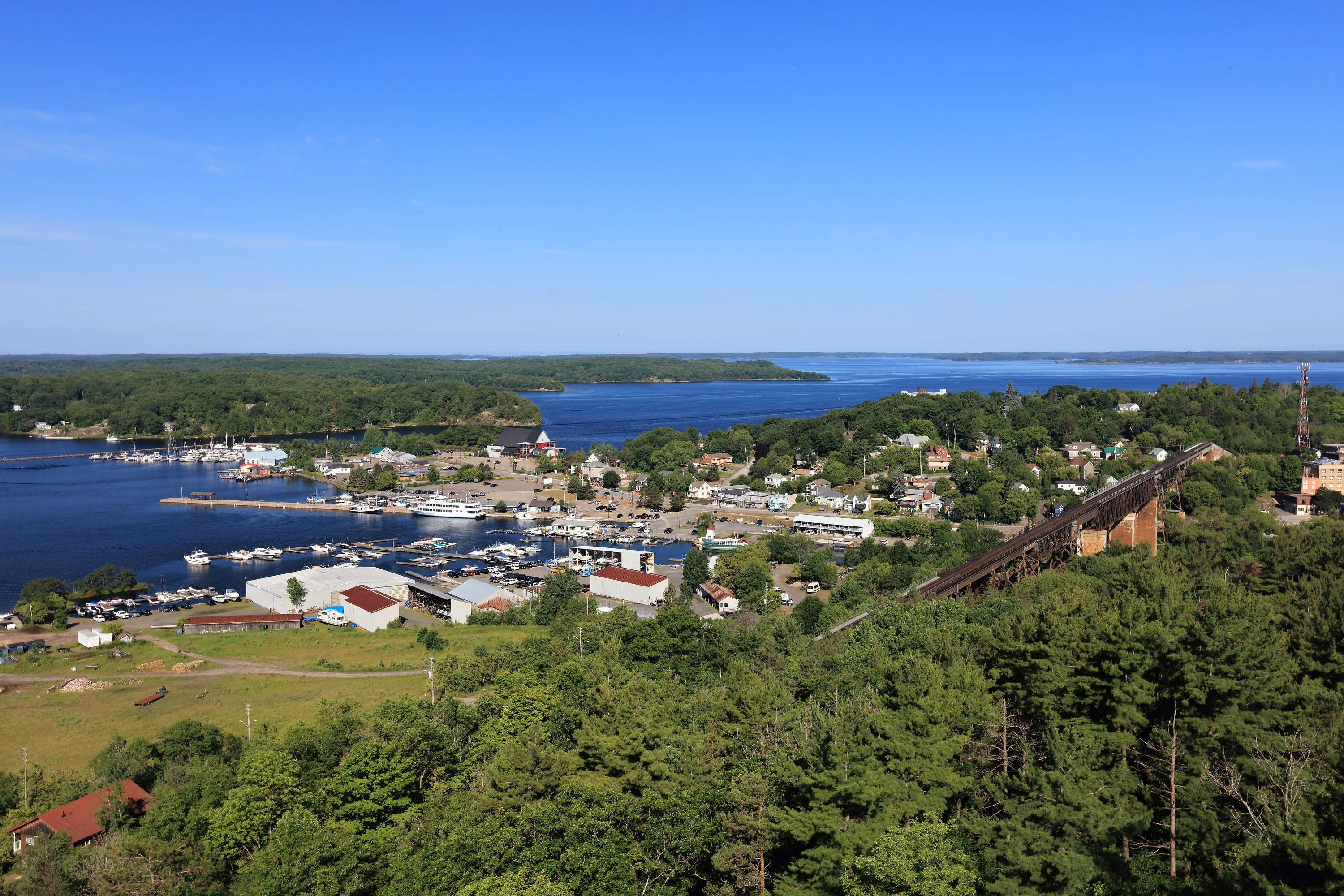
- Tower view (2016) of the town and the sound

- Flag Coat of arms

- Location within Southern Ontario
- Coordinates: 45°21′14″N 80°02′10″W
- Country: Canada
- Province: Ontario
- District: Parry Sound
- Established: 1857

Government
  - Mayor: Jamie McGarvey
  - Governing Body: Parry Sound Town Council
  - MP: Scott Aitchison (CPC)
  - MPPs: Graydon Smith (PC)

Area
  - Land: 13.10 km^{2} (5.06 sq mi)

Population (2021)
  - Total: 6,879
  - Density: 524.9/km^{2} (1,359/sq mi)
- Demonym: Parry Sounder
- Time zone: UTC−05:00 (EST)
  - Summer (DST): UTC−04:00 (EDT)
- Forward sortation area: P2A
- Area code(s): 705 & 249
- Highways: Highway 69; Highway 400 / TCH; Highway 124; Highway 518
- Website: www.townofparrysound.com

Parry Sound is a town in Ontario, Canada, located on the eastern shore of the sound after which it is named. Parry Sound is located 160 km (99 mi) south of Sudbury and 225 km (140 mi) north of Toronto. It is a single-tier government located in the territorial District of Parry Sound, which has no second-tier county, regional, or district level of government. Parry Sound is a popular cottage country region for Southern Ontario residents. It also has the world's deepest natural freshwater port.

== History ==
There was a slight decline in economic activity shortly after World War I with J.R. Booth's construction of a rival town, Depot Harbour, on nearby Parry Island, but this setback was overcome through later developments in tourism and commerce, and the accidental destruction by fire of the entire town of Depot Harbour on August 14, 1945.

The body of water that gives the town its name was surveyed and named by Captain (later Admiral) Henry Wolsey Bayfield in the 19th century in honour of the Arctic explorer Sir William Edward Parry. In 1857, the modern townsite was established near the Ojibwa village of Wasauksing ("shining shore") at the mouth of the Seguin River. The post office was established in 1865. Parry Sound was incorporated as a town in 1887. In the late 19th century, rail service was established, making the town an important depot along the rail lines to Western Canada.

In 1916, a cordite factory was established in the nearby town of Nobel for the Imperial Munitions Board. In the late 1920s and early 1930s, an explosives and munitions factory was also built at Nobel, making Parry Sound an important part of both the First World War and the Second World War effort.

=== Forest fire protection history ===
The Parry Sound Forest Fire District was founded by Ontario's former Department of Lands and Forests (now the MNR) in 1922 as one of 17 districts to help protect Ontario's forests from fire by early detection from fire towers. The headquarters for the district were housed in town. It was the central location for 18 fire tower lookouts, including the Parry Sound fire tower, which was erected in the same location as the modern lookout tower at 17 George Street. In the 1970s all the towers had been decommissioned as aerial firefighting techniques were employed. Fire suppression is of enhanced concern in and near Parry Sound due to this area's strong tendency toward drier weather coinciding with the period of highest sun, in June and July. In years with drier summers, drought can be a significant concern here, and with it, heightened wildfire risk.

== Geography ==
=== Climate ===
Parry Sound has a humid continental climate, with local variations in cloudiness and precipitation resulting from its location on the eastern shore of the large body of water, comprising Parry Sound and Lake Huron to its west. Parry Sound's annual temperature regime reflects a cool summer humid continental climate (Köppen Dfb), with January average temperatures of −9.0 °C (15.8 °F) and July average temperatures near 20.2 °C (68.4 °F), and the usual minimal seasonal lag typical of continental climates: i.e. January as the coldest month and July as the warmest.

Much more unusual (for Dfb climates) is Parry Sound's average annual cycle of precipitation, and cloudiness vs. sunshine. With its location on the eastern side of large bodies of water, where prevailing winds and weather come from the west (typical in the mid-latitude Northern Hemisphere), Parry Sound experiences an exceptionally strong lake effect. From spring to mid-summer, this means lake waters are cooler than nearby land areas, resulting in diminished intensity of low pressure systems and less precipitation, but alternation of low clouds and fog (resulting from warmer air passing over snow-covered ground, frequent into May most years) with occasional sunshine, especially once the long winter's snow cover has melted (mostly May through July). Parry Sound's average driest month is July; here, thunderstorms are rare, due to cool lake waters inhibiting the combination of heat and humidity that fuels thunderstorm activity over areas like the central, southern and eastern United States.

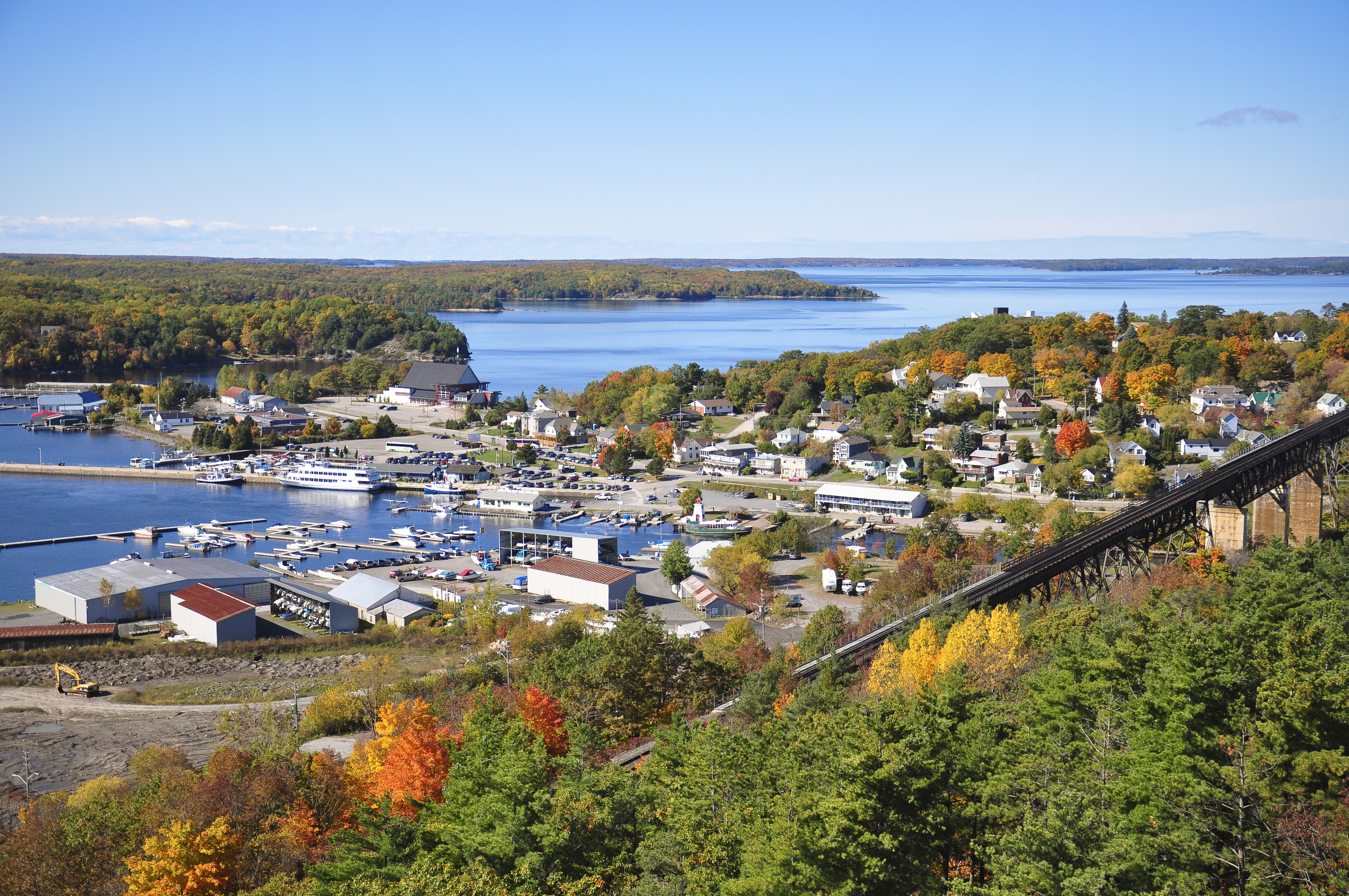
Aerial view of Parry Sound in autumn

From September to January in Parry Sound the lake effect reverses its stabilizing effect from spring into mid-summer, becoming destabilizing. During these months, nearby waters release their stored warmth from the summer season, and increasingly strong polar and Arctic air outbreaks pass over these still-relatively-warm waters before hitting Parry Sound. This results in heavy cumulus cloud formation, instability rain showers (in September and October), transitioning toward heavy snow showers and squalls as temperatures continue to drop from November to January. Parry Sound's average monthly precipitation exceeds 100 mm (3.9 in) inches every month from September to January - but this pattern peaks in December, the year's average wettest month, which averages over 137 mm (5.4 in) of precipitation, mostly carried by that month's average of 101.6 cm (40.0 in) of snow, followed by January's snowfall average of 91.2 cm (35.9 in). Such heavy winter-month precipitation and snowfall figures are virtually nonexistent in humid continental climates, which tend to exist away from large bodies of water. As winter transitions toward spring, snowfall drops sharply by March, when lake and land temperatures nearly equalize. In winter, the heavy lake-effect snowfall is augmented by snowfall from sometimes-strong low-pressure systems (mid-latitude cyclones) that often converge on the Great Lakes and areas further east.

Overall, Parry Sound experiences a typical humid continental, cool-summer climate type in terms of temperatures - but a highly unusual climate regime in precipitation and cloudiness; the year's driest months are generally from March through July, while its wettest months are from September to January, with autumnal lake effect producing cloudy skies and heavy rainfall from September into November, followed by extremely heavy snowfall in December and January.

The highest temperature ever recorded in Parry Sound was 37.8 °C (100.0 °F) on July 6, 1921. The coldest temperature ever recorded was −41.1 °C (−42 °F) on February 12. 1967.

Climate data for Parry Sound, 1981−2010 normals, extremes 1875−present
Month	Jan	Feb	Mar	Apr	May	Jun	Jul	Aug	Sep	Oct	Nov	Dec	Year
Record high °C (°F)	13.9 (57.0)	14.4 (57.9)	27.0 (80.6)	31.0 (87.8)	32.5 (90.5)	36.1 (97.0)	37.8 (100.0)	37.2 (99.0)	35.0 (95.0)	28.9 (84.0)	21.7 (71.1)	15.5 (59.9)	37.8 (100.0)
Mean daily maximum °C (°F)	−4.4 (24.1)	−2.2 (28.0)	2.6 (36.7)	10.5 (50.9)	16.9 (62.4)	21.1 (70.0)	25.1 (77.2)	23.8 (74.8)	19.0 (66.2)	12.4 (54.3)	5.1 (41.2)	−1.4 (29.5)	10.7 (51.3)
Daily mean °C (°F)	−9.0 (15.8)	−6.8 (19.8)	−2.2 (28.0)	5.7 (42.3)	11.8 (53.2)	16.2 (61.2)	20.2 (68.4)	19.2 (66.6)	14.8 (58.6)	8.4 (47.1)	1.9 (35.4)	−5.2 (22.6)	6.3 (43.3)
Mean daily minimum °C (°F)	−13.5 (7.7)	−11.4 (11.5)	−7 (19)	0.9 (33.6)	6.7 (44.1)	11.2 (52.2)	15.3 (59.5)	14.6 (58.3)	10.5 (50.9)	4.4 (39.9)	−1.3 (29.7)	−8.9 (16.0)	1.8 (35.2)
Record low °C (°F)	−38.9 (−38.0)	−41.1 (−42.0)	−34.4 (−29.9)	−22.8 (−9.0)	−8.9 (16.0)	−0.6 (30.9)	2.8 (37.0)	0.6 (33.1)	−4.4 (24.1)	−12.2 (10.0)	−28.9 (−20.0)	−37.8 (−36.0)	−41.1 (−42.0)
Average precipitation mm (inches)	107.0 (4.21)	80.3 (3.16)	78.7 (3.10)	71.4 (2.81)	83.4 (3.28)	64.2 (2.53)	54.9 (2.16)	82.7 (3.26)	105.2 (4.14)	114.8 (4.52)	110.2 (4.34)	137.6 (5.42)	1,090.5 (42.93)
Average rainfall mm (inches)	15.9 (0.63)	20.0 (0.79)	44.7 (1.76)	61.0 (2.40)	83.0 (3.27)	64.2 (2.53)	54.9 (2.16)	82.7 (3.26)	105.2 (4.14)	114.6 (4.51)	80.8 (3.18)	36.0 (1.42)	763.0 (30.04)
Average snowfall cm (inches)	91.2 (35.9)	60.3 (23.7)	34.0 (13.4)	10.4 (4.1)	0.40 (0.16)	0.0 (0.0)	0.0 (0.0)	0.0 (0.0)	0.0 (0.0)	0.18 (0.07)	29.5 (11.6)	101.6 (40.0)	327.5 (128.9)
Average precipitation days (≥ 0.2 mm)	20.1	14.7	14.0	13.9	13.6	12.8	8.9	12.3	14.2	16.7	17.6	19.6	178.5
Average rainy days (≥ 0.2 mm)	4.7	3.8	7.7	12.2	13.6	12.8	8.9	12.3	14.2	16.7	14.0	6.5	127.4
Average snowy days (≥ 0.2 cm)	18.0	12.5	8.6	3.5	0.18	0.0	0.0	0.0	0.0	0.09	7.0	16.2	66.0
Source: Environment Canada

== Demographics ==
Canada 2006 Census		Population	% of Total Population
Visible minority group Source:	South Asian	35	0.6
Visible minority group Source:	Chinese	40	0.7
Visible minority group Source:	Black	10	0.2
Visible minority group Source:	Filipino	0	0
Visible minority group Source:	Latin American	15	0.3
Visible minority group Source:	Southeast Asian	0	0
Visible minority group Source:	Other visible minority	15	0.3
Total visible minority population		115	2.1
Aboriginal group Source:	First Nations	165	2.9
Aboriginal group Source:	Métis	110	2
Aboriginal group Source:	Inuit	0	0
Total Aboriginal population		280	5
White		5,205	92.9
Total population		5,600	100

In the 2021 Census of Population conducted by Statistics Canada, Parry Sound had a population of 6,879 living in 3,197 of its 3,518 total private dwellings, a change of 7.4% from its 2016 population of 6,408. With a land area of 13.1 km^{2} (5.1 sq mi), it had a population density of 525.1/km^{2} (1,360.0/sq mi) in 2021.

According to the 2021 census, the median total income of economic families in 2020 was $87,000.

Historical census populations – Parry Sound, Ontario

Year	Pop.	±%
1871	1,052	—
1901	2,884	+174.1%
1911	3,429	+18.9%
1921	3,546	+3.4%
1931	3,512	−1.0%
1941	5,765	+64.2%

Year	Pop.	±%
1951	5,183	−10.1%
1961	6,004	+15.8%
1971	5,842	−2.7%
1981	6,124	+4.8%
1991	6,125	+0.0%
1996	6,326	+3.3%

Year	Pop.	±%
2001	6,124	−3.2%
2006	5,818	−5.0%
2011	6,191	+6.4%
2016	6,408	+3.5%
2021	6,879	+7.4%

Source: Statistics Canada

== Culture ==
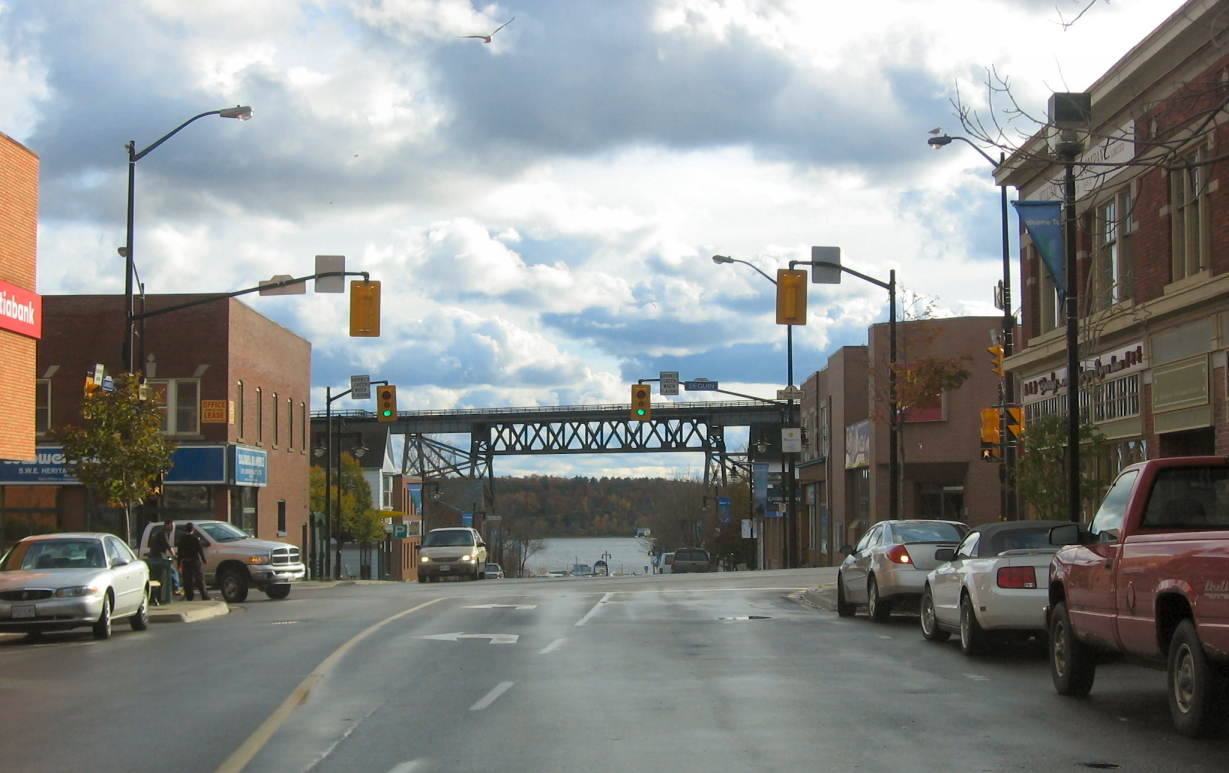
View of downtown Parry Sound near the intersection of Seguin and James Streets. A portion of the Sound and the CP railway trestle can be seen in the distance.

Parry Sound is the birthplace of hockey legend Bobby Orr, the namesake of the local community centre and the town's own Bobby Orr Hall of Fame. In Orr's best-selling autobiography, Orr: My Story, he speaks highly of Parry Sound, the friends and family who resided there and the happy childhood he had living in that part of Canada.

Canadian actor Don Harron's stage character Charlie Farquharson remains one of the town's most cherished personalities. Former Ontario premier Ernie Eves also called the town home for many years; he was the MPP for the Parry Sound—Muskoka riding from 1981 through 2001.

The town is home to several cultural festivals, including the Festival of the Sound classical music festival and a buskers' festival which takes place as part of the town's Canada Day festivities. The Charles W. Stockey Centre for the Performing Arts serves as the principal performance venue during the Festival of the Sound, and also hosts concerts, live theatre and other cultural events throughout the year.

== Recreation and sports ==
There are several provincial parks in the Parry Sound area, including Oastler Lake, The Massasauga and Killbear, as well as numerous provincial conservation reserves, including the Georgian Bay Biosphere Reserve, one of only 13 UNESCO sites in Canada. The eastern coast of Georgian Bay where Parry Sound is located is known as the "30,000 Islands" and is considered the world's largest freshwater archipelago. It covers 347,000 hectares of shoreline ecosystem, and over 100 species of animals and plants that are at risk in Canada and Ontario, including unique reptiles and amphibians. Parry Sound's Aspen Valley Wildlife Sanctuary cares for injured and orphaned animals, and offers an informational and interpretive centre for wildlife education. A 230-kilometre recreational trail, the Park-to-Park Trail, connects Killbear with Algonquin Provincial Park in two locations, to the south at Dwight, and farther north, east of Kearney.

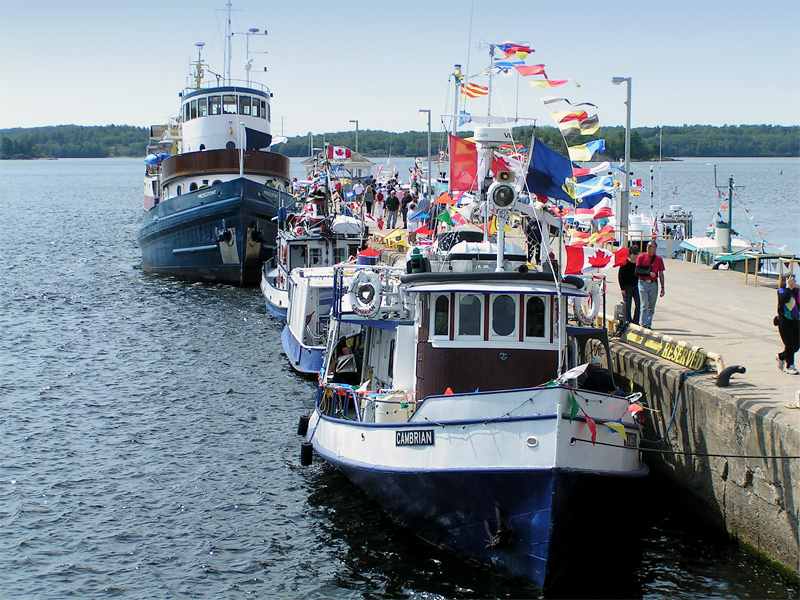
Departure point at the harbour, for the sightseeing tours of the 30,000 Islands

Parry Sound, and much of Central and Northern Ontario, are well known for their tourism businesses. Accommodation businesses range from hotels and full service resorts to lodges and camping grounds. Sightseeing tours of the 30,000 Islands are offered by Georgian Bay Airways, and the Island Queen and MV Chippawa cruise ships. kayak and canoe rentals and tours are available during the summer, as well as winter sporting gear rentals during the winter. The town is home to an annual ATV Jamboree, and guided ATV tours of the region's wilderness are available throughout the year. There are several golf courses located in and near Parry Sound; ice hockey, fishing, cross-country skiing, and softball are also popular recreational sports in the area. Cross-country skiing in the Parry Sound area is based out of Georgian Nordic Outdoor Activity Centre (GNOAC). Famous NHL player Bobby Orr played minor hockey for the Parry Sound Shamrocks. Another more recent professional hockey player who played for the Shamrocks is Aidan Dudas who plays for HC TPS of the Finnish SM-Liiga. Aidan was selected in the fourth round (113th overall) of the 2019 NHL Draft by the Los Angeles Kings. The town had a junior team also called the Shamrocks for a short period of time who reached the Northern Ontario Junior Hockey Association championship finals in 1998 and 1999 before the team folded in 2003.

== Transportation ==
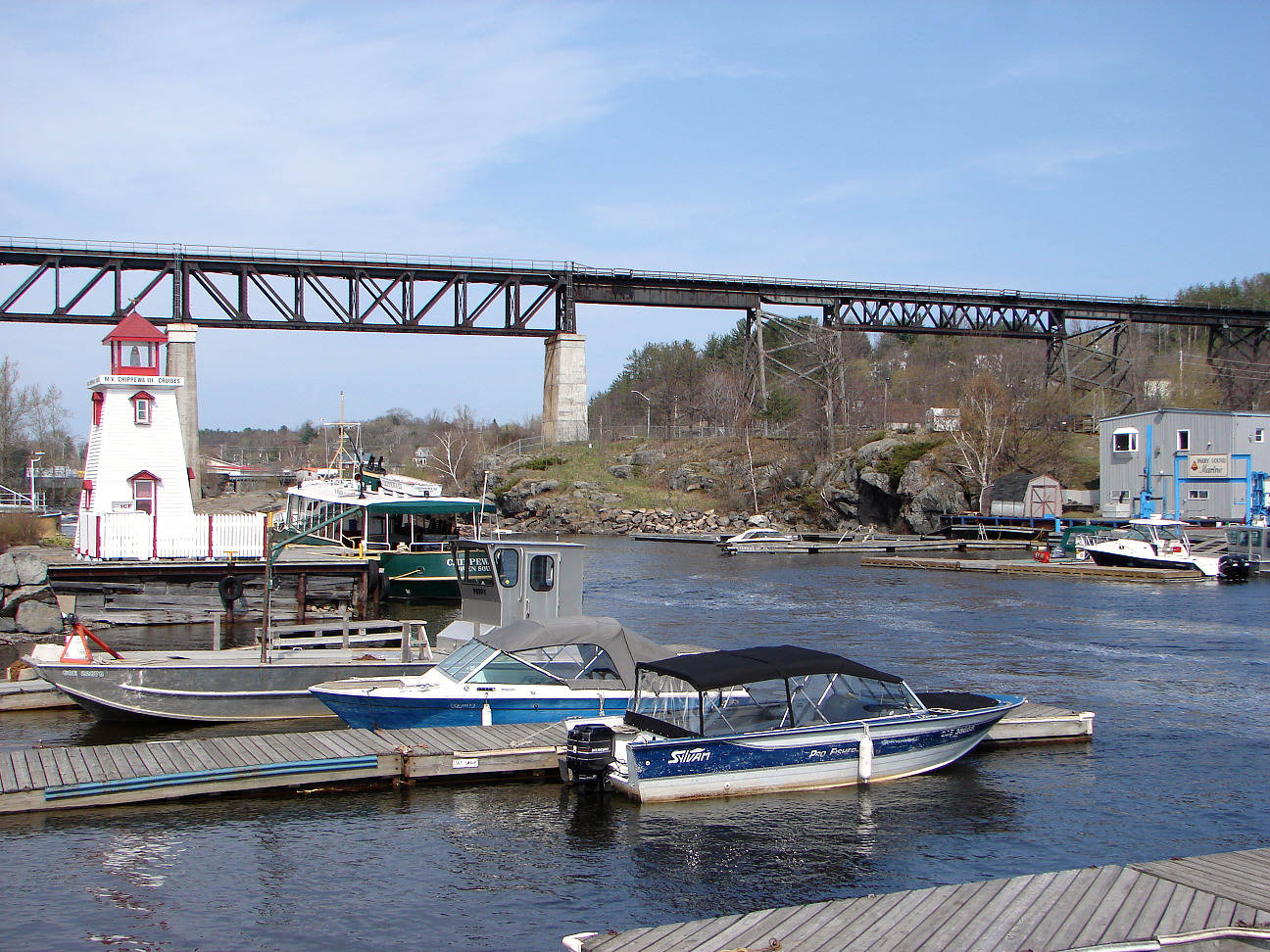
Harbour of Parry Sound

Parry Sound is located along a highway which currently bears the dual designation of Highway 69/Highway 400. From the opening of this freeway alignment in 2004 until October 26, 2010, a point one kilometre north of Parry Sound's Bowes Street/McDougall Road interchange was the terminus of Highway 400, but the freeway now begins 17 kilometres further north, at Highway 559 north of Nobel. The former alignment of Highway 69 from Parry Sound southerly to Holmur now has the street name Oastler Park Drive and serves as the main access road to Oastler Lake Provincial Park.

The western termini of Highway 124, which extends easterly to Sundridge, and Highway 518, which heads east to Kearney, are both located just outside Parry Sound's town limits.

Bus service from Toronto is available by Ontario Northland Motor Coach Services, the government-owned transportation company, and buses arrive daily en route to Sudbury. In addition, Via Rail's Canadian (Toronto – Vancouver) transcontinental passenger train serve Parry Sound railway stations twice a week both east- and westbound. Westbound passenger as well as Canadian Pacific Kansas City and Canadian National Railway freight trains are carried over the Seguin River by the Parry Sound CPR Trestle, a visible presence in the centre of town.

The town is served by the Parry Sound Area Municipal Airport and the Parry Sound Medical Heliport, as well as numerous small water aerodromes:

- Parry Sound Harbour Water Aerodrome (CPS1)
- Parry Sound/Deep Bay Water Aerodrome (CPT6)
- Parry Sound/Derbyshire Island Water Aerodrome (CDS6)
- Parry Sound/Frying Pan Island-Sans Souci Water Aerodrome (CPS9)
- Parry Sound/Huron Island Water Aerodrome (CPS8)
- Parry Sound/St. Waleran Island Water Aerodrome (CPD6)

The Big Sound Marina is a 120-serviced slip marina on Georgian Bay for transient vessels up to 60 feet (18 m).

== Canadian Coast Guard Parry Sound Base ==
Canadian Coast Guard has a base in Parry Sound at 28 Waubeek Street. The base has berthing and maintenance facilities for CCG vessels. CCGS Samuel Risley and CCGS Cove Isle are the current home ported vessels at the CCG base. There is an unregistered helipad at the base next to the Waubuno Beach boat launch and is the home base to two helicopters, a Bell 412 and a Bell 429.

The entrance to the station is a shack with lantern room from the historic Cape Robert Lighthouse formerly on Manitoulin Island.

== Media ==
=== Radio ===
Frequency	Call sign	Branding	Format	Owner	Notes
FM 89.9	CBLR-FM	CBC Radio One	Talk radio, public radio	Canadian Broadcasting Corporation	Rebroadcaster of CBLA-FM (Toronto)
FM 91.3	CHRZ-FM	Rez 91	First Nations community radio	Wasauksing Communications Group	Broadcasts in English and Ojibwe
FM 103.3	CKLP-FM	Moose FM	Adult hits	Vista Broadcast Group	

=== Radio notes ===
On April 30, 2026, Parry Sound Community Radio Association submitted an application to operate a new community FM radio station at Parry Sound on the frequency 97.9 MHz (channel 250B1) with an effective radiated power (ERP) of 7,750 watts (non-directional antenna with an effective height of antenna above average terrain [EHAAT] of 47.1 metres).

=== Television ===
OTA channel	Call sign	Network	Notes
7 (VHF)	CIII-DT-7	Global	Rebroadcaster of CIII-DT (Toronto)
12 (VHF)	CKVR-TV-1	CTV Two	Rebroadcaster of CKVR-DT (Barrie)
23 (UHF)	CHCH-DT-3	Independent	Rebroadcaster of CHCH-DT (Hamilton)

=== Newspapers ===
- North Star – The Parry Sound North Star

== Notable people ==
List of notable people associated with Parry Sound:

- Marty Adams, actor, writer and comedian
- Samuel Armstrong (1844–1921), businessman and politician
- James Arthurs (1866–1937), politician and senator
- Bill Beagan (born 1937), National Hockey League referee and commissioner of four hockey leagues
- William Rabb Beatty (1851–1905), businessman and politician
- Neil Belland (born 1961), professional ice hockey player
- Fred Bourdginon (1906–1995), professional ice hockey player
- John Brackenborough (1897–1993), professional ice hockey player
- Sully Burrows, country music singer and songwriter
- Gerald Carson (1903–1956), professional ice hockey player
- Wayne Clairmont (born 1943), professional ice hockey player
- Terry Crisp (born 1943), professional ice hockey player and coach
- Eleanor Joanne Daley (born 1955), composer and choir director
- Douglas Durkin (1884–1967), novelist, short story writer and screenwriter
- Ernie Eves (born 1946), lawyer, politician and 23rd Premier of Ontario
- Donald Guloien, business executive
- Mark Ideson (born 1976), Paralympic wheelchair curler
- Allan Loney (1885–1965), hockey player charged with manslaughter
- William Morgan (born 1975), Paralympic judoka
- Megan Oldham (born 2001), freestyle skier, Olympic gold medalist
- Bobby Orr (born 1948), professional ice hockey player and Hockey Hall of Fame inductee
- Francis Pegahmagabow (1891–1956) deadliest sniper in World War I
- Graham Ritchie (born 1998), Olympic and professional cross country skier
- Gary Sabourin (born 1943), professional ice hockey player
- James Sharpe (1846–1935), merchant and politician
- Fred J. Stevenson (1895–1928), aviator and bush pilot
- William Sutherland (1926/27–1998), politician

== See also ==
- List of towns in Ontario
- List of population centres in Ontario
