= Nipissing-North Arm Orienteering Trail =

Trail in Ontario, Canada

Coordinates: 45.226°N 80.056°W

- Length: 30 km (19 mi)
- Location: Ontario, Canada
- Trailheads: Devil's Elbow
- Use: Hiking, Orienteering
- Difficulty: very difficult
- Season: April to October
- Hazards: Massasauga rattlesnake

The Nipissing-North Arm Orienteering Trail, a 30-kilometre (19 mi) backpacking route, leads across rugged wilderness in the Massasauga Provincial Park, Ontario, Canada. The park is situated along Georgian Bay on Lake Huron and its trails are accessible only by water. The trail is not blazed, although there are posts with interpretive information located at points of interest along the route.
