= Seguin River =

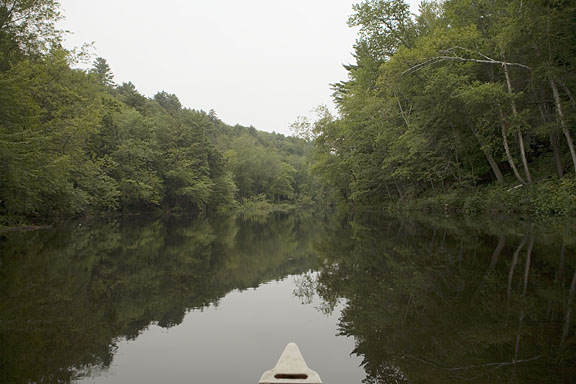
- Seguin River

- Location of the mouth of the Seguin River in Ontario
- Etymology: From the Ojibwe ziigwan, meaning "spring"

Location
- Country: Canada
- Province: Ontario
- Region: Central Ontario
- District: Parry Sound

Physical characteristics
- Source: Bear Lake
  - location: Bear Lake, McMurrich/Monteith
  - coordinates: 45°27′23″N 79°35′19″W
  - elevation: 314 m (1,030 ft)
- Mouth
  - location: Parry Sound
  - coordinates: 45°20′21″N 80°02′03″W
  - elevation: 176 m (577 ft)
- Length: 40 km (25 mi)
- Basin size: 1,023 km^{2} (395 sq mi)

Basin features
- Tributaries
  - left: Little Seguin River
  - right: Manitoubwabing River

The Seguin River is a river in Parry Sound District in central Ontario, Canada that empties into Parry Sound on Georgian Bay, Lake Huron at the town of Parry Sound. The river's name comes from the Ojibwe word ziigwan, meaning "spring".

== Course ==
The Seguin River begins at Horn Lake near the community of Bear Lake in the municipality of McMurrich/Monteith. It is joined by a tributary off of Bear lake, then turns southwest and enters the township of Seguin, flows through Upper Fry Lake and Lower Fry Lake and passes north over a series of waterfalls near the community of Seguin Falls, at which point it is crossed by the former path of the Ottawa, Arnprior and Parry Sound Railway, now the recreational Seguin Trail rail trail. The river turns again southwest into Isabella Lake where it takes in the left tributary Little Seguin River. It continues southwest over the Serpent Rapids, the Indian Rapids and the Hab Rapids, passes into the township of McDougall, and takes in the right tributary Manitouwabing River. The Seguin continues through Mountain Chute to reach Mill Lake in the town of Parry Sound, where it takes in the left tributary Haines Creek, heads under Ontario Highway 400 then over Mill Lake Dam, and takes in the right tributary Darlington's Creek. It then flows under a low bridge carrying the Canadian National Railway main line, over the Cascade Street Dam and Cascade Street Generating Station, over the Trestle Dam, under the high Parry Sound CPR Trestle that carries the Canadian Pacific Railway, and reaches its mouth at Parry Sound.

In addition to the already named towns, townships and municipalities in Parry Sound District, portions of the Seguin River drainage basin lie in the township McKellar, Parry Sound District, and less than 1% lies in the geographic township of Cardwell, part of the township of Muskoka Lakes in Muskoka District.

== History ==
A sawmill built at the mouth of the river in 1857 was one of the first industries in the area, and which later led to the founding of the town of Parry Sound. The river was also used to float down the logs cut in the forests upstream. Ice hockey legend Bobby Orr learned to skate on the frozen river.

== Natural history ==
The 275-hectare (680-acre) Seguin River Conservation Reserve is located on the river at the mouth of the Manitouwabing River. It protects upland forest, steep cliff and metavolcanic bedrock outcropping landscapes.

== Tributaries ==
- Darlington's Creek (right)
- Haines Creek (left)
- Manitoubwabing River (right)
- Little Seguin River (left)

== See also ==
- List of rivers of Ontario

== Sources ==
- Township of Seguin (JPG) (Map). L.U. Maughan Company Ltd. 2005.
