= Seguin Falls =

Coordinates: 45°24′56″N 79°40′05″W

Seguin Falls is a ghost town and unincorporated place on the Nipissing Colonization Road in the township of Seguin, Parry Sound District in northeastern Ontario, Canada.

== History ==
The portion of the Nipissing Road at Seguin Falls was opened to winter traffic by 1873 and passable to wheeled vehicles by 1875, and became the main route of travel between Lake Rosseau and Lake Nipissing and points in between. The Nipissing Road lost its importance following the completion of the railway between Gravenhurst and Callander in 1886, and most of this section of the colonization road fell into a state of disrepair. The village of Magnetawan was, by this time, more easily accessed from Burk's Falls.

It was not until a decade later that Seguin Falls developed as a village. During construction of the Ottawa, Arnprior and Parry Sound Railway, completed in 1896, a station was established where the line crossed the Nipissing Road. The importance of that portion of the former colonization road was restored as an access point from Seguin Falls to Magnetawan and remains as an active route for automobile traffic, to this day.

Lumbering was likely carried on near Seguin Falls during the pre railway era with the construction of dams to regulate water levels, timber was driven down the Seguin River more than 35 years before the building of the Ottawa, Arnprior & Parry Sound Railway. Timber usually became easier to access with the construction of a railway and it is possible that some uncut sawlogs were carried away by the trains to be processed elsewhere. The last sawmill at Seguin Falls during the railway era was John Campbell & Sons', wound up during the summer of 1926. At that time J. D. Campbell was busy putting up a new mill on the CNR 56 miles (90 km) west of Capreol.

The King George Hotel, located about 100 yards from the railway station, was owned and operated by Thomas and Mary Jane McKinnon until 1957. In 1952 the rate for one of the six rooms (without bath) was $3.00 US. The King George was converted to a private home which subsequently burned down in 1989. The stone foundation, hearth and chimney still remain.

The OA&PS Railway through Seguin Falls, locally known as the Grand Trunk was taken over by the Grand Trunk Railway in 1904, which was subsequently absorbed by Canadian National Railways in 1923. That portion of the line between Falding and Scotia was abandoned in 1955. The old railway bed, now the Seguin Trail, is also part of the Trans Canada Trail.
