= Seguin, Ontario =

Seguin
- Township (single-tier)
- Township of Seguin
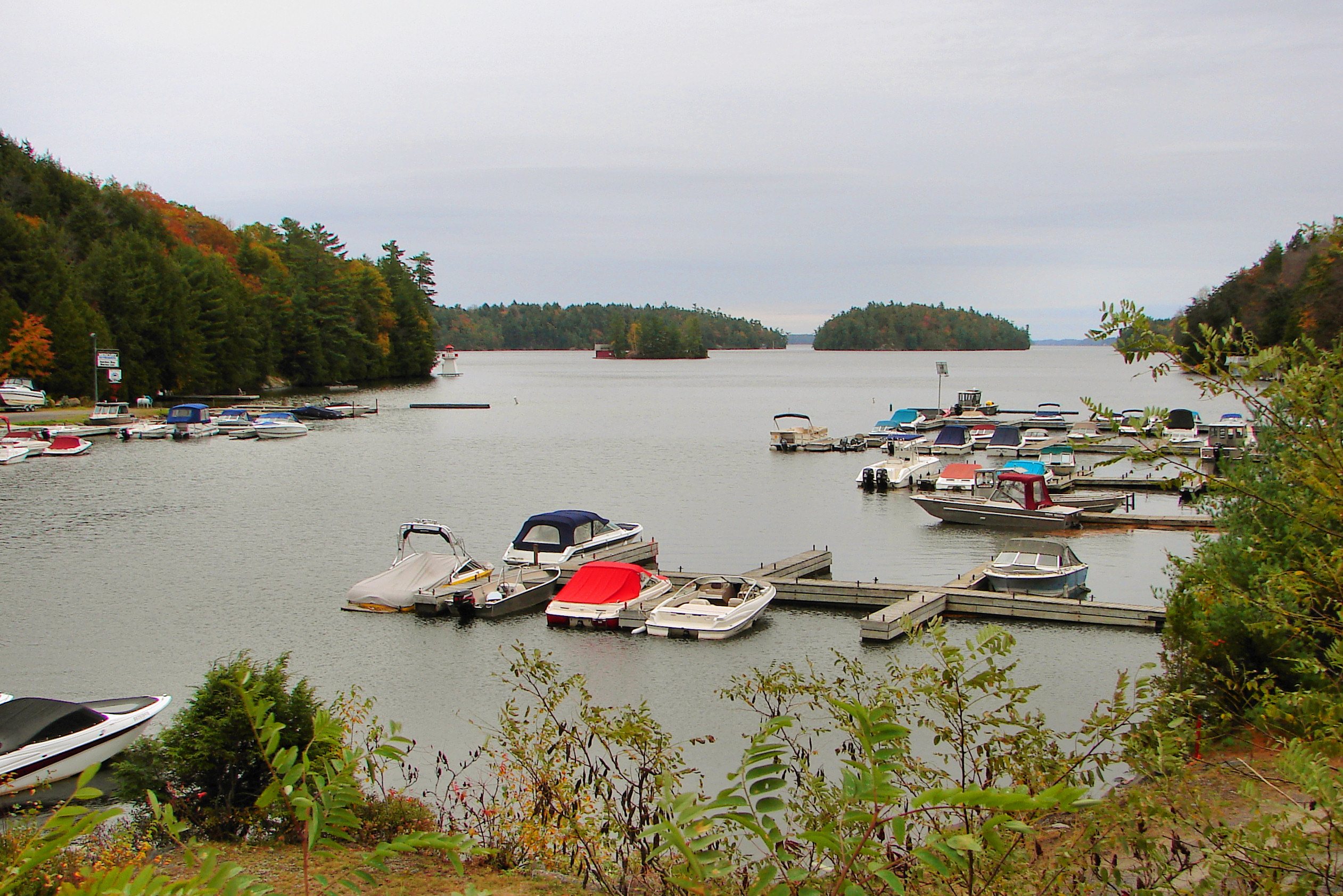
- Gordon Bay on Lake Joseph

- Location within Southern Ontario
- Coordinates: 45.288203°N 79.811561°W
- Country: Canada
- Province: Ontario
- District: Parry Sound
- Incorporated: January 1, 1998

Government
  - Type: Township
  - Mayor: Ann MacDiarmid
  - Fed. riding: Parry Sound-Muskoka
  - Prov. riding: Parry Sound—Muskoka

Area
  - Land: 586.99 km^{2} (226.64 sq mi)

Population (2021)
  - Total: 5,280
  - Density: 9/km^{2} (23/sq mi)
- Time zone: UTC-5 (EST)
  - Summer (DST): UTC-4 (EDT)
- Area codes: 705, 249
- Website: www.seguin.ca

Seguin is a township in central Ontario, Canada, in Parry Sound District.

== History ==
The Township of Seguin was created by Minister's Order, dated May 8, 1997. Pursuant to this Order, the Township of Seguin became a newly incorporated municipality, effective January 1, 1998, through the merger of the former Townships of Christie, Foley and Humphrey, and the Village of Rosseau as well as an annexation of the western portion of the unorganized Township of Monteith.

== Geography ==
The Township of Seguin is the most southerly municipality in the District of Parry Sound. It is also the first municipality in Northern Ontario along the Highways 69 and 400 corridor. The administrative offices of the township are located in Humphrey.

The township includes the communities of:

- Black Road
- Brignall
- Dockmure
- Dock Siding
- Falding
- Gordon Bay
- Haines Lake
- Hamer Bay
- Hayes Corners
- Holmur
- Horseshoe Lake
- Humphrey
- Lake Joseph
- Orrville
- Otter Lake
- Port Cockburn
- Rose Point
- Rosseau
- Rosseau Road
- Seguin Falls
- South Parry
- Stanley House
- Swords
- Turtle Lake

== Demographics ==
In the 2021 Census of Population conducted by Statistics Canada, Seguin had a population of 5,280 living in 2,136 of 4,827 total private dwellings, a change of 22.7% from its 2016 population of 4,304. With a land area of 586.99 km^{2} (226.64 sq mi), it had a population density of 9.0/km^{2} (23.3/sq mi) in 2021.

Canada census – Seguin, Ontario community profile

	2021	2016	2011
Population	5,280 (+22.7% from 2016)	4,304 (+7.9% from 2011)	3,988 (-6.7% from 2006)
Land area	586.99 km^{2} (226.64 sq mi)	595.68 km^{2} (229.99 sq mi)	595.42 km^{2} (229.89 sq mi)
Population density	9.0/km^{2} (23/sq mi)	7.2/km^{2} (19/sq mi)	6.7/km^{2} (17/sq mi)
Median age	54.8 (M: 54.4, F: 55.6)	53.0 (M: 52.6, F: 53.4)
Private dwellings	4,827 (total) 2,136 (occupied)	4,744 (total)	4,348 (total)
Median household income	$84,000	$71,296

References: 2021 2016 2011

Historical census populations – Seguin, Ontario
Year	Pop.	±%
1996	3,654	—
2001	3,698	+1.2%
2006	4,276	+15.6%
2011	3,988	−6.7%
2016	4,304	+7.9%
2021	5,280	+22.7%
Source: Statistics Canada

== See also ==
- Camp Ekon
- List of townships in Ontario
