= South River (Ontario) =

- Etymology: From South Bay on Lake Nipissing
- Native name: Nanamitagong

Location
- Country: Canada
- Province: Ontario
- Region: Almaguin Highlands
- District: Parry Sound

Physical characteristics
- Source: Wetlands north of Togo Lake
  - location: Paxton Township, Algonquin Provincial Park, Nipissing District, Central Ontario, Ontario, Canada
  - coordinates: 45°48′01″N 79°02′29″W
  - elevation: 465 m (1,526 ft)
- Mouth: South Bay, Lake Nipissing
  - location: Nipissing, Almaguin Highlands, Parry Sound District, Central Ontario, Ontario, Canada
  - coordinates: 46°07′34″N 79°34′22″W
  - elevation: 196 m (643 ft)
- Length: 135 km (84 mi)

The South is a river in the Almaguin Highlands region of Parry Sound District, Ontario, beginning in the Western Uplands of Algonquin Provincial Park and emptying into Lake Nipissing. The river takes its name from an arm of Lake Nipissing into which it flows, South Bay.

== Geography ==
Situated in the northwestern quadrant of the Algonquin Dome (of which the Almaguin Highlands form the western edge) the headwaters of the South are located in wetlands north of Togo Lake at an elevation of 465 m. The river heads in a northwesterly direction, meandering through the Almaguin Highlands before emptying into Lake Nipissing at 195m, descending some 270m along its course.

== Tributaries ==
The South has a number of smaller tributaries, chief among them are, Paul, Beatty, Genesee, McGillvray, Black (Gurd), Trout, Bray, Black (Machar), Smyth, and Craig.

== Communities ==
An estimated 4750 people live along the South, the river itself giving rise to many villages in the Highlands, including Nipissing, Powassan, Trout Creek, and the eponymous South River. These communities were built around the rapids and waterfalls along the river, harnessing the energy and force of the cascading water to power sawmills in the 19th century. Logging was the chief industry in the region, attracting many pioneers, settlers, immigrants, and lumber barons, all seeking a livelihood from the vast resources of timber that abounded in the river’s watershed. The South flows through the following townships: (from upstream to downstream) Paxton (unorganized Nipissing District), Joly, Laurier, Machar, Gurd, Powassan (South Himsworth), and Nipissing.

== Hydroelectricity ==
There are numerous control and electricity producing dams located on the South, making use of the rapids and waterfalls much the same way the early sawmills did. Ownership of the dams is a mix of private companies and government corporations.

== Tourism ==
The South has always been a popular canoe route, with arguably the most famous person to paddle its waters and take inspiration from it, being the early 20th century artist Tom Thomson. In the Village of South River on the shores of the waterway is located the Tom Thomson Park, the site in which Thomson would pull his canoe from the river and board the train bound for his studio and clients in Southern Ontario. The Municipality of Powassan organizes a canoe race every summer along the portion of the river within its boundaries. There are numerous wilderness outfitters and tourist camps interspersed with private cottages and homes dotting the shores of the South.

== See also ==
- List of rivers of Ontario
