= 2014 Parry Sound District municipal elections =

Elections were held in the organized municipalities in the Parry Sound District of Ontario on October 27, 2014 in conjunction with municipal elections across the province.

== The Archipelago ==
Reeve Candidate	Vote	%
Peter Ketchum (X)	Acclaimed	

== Armour ==
Reeve Candidate	Vote	%
Bob MacPhail (X)	Acclaimed	

== Burk's Falls ==
Reeve Candidate	Vote	%
Cathy Still (X)	218	76.49
Rocco Mortelliti	67	23.51

== Callander ==
Mayoral Candidate	Vote	%
Hector Lavigne (X)	Acclaimed	

== Carling ==
Mayoral Candidate	Vote	%
Mike Konoval	Acclaimed	

== Joly ==
Mayoral Candidate	Vote	%
Bruce Baker	165	52.55
Robin Anderson	77	24.52
Mario Campese (X)	72	22.93

== Kearney ==
Mayoral Candidate	Vote	%
Lance Thrale	647	56.75
Arthur Murdy	349	30.61
John Canning	144	12.63

== Machar ==
Mayoral Candidate	Vote	%
Lynda Carleton	657	78.49
Edward Murphy	180	21.51

== Magnetawan ==
Mayoral Candidate	Vote	%
Sam Dunnett (X)	Acclaimed	

== McDougall ==
Mayoral Candidate	Vote	%
Dale Robinson (X)	1,189	88.80
Roger Taylor	150	11.20

== McKellar ==
Reeve Candidate	Vote	%
Peter Hopkins (X)	731	49.19
David Moore	487	32.77
Ken Galloway	268	18.03

== McMurrich/Monteith ==
Reeve Candidate	Vote	%
Joanne Griffiths	305	45.86
Lynn Zemnicky	240	26.09
David Stewart	103	15.49
Cherie Appleyard	17	2.56

== Nipissing ==
Mayoral Candidate	Vote	%
Pat Haufe (X)	Acclaimed	

== Parry Sound ==
Mayoral Candidate	Vote	%
Jamie McGarvey (X)	1,636	68.02
Ted Knight	769	31.98

== Perry ==
Mayoral Candidate	Vote	%
Norm Hofstetter	639	67.55
John Dunn (X)	307	32.45

== Powassan ==
Mayoral Candidate	Vote	%
Peter McIsaac (X)	789	53.17
Petter Brushey	493	33.22
Todd White	202	13.61

== Ryerson ==
Reeve Candidate	Vote	%
Glenn Miller (X)	364	64.65
Paul Fink	199	35.35

== Seguin ==
Mayoral Candidate	Vote	%
Bruce Gibbon	3,021	83.45
Mike Phillips	403	11.13
Ron Steele	196	5.41

== South River ==
Mayoral Candidate	Vote	%
Jim Coleman (X)	201	51.41
Robert Barker	190	48.59

== Strong ==
Mayoral Candidate	Vote	%
Christine Ellis (X)	389	56.79
Stephen Rawn	296	43.21

== Sundridge ==
Mayoral Candidate	Vote	%
Lyle Hall	374	69.91
Jim Newman	151	28.22
Arthur Jefford	10	1.87

== Whitestone ==
Mayoral Candidate	Vote	%
Chris Armstrong (X)	751	51.12
Alan Ladd	718	48.88
