= 2010 Parry Sound District municipal elections =

Elections were held in the organized municipalities in the Parry Sound District of Ontario on October 25, 2010 in conjunction with municipal elections across the province.

== The Archipelago ==
The Archipelago was one of a number of municipalities in the region whose mayors won by acclamation.

Reeve Candidate	Vote	%
Peter Ketchum (X)	Acclaimed	

== Armour ==
Armour was one of a number of municipalities in the region whose mayors won by acclamation. Rod Blakelock, Marty Corcoran, Jerry Brandt and Patrick Hayes were elected to council.

Reeve Candidate	Vote	%
Bob MacPhail (X)	Acclaimed	

== Burk's Falls ==
Burk's Falls was one of a number of municipalities in the region whose mayors won by acclamation. Bruce Campbell, Rex Smith, Lisa Morrison and Lewis Hodgson will serve on council.

Reeve Candidate	Vote	%
Cathy Still (X)	Acclaimed	

== Callander ==
Callander's entire council was acclaimed into office. Doug Brydges, Virginia Onley, Robb Noon and Maurice Turgeon will serve on council.

Mayoral Candidate	Vote	%
Hector Lavigne (X)	Acclaimed	

== Carling ==
Carling was one of a number of municipalities in the region whose mayors won by acclamation. Mike Konoval, Susan Murphy, Sid Larson and Michael Gordon were elected to council.

Mayoral Candidate	Vote	%
Gord Harrison	Acclaimed	

== Joly ==
Joly was one of a number of municipalities in the region whose mayors won by acclamation. Betty Barnes, Tom Rheubottom, Bruce Baker and Marion Duke were elected to council.

Mayoral Candidate	Vote	%
Mario Campese (X)	Acclaimed	

== Kearney ==
Paul Tomlinson won the mayoral race in Kearney, a victory which local media credited to unusually high turnout among seasonal cottage country residents after the town attempted to eliminate its mail-in voting process. Louise Wadsworth, Arthur Murdy, Ken Ball, Steve Sainsbury, Barry Dingwall and Yvonne Wills were elected as councillors.

Mayoral Candidate	Vote	%
Paul Tomlinson	381	40.75
Lance Thrale	329	35.19
Charles Zummach	202	21.60
Frank Heran	23	2.46

== Machar ==
Doug Maeck won the mayoralty of Machar. Ron McLaren, Ronald Bennison, Lynn Mantha and Bill Russell were elected to council.

Mayoral Candidate	Vote	%
Douglas Maeck	504	59.09
Lynda Carleton	349	40.91

== Magnetawan ==
Former mayor Sam Dunnett defeated incumbent mayor Dick Smith in Magnetawan. Charlie Gray, Jack Crossman, Barry Mutton and Bryan Hampson were elected to council.

Mayoral Candidate	Vote	%
Sam Dunnett	860	49.17
Dick Smith (X)	521	29.79
Tony Pratas	368	21.04

== McDougall ==
McDougall was one of a number of municipalities in the region whose mayors won by acclamation. Kim Dixon, Lewis Malott, Peter Daleman and Joe Johnson were elected to council.

Mayoral Candidate	Vote	%
Dale Robinson (X)	Acclaimed	

== McKellar ==
Peter Hopkins was elected reeve of McKellar, defeating incumbent David Moore and challenger Debbie Zulak. Tamara Black, Ted Stroud, Jury Naklowych and Gerald Bell were elected to council.

Reeve Candidate	Vote	%
Peter Hopkins	619	46.30
David Moore (X)	383	28.65
Debbie Zulak	335	25.05

== McMurrich/Monteith ==
McMurrich/Monteith was one of a number of municipalities in the region whose mayors won by acclamation. Tina Scott, Merv Mulligan, Lynn Zemnicky and Carol Armstrong were elected to council.

Reeve Candidate	Vote	%
Glynn Robinson (X)	Acclaimed	

== Nipissing ==
Pat Haufe won the mayoralty of Nipissing. Tom Piper, Liz Smith, Thomas H. Butler and Dougal Culham were elected to council.

Mayoral Candidate	Vote	%
Pat Haufe	456	44.70
Kalvin Young	390	38.23
Linda Anderson	174	17.06

== Parry Sound ==
Councillor Jamie McGarvey won the mayoral election in Parry Sound over challenger Perry Harris. Paul Borneman, Bonnie Keith, Brad Horne, Keith Saulnier, Dave Williams and Dan McCauley were elected to council.

Mayoral Candidate	Vote	%
Jamie McGarvey	1,419	56.71
Perry Harris	1,083	43.29

== Perry ==
Perry was one of a number of municipalities in the region whose mayors won by acclamation. Mary Anne Love, Jim Cushman, Les Rowley and Norm Hofstetter were elected to council.

Mayoral Candidate	Vote	%
John Dunn	Acclaimed	

== Powassan ==
Peter McIsaac won 67 per cent of the mayoral vote in Powassan, defeating incumbent mayor Bob Young. Todd White, Gerry Giesler, Nancy Barner, Dave Britton, Roger Glabb and Steven Eide were elected to council.

Mayoral Candidate	Vote	%
Peter McIsaac	1,012	67.06
Bob Young (X)	427	28.30
Leonard Kerrigan	70	4.64

== Ryerson ==
Incumbent reeve Glenn Miller was re-elected in Ryerson. Council will consist of Barbara Marlow, George Sterling, Rosalind Hall and Doug Weddell.

Reeve Candidate	Vote	%
Glenn Miller (X)	400	64.83
Paul C. Van Dam	217	35.17

== Seguin ==
Incumbent mayor David Conn was re-elected in Seguin. Alex Chidley, Bruce Gibbon, Rod Osborne, Doug Sainsbury, Everett Jacklin and Jack Hepworth were elected to council.

Mayoral Candidate	Vote	%
David Conn (X)	2,708	58.74
Mark Stivrins	1,902	41.26

== South River ==
Incumbent mayor Jim Coleman was reelected in South River. Bill O'Hallarn, Sharon Smith, Les Mahon and Jeff Dickerson were elected to council.

Mayoral Candidate	Vote	%
Jim Coleman (X)	247	69.38
Bob Barker	109	30.62

== Strong ==
Christine Ellis defeated incumbent mayor Stephen Rawn to become the first female mayor of Strong. Jason Cottrell, Kelly Elik, John Newstead and Merlyn Snow were elected to council.

Mayoral Candidate	Vote	%
Christine Ellis	329	52.22
Stephen Rawn (X)	301	47.78

== Sundridge ==
Incumbent mayor Elgin Schneider was re-elected in Sundridge. Bill de Vries, Christopher Blueman, Lawrie Vincer and Barry Morris were elected to council.

Mayoral Candidate	Vote	%
Elgin Schneider (X)	420	86.07
Arthur L. Jefford	68	13.93

== Whitestone ==
Incumbent mayor Chris Armstrong was re-elected in Whitestone. Don Carter, Bill Church, Colette Deacon and Joe Lamb were elected to council.

Mayoral Candidate	Vote	%
Chris Armstrong (X)	944	61.18
Alan Ladd	447	28.97
Caroline Ferry	152	9.85
