= Long Lake (McCraney Township) =

Lake in Nipissing District, Ontario, Canada

- Location within Ontario
- Location: Central Ontario
- Coordinates: 45°36′43″N 79°00′33″W
- Primary outflows: Round Lake
- Basin countries: Canada
- Surface elevation: ~475 m (1,558 ft)

Long Lake is a lake in McCraney geographical township in the municipality of Kearney in the Almaguin Highlands region of Central Ontario, Canada.

The lake is located in the part of Kearney located within the territorial district of Nipissing, but is however politically located in Parry Sound District. Geographically, Kearney spans both districts, but politically Kearney is located just in Parry Sound.

The lake is about 1 km long and varies in width from about 300 m in the north to no more than 50 m in the south.

The lake is fed by one unnamed creek, and drained by an unnamed creek in its south end which leads to Round Lake.

The nearest community is Ravensworth, 10 km to the west.

== See also ==
- List of lakes in Ontario
