= Almaguin Highlands =

- Inter-region
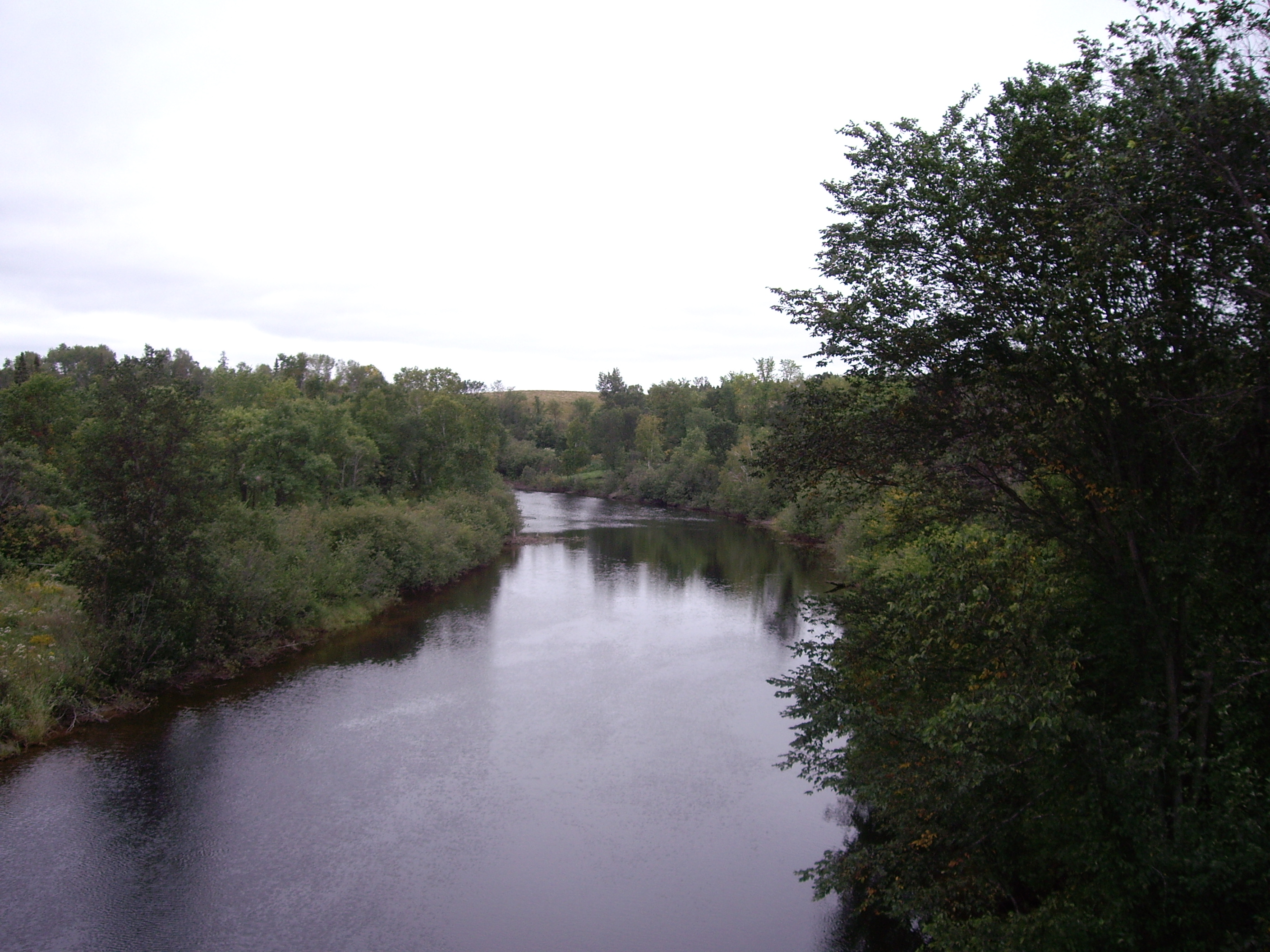
- Magnetawan River looking downstream from the Highway 11 bridge in Burk's Falls
- Nicknames: Almaguin; the Highlands
- Location within Ontario
- Coordinates: 45°48′N 079°36′W
- Country: Canada
- Province: Ontario
- Region: Central Ontario
- District: Parry Sound

Government
  - MPs: Scott Aitchison, Anthony Rota
  - MPPs: Graydon Smith, Vic Fedeli

Area
  - Total: 5,236.58 km^{2} (2,021.85 sq mi)

Population (2016)
  - Total: 23,929
  - Density: 4.5696/km^{2} (11.835/sq mi)
- Time zone: UTC-5 (EST)
  - Summer (DST): UTC-4 (EDT)
- Postal code FSA: P0A, P0H
- Area code: 705

The Almaguin Highlands Region (colloquially known as Almaguin, also referred to as 'the Highlands') in Ontario, Canada, covers approximately 5,200 km^{2} (2,000 sq mi) comprising the eastern half of Parry Sound District. It is bounded by Muskoka in the south, and by Lake Nipissing and Nipissing District in the north. The eastern edge abuts the western boundary of Algonquin Provincial Park, whereas the western boundary of the Almaguin Highlands is generally regarded to be the mid east-west point of Parry Sound District. Originally derived from the words Algonquin, Magnetawan, and Seguin. the name Almaguin is now used to describe the marketing region of East Parry Sound.

== Subdivisions ==
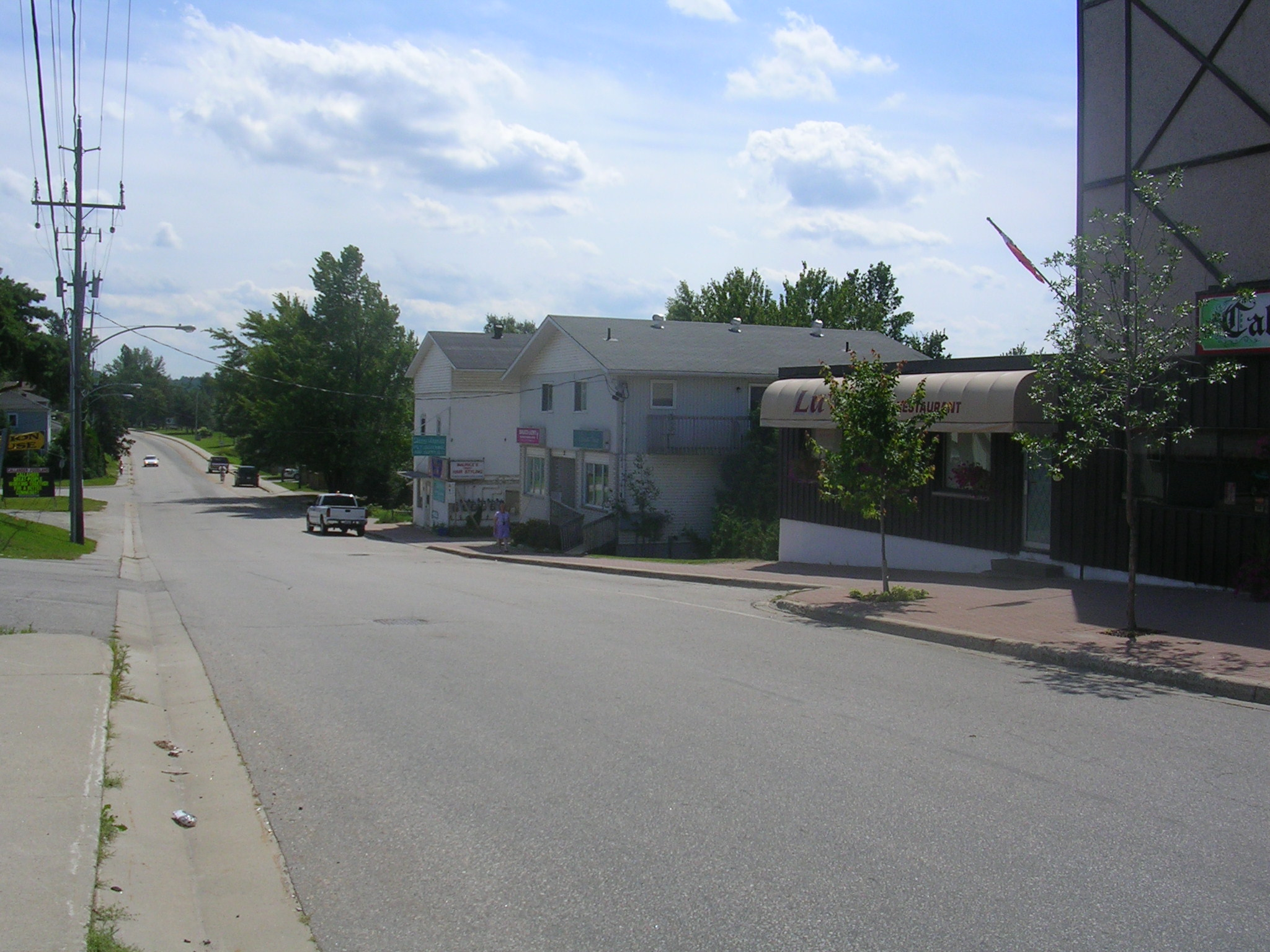
Callander, Ontario

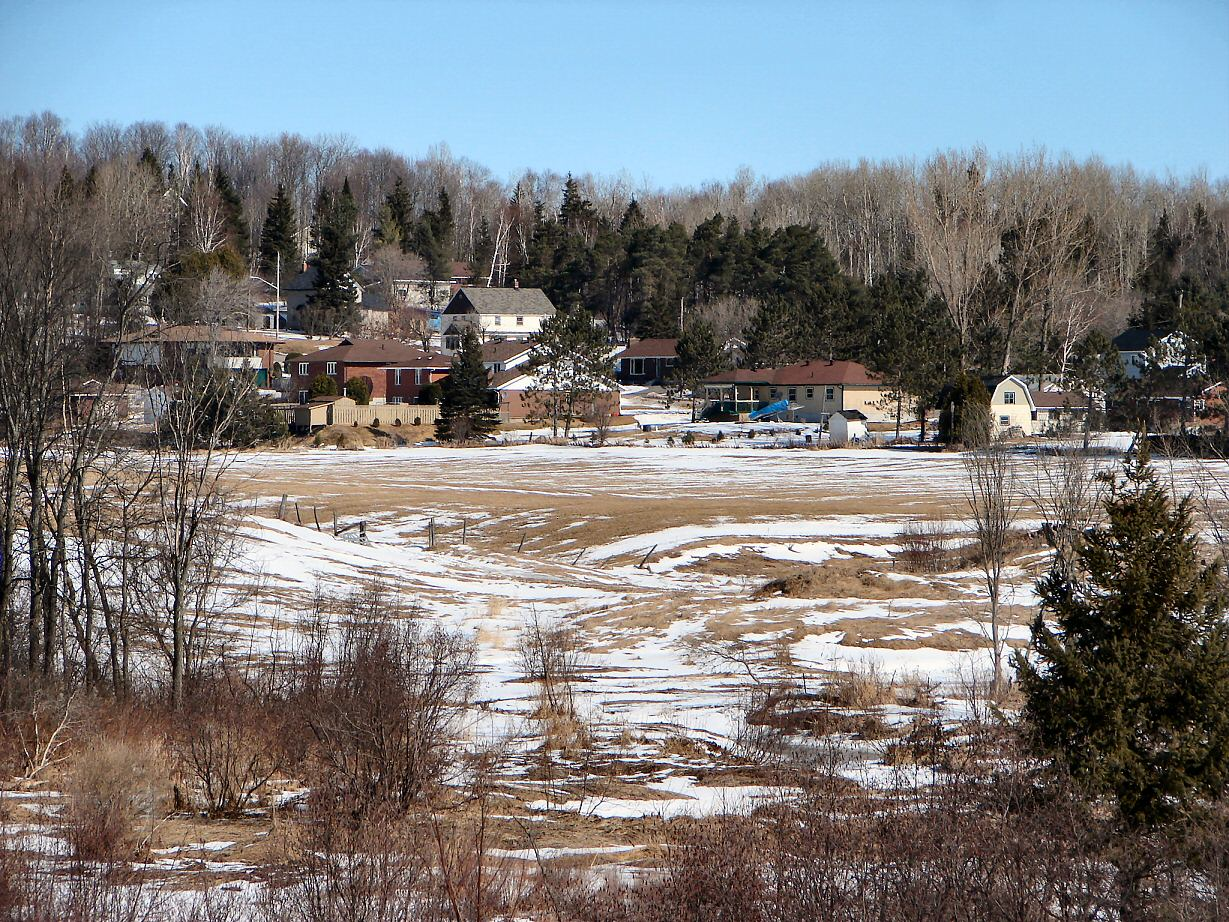
Powassan

The region includes fifteen incorporated municipalities, three local service boards (LSB) across eight unincorporated geographic townships, and one unincorporated geographic township without a local services board, which can be grouped into three subregions.

=== North Almaguin ===
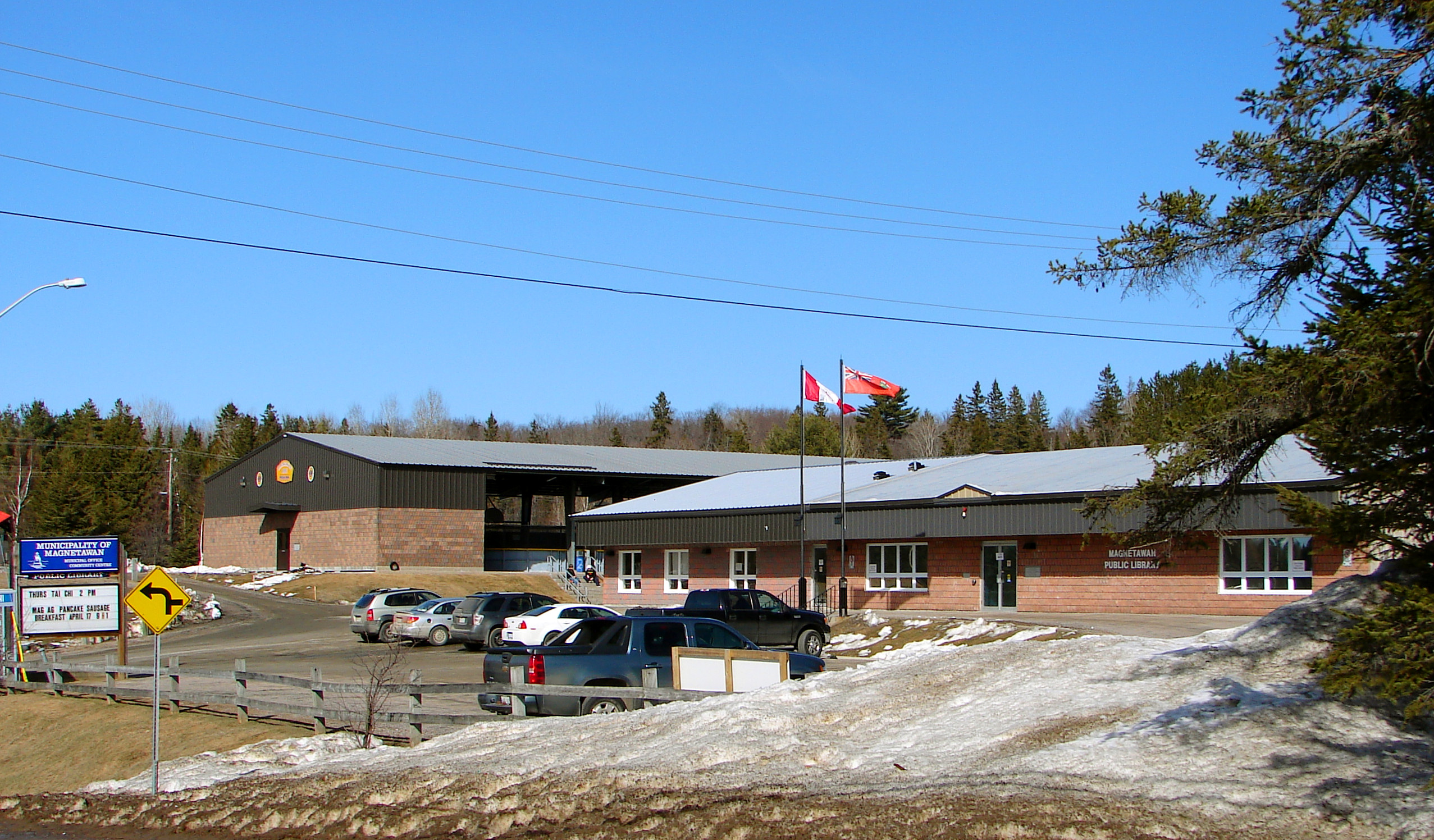
Municipal office and library of Magnetawan

- Municipality of Callander
- Township of Nipissing
- Town of Powassan
- Local Services Board of Loring, Port Loring and District
- Local Services Board of Restoule
- Township of Pringle, served by the LSB of both Loring and Restoule
- Township of Patterson

=== Central Almaguin ===
- Township of Joly
- Township of Machar
- Municipality of Magnetawan
- Village of South River
- Township of Strong
- Village of Sundridge
- Local Services Board of Laurier, Ontario
- Unincorporated Geographic Township of Lount

=== South Almaguin ===
- Township of Armour
- Village of Burk's Falls
- Town of Kearney
- Township of McMurrich/Monteith
- Township of Perry
- Township of Ryerson

=== Outlying areas ===
- While Almaguin is generally regarded to encompass the eastern half of Parry Sound District, by extension it includes the western portions of Butt and McCraney townships (annexed by the Town of Kearney in 1980), as well as the western portions of the unorganized townships of Ballantyne and Paxton, which lie outside of Algonquin Park and all of which are found in the Nipissing District.
- Chisholm Township in the Nipissing District as well, is in some respects included in North Almaguin.
- Municipality of Whitestone is mainly regarded as lying in West Parry Sound, however, its eastern reaches are commonly associated with Central Almaguin, chiefly Dunchurch, Maple Island, and Ferrie Township.

== Demographics ==
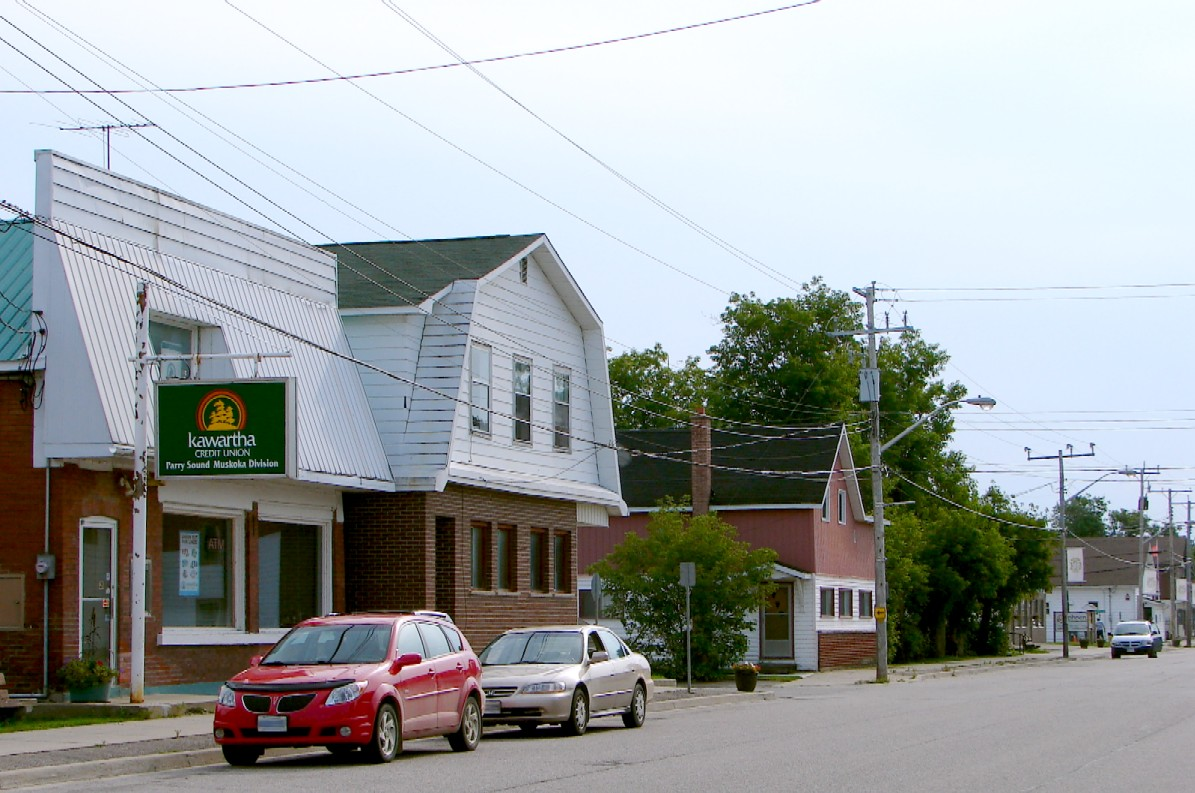
South River

According to the Canada 2016 Census, there are 23,929 residents living in the Almaguin Highlands, accounting for approximately 56% of the population of the District of Parry Sound (population 42,824 in 2016). By comparison, the Almaguin Highlands has a larger population than that of Haliburton County (population 18,062 in 2016) by over 5,800 residents, and encompasses an area of approximately the same size.

== Geography ==
The Almaguin Highlands are the westerly extension of the Algonquin Highlands of Central Ontario and form part of the Canadian Shield geological formation. Almaguin is situated in the Eastern forest-boreal transition ecoregion, which is predominately mixed woodlands, while the topography is hilly and dotted with crags, and interspersed with hundreds of lakes and rivers.

=== Lakes ===
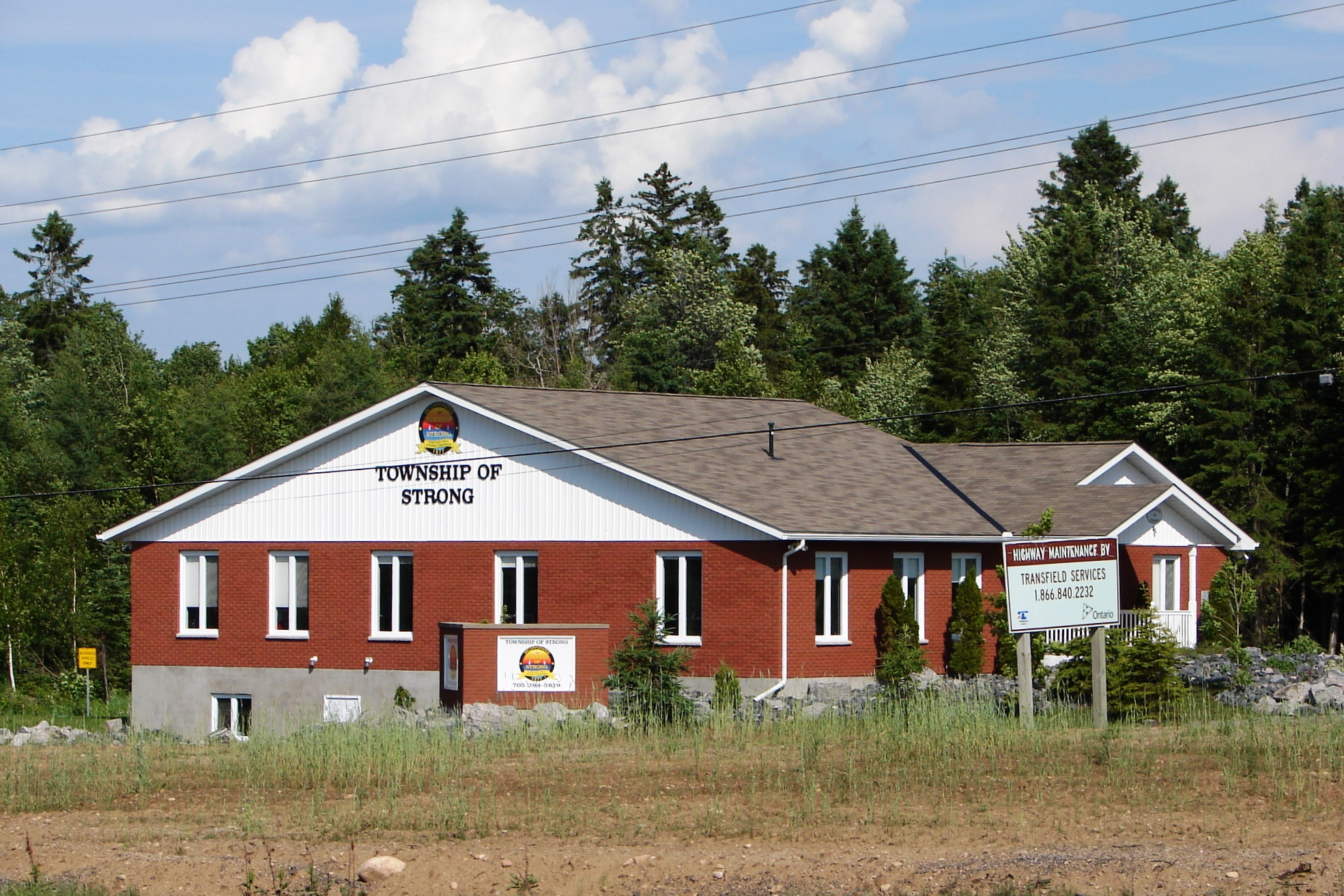
Municipal office of Strong Township

==== Armour ====
- Brock, Doe, Deer, Jack, Kelsey, Larson, Pickerel, Pike, Three Mile

==== Ballantyne ====
- Corkery, Hinsburger, Kawawaymog (Round), Loxton, North Tea, Pipe, Tyne

==== Callander ====
- Callander Bay (Lake Nipissing)

==== Joly ====
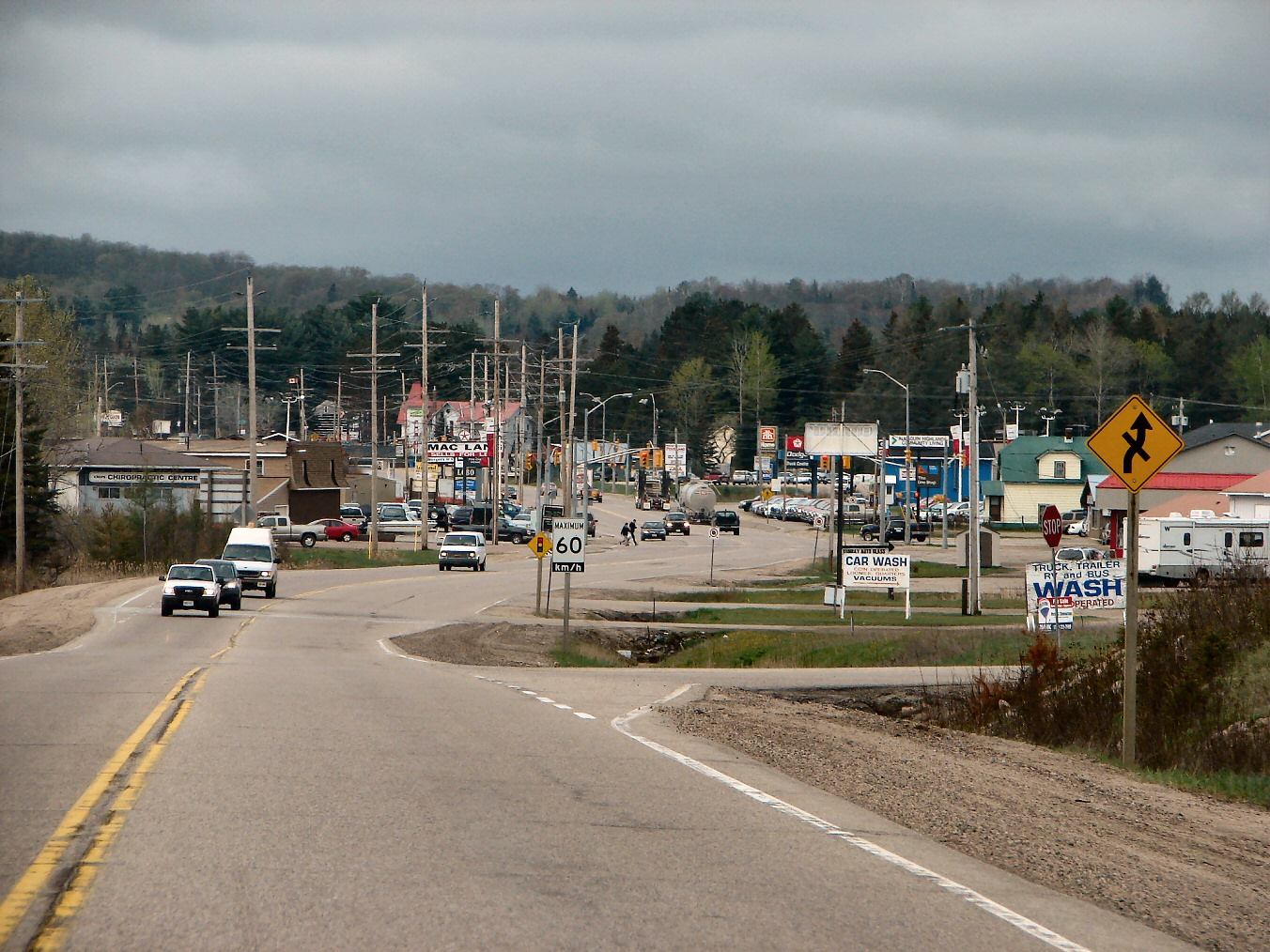
Sundridge

- Bluesky, Deadhorse, Forest, Long, Lynch, Otter, Peyton, Starvation, Twin Lakes, Widgeon

==== Kearney ====
- Beaver, Bridge, Buck, Clam, Cripple, Dewfish, Fifteen, Foote, Fox, Graphite, Grass, Groom, Hart, Island, Little Patterson, Long, Loon, Middle Shanty, North, Perry, Peters, Rock, Sand, Snowshoe, Thirty, Widgeon, Willie

==== Laurier ====
- Bacon, Forest, Louck, Sausage, Smyth (Surprise), Twentyseven

==== Loring, Port Loring, and District ====
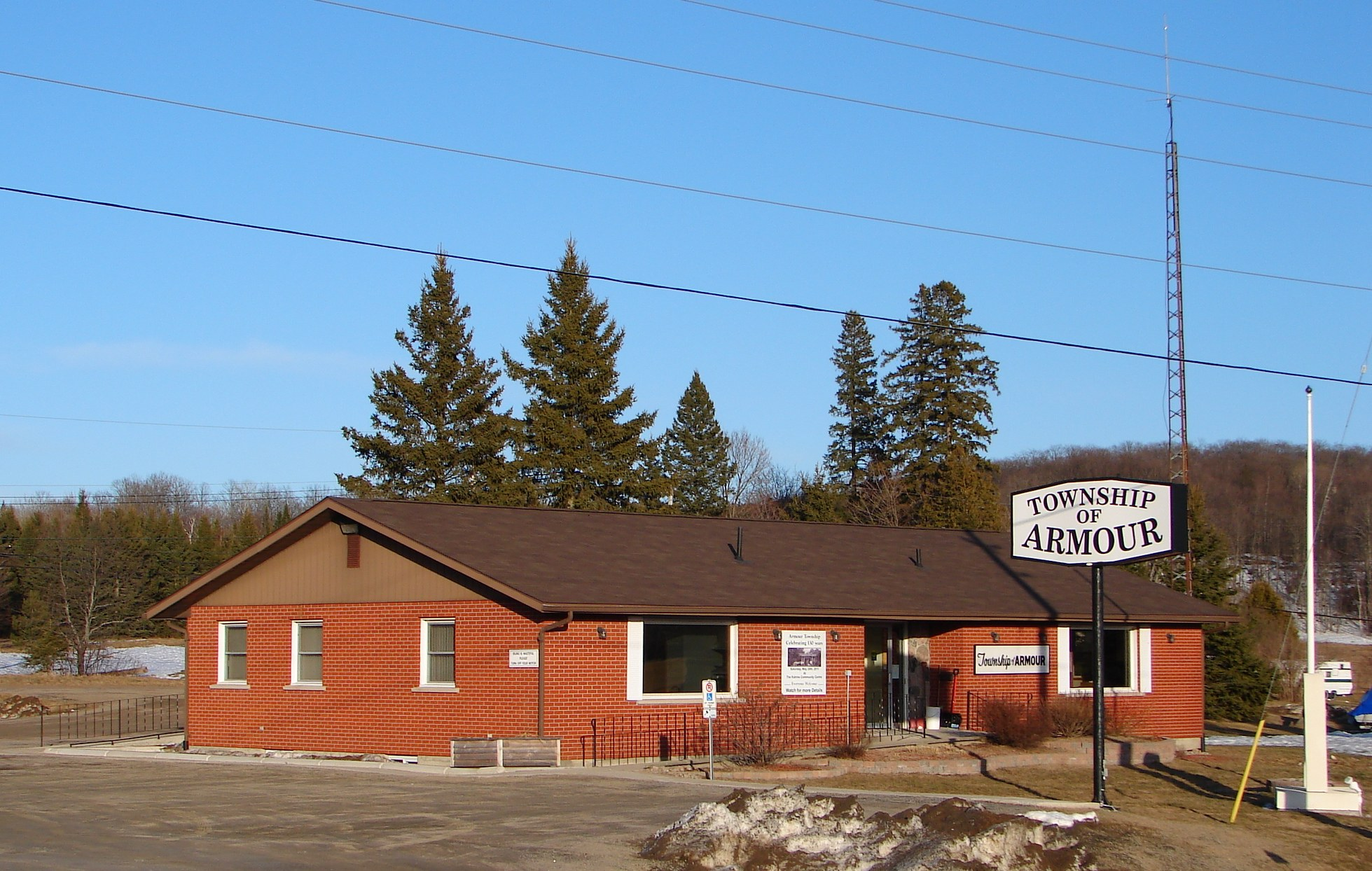
Municipal office of Armour Township

- Bain, Balsam, Big Caribou, Big Hungry, Broadwell, Cadden, Chartier, Dollars, Duck, Durrell, Hampel, Irish, Island, Jack's, Julius, Le Grou, Lennon, Little Long, Long (East Mills), Long (Wilson), Memesagamesing (Sag), Milton, Playfair, Seagull, Sharrow, Stanly, Toad, Wauquimakog (Wilson), West Deer

==== Lount ====
- Deer, Lake of Many Islands, Maeck, Pickerel, Spring, Tough

==== Machar ====
- Bray, Eagle, King

==== Magnetawan ====
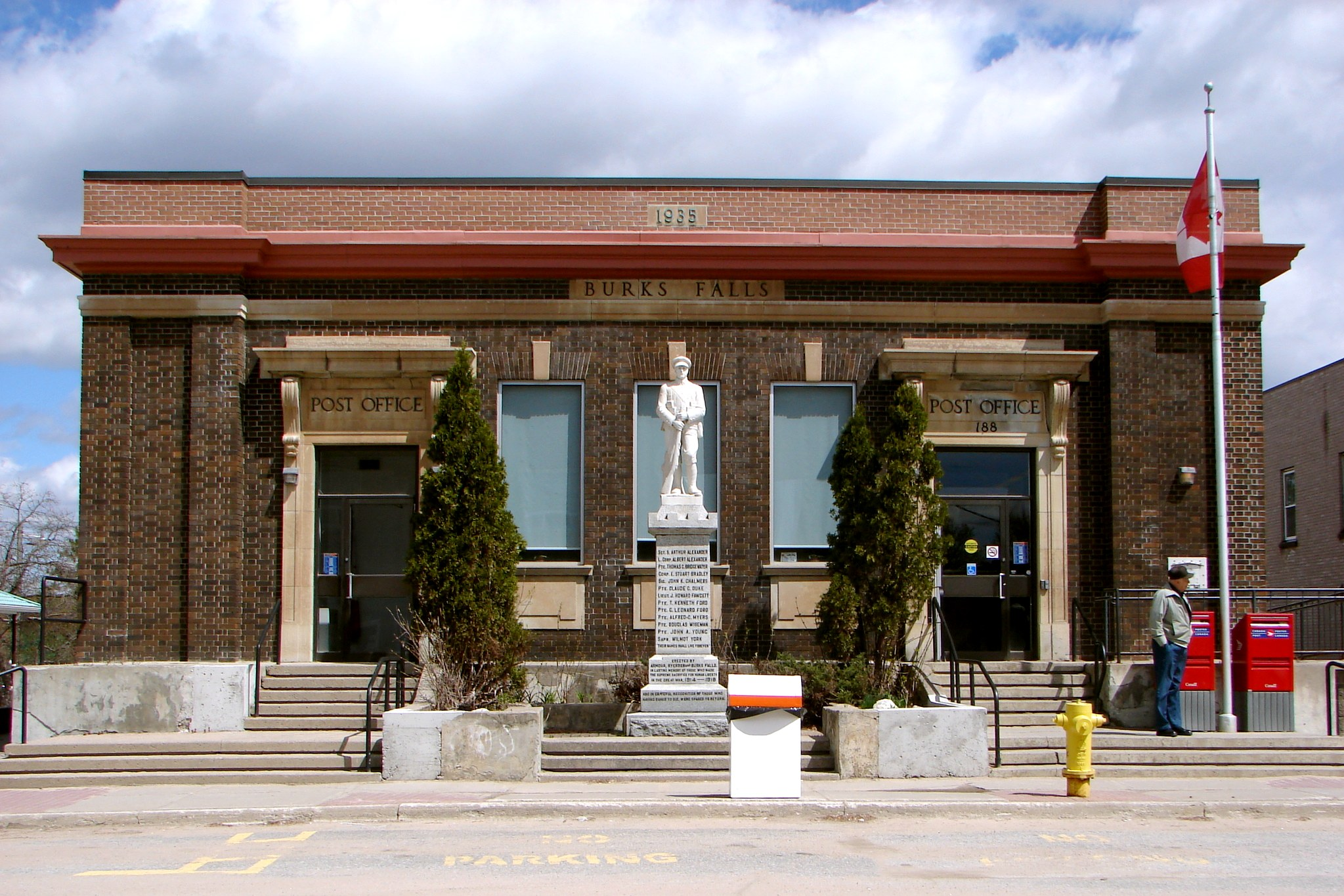
Post Office in Burk's Falls

- Ahmic, Beaver, Bells, Cecebe, Cheer, Crawford, Horn, Hughes, Jeffery, Keiller, Newell, Old Man's, Pearceley, Ryder, Seguin, Simmons, Spence, Whalley

==== McMurrich/Monteith ====
- Axe, Bear, Buck, Compass, Doe, Fifteen Mile, Horn, Meadow, Round

==== Nipissing ====
- Barton, Busch, Gerber, Long, Lynette's, McQuaby, Peachman's, Ruth, South Bay (Lake Nipissing), Wolfe

==== Perry ====
- Bay, Bittern, Brock, Clear, Emsdale, Fish, Foote, Long, Mirage, Perry, Star, Hog, Langford

==== Powassan ====
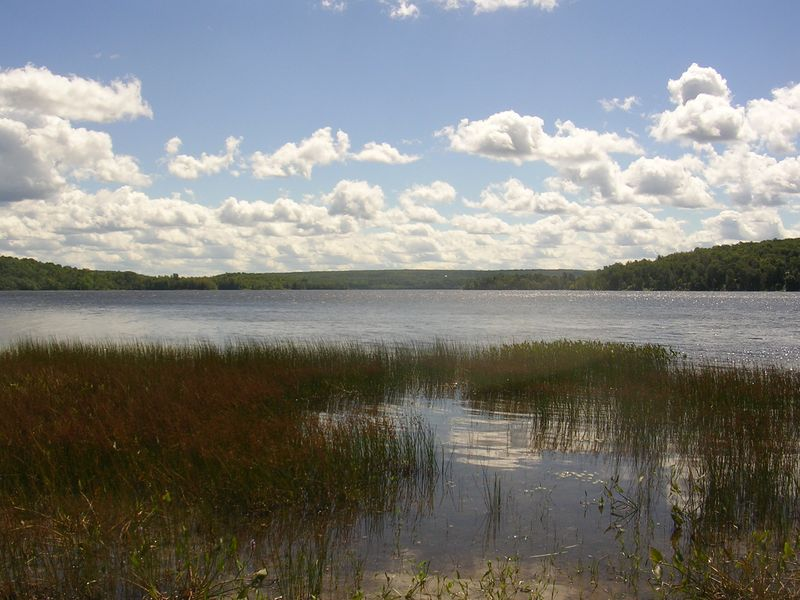
Commanda Lake as seen from Restoule

- Genesee, McQuoid, South River Reservoir (Hydro Pond)

==== Restoule ====
- Bass, Bob's, Commanda, Crooked, Lower Merrick, Upper Merrick, Patterson (Stormy), Pine, Rainy, Rausch, Restoule, Sand, Satchels, Shoal

==== Ryerson ====
- Bartlett, Cecebe, Doe, Goose, Harrison

==== Strong ====
- Bernard, Cheer, Pool

== Rivers ==
Several rivers flow through the region, including Amable du Fond River, Magnetawan River, Pickerel River, Restoule River, and South River.

== Transportation ==
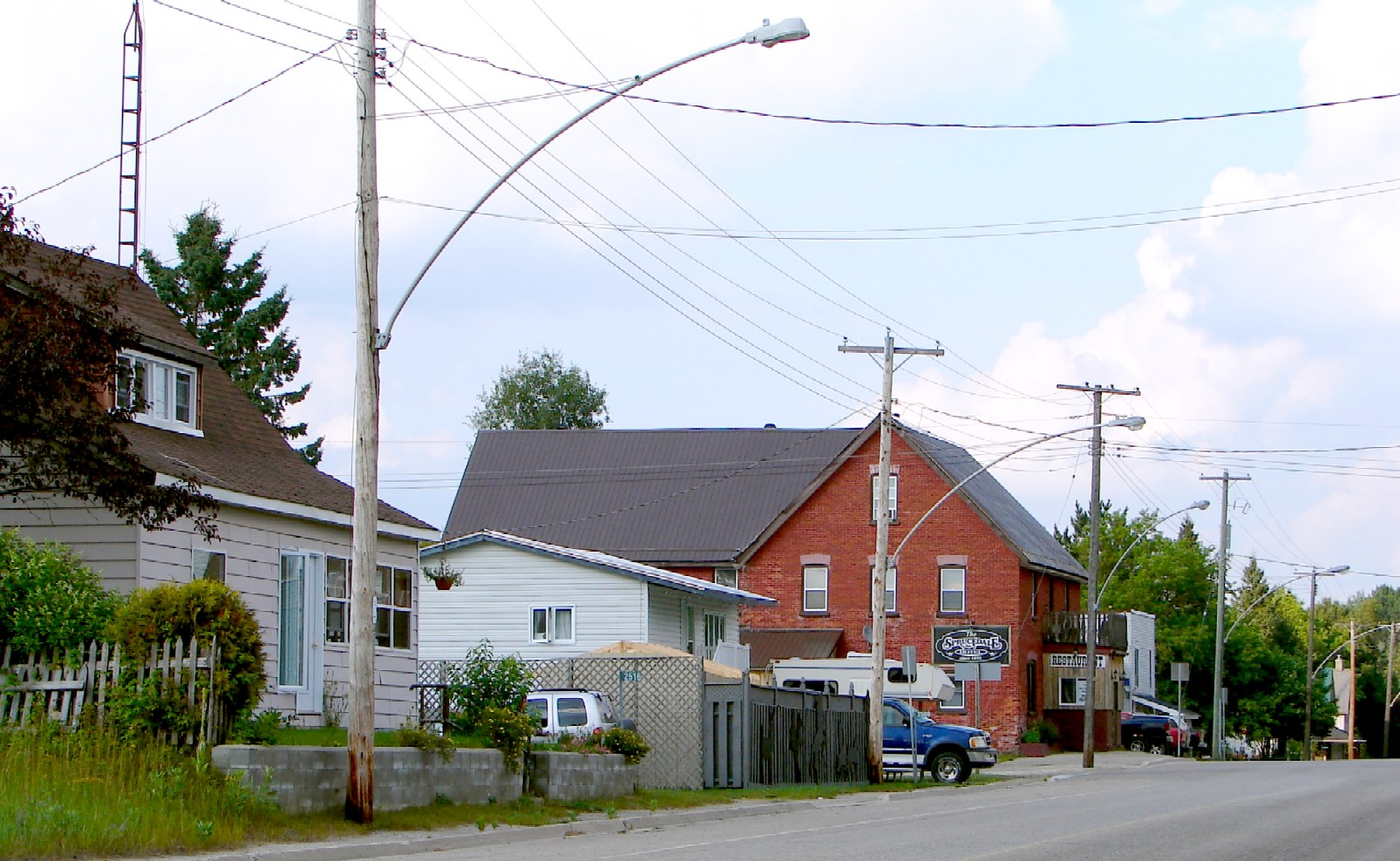
Sprucedale in McMurrich/Monteith Township

=== Highways ===
- The Almaguin Highlands are centered around what is referred to as 'the Highway 11 corridor.' Built in the early 20th century and fully four-laned by 2012, it serves as the primary in- and outflow route for most traffic travelling to and through the region. Ontario Northland Motor Coach Services stops in Emsdale, Burk's Falls, Sundridge, South River, Trout Creek, and Powassan, on its route between Toronto and Hearst along Highway 11.
- There are two King's Highways in the area, including the western portion of Highway 124, which serves the municipalities of Central Almaguin and connects the region to West Parry Sound and the town of Parry Sound. The other is a short section of Highway 94 that is located in the north end of the region, connecting Callander with East Ferris.
- Secondary highways in the region include 510, 518, 520, 522, 524, 534, 592, and 654.

=== Rail ===
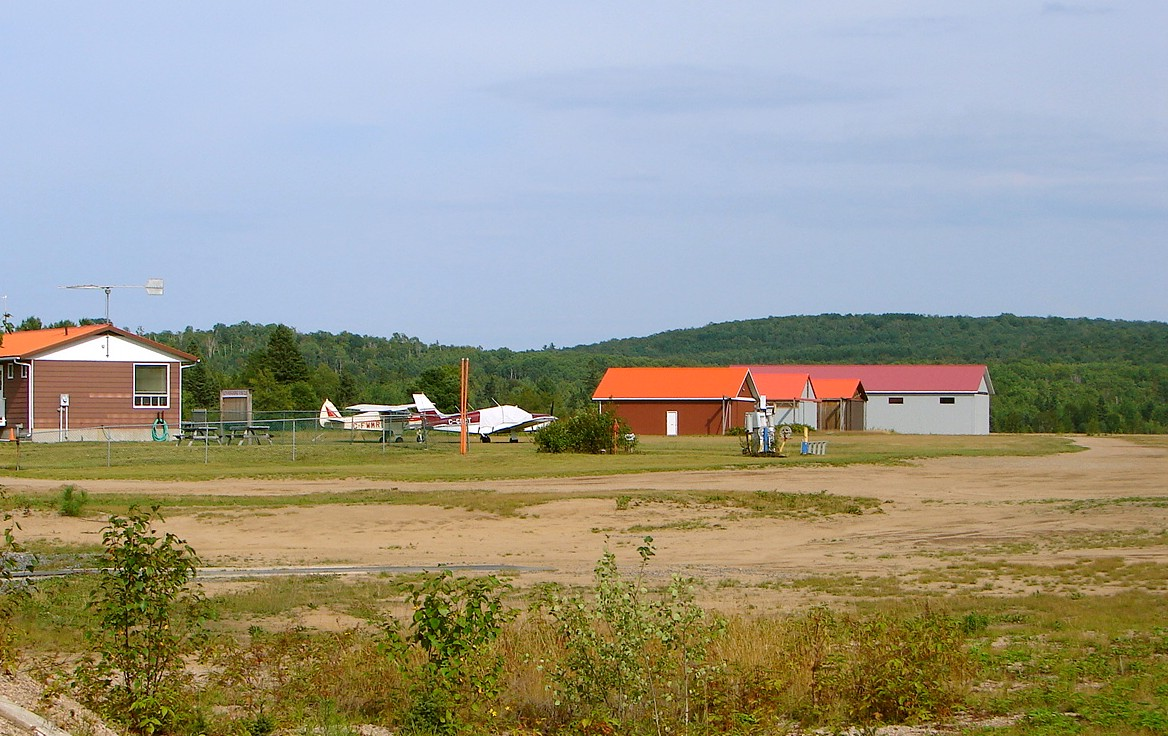
South River-Sundridge District Airport

- Parallel to Highway 11 is the main Canadian National Railway line which was built through the Highlands in the late 19th century. Communities along this rail line were serviced by the Northlander and the South River railway station, however, that train service came to an end in late 2012.

=== Air ===
- While there are no large airports located in the Almaguin Highlands, there exists two small Second World War era airports in the region: Emsdale Airport and South River-Sundridge District Airport.

== Economy ==
The economy of the Almaguin Highlands is centred on its agricultural base and the businesses that are associated with this sector. There exists a small forestry sector, however, like much of the forestry sector in Ontario, it is in decline. Mining and aggregates form part of the local economy as well. The service industry in the region mainly consists of resorts and lodges that focus on family vacationing and fishing. The local economy depends heavily on and is focused on its tourism sector. Some of the largest employers of Almaguinites are construction contractors, as a result of the expansion of Highway 11 through the region starting in the late 1980s and finishing in 2012.

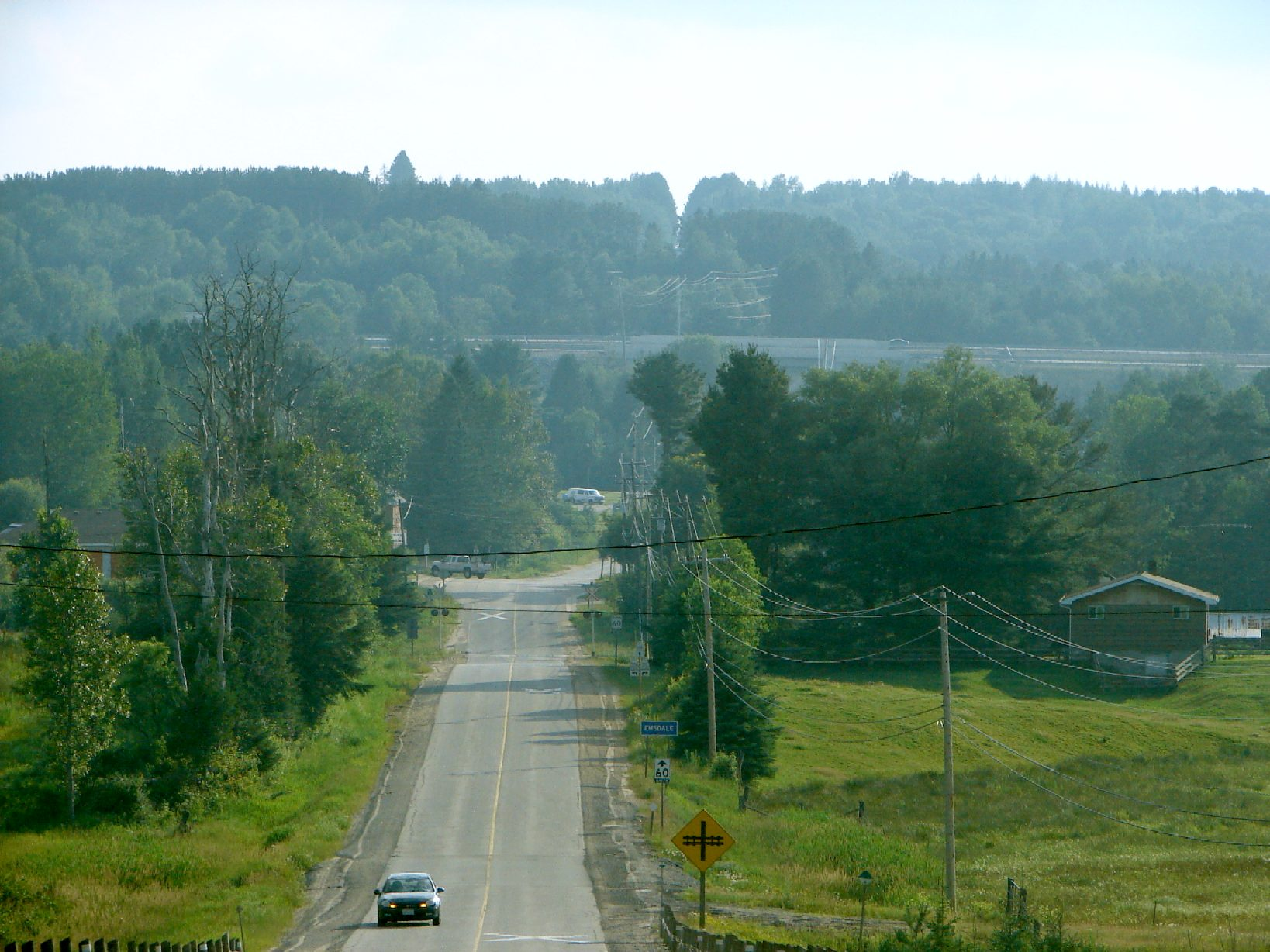
Emsdale in Perry Township

Municipalities in the region have formed economic development associations to promote, attract, and develop business in the region. These include, among others, the Central Almaguin Economic Development Association and the Almaguin Highlands Economic Development Partnership Committee.

== Politics ==
Historically, the entire region was part of the Parry Sound-Muskoka federal electoral district and the Parry Sound—Muskoka provincial riding. With the 1996 readjustments of the federal riding boundaries, and the subsequent pairing of them at the provincial level, Callander (then North Himsworth), the Township of Nipissing, and Powassan (then the Town of Powassan, the Township of South Himsworth, and the Town of Trout Creek) were transferred to the federal riding of Nipissing (now Nipissing—Timiskaming) and provincial riding Nipissing.

== Education ==
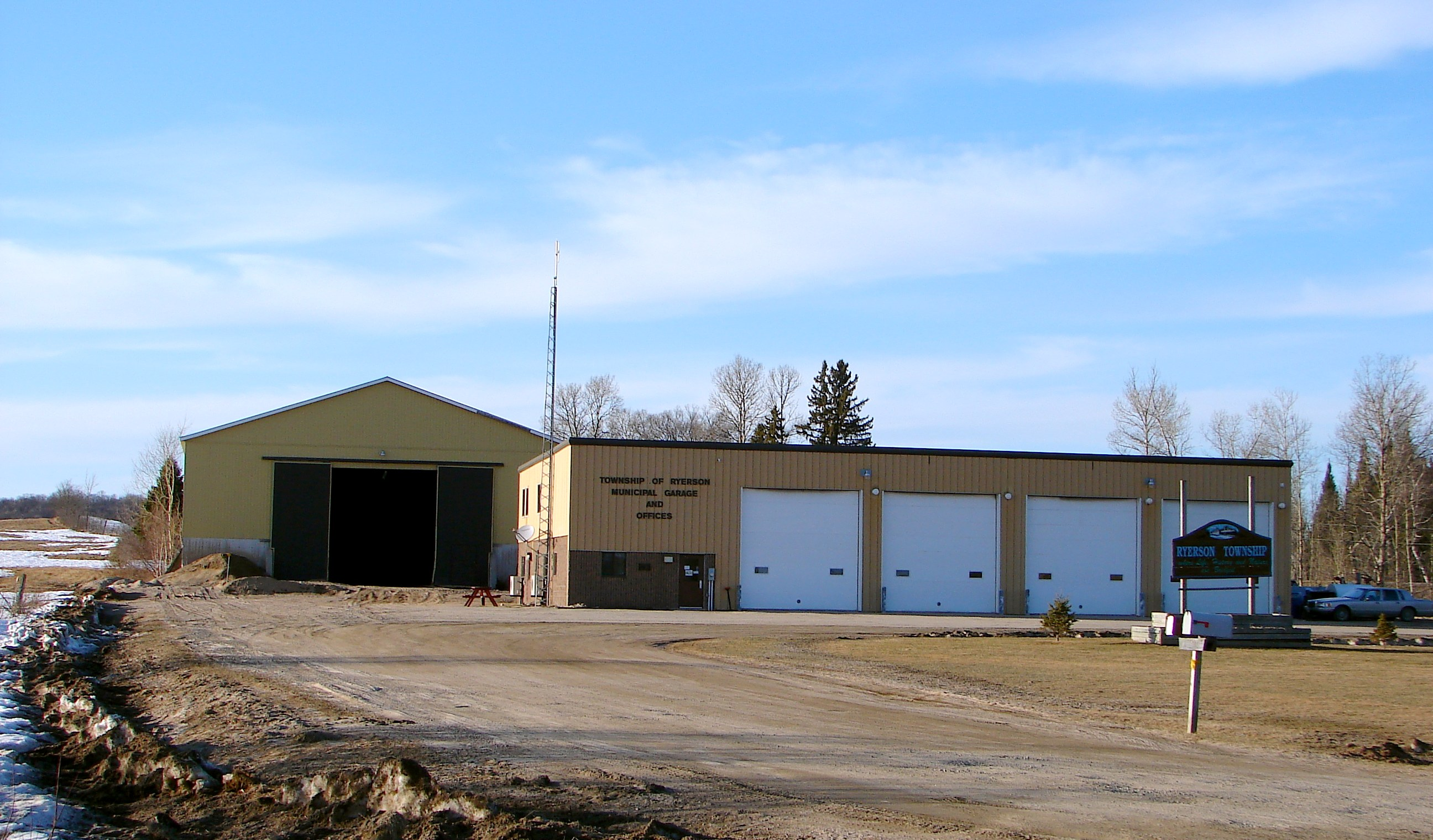
Municipal office of Ryerson Township

Public education is administered by the Near North District School Board through ten elementary schools and one secondary school, while separate Catholic education is administered by the Nipissing-Parry Sound Catholic District School Board through two elementary schools.

=== Near North District School Board ===
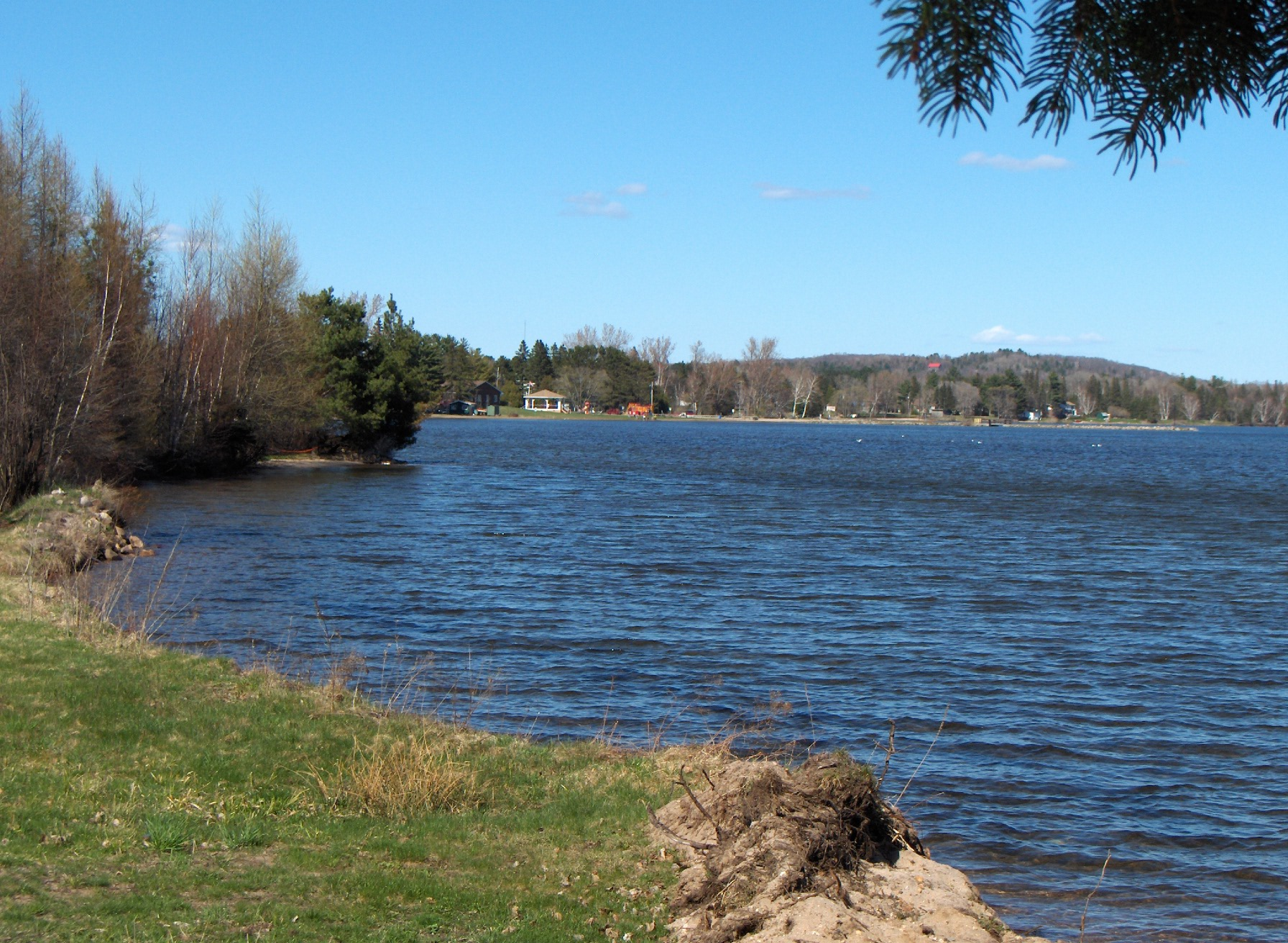
Lake Bernard

- Argyle Public School - K-8 - Port Loring
- Evergreen Heights Education Centre - K-8 - Emsdale (Perry)
- Land of Lakes Senior Public School - 5-8 (Extended French), 8 - Burk's Falls
- M.A. Wittick Junior Public School - K-7 - Burk's Falls
- M.T. Davidson Public School - K-8 - Callander
- Magnetawan Central School - K-7 - Magnetawan
- Mapleridge Public School - K-8 - Powassan
- South River Public School - K-7 - South River
- South Shore Education Centre - K-8 - Nipissing
- Sundridge Centennial Public School - K-8 - Sundridge
- Almaguin Highlands Secondary School - 9-12 - South River (Strong)

=== Nipissing-Parry Sound Catholic District School Board ===
- St. Gregory Catholic Elementary School (English) - K-8 - Powassan
- St. Theresa Catholic Elementary School (early French immersion) - K-8 - Callander

== Healthcare ==
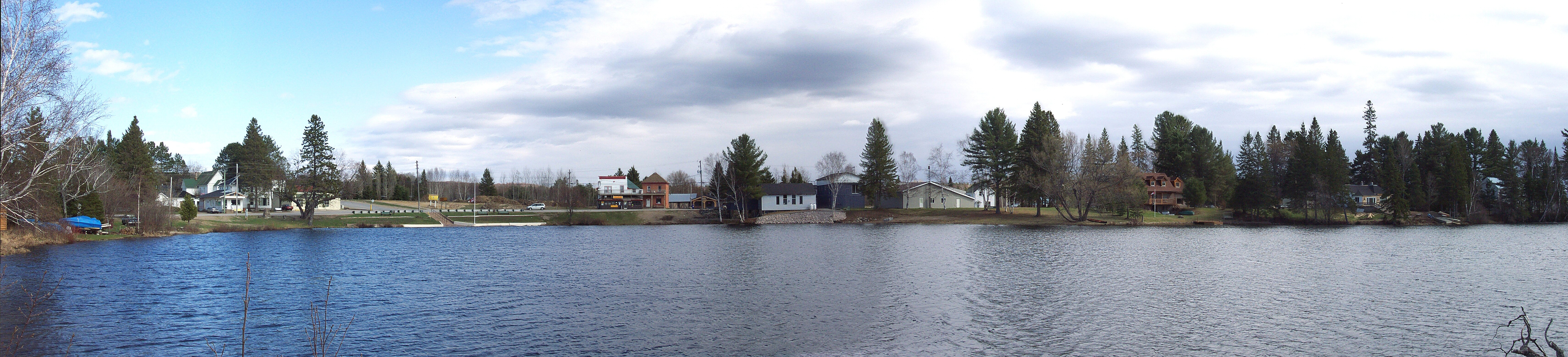
Kearney

Family Health Teams are located at health centre's in both Powassan and Burk's Falls, a medical clinic is located in Callander, and a nursing station is located in Loring. There are two ambulance stations, one in Powassan and the other in South River. However, there are no emergency medical facilities in the region. Hospitals in Parry Sound, Huntsville, and North Bay, all of which are located outside of the Almaguin Highlands, are utilized in emergency situations.

== Media ==
=== Print ===
The region is served by the Almaguin News, a weekly newspaper published in the Highlands.

== Tourism ==
=== Information Centre ===
The Almaguin Highlands are serviced by an information centre located near Emsdale along Ontario Highway 11 at the south end of the region.

=== Activities ===
Tourism activities include ATVing, camping, fishing, geocaching, hiking, horseback riding, hunting, mountain biking, snowmobiling, and other outdoor pursuits. There are numerous beaches located in the Highlands, including those found on Doe Lake, Eagle Lake, Lake Bernard, and Restoule Lake, to name a few. In addition to the beaches, there are many trails that can be found in the Almaguin Highlands, including the historic Nipissing-Rosseau Colonization Road, part of the Forgotten Trails.

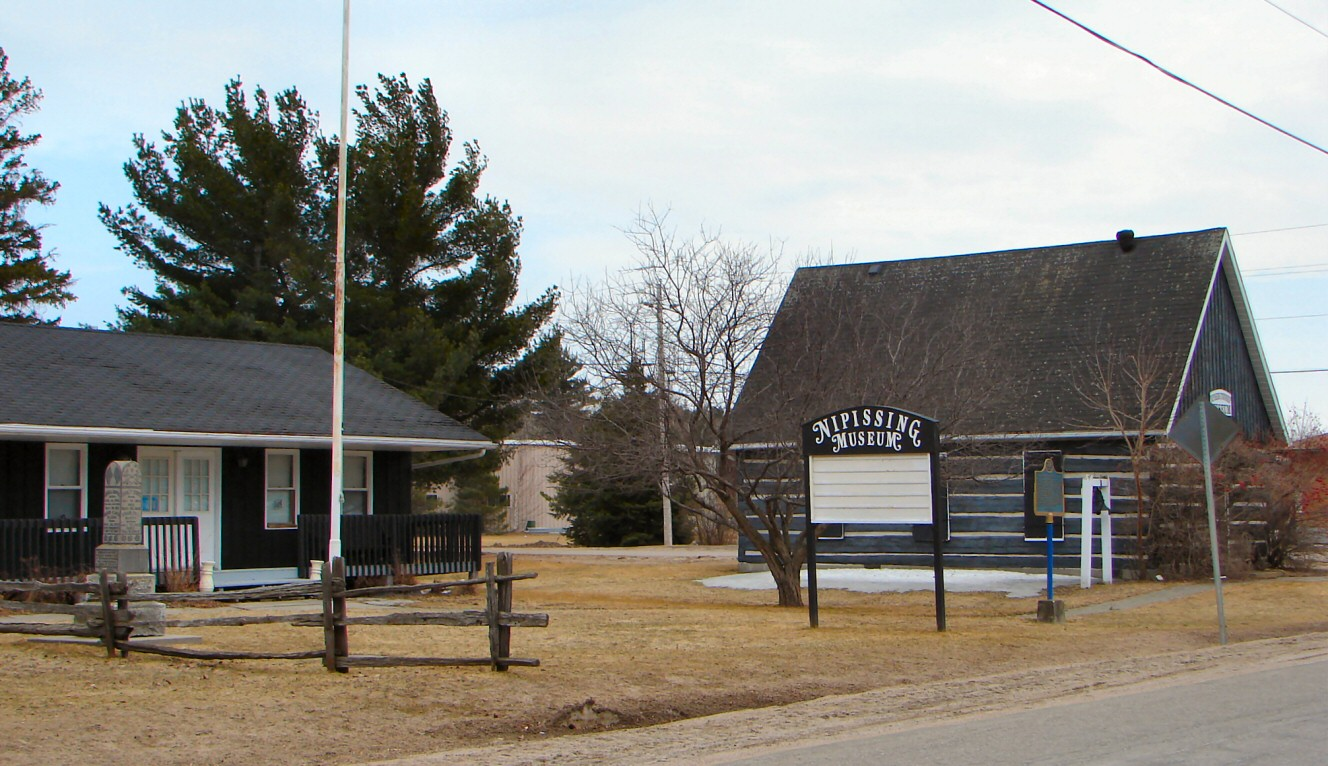
Nipissing Township Museum

The Almaguin Highlands experiences an increase in population during the summer months as a result of cottagers and other outdoor enthusiasts arriving in the region, and many of the businesses in the area are geared toward the tourism industry. In addition to the summer amenities, the winter getaway industry is growing in the Highlands.

=== Museums ===
There are six museums located in the Highlands: Callander Bay Heritage Museum in Callander; Clark House Museum in Powassan; Commanda Heritage Centre (Commanda General Store) in Commanda (Gurd), Nipissing Township; Emsdale Pioneer Museum in Perry Township; Magnetawan Heritage Centre in Magnetawan; and, Nipissing Township Museum in Nipissing Village.

=== Provincial parks ===
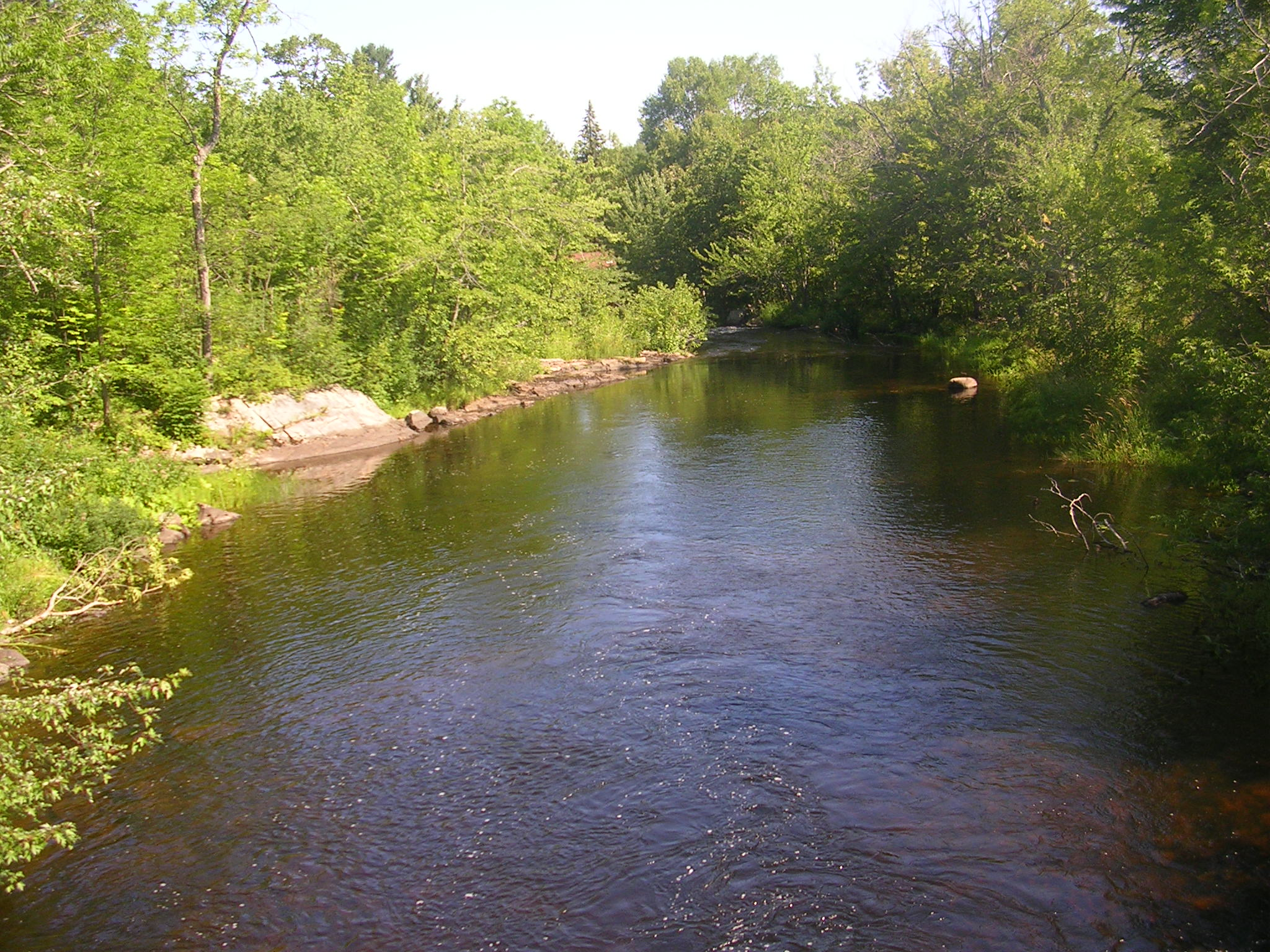
Restoule River looking north from Hawthorne Drive in Restoule

There are two provincial parks located within the Almaguin Highlands: Mikisew Provincial Park, and Restoule Provincial Park. In addition, the Almaguin Highlands acts as a portal to western Algonquin Park at the access points of Kawawaymog (Round) Lake Access; Tim River Access; Magnetawan Lake Access; and Rain Lake Access.

== Notable people ==
Peter Camani is a retired teacher, Almaguin Highlands Secondary School. He is also an artist and sculptor who has created Midlothian Castle, an unusual residence, castle, and sculpture garden on an old farm near Burk's Falls. His artwork can be found at the Vatican and Buckingham Palace and Midlothian Castle has been featured on several television shows.

Hawksley Workman is a rock singer-songwriter who has garnered critical acclaim for his blend of cabaret pop and glam rock. He was born in Huntsville and attended Almaguin Highlands Secondary School and later moved to Toronto.
