= Bob's Lake (Parry Sound District) =

Lake in Canada

- Location of Bob's Lake in Ontario.
- Location: Parry Sound District, Ontario, Canada
- Coordinates: 46°02′14″N 79°47′40″W
- Type: Lake
- Part of: Great Lakes Basin
- Max. length: 610 m (2,000 ft)
- Max. width: 230 m (750 ft)
- Surface elevation: 257 m (843 ft)

Bob's Lake is a lake in geographic Patterson Township in the Unorganized Centre Part of Parry Sound District in Central Ontario, Canada. It is in the Great Lakes Basin, and the nearest community is Restoule, 6 kilometres (4 mi) to the east. It is located in the Almaguin Highlands.

== Hydrology ==
The primary outflow, at the north, is an unnamed creek to Kidd Lake. It flows via Rainy Creek, the Memesagamesing River, and the French River to Georgian Bay on Lake Huron.

== See also ==
- List of lakes in Ontario
