= Ruth Lake (Ontario) =

Lake in Parry Sound District, Ontario, Canada

- Location within Ontario
- Location: Nipissing Township, Ontario
- Coordinates: 46.012983°N 79.513893°W
- Basin countries: Canada
- Max. length: 2.3 kilometres (1.4 mi)
- Max. depth: 17 metres (56 ft)

Ruth Lake is spring-fed lake located in Nipissing Township, in the Almaguin Highlands region of Parry Sound District, Ontario, Canada.

== See also ==
- List of lakes in Ontario
