= Shawanaga 17B =

- Indian reserve
- Shawanaga Indian Reserve No. 17B
- Location within Southern Ontario
- Coordinates: 45°31′N 80°23′W
- Country: Canada
- Province: Ontario
- District: Parry Sound
- First Nation: Shawanaga

Area
  - Land: 0.75 km^{2} (0.29 sq mi)

Shawanaga 17B is a First Nations reserve on Georgian Bay in Parry Sound District, Ontario. It is one of the reserves of the Shawanaga First Nation.
