= Crawford Lake (Parry Sound District) =

Lake in Parry Sound District, Ontario, Canada

- Location of Crawford Lake in Ontario
- Location: Magnetawan, Parry Sound District, Ontario
- Coordinates: 45°36′08″N 79°44′35″W
- Primary inflows: Neighick River, Wylie Creek
- Primary outflows: Channel to Beaver Lake
- Basin countries: Canada
- Max. length: 1.7 km (1.1 mi)
- Max. width: 1 km (0.62 mi)
- Surface elevation: 279 m (915 ft)

Crawford Lake is a lake in the Magnetawan River drainage basin in the township of Magnetawan, Almaguin Highlands region, Parry Sound District, Ontario, Canada. It is about 1.7 kilometres (1.1 mi) long and 1 kilometre (0.6 mi) wide, and lies at an elevation of 279 metres (915 ft). The primary inflows are the Neighick River and Wylie Creek. The primary outflow is a channel to Beaver Lake, which flows via The Narrows channel into Ahmic Lake on the Magnetawan River, and thence into Lake Huron.

== See also ==
- List of lakes in Ontario
