= Lount Township, Ontario =

Lount
- Geographic township
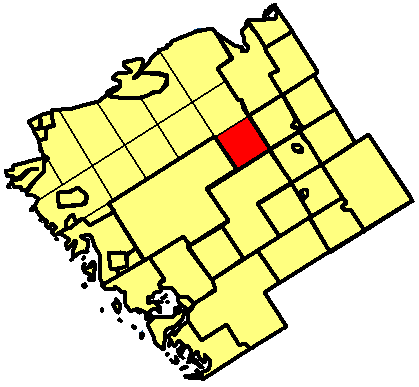
- Location of Lount Township in Parry Sound District

- Location of Lount Township in Ontario
- Coordinates: 45°49′59″N 79°38′56″W
- Country: Canada
- Province: Ontario
- Municipality: Parry Sound, Unorganized, Centre
- Time zone: UTC-5 (Eastern Time Zone)
  - Summer (DST): UTC-4 (Eastern Time Zone)
- Postal code FSA: P0A
- Area codes: 705, 249

Lount is a geographic township in the Unorganized Centre Part of Parry Sound District in Central Ontario, Canada. The communities of Bummer's Roost, Rye and Wattenwyle are located in the township. It originally was settled by the building of the Rosseau and Nipssing Road which cuts diagonally through the township. Lount is part of the Almaguin Highlands region.

== Etymology ==
This township in Parry Sound District was named in 1874 for William Lount (1840–1903), Liberal member for Simcoe North in the Legislative Assembly of Ontario, 1867–71, and for Toronto Centre in the House of Commons, 1896–7. He was subsequently appointed a judge in the High Court of Ontario. William Lount was a nephew of Samuel Lount, who led a party of reformers in the Rebellion of 1837 and was put to death the following year.

== See also ==
- List of townships in Ontario
