= Shawanaga 17 =

- Indian reserve
- Shawanaga Indian Reserve No. 17
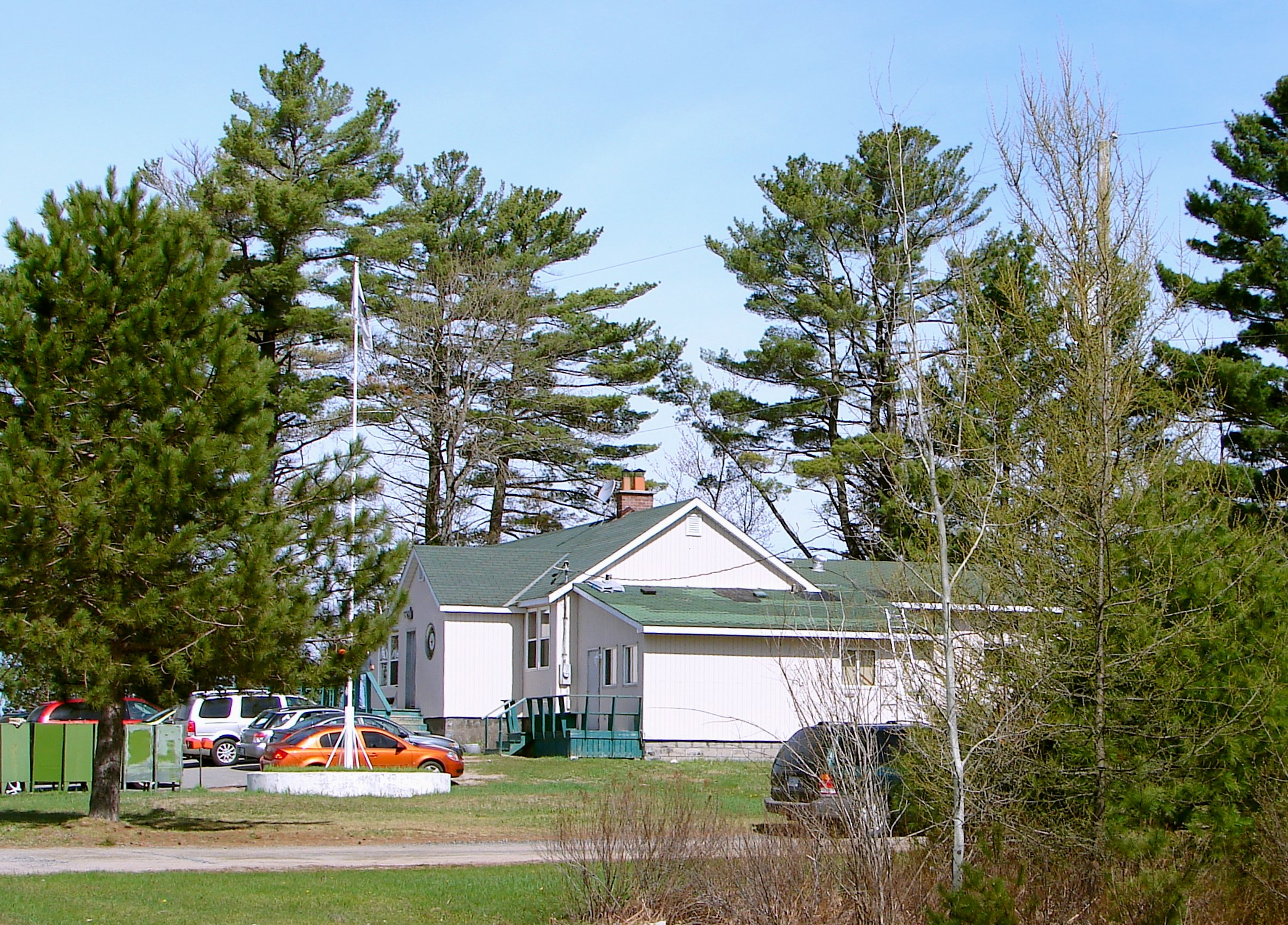

- Location within Southern Ontario
- Coordinates: 45°32′N 80°18′W
- Country: Canada
- Province: Ontario
- District: Parry Sound
- First Nation: Shawanaga

Area
  - Land: 32.07 km^{2} (12.38 sq mi)

Population (2011)
  - Total: 213
  - Density: 6.6/km^{2} (17/sq mi)
- Website: shawanagafirstnation.ca

Shawanaga 17 is an Anishinaabe First Nations reserve in Parry Sound District, Ontario. It is one of the reserves of the Shawanaga First Nation.
