= Gurd Township, Ontario =

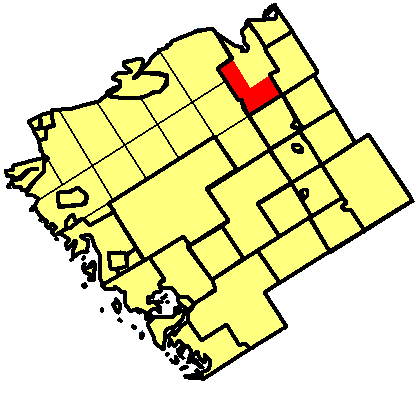
Map of Parry Sound District highlighting Gurd Township

Gurd Township is an historical geographic township in central Ontario, Canada, in the Almaguin Highlands region of Parry Sound District. It was first surveyed in 1875 and was named after Robert Sinclair Gurd, a businessman and one-time mayor of Sarnia. In 1970, Gurd was annexed by the incorporated (Township municipality of) Nipissing.

The township was shaped like an "L" wrapping around Nipissing. It was bounded on the north and northwest by Patterson Township on the west by Pringle Township, on the east and northeast by Nipissing, on the east by South Himsworth Township and on the south by Machar Township. It included the community of Hotham and part of Commanda.

When it was annexed, Gurd had a population of 260 while Nipissing had 550. Today, the population is approximately 300 (419 including the nearby community of Alsace).

Gurd is home to the Bray Lake Conservation Reserve, South River Forest Provincial Conservation Reserve and the John P. Webster Nature Preserve. Highway 522 runs through the south of the township while Highway 534 cuts through the north at Hotham. Gurd is home to Lockharts Mountain 45°58′1.112″N 79°28′31.194″W, the highest elevation in the Township of Nipissing at 432m (1,417ft).

== Etymology ==
This township in Parry Sound District was named in 1875 for Robert S. Gurd, a Sarnia lawyer. He was a personal friend of Timothy B. Pardee, Ontario commissioner of crown lands at the time.

== See also ==
- List of townships in Ontario
