= Shawanaga First Nation =

Shawanaga First Nation is an Anishinaabe First Nation band government in central Ontario near Nobel. Its reserves include:

- Naiscoutaing 17A
- Shawanaga 17
- Shawanaga 17B

Shawanaga First Nation is located in Ontario at 45.517°N 80.284°W. The community is approximately 30 kilometres northwest of Parry Sound and approximately 150 kilometres southeast of Sudbury. The community has year-round road access from Ontario Highway 69, with a First Nation-owned gas bar and convenience store at the entrance to the community. However, the pace of land use negotiations between the First Nation and the provincial government has been one of the factors that has delayed the conversion of Highway 69 to freeway.

The traditional territory of Shawanaga is bordered by the Seguin River to the south, the Magnetawan River to the north and extending to Georgian Bay (including the 30,000 islands) and east to the Ottawa valley. There are three areas that make up Shawanaga First Nation: Shawanaga, Shawanaga Landing and Naiscoutaing.

Shawanaga First Nation has maintained rights due to being a signatory of the Robinson-Huron Treaty of 1850 of which there is a four dollar annuity because of their Ojibway-speaking ancestors having signed that treaty.
