= Unorganized North East Parry Sound District =

- Unorganized area
- Parry Sound, Unorganized, North East Part
- Location of Unorganized North East Parry Sound in Ontario
- Coordinates: 45°55′N 79°18′W
- Country: Canada
- Province: Ontario
- District: Parry Sound

Area
  - Land: 183.04 km^{2} (70.67 sq mi)

Population (2021)
  - Total: 179
  - Density: 1/km^{2} (2.6/sq mi)
- Time zone: UTC-5 (Eastern Time Zone)
  - Summer (DST): UTC-4 (EDT)

Unorganized North East Parry Sound District is an unorganized area in Parry Sound District in Central Ontario, Canada. It is contiguous with the geographic township of Laurier and served by the local services board of Laurier The area, part of the Almaguin Highlands region, had a population of 179 in the 2021 Canadian census, and a land area of 183.04 square kilometres.

== Etymology ==
The geographic township of Laurier in Parry Sound District was named in 1878 for Wilfrid (later Sir Wilfrid) Laurier (1841–1919), then minister of inland revenue in Alexander Mackenzie's government and later Prime Minister of Canada, 1896–1911.

== Demographics ==
Canada census – Unorganized North East Parry Sound District community profile

	2021	2016
Population	179 (-4.3% from 2016)	187 (-15.8% from 2011)
Land area	183.04 km^{2} (70.67 sq mi)	183.29 km^{2} (70.77 sq mi)
Population density	1.0/km^{2} (2.6/sq mi)	1.0/km^{2} (2.6/sq mi)
Median age	50.8 (M: 53.6, F: 49.2)	53.3 (M: 53.1, F: 53.7)
Private dwellings	81 (total) 73 (occupied)	102 (total) 82 (occupied)
Median household income	$ n/a	$67,584

References: 2021 2016

Historical census populations – Parry Sound, Unorganized, North East Part, Unorganized

Year	Pop.	±%
1976	142	—
1981	166	+16.9%
1986	161	−3.0%
1991	184	+14.3%
1996	189	+2.7%

Year	Pop.	±%
2001	185	−2.1%
2006	236	+27.6%
2011	222	−5.9%
2016	187	−15.8%
2021	179	−4.3%

2011 Population figure based on revised count.
Source: Statistics Canada

== Transportation ==
The Canadian National Railway transcontinental main line and Ontario Highway 11 travel a roughly parallel course from the middle of the western edge to the centre of the northern edge of the township.
