= Bass Lake (Ontario) =

Bass Lake is the name of several lakes in Ontario:

- Bass Lake (Manitoulin District, Ontario)
- Bass Lake (Rideau Lakes, Ontario) (Leeds & Grenville)
- Bass Lake (Leeds and the Thousand Islands, Ontario) (Leeds & Grenville)
- Bass Lake (Grey County, Ontario)
- Bass Lake (Patterson Township, Ontario) (Parry Sound District)
- Bass Lake (Wilson Township, Ontario) (Parry Sound District)
- Bass Lake (Simcoe County, Ontario)
- Bass Lake (Telfer Township, Ontario) (Sudbury District)
- Bass Lake (Mongowin Township, Ontario) (Sudbury District)
- Bass Lake (Parkin Township, Ontario) (Sudbury District)
- Bass Lake (Kilarney, Ontario) (Sudbury District)
- Bass Lake (Whitefish Lake 6, Ontario) (Sudbury District)
- Bass Lake (Haenstschel Township, Ontario) (Sudbury District)
- Bass Lake (Morse Township, Ontario) (Sudbury District)
- Bass Lake (Syine Township, Ontario) (Thunder Bay District)
- Bass Lake (Baril Lake) (Thunder Bay District)
- Bass Lake (Kashabowie Lake) (Thunder Bay District)
- Bass Lake (McTavish Township, Ontario) (Thunder Bay District)
- Bass Lake (Winnipeg River) (Kenora District)
- Bass Lake (Cameron Lake) (Kenora District)
- Bass Lake (Eagle Lake) (Kenora District)
- Bass Lake (Gravenhurst, Ontario) (Muskoka)
- Bass Lake (Muskoka Lakes, Ontario) (Muskoka)
- Bass Lake (Valley East, Ontario) (Sudbury)
- Bass Lake (Timiskaming District, Ontario)
- Bass Lake (Striker Township, Ontario) (Algoma District)
- Bass Lake (Aberdeen Township, Ontario) (Algoma District)
- Bass Lake (Peterborough County, Ontario)
- Bass Lake (Rainy River District, Ontario)
- Bass Lake (Renfrew County, Ontario)
- Bass Lake (South Frontenac, Ontario) (Frontenac County)
- Bass Lake (Central Frontenac, Ontario) (Frontenac County)
