= Joly, Ontario =

Joly
- Township (single-tier)
- Township of Joly
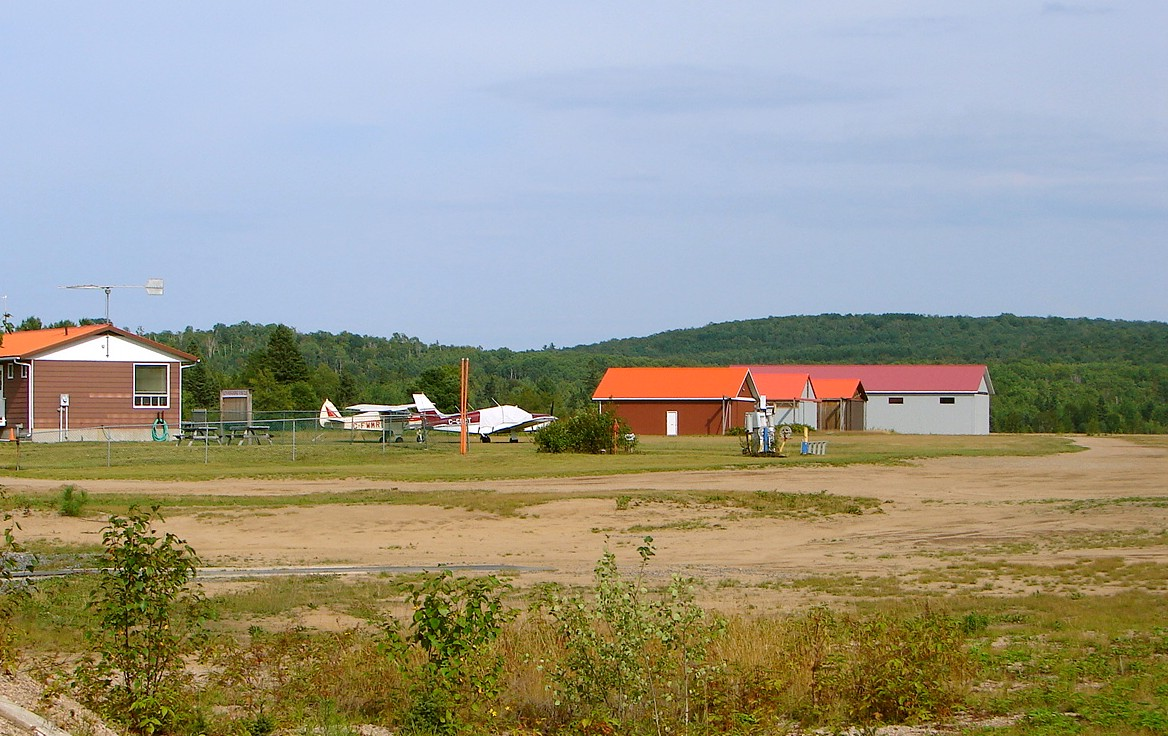
- South River-Sundridge District Airport

- Location within Southern Ontario
- Coordinates: 45°47′N 79°15′W
- Country: Canada
- Province: Ontario
- District: Parry Sound
- Settled: 1880s
- Incorporated: 1890

Government
  - Type: Township
  - Mayor: Brian McCabe
  - Fed. riding: Parry Sound-Muskoka
  - Prov. riding: Parry Sound—Muskoka

Area
  - Land: 193.95 km^{2} (74.88 sq mi)

Population (2021)
  - Total: 293
  - Density: 1.5/km^{2} (3.9/sq mi)
- Time zone: UTC-5 (EST)
  - Summer (DST): UTC-4 (EDT)
- Postal Code: P0A
- Area codes: 705, 249
- Website: www.townshipofjoly.com

Joly is a township in the Almaguin Highlands region of Parry Sound District of the Canadian province of Ontario.

The township has no named communities within its boundaries; all addresses in the township are rural routes assigned to the adjacent communities of South River, Sundridge, Hartfell or Pevensey. The South River-Sundridge District Airport is in Joly.

== Demographics ==
In the 2021 Census of Population conducted by Statistics Canada, Joly had a population of 293 living in 127 of its 155 total private dwellings, a change of −3.6% from its 2016 population of 304. With a land area of 193.95 km^{2} (74.88 sq mi), it had a population density of 1.5/km^{2} (3.9/sq mi) in 2021.

Historical census populations – Joly, Ontario

Year	Pop.	±%
1901	268	—
1911	206	−23.1%
1921	169	−18.0%
1931	188	+11.2%
1941	166	−11.7%
1951	145	−12.7%
1956	125	−13.8%

Year	Pop.	±%
1961	127	+1.6%
1966	87	−31.5%
1971	81	−6.9%
1976	130	+60.5%
1981	178	+36.9%
1986	191	+7.3%
1991	248	+29.8%

Year	Pop.	±%
1996	311	+25.4%
2001	290	−6.8%
2006	280	−3.4%
2011	284	+1.4%
2016	304	+7.0%
2021	293	−3.6%

Source: Statistics Canada

Mother tongue (2021):

- English as first language: 93.2%
- French as first language: 1.7%
- Other as first language: 3.4%

== See also ==
- List of townships in Ontario
