= Ryerson, Ontario =

Ryerson
- Township (single-tier)
- Township of Ryerson
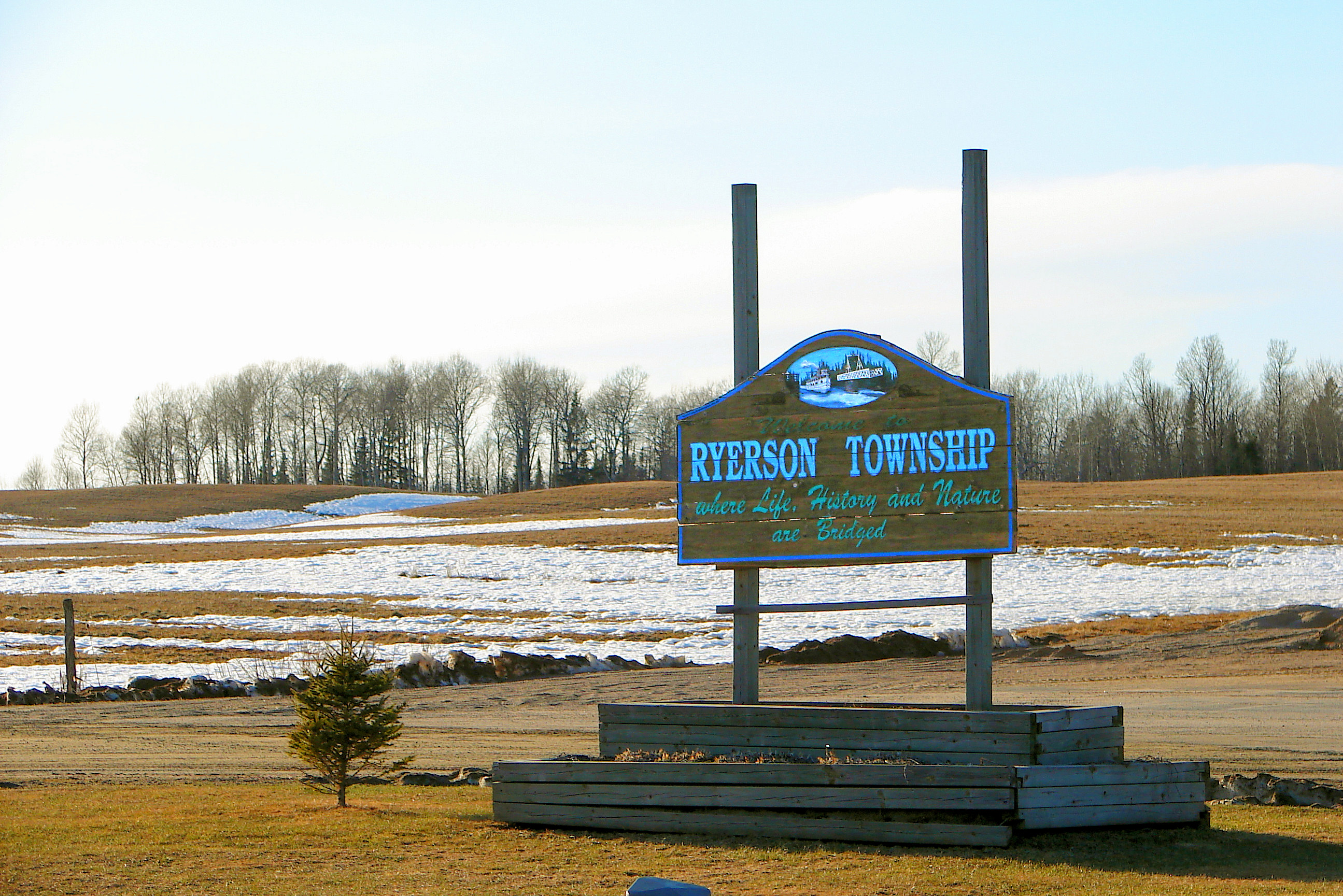

- Location within Southern Ontario
- Coordinates: 45°35′13″N 79°30′40″W
- Country: Canada
- Province: Ontario
- District: Parry Sound
- Settled: 1870s
- Incorporated: 1880

Government
  - Type: Township
  - Reeve: George Sterling
  - Fed. riding: Parry Sound-Muskoka
  - Prov. riding: Parry Sound—Muskoka

Area
  - Land: 185.93 km^{2} (71.79 sq mi)

Population (2021)
  - Total: 745
  - Density: 4/km^{2} (10/sq mi)
- Time zone: UTC-5 (EST)
  - Summer (DST): UTC-4 (EDT)
- Postal Code: P0A
- Area codes: 705, 249
- Website: www.ryersontownship.ca

Ryerson is an incorporated township in the Almaguin Highlands region of Parry Sound District in northeastern Ontario, Canada. It had a population of 745 in the 2021 Canadian census. It was named after Egerton Ryerson, the Chief Superintendent of Education for Ontario from 1844 to 1876.

== Communities ==
- Doe Lake
- Midlothian
- Rockwynn
- Starratt
- Wisemans Corners
- Bourdeau (on boundary with McMurrich/Monteith)

== Demographics ==
In the 2021 Census of Population conducted by Statistics Canada, Ryerson had a population of 745 living in 344 of its 555 total private dwellings, a change of 15% from its 2016 population of 648. With a land area of 185.93 km^{2} (71.79 sq mi), it had a population density of 4.0/km^{2} (10.4/sq mi) in 2021.

Historical census populations – Ryerson, Ontario

Year	Pop.	±%
1901	761	—
1911	698	−8.3%
1921	559	−19.9%
1931	651	+16.5%
1941	556	−14.6%
1951	436	−21.6%
1956	482	+10.6%

Year	Pop.	±%
1961	472	−2.1%
1966	366	−22.5%
1971	384	+4.9%
1976	442	+15.1%
1981	412	−6.8%
1986	457	+10.9%
1991	625	+36.8%

Year	Pop.	±%
1996	676	+8.2%
2001	632	−6.5%
2006	686	+8.5%
2011	634	−7.6%
2016	648	+2.2%
2021	745	+15.0%

Source: Statistics Canada

Mother tongue (2021):

- English as first language: 93.3%
- French as first language: 2.0%
- English and French as first languages: 0.7%
- Other as first language: 4.0%

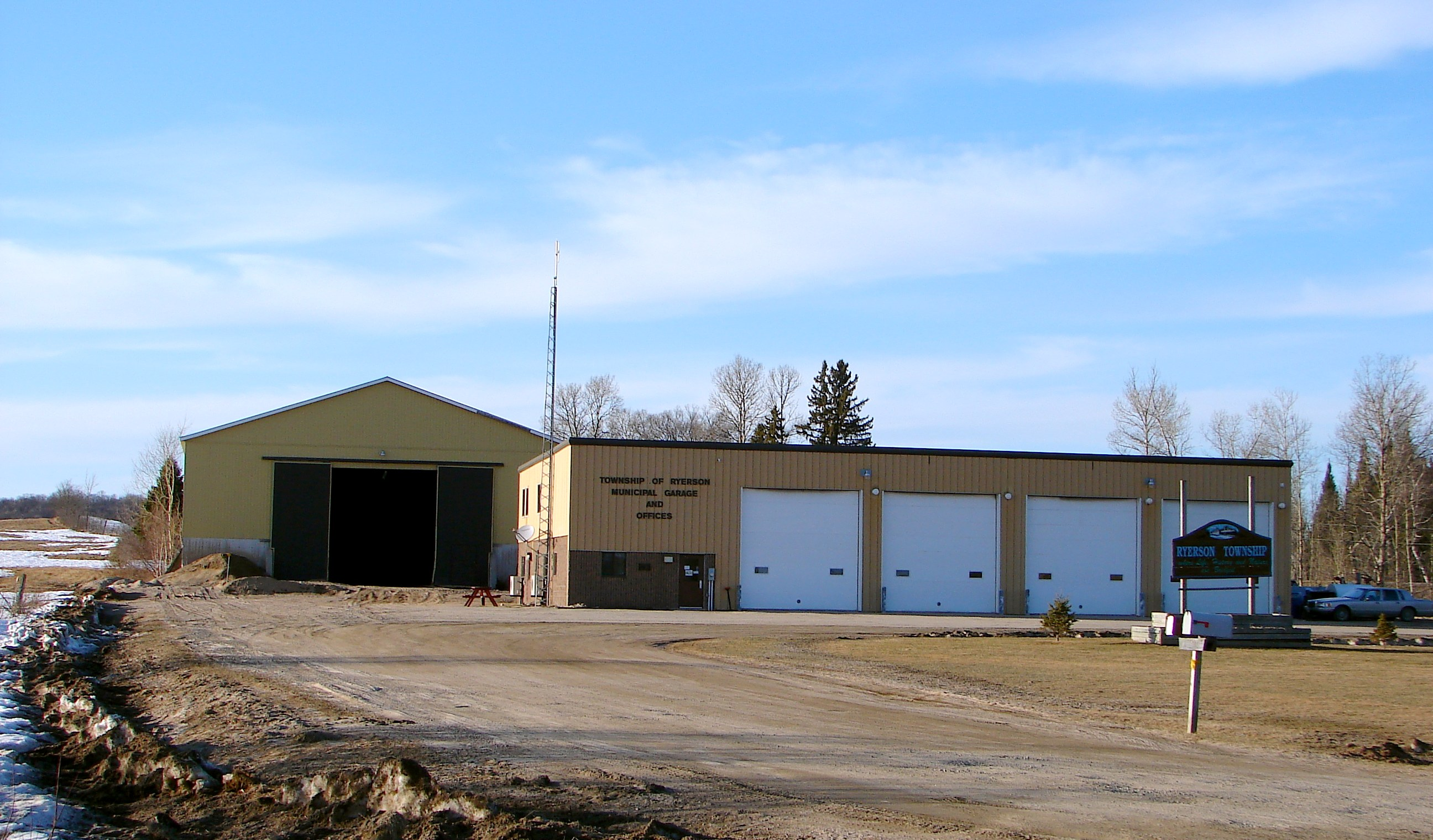
Municipal office

== See also ==
- List of townships in Ontario
