= South River, Ontario =

South River
- Village (single-tier)
- Village of South River
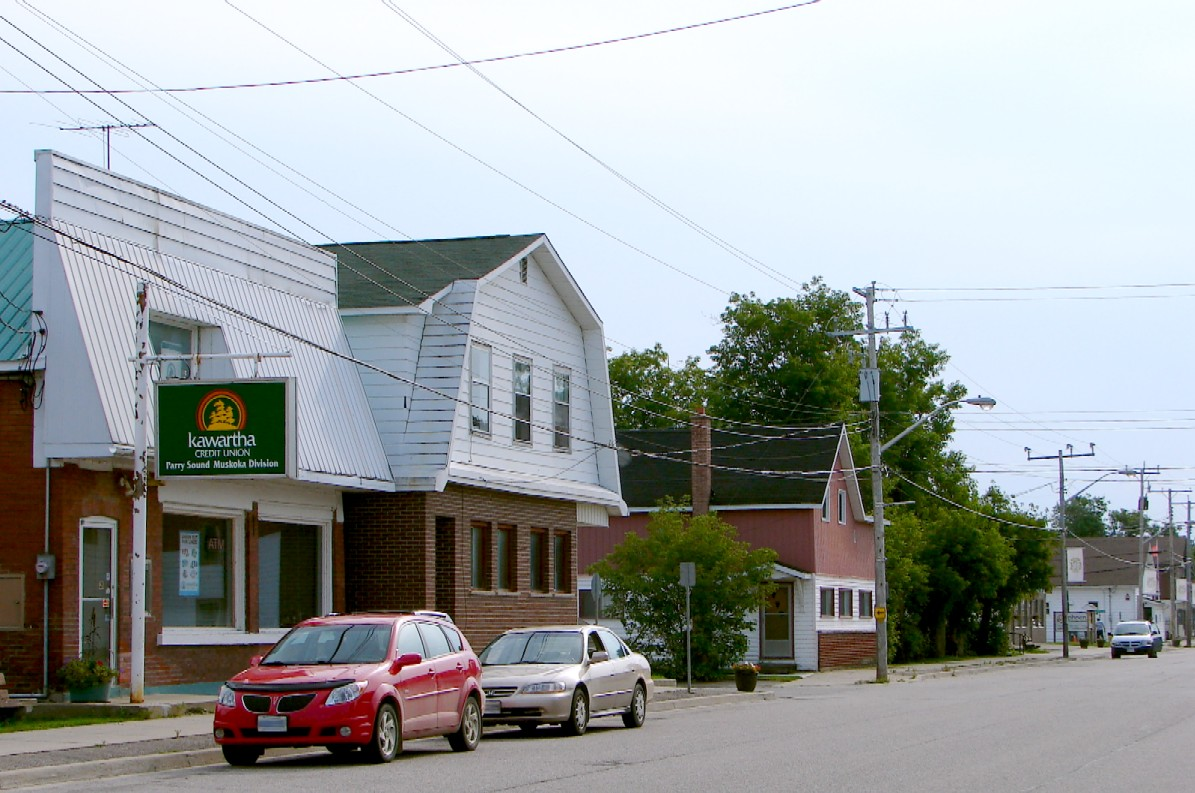
- Ottawa Avenue, the main thoroughfare in South River

- Location within Parry Sound District Location within Southern Ontario
- Coordinates: 45°50.5′N 79°22.5′W
- Country: Canada
- Province: Ontario
- District: Parry Sound
- Settled: 1881
- Incorporated: 1907

Government
  - Type: Village
  - Mayor: Jim Coleman
  - Fed. riding: Parry Sound-Muskoka
  - Prov. riding: Parry Sound—Muskoka

Area
  - Land: 4.11 km^{2} (1.59 sq mi)

Population (2021)
  - Total: 1,101
  - Density: 268/km^{2} (690/sq mi)
- Time zone: UTC-5 (EST)
  - Summer (DST): UTC-4 (EDT)
- Postal Code: P0A 1X0
- Area code: 705 (386 exchange)
- Website: www.southriverontario.com

South River is a village on Highway 124 near Algonquin Park in the Almaguin Highlands region of Parry Sound District of Ontario, Canada. It is about halfway between North Bay and Huntsville or a 3-hour drive (300 km) north from Toronto. South River has access to the Algonquin Park for canoeists at Kawawaymog (Round Lake). South River is home of Mikisew Provincial Park on the shores of Eagle Lake.

== History ==
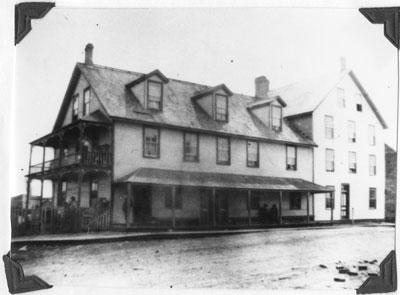
The "Old Queen's Hotel" around 1900.

Logging in the area began in the 1860s, but it was not until 1881 when the first settlers, Robert Carter and his wife, arrived following the completion of the Grand Trunk Railway. Within a few years, they opened a general store and the new community, located on the eponymous South River, had hotels, a bank, a butcher shop, and jeweller. The river itself provided the power for a sawmill and grist mill, while also being used for log driving. In 1907, the village separated from Machar Township and was incorporated, with W.J. Ard as first reeve.

On Thanksgiving weekend of 1997, tragedy struck at the Hanson Homestead on Eagle Lake Road, when a lightning strike hit a group of eight working on the family maple syrup lines, and fatally injuring Dino Devalis. This strike was brought to light in the 2009 Canadian documentary Act of God by Jennifer Baichwal and featured an interview with Jean Ivens about the event.

== Demographics ==
In the 2021 Census of Population conducted by Statistics Canada, South River had a population of 1,101 living in 482 of its 510 total private dwellings, a change of −1.2% from its 2016 population of 1,114. With a land area of 4.11 km^{2} (1.59 sq mi), it had a population density of 267.9/km^{2} (693.8/sq mi) in 2021.

Historical census populations – South River, Ontario

Year	Pop.	±%
1901	294	—
1911	593	+101.7%
1921	573	−3.4%
1931	672	+17.3%
1941	838	+24.7%
1951	943	+12.5%
1956	995	+5.5%

Year	Pop.	±%
1961	1,044	+4.9%
1966	939	−10.1%
1971	1,052	+12.0%
1976	1,094	+4.0%
1981	1,109	+1.4%
1986	1,072	−3.3%
1991	1,141	+6.4%

Year	Pop.	±%
1996	1,098	−3.8%
2001	1,040	−5.3%
2006	1,069	+2.8%
2011	1,049	−1.9%
2016	1,114	+6.2%
2021	1,101	−1.2%

Source: Statistics Canada

Mother tongue (2021):

- English as first language: 95.0%
- French as first language: 1.8%
- English and French as first languages: 0.9%
- Other as first language: 2.3%

== Attractions and activities ==
South River is the access point for another tourist attraction: dog sledding on the North Algonquin Dog Sled Trail. Park permits are required.

A popular swimming spot is Eagle Lake Narrows, which is served by a general store that rents canoes. The Hockey Opportunity Camp, for boys and girls from 7 – 16 years old, is also on Eagle Lake.

The Swift Canoe and Kayak Factory has been in South River since 1989. It employs about twenty people. In the summer, Swift canoes are for sale next to the Tourist Information centre. There are many locations for freshwater fishing for smallmouth bass, whitefish, pickerel, rainbow trout, speckled trout, brook trout, lake trout, splake, ling perch and smelt.

There is a golf course, the Eagle Lake Golf and Country Club, originally built on the Erven farm in 1976 by Lyle Thorne, and then purchased in 1977 by his cousin Ronald Thorne. The golf course was then purchased by the St. Onge family in 1986. which after decades as a nine-hole course, it began expanding. In 2019 adding two more holes, bringing it to a 12-hole course.

The town has a public library.

== Transportation ==
The major form of transportation in South River is motorized vehicles. Highway 11 formerly passed through the town. Highway 11 was re-routed when it was upgraded to a closed-access highway and now passes west of the town, with an overpass over Eagle Lake Road. Construction for the bypass started in 2007 and was completed about 2011.

South River is served by the Sundridge/South River Airpark, which is a small airport about three miles from the town.

The South River railway station was served by the Northlander six days per week until autumn 2012. Currently, South River is served by the Ontario Northland bus and the privately owned Northern Airport Passenger Service shuttle.
