= Machar, Ontario =

Machar
- Township (single-tier)
- Township of Machar
- Location within Southern Ontario
- Coordinates: 45°52′N 79°28′W
- Country: Canada
- Province: Ontario
- District: Parry Sound
- Incorporated: 1889

Government
  - Type: Township
  - Mayor: Lynda Carleton
  - Fed. riding: Parry Sound-Muskoka
  - Prov. riding: Parry Sound—Muskoka

Area
  - Land: 182.65 km^{2} (70.52 sq mi)

Population (2021)
  - Total: 969
  - Density: 5.3/km^{2} (14/sq mi)
- Time zone: UTC-5 (EST)
  - Summer (DST): UTC-4 (EDT)
- Postal Code: P0A
- Area codes: 705, 249
- Website: www.townshipofmachar.ca

Machar is a township in the Canadian province of Ontario.

Located in the Almaguin Highlands region of Parry Sound District, Machar surrounds but does not include the village of South River.

== Etymology ==
This township in Parry Sound District was named by Sir Oliver Mowat in 1875 after Rev. John Machar (1796-1863), a founder of the Presbyterian Church of Upper Canada in 1831 and of Queen's College (University) in 1841, where he served as principal from 1843 to 1853.

== Communities ==
- Bray Lake
- Eagle Lake
- King Lake
- Maecks Subdivision

== Demographics ==
In the 2021 Census of Population conducted by Statistics Canada, Machar had a population of 969 living in 459 of its 875 total private dwellings, a change of 9.9% from its 2016 population of 882. With a land area of 182.65 km^{2} (70.52 sq mi), it had a population density of 5.3/km^{2} (13.7/sq mi) in 2021.

Historical census populations – Machar, Ontario

Year	Pop.	±%
1901	608	—
1911	415	−31.7%
1921	436	+5.1%
1931	401	−8.0%
1941	358	−10.7%
1951	318	−11.2%
1956	318	+0.0%

Year	Pop.	±%
1961	358	+12.6%
1966	346	−3.4%
1971	447	+29.2%
1976	612	+36.9%
1981	678	+10.8%
1986	730	+7.7%
1991	827	+13.3%

Year	Pop.	±%
1996	835	+1.0%
2001	849	+1.7%
2006	866	+2.0%
2011	923	+6.6%
2016	882	−4.4%
2021	969	+9.9%

Source: Statistics Canada

== See also ==
- List of townships in Ontario
