= Central Ontario =

Secondary region of Ontario, Canada

Coordinates: 44°N 79°W

- Secondary region
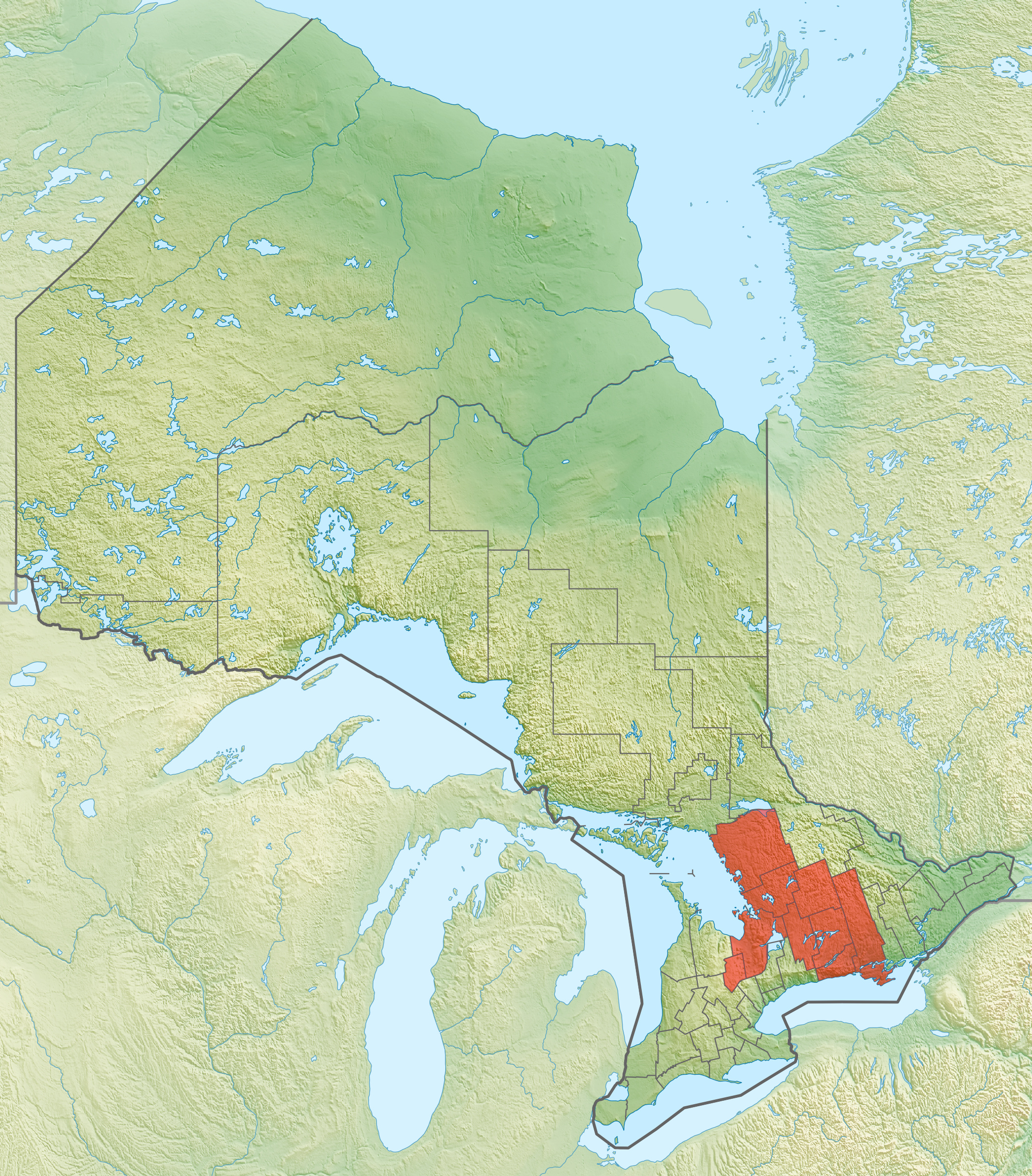
- Country: Canada
- Province: Ontario

Area
  - Total: 39,814 km^{2} (15,372 sq mi)

Population (Canada 2016 Census)
  - Total: 1,123,307
  - Density: 28.214/km^{2} (73.074/sq mi)
- Demonym: Central Ontarian
- Time zone: UTC−5 (EST)
  - Summer (DST): UTC−4 (EDT)
- Postal code prefixes: K, L, M, N
- Area codes: 519/226, 905/289, 613/343, 705

Central Ontario is a secondary region of Southern Ontario in the Canadian province of Ontario that lies between Georgian Bay and the eastern end of Lake Ontario.

The population of the region was 1,123,307 in 2016; however, this number does not include large numbers of seasonal cottage country residents, which at peak times of the year swell its population to well in excess of 1.5 million. Although it contains many small and medium-sized urban centres, much of Central Ontario is covered by farms, lakes (with freshwater beaches), rivers or sparsely populated forested land on the southern edge of the Canadian Shield.

== Definitions ==
Central Ontario is located within the primary region of Southern Ontario, which places it geographically in the south-central part of the province. Although most of the census divisions (which in Ontario take the form of counties, regional and district municipalities, territorial districts, and some cities) in the south-central tier of the province are commonly grouped as a distinct secondary provincial region, nearly all of them have affiliations or orientations towards other primary or secondary provincial regions to the north, south, and east.

The Parry Sound territorial or judicial district and Muskoka district municipality are geographically within Central Ontario but are administered as part of the primary region of Northern Ontario by federal economic development programs because of these districts' special economic circumstances. Parry Sound, but not Muskoka, is also classed administratively with an extended primary Northern Ontario region by the provincial government for reasons similar to those at the federal level. The southern part of the territorial or judicial district of Nipissing lies in Central Ontario which extends geographically as far north as the Mattawa River. However like Muskoka and Parry Sound, all of Nipissing is treated administratively as part of Northern Ontario.

Grey and Bruce counties may on occasion be included with Central Ontario as they are near or north of 44 degrees latitude, but are far more often treated as part of Southwestern Ontario. They are also part of the Georgian Triangle area, which includes parts of both Central and Southwestern Ontario. Further east at about the same latitude, Simcoe, Peterborough, and Northumberland counties and the City of Kawartha Lakes also have a southward orientation as part of the Greater Golden Horseshoe region centre around the west end of Lake Ontario.

Even further east, Hastings County and Prince Edward County may be considered part of Central Ontario by different sources but are more often included with the secondary region of Eastern Ontario, mostly because they share the same telephone area codes (613 and 343), have better transportation links to this region, and are part of the coverage area of Kingston-area media. This leaves Haliburton County as the only census division in Central Ontario that has no affiliations with any other secondary provincial regions of Ontario.

== Geography ==
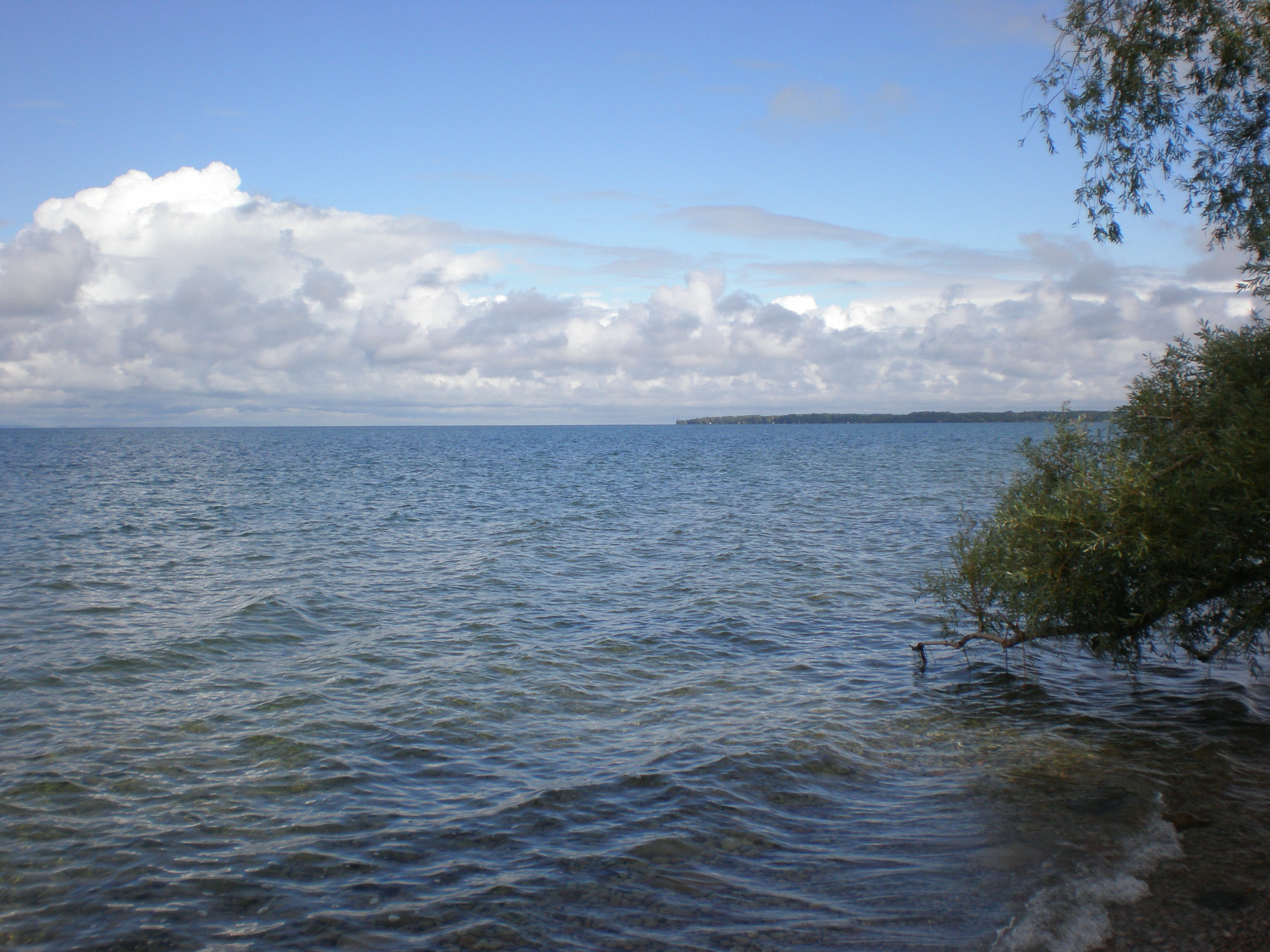
Lake Simcoe

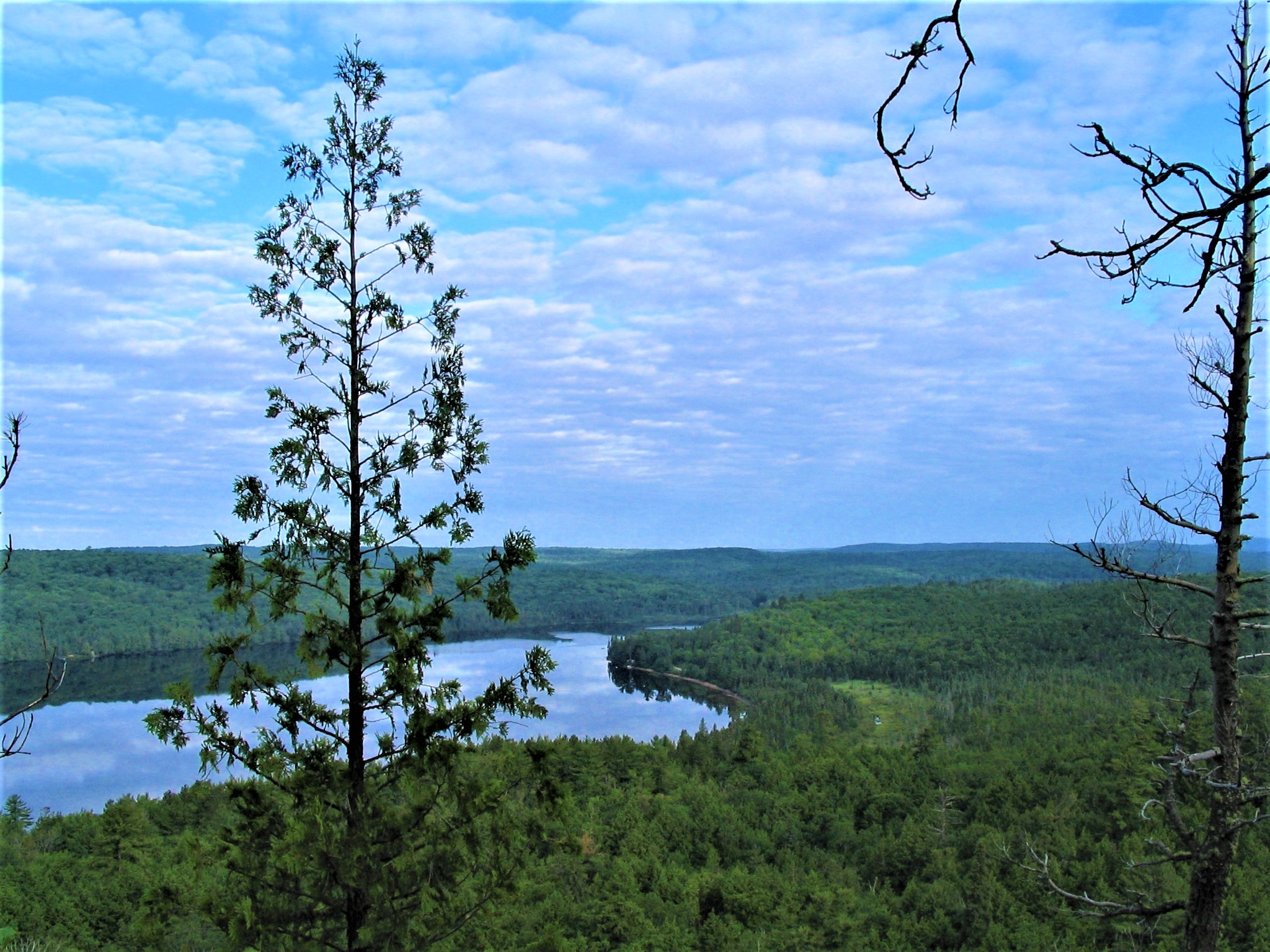
Algonquin Provincial Park

The Canadian Shield runs over the northern part of Central Ontario, a recreational area with a much-increased summer-time population, including the wilderness of Algonquin Provincial Park. Often referred to as 'Cottage Country', this area's lakes and rivers are dotted with numerous cottages, some of them seasonal, but in recent years there is a growing trend for some of these 'summer cottages' to be used as year-round residences due to a number of factors, abundance of outdoor recreation, baby-boom retiree population, increased local services and improved wireless communication.

The Trent-Severn Waterway, constructed over many years in the mid-19th century, spans Central Ontario via a series of boat locks, connecting Georgian Bay with Lake Ontario, entering the bay at Port Severn and Lake Ontario at the Trent River on the Bay of Quinte at Trenton (access to Lake Ontario also can be had by using the Murray Canal). Bypassing many rapids, this waterway is used by pleasure boaters and anglers during the summer months.

Along the northern edge of Central Ontario, are some of the highest elevations in Southern Ontario. These highlands are known as the Opeongo Hills, and they stretch into portions of Eastern Ontario as well.

== Climate ==
The climate of this area is a humid continental climate with large seasonal variation moderated somewhat by the Great Lakes. Summers are warm and humid (sometimes hot) but are shorter than further south with generally cooler nights. Winters are cold with significant snowfalls; some snowbelt areas receive an average of over 300 cm (120 in) per year. Severe summer storms are also commonplace, particularly in Simcoe County which for Ontario has a high tornado prevalence and was the site of the infamous Barrie Tornado in 1985.

== Administrative divisions ==
=== Single-tier municipalities ===
- Kawartha Lakes
- Prince Edward County

=== Separated municipalities ===
- City of Barrie
- City of Belleville
- City of Orillia
- City of Peterborough
- City of Quinte West

=== Districts ===
- Parry Sound District

=== Regional municipalities ===
- District Municipality of Muskoka

=== Counties ===
- Dufferin County
- Haliburton County
- Hastings County
- Northumberland County
- Peterborough County
- Simcoe County
