= Parry Sound District =

- District
- Location of Parry Sound District in Ontario
- Coordinates: 45°42′N 79°50′W
- Country: Canada
- Province: Ontario
- Region: Northern Ontario and Central Ontario
- Created: 1870

Government
  - MPs: Scott Aitchison, Pauline Rochefort
  - MPPs: Graydon Smith, Vic Fedeli

Area
  - Land: 9,113.92 km^{2} (3,518.90 sq mi)

Population (2021)
  - Total: 46,909
  - Density: 5.1/km^{2} (13/sq mi)
- Time zone: UTC-5 (EST)
  - Summer (DST): UTC-4 (EDT)
- Postal code FSA: P0C, P0E, P0G, P0H, P2A
- Area code: 705
- Seat: Parry Sound

Parry Sound District is a census division of the Canadian province of Ontario. Its boundaries are District of Muskoka to the south, the Sudbury District to the north-northwest, the French River and Lake Nipissing in the north, Nipissing District and North Bay in the north and east and parts of Algonquin Park in the northeast.

It is geographically in Southern Ontario, but the Ontario and federal governments administer it as part of Northern Ontario. Like other census divisions in Northern Ontario, it does not have an incorporated county, regional municipality, or district municipality level of government but instead serves as a purely territorial division, like the other districts of Northern Ontario. Instead of an upper tier of municipal administration, all government services in the district are provided by the local municipalities or by the provincial government itself.

Some communities that are not part of any incorporated municipality are served by local services boards. The district is also included in the service areas of FedNor and the Northern Ontario Heritage Fund. Accordingly, in most administrative contexts, the division is grouped with the Northern Ontario region instead of Southern Ontario, which is mainly geographic.

Along with the neighbouring Muskoka and Haliburton regions, the Parry Sound District is considered part of Ontario's cottage country, which is geographically in the primary region of Southern Ontario and the secondary region of Central Ontario. The district is commonly divided into two subregions, West Parry Sound and East Parry Sound, the latter of which is often referred to as the Almaguin Highlands.

== Subdivisions ==
Communities within these subdivisions are added in parentheses.

Towns:

- Kearney
- Parry Sound
- Powassan

Townships:

- The Archipelago
- Armour
- Callander
- Carling
- Joly
- Machar
- Magnetawan
- McDougall
- McKellar
- McMurrich/Monteith
- Nipissing
- Perry
- Ryerson
- Seguin
- Strong
- Whitestone

Villages:

- Burk's Falls
- South River
- Sundridge

Unorganized areas:

- Centre (Restoule)
- North East

=== First Nations ===
Reserves:

- Dokis
- French River
- Henvey Inlet
- Magnetawan
- Naiscoutaing
- Shawanaga
- Wasauksing

== Original geographic townships ==
Status of geographic townships in Parry Sound District
Township	Unorganized	Incorporated	Annexed/Amalgamated
Armour		✓	
Bethune			Annexed by the Town of Kearney.
Blair	✓		
Brown	✓		
Burpee			Part of the Municipality of Whitestone.
Burton			Part of the Municipality of Whitestone.
Carling		✓	
Chapman			Part of the Municipality of Magnetawan.
Christie			Part of the Municipality of Seguin.
Conger			Part of the Municipality of the Archipelago, with a small part in the Municipality of Seguin.
Cowper			Part of the Municipality of the Archipelago.
Croft			Part of the Municipality of Whitestone, with a small part in the Municipality of Magnetawan.
East Mills	✓		
Ferguson			Annexed by McDougall Township.
Ferrie			Part of the Municipality of Whitestone.
Foley			Part of the Municipality of Seguin.
Gurd			Annexed by Nipissing Township.
Hagerman			Part of the Municipality of Whitestone.
Hardy	✓		
Harrison	✓ (part)		Most became part of the Municipality of the Archipelago.
Henvey	✓ (part)		Northern section was transferred to the Town of Killarney in Sudbury District.
Humphrey			Part of the Municipality of Seguin.
Joly		✓	
Laurier	✓		
Lount	✓		
Machar		✓	
McConkey	✓		
McDougall		✓	
McKellar		✓	
McKenzie			Part of the Municipality of Whitestone.
McMurrich			Part of the Township of McMurrich/Monteith.
Monteith			Western two-thirds became part of the Municipality of Seguin, while the eastern third became part of the Township of McMurrich/Monteith.
Mowat	✓ (part)		Part transferred to the Town of Killarney in Sudbury District
North Himsworth		✓	Now the Municipality of Callander.
Nipissing		✓	
Patterson	✓		
Perry		✓	
Pringle	✓		
Proudfoot			Annexed by the Town of Kearney.
Ryerson		✓	
Shawanaga	✓ (part)		Most became part of the Municipality of the Archipelago.
South Himsworth			Annexed by the Municipality of Powassan.
Spence	✓		
Strong		✓	
Wallbridge	✓		
Wilson	✓		

== History ==
The district falls under the Robinson-Huron Treaty in 1850. The Anishinaabeg/Anishinaabek - Ojibway, Odawa, and Potawatomi communities reside in the District of Parry Sound, which also encompasses the lands of the Wasauksing, Shawanaga, Magnetawan, Dokis, and Henvey Inlet First Nations.

During the early part of the 20th century, the area was a popular subject for the many scenic artworks of Tom Thomson and members of the Group of Seven.

=== Forest fire protection history ===
The Parry Sound Forest Fire District was founded by Ontario's former Department of Lands and Forests (now the MNR) in 1922 as one of 17 districts to help protect Ontario's forests from fire by early detection from fire towers. The headquarters for the district were housed in the town of Parry Sound. It was the central location for 21 fire tower lookouts, including the Parry Sound fire tower, which was erected in the same location as the modern lookout tower at 17 George Street. The other 20 towers in the district were: Pickerel River CPR, Byng Inlet, Still River, Pointe au Baril, Pakesley, Pickerel River CNR, Key Junction, Ardbeg, Spence, Go Home, Loring, Stormy Lake (Restoule), Nipissing, Boulter, Lount, Laurier, Strong, Proudfoot, Stisted and Draper. When a fire was spotted in the forest a tower man would get the degree bearings from his respective tower and radio back the information to headquarters. When one or more tower men from other towers in the area would also call in their bearings, the forest rangers at headquarters could get a 'triangulation' read and plot the exact location of the fire on their map. This way a team of forest firefighters could be dispatched as soon as possible to get the fire under control. In 1969 there remained only 4 actively staffed towers: Ardbeg, Go Home, Stormy Lake, and Boulter. These would all be phased out shortly after when aerial firefighting techniques were employed in the 1970s.

== Demographics ==
As a census division in the 2021 Census of Population conducted by Statistics Canada, the Parry Sound District had a population of 46,909 living in 20,848 of its 35,640 total private dwellings, a change of 9.5% from its 2016 population of 42,824. With a land area of 9,113.92 km^{2} (3,518.90 sq mi), it had a population density of 5.1/km^{2} (13.3/sq mi) in 2021.

Canada census – Parry Sound District community profile

	2021	2016	2011
Population	46,909 (+9.5% from 2016)	42,824 (+1.6% from 2011)	42,162 (3.0% from 2006)
Land area	9,113.92 km^{2} (3,518.90 sq mi)	9,326.48 km^{2} (3,600.97 sq mi)	9,322.80 km^{2} (3,599.55 sq mi)
Population density	5.1/km^{2} (13/sq mi)	4.6/km^{2} (12/sq mi)	4.5/km^{2} (12/sq mi)
Median age	55.2 (M: 55.2, F: 55.6)	52.6 (M: 52.3, F: 53.0)
Private dwellings	35,640 (total) 20,848 (occupied)	35,226 (total) 18,679 (occupied)	33,764 (total)
Median household income	$72,500	$60,251

References: 2021 2016 2011

Historical census populations – Parry Sound District

Year	Pop.	±%
1921	26,860	—
1931	25,900	−3.6%
1941	30,083	+16.2%
1951	27,371	−9.0%
1956	28,095	+2.6%
1961	29,632	+5.5%

Year	Pop.	±%
1966	28,335	−4.4%
1971	30,244	+6.7%
1976	32,654	+8.0%
1981	33,528	+2.7%
1986	33,828	+0.9%
1991	38,423	+13.6%

Year	Pop.	±%
1996	39,885	+3.8%
2001	39,665	−0.6%
2006	40,918	+3.2%
2011	42,162	+3.0%
2016	42,824	+1.6%
2021	46,909	+9.5%

Population counts are not adjusted for boundary changes.
Source: Statistics Canada

== See also ==
- Canadian census divisions
- Central Ontario
- Almaguin Highlands
- List of secondary schools in Ontario#Parry Sound District
