= List of schools in Parry Sound District =

This is a list of schools located in the Parry Sound District of Ontario.

English-language public education is run by the Near North District School Board. English-language Catholic education is run by the Nipissing-Parry Sound Catholic District School Board in the east and the Simcoe Muskoka Catholic District School Board in the west. French-language public education is run by the Conseil scolaire public du Nord-Est de l'Ontario. French-language Catholic education is run by the Conseil scolaire catholique MonAvenir.

== Elementary schools ==
=== English public ===
- Argyle Public School, Port Loring
- Britt Public School, Britt
- Evergreen Heights Education Centre, Perry
- Humphrey Public School, Seguin
- Land of Lakes Public School, Burk's Falls
- M. T. Davidson Public School, Callander
- Magnetawan Central School, Magnetawan
- Mapleridge Public School, Powassan
- McDougall Public School, McDougall
- Nobel Public School, Nobel
- Parry Sound Public School, Parry Sound
- South River Public School, South River
- South Shore Education Centre, Nipissing
- Sundridge Centennial Public School, Sundridge
- Whitestone Lake Central School, Dunchurch

=== English Catholic ===
- St. Gregory Catholic Elementary School, Powassan
- St. Peter the Apostle Catholic School, Parry Sound
- St. Theresa Catholic Elementary School, Callander

=== Other schools ===
- Otter Lake Christian School, Seguin
- Parry Sound Forest School, Parry Sound

== Secondary Schools ==
=== English public ===
- Almaguin Highlands Secondary School, Strong
- Parry Sound High School, Parry Sound

=== English private ===
- Rosseau Lake College, Rosseau

== Elementary and secondary schools ==
=== French public ===
- École publique aux Quatre-Vents, Parry Sound

== Universities and colleges ==
- Canadore College Parry Sound Campus, Parry Sound
