= Widdifield Secondary School =

Location
- 320 Ski Club Road; North Bay, Ontario, P1B 7R2; Canada; 46.33522°N 79.45043°W

Information
- School type: High school
- Founded: 1965
- Closed: 2020
- School board: Near North District School Board
- Superintendent: Roslyn Bowness
- Principal: Alison Herst Jackson
- Grades: 9-12+
- Enrollment: 734 (2016)
- Language: English, with French immersion program
- Colours: Red and royal blue
- Mascot: Wildcat Wade
- Team name: Widdifield Wildcats
- Website: www.nearnorthschools.ca/widdifield/

Widdifield Secondary School (WSS) was an English public high school in North Bay, Ontario, Canada. It was part of the Near North District School Board.

== Overview ==
The school was founded in 1965 and named after Joseph Henry Widdifield, a nineteenth-century physician and member of the Legislative Assembly of Ontario for York North. It had a capacity of 1,164 students and the active student body generally ranged from 900 to 1,000. Because of the extensive school zone, approximately 35–65% of students were bussed in. The school's motto was "Mens Quaerens in Corpore Sano," loosely meaning "an inquiring mind in a sound body" in Latin.

Widdifield was the first school in Canada to incorporate a Specialist High Skills Major (SHSM)— Arts and Culture certificate program. It later obtained SHSM programs in Construction, Environment, and Health and Wellness, as well as a fine arts magnet program called Arts Nipissing.

== Closure ==
In September 2017, the Near North District School Board voted to close Widdifield, citing the declining youth population of North Bay and insufficient funding to maintain all three city high schools under their jurisdiction. The decision was challenged by local parents and investigated by the Ontario Ombudsman, but eventually reaffirmed in a 2019 revote.

In January 2018, the school board announced that WSS would close in September 2019. In September 2018, they announced that the closure would be delayed by at least one year, due to difficulties securing increased government funding for the other two local schools.

Widdifield closed in June 2020 amid the COVID-19 pandemic. The students and special programs were distributed to North Bay's other English public schools: Chippewa Secondary School and West Ferris Secondary School.

== Post-closure ==
The Widdifield building has since lain dormant. In 2023, it was used as a filming location for the American movie Everything's Going to Be Great. On February 2 2024, the North Bay Nugget reported on a pair of businessmen who proposed a public–private partnership to convert the building into an athletic centre, but were struggling to gain an audience with the school board.

== Drama ==
Widdifield boasted a small theater and an extracurricular drama troupe called "The Company".

- International Thespian Society Festival: Numerous Widdifield productions travelled to the annual drama festival, which was held at the University of Nebraska–Lincoln during that time.
- Sears Ontario Drama Festival: Widdifield was a part of the drama festival for almost 50 years and won over 100 awards in the District, Regional and Provincial rounds.
- Widdifield was also the home of the school board's summer youth theatre program, Theatre Out Reach On Stage, which moved to West Ferris after the closure.

== Notable alumni ==
- Al McDonald, former mayor of North Bay
- Barbara Olmsted, Olympic bronze medalist in team kayaking at the 1984 Summer Games
- Steve Omischl, Canadian freestyle skier, competed in 3 Olympic Games and won 20 World Cup titles.
- Michael O'Shea, Canadian football coach and former player, head coach of the Winnipeg Blue Bombers in the Canadian Football League
- Mike Yeo, ice hockey coach and former player, assistant coach of the Ottawa Senators in the National Hockey League

== See also ==
- Education in Ontario
- List of secondary schools in Ontario
