= Ontario Highway 124 =

Ontario provincial highway

Highway 124
- Highway 124 highlighted in red

Route information
- Maintained by the Ministry of Transportation of Ontario
- Length: 91.2 km (56.7 mi)
- Existed: October 19, 1955–present

Major junctions
- West end: Highway 400 near Parry Sound
- East end: Highway 11 near South River

Location
- Country: Canada
- Province: Ontario

Highway system
- Ontario provincial highways; Current; Former; 400-series
← Highway 118	→ Highway 125

King's Highway 124, commonly known as Highway 124, is a provincially maintained highway in the Canadian province of Ontario. The highway connects Highway 400 in Parry Sound with Highway 11 in Sundridge, a distance of 91.2 km (56.7 mi), including a 15.4 km (9.6 mi) concurrency with Highway 520. It is one of several highways in Central Ontario to provide this connection through the Muskoka and Parry Sound region, and the northernmost provincial highway to do so south of Highway 17.

Travelling north then eastwards from Parry Sound, Highway 124 meets very few provincial routes between Highway 400 and Highway 11; only Highway 520 and Highway 510 intersect the route between the two. After passing through McDougall, Waubamik, McKellar, Fairholme and Dunchurch, the highways travels east through Ahmic Harbour, north of Magnetawan, and through to Sundridge.

Highway 124 was assumed by the Department of Highways (DHO), predecessor to the modern Ministry of Transportation (MTO) in 1955, around the same time that Highway 69 (today largely subsumed into Highway 400) was extended to Sudbury. While several realignments of the initial route were carried out between then and the end of the 1960s, the highway generally remained unchanged until 2011, when it was extended through Sundridge and South River due to the four-laning of Highway 11.

== Route description ==
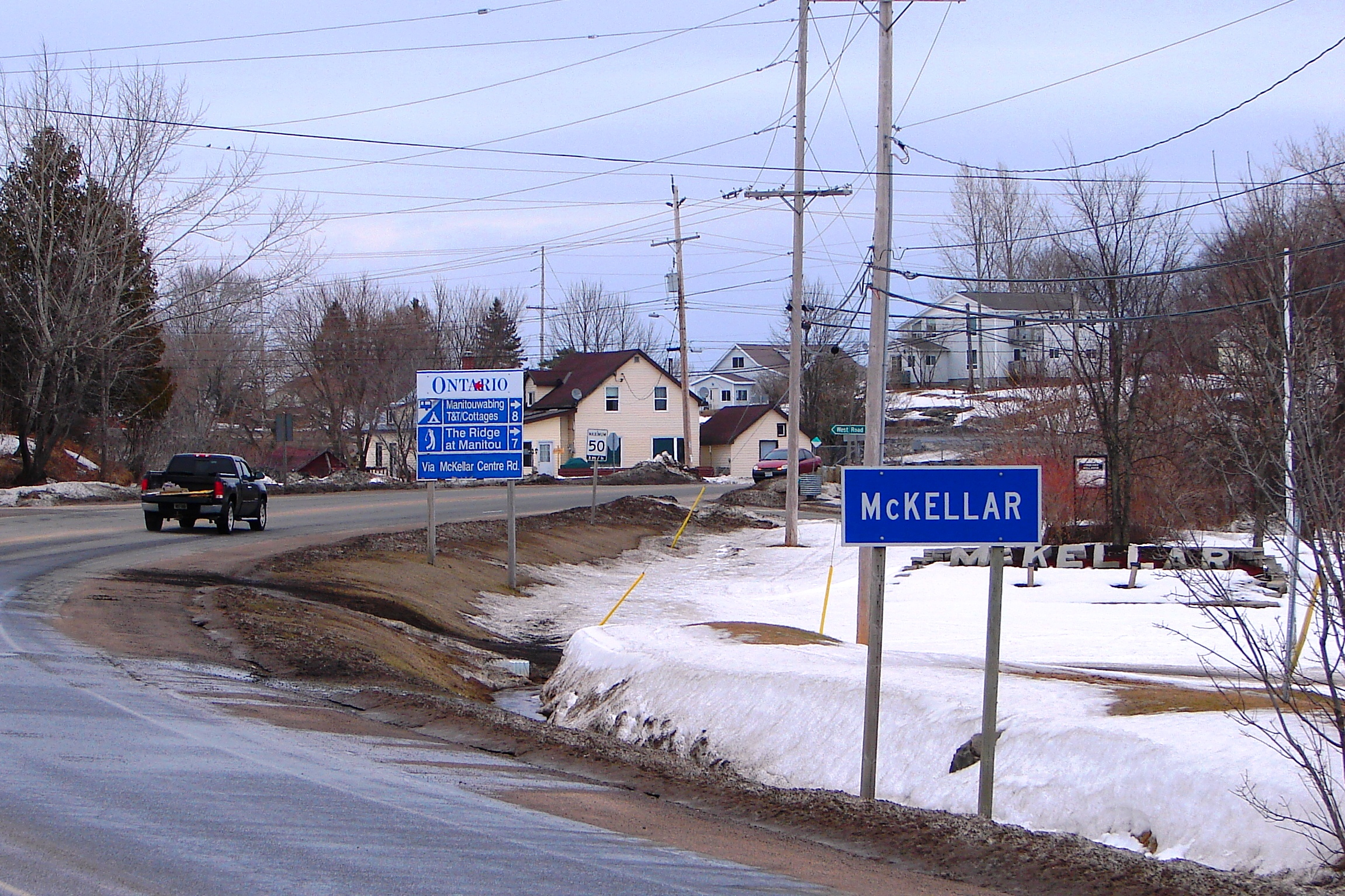
Highway 124 at McKellar

Highway 124 is one of several highways connecting the Highway 11 and Highway 400 corridors between Barrie and Highway 17. The route is generally lightly travelled, primarily serving local communities along the corridor. Besides Highway 520, only one other provincial highway, Highway 510, is encountered along the route. There are no large communities along the route between Parry Sound and Sundridge, however there are several small communities including Waubamik, McKellar, Dunchurch and Ahmic Harbour. The village of Magnetawan is also located a short distance south of the highway.

The route begins immediately north of Parry Sound at Exit 231 on Highway 400. From that interchange, the highway progresses northwards through the Municipality of McDougall, passing through the communities of Badger's Corners and Waubamik, where it encounters the Bunny Trail, before curving east and weaving around dozens of lakes. Curving north, the highway enters McKellar, then the Municipality of Whitestone. Within Whitestone, the highway wanders northeast through communities including Fairholme, Sunny Slope and Dunchurch before turning east and meeting Highway 520 near Whitestone Lake, which travels concurrently with Highway 124 for 15.4 km (9.6 mi). It also passes between two reserves: the Shawanaga Lake Provincial Conservation Reserve, which lies northwest of Sunny Slope, and the Ahmic Forest and Rock Barrens Provincial Conservation Reserve, which lies south of the highway as it passes from Whitestone into the Municipality of Magnetawan. The route wanders along the shore of Ahmic Lake, passing the community of Ahmic Harbour and later crossing the Magnetawan River immediately north of Knoepfli Falls.

The highway weaves through forests and exposed Canadian Shield as it travels eastward. North of the town of Magnetawan, Highway 520 departs to the south to pass through the community. Shortly thereafter, Highway 124 meets Highway 510 at the Nipissing Colonization Road. The route travels in a straight line due east for several kilometres, dipping south momentarily then entering the community of Pearcley. After this, the highway enters Strong Township. It passes through the community of Strong and continues generally eastward for several kilometres before encountering an interchange with Highway 11 (Exit 276). Continuing through Sundridge along the former route of Highway 11, Ontario Street, the route parallels a railway as it curves north before passing through South River. North of the town, it crosses and interchanges with Highway 11 (Exit 289), after which it parallels it to the west. Highway 124 ends at an interchange with Highway 11 (Exit 294) and Goreville Road.

== History ==
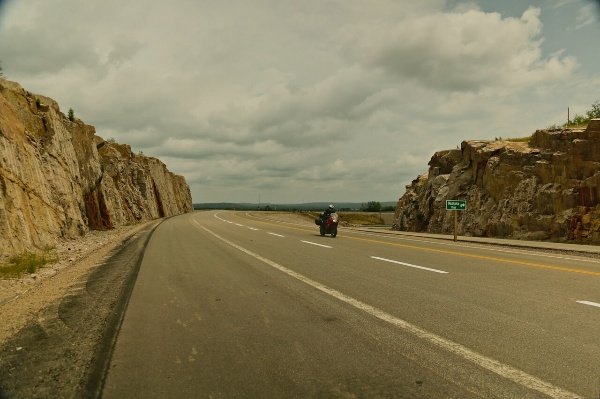
Highway 124 through Sundridge

Highway 124 was first assumed by the Department of Highways along existing roads on October 19, 1955, with a length of 79.4 km (49.3 mi). The 1956 Ontario Road Map indicates that it originally began at Highway 69 in downtown Parry Sound and followed present-day North Road to Badger's Corners where it joined the modern route. The following year shows it realigned along Municipal Drive and Hoddy's Side Road, bypassing north of the town. The highway was paved between Parry Sound and McKellar as well as between the Nipissing Road (Highway 510) and Sundridge when it was established; the remaining central section was gravel-surfaced.

Various improvements were undertaken on Highway 124 throughout the 1960s. In 1960, the route was paved between McKellar and Fairholme and a short bypass of Ahmic Harbour was opened. The highway was realigned for 3.0 km (1.9 mi) east of the Magnetawan River and paved between there and the Nipissing Road in 1962. The following year it was paved between the Magnetawan River and Dunchurch. The final gravel segment between Fairholme and Dunchurch was paved in 1965. In 1969, the western terminus of the highway was realigned onto the present route. These revisions reduced the length of Highway 124 to 76.1 km (47.3 mi) and established a route that would remain unchanged until the early 1990s. In August 2006, work began on the Sundridge–South River bypass of Highway 11, as part of the four-laning of that route between Huntsville and North Bay. The work involved constructing interchanges and a new alignment of Highway 11 west of the existing highway, and was completed in September 2011. Consequently, the former 16.2 km (10.1 mi) alignment through Sundridge and South River was redesignated as part of Highway 124.

== Major intersections ==
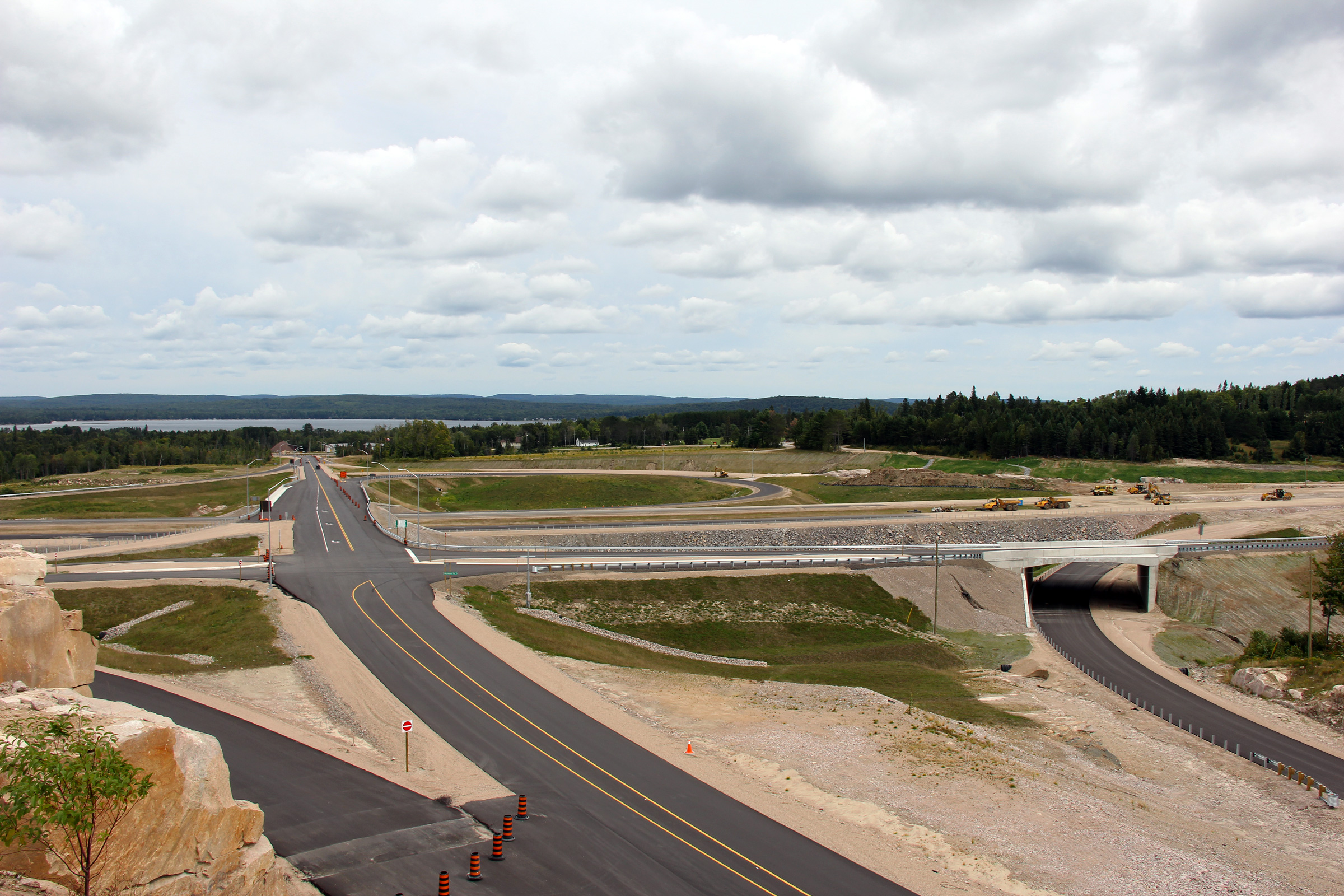
Highway 124 facing east at the still-under construction Highway 11 interchange in 2011.

The following table lists the major junctions along Highway 124, as noted by the Ministry of Transportation of Ontario. The entire route is located in Parry Sound District.

Location	km	mi	Destinations	Notes
McDougall	−2.6	−1.6	Nobel Road / Parry Sound Drive – Parry Sound	Former western terminus; formerly Highway 69
McDougall	0.0	0.0	Highway 400 / TCH – Sudbury, Toronto	Highway 400 exit 231; formerly Highway 69
McDougall	1.8	1.1	Burnside Bridge Road	Badger's Corners
McDougall	10.2	6.3	Hurdville Road	Waubamik
McKellar	19.2	11.9	McKellar Centre Road	
Whitestone	37.6	23.4	Highway 520 north – Maple Island, Ardbeg	Western end of Highway 520 concurrency
Magnetawan	53.0	32.9	Highway 520 south – Burk's Falls	Eastern end of Highway 520 concurrency
Magnetawan	54.9	34.1	Highway 510 south	Nipissing Colonization Road
Strong	75.0	46.6	Highway 11 – Toronto, North Bay	Highway 11 exit 276; beginning of former Highway 11 alignment
Sundridge	76.4	47.5	Main Street / Albert Street	
South River	86.1	53.5	Ottawa Avenue	
Machar	91.2	56.7	Highway 11 – Toronto, North Bay	Highway 11 exit 289
Unorganized North East Parry Sound	96.3	59.8	Highway 11 – Toronto, North Bay; Goreville Road	Highway 11 exit 294; end of former Highway 11 alignment
1.000 mi = 1.609 km; 1.000 km = 0.621 mi: Closed/former; Concurrency terminus
