= Ontario Highway 520 =

Ontario provincial highway

Highway 520

Route information
- Maintained by the Ministry of Transportation of Ontario
- Length: 67.9 km (42.2 mi)

Major junctions
- West end: Clear Lake Road in Ardbeg
- Highway 124 – Dunchurch; Highway 510 – Magnetawan; Highway 11 – Burk's Falls
- East end: Highway 11 (Exit 257) at Burk's Falls

Location
- Country: Canada
- Province: Ontario

Highway system
- Ontario provincial highways; Current; Former; 400-series
| ← Highway 519 | → Highway 522 |

Secondary Highway 520, commonly referred to as Highway 520, is a provincially maintained highway in the Canadian province of Ontario. The highway is 67.9 kilometres (42.2 mi) in length, connecting several small communities in Parry Sound District with Highway 124 and Highway 11.

The highway links several remote First Nation hamlets to the major highway routes of the region. However, the only places of noteworthy size are the village of Magnetawan and the town of Burk's Falls. It is concurrent with Highway 124 for 15.4 kilometres (9.6 mi).

== Route description ==
Highway 520 begins in Ardbeg as a continuation of the local Clear Lake Road, and travels south then east about 500 metres (1,600 ft) to reach a level crossing of the Canadian National Railway (CN) line at Ardbeg flag stop. It continues east, then south through a sparsely populated region of the Canadian Shield, though providing access to several First Nation villages. Upon reaching Highway 124 at Dunchurch, the two routes travel east, concurrently, for 15.4 kilometres (9.6 mi). Highway 520 then branches to the south, meets Highway 510 and passes through the village of Magnetawan.

Southeast of Magnetawan, the highway winds along the northern shore of Cecebe Lake, bisecting several small communities en route. It enters the town of Burk's Falls, where it is known as Ryerson Centre Road. Passing beneath the Burk's Falls Bypass of Highway 11, Highway 520 parallels the Magnetawan River briefly then turns south onto Ontario Street, the former alignment of Highway 11. It crosses the river and travels through the centre of the town, meeting the bypass south of it. Highway 520 ends at an interchange with Highway 11, at Exit 257, south of Burk's Falls. The portion of Highway 520 from the intersection of Ontario Street south to the Burk's Falls town limits is maintained under a Connecting Link agreement.

== History ==
Highway 520 is one of many Secondary Highways assigned a route number in 1956. Prior to this time, the route was a numbered, but unposted Development Road maintained by the Department of Highways.

== Major intersections ==
The following table lists the major junctions along Highway 520, as noted by the Ministry of Transportation of Ontario. The entire route is located in Parry Sound District.

| Location | km | mi | Destinations | Notes |
|---|---|---|---|---|
| Ardbeg | 0.0 | 0.0 | 500 m (1,600 ft) east of railway crossing | Highway begins at the eastern terminus of the local Clear Lake Road |
| Dunchurch | 25.0 | 15.5 | Highway 124 west – Parry Sound | Beginning of concurrency with Highway 124 |
| Magnetawan | 40.4 | 25.1 | Highway 124 east – Sundridge | End of concurrency with Highway 124 |
| Magnetawan | 43.1 | 26.8 | Highway 510 | |
| Burk's Falls | 65.7 | 40.8 | Highway 7162 (Ontario Street) | Beginning of Burk's Falls Connecting Link |
| Burk's Falls | 66.7 | 41.4 | | End of Burk's Falls Connecting Link |
| Armour | 67.9 | 42.2 | Highway 11 – Huntsville, North Bay | Exit 257 |
1.000 mi = 1.609 km; 1.000 km = 0.621 mi
