= Ontario Highway 510 =

Ontario provincial highway

Highway 510

Route information
- Maintained by the Ministry of Transportation of Ontario
- Length: 2.8 km (1.7 mi)
- Existed: January 1956–present

Major junctions
- South end: Highway 520 in Magnetawan
- North end: Highway 124 – Parry Sound, Sundridge

Location
- Country: Canada
- Province: Ontario
- Districts: Parry Sound

Highway system
- Ontario provincial highways; Current; Former; 400-series
| ← Highway 505 | → Highway 516 |

Secondary Highway 510, commonly referred to as Highway 510, is a provincially maintained highway in the Canadian province of Ontario. The highway is 2.4 kilometres (1.5 mi) in length, connecting Highway 520 in Magnetawan with Highway 124. It was established in 1956, along with most of the secondary highway system in the province, and is little changed since then.

== Route description ==
Highway 510 is a short secondary highway in Parry Sound District which follows the Nipissing Colonization Road north from the village of Magnetawan to Highway 124. It is lightly travelled, with an average of 220 vehicles travelling it per day in 2016.

At its southern end the highway meets Highway 520, which also connects with Highway 124 to the northwest. It curves north between exposed rock formations and is promptly surrounded by forests. The undulating highway curves several times as it passes by the occasional residence or summer cottage. The route curves northeast to avoid a large muskeg. It curves northwest around the muskeg as Arrow Drive, an old alignment of the highway, diverges to the west. After passing back into the forest, it curves to the north. The route passes several grass fields and houses before ending at an intersection with Highway 124, 64 kilometres (40 mi) east of Parry Sound and 23 kilometres (14 mi) west of Sundridge. The old Nipissing Colonization Road continues north.

== History ==
Highway 510 is one of several dozen secondary highways designated at the beginning of 1956. The highway is little changed since it was designated, and was unaffected by highway downloading in the late-1990s.

== Major intersections ==
The following table lists the major junctions along Highway 510. The entirety of the highway is in Parry Sound District.

| Location | km | Destinations | Notes |
|---|---|---|---|
| Magnetawan | 0.0 | Highway 520 – Burk's Falls | |
| Magnetawan | 2.8 | Highway 124 – Parry Sound, Sundridge | |
1.000 mi = 1.609 km; 1.000 km = 0.621 mi
