= PSHS =

PSHS may refer to:

Schools in Canada

- Parry Sound High School, Parry Sound, Ontario

Schools in the United States

- Palm Springs High School, Palm Springs, California
- Papillion South High School, Papillion, Nebraska
- Parkersburg South High School, Parkersburg, West Virginia
- Pittsford Sutherland High School, Pittsford, New York
- Plainfield South High School, Plainfield, Illinois
- Plano Senior High School, Plano, Texas
- Plymouth South High School, Plymouth, Massachusetts
- Poland Seminary High School, Poland, Ohio

Schools in South Korea

- Poongsan High School, Andong

Schools in the Philippines

- Philippine Science High School (various campuses)
