= Almaguin Highlands Secondary School =

Location
- 21 Mountainview Road; South River (Strong), Ontario, P0A 1X0; Canada; 45.8186°N 79.3692°W

Information
- School type: Public English Secondary School
- Motto: This is Why We're Awesome
- Established: 1959
- School board: Near North District School Board
- Principal: Heather Hickey
- Grades: 9-12
- Enrollment: 650
- Average class size: 15-30
- Language: English
- Schedule: 2 Semester, Daily Period Tumble
- Hours in school day: 8:50-2:50
- Colours: dark green, black, & gold
- Mascot: Highlander
- Team name: Highlanders
- Newspaper: Almaguin Highlights
- Website: www.nearnorthschools.ca/almaguin/

Almaguin Highlands Secondary School (AHSS) is an English public high school located in Strong, Ontario between the towns of South River, Ontario and Sundridge, Ontario. The school is part of the Near North District School Board and is responsible for the education of students in grades 9–12 in the east side of the Parry Sound District (also known as the "Almaguin Highlands"), the school serves 19 small communities and townships.

Students and athletes at AHSS are known as Highlanders, and the school's colours are dark green, black, & gold.

Almaguin Highlands Secondary School was founded in 1959, and the new, currently used school building was opened in September 2011.

== History ==
=== The Old School ===
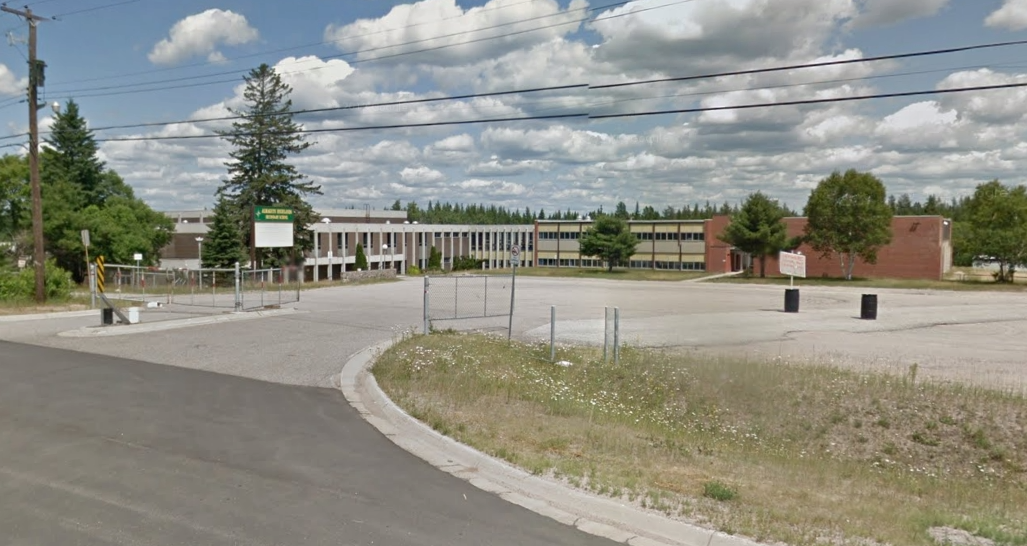
The Old AHSS, July 2012

AHSS (known then as Sundridge-South River Secondary School) was originally built to replace Sundridge High School, Sundridge and South River High School, South River. In the early 1960s the building underwent a giant expansion (bigger addition then the size of the original school) to become Almaguin Highlands Secondary School, this new school also eliminated the need of Burk's Falls High School, Burk's Falls and Powassan High School, Powassan. This new school had a reach from Nipissing in the north to Magnetawan in the West and Novar in the south, including all area between.

=== The New School ===
In the mid 2000s (Around the school's 50th Anniversary) planning for a replacement high school for the area arose. This was cause to the old school having problems with asbestos as well as the building becoming dated with many repairs and upgrades needed. With the help of a government grant the new building began construction in early 2010.

The new school was finished construction in September 2011, causing students to be delayed by one week starting the new school year. The new school is significantly smaller in size then the old school was (New buildings capacity around 850 where the old school could hold 2000+) When it opened the school was missing bleachers in the gym, slide out auditorium seats in the cafetorium (a combination room of the cafeteria and an auditorium), a soccer field, a running track, track & field jumping pits, and only a plywood deck on the stage. During the 2011–2012 school year fundraising allowed the building of the bleachers and auditorium seats. Due to having no field students during gym classes, home soccer games, and track & field still took place at the old school, leaving the students to be bused over to the old site. During the 2014–2015 school year the soccer field was constructed, ready for use in fall 2015. Over the 2015 summer break the stage deck was also replaced to proper decking. As of right now the school is still lacking a functioning running track and jumping pits, but students are no longer bused to the old school.

== Feeder Schools ==
AHSS is fed by the following feeder schools:

=== Full Feeder Schools ===
- Argyle Public School (K-8), Port Loring
- Evergreen Heights Education Centre (K-8), Emsdale (Perry)
- Land of Lakes Public School (K-8, 5-8 Extended French), Burk's Falls
- Magnetawan Central School (K-8), Magnetawan
- Mapleridge Public School (K-8), Powassan
- South River Public School (K-8), South River
- South Shore Education Centre (K-8), Nipissing
- Sundridge Centennial Public School (K-8), Sundridge

== Athletics ==
AHSS is a part of the Muskoka-Parry Sound(MPS) & Georgian Bay (GBSSA) athletic areas.

=== Fall Sports ===
- Junior Boys Soccer
- Senior Boys Soccer
- Junior Boys Volleyball
- Senior Boys Volleyball
- Midget Boys Cross Country
- Junior Boys Cross Country
- Senior Boys Cross Country
- Junior Girls Basketball
- Senior Girls Basketball
- Midget Girls Cross Country
- Junior Girls Cross Country
- Senior Girls Cross Country

=== Winter Sports ===
- Junior Boys Basketball
- Senior Boys Basketball
- Midget Boys Nordic Skiing
- Junior Boys Nordic Skiing
- Senior Boys Nordic Skiing
- Varsity Boys Ice Hockey
- Midget Girls Volleyball
- Junior Girls Volleyball
- Senior Girls Volleyball
- Midget Girls Nordic Skiing
- Junior Girls Nordic Skiing
- Senior Girls Nordic Skiing
- Varsity Girls Ice Hockey

=== Spring Sports ===
- Varsity Girls Soccer
- Co-Ed Track & Field
- Co-Ed Badminton

== Arts ==
=== Drama ===
AHSS offers drama programming in grades 9 through 12. It also offers advanced drama programing, as 'Play Production' courses at the 11th and 12th grade.

The AHSS Drama club, known as Tartan Theatre, produces 2-3 plays each school year, and participates in the National Theatre School Ontario Drama Festival (formerly Sears Ontario Drama Festival). It is part of the Nipissing District and Northern Region. Tartan Theatre has had multiple plays advance to the Provincial Showcase, most recently with Elephant's Graveyard in 2015. Other productions as part of provincial showcases include Lessons of Childhood (2013), Women of Troy (2010), Moon People (2003), and Salt Water Moon (1999).

In 2016 Tartan Theatre was selected to take part in the Southern Ontario Youth Theatre Festival (now Ontario Youth Theatre Festival) with The Comedian.

== Academics ==
=== Extended French Program ===
AHSS offers an Extended French Certificate Program where students can take intensive courses on the French language as well as content courses offered in French. Students in the program will graduate with an Extended French Certificate on their OSSD. It is not a bilingualism certification, but starting in 2017 students in their fourth year of the program can take the DELF French Language Test.

=== Specialist High Skills Majors ===
AHSS offers three Specialist High Skills Majors (SHSMs) which students can apply for in the tenth grade. They are Environment - Outdoor Education, Design and Technology, and Health and Wellness.

=== Dual Credits and Apprenticeships ===
AHSS offers many Dual Credits and Apprenticeships programs through Canadore College in which students can earn credits towards their OSSD and a college degree, diploma, or certificate. Typically, the dual credits program is paired with the COOP program.

== Notable alumni ==
- Peter Camani, artist and sculptor, retired art teacher, art is featured in the Vatican and Buckingham Palace. His creations, such as the Screaming Heads and Midlothian Castle & Gallery have been featured on many television shows.
- Hawksley Workman, rock singer-songwriter
- Jayson Stewart, teacher, actor https://www.imdb.com/name/nm5240415/bio/

== See also ==
- Education in Ontario
- List of secondary schools in Ontario
