= Mary Edgar =

Mary Edgar may refer to:

- Mary Susanne Edgar (1889–1973), Canadian writer
- Mary Edgar Mussi (1907–1991), British writer, who wrote as Mary Howard and Josephine Edgar
