= Mary Susanne Edgar =

Canadian author

Mary Susannah Edgar
- Born: May 23, 1889; Sundridge, Ontario, Canada
- Died: September 17, 1973 (aged 84); Toronto, Ontario, Canada
- Occupation: camp director

Mary Susannah Edgar was a Canadian author of several books, one-act plays and hymns, the most famous of them being God Who Touchest Earth with Beauty, which has been translated into several languages and placed in hymnals around the world.

== Biography ==
Mary Susannah Edgar was born in Sundridge, Ontario on May 23, 1889. She was the daughter of Joseph Edgar and Mary Little, from Sundridge, Ontario. Her schooling took her from Sundridge to Barrie High School and Havergal College, Toronto, Ontario.

In 1922, she opened a girls' camp near Sundridge on Lake Bernard, called Glen Bernard. Edgar continued as the camp's director until her retirement in 1956. Her life was devoted to working with girls and camping through many local, provincial and national organizations.

She was the author of many books, plays and hymns. One such hymn is "O God of All the Many Lands".

Edgar died on September 17, 1973.

== Works ==
=== Books ===
- Wood-fire and Candlelight (1945)
- Under Open Skies (1956)
- The Christmas Wreath of Verse (1967)
- Once there was a Camper (1970)
- A Magic Store (poem)
