= F. J. McElligott Secondary School =

Coordinates: 46.3164°N 78.7049°W

- 300 Pine Street, Mattawa, Ontario, Canada

Information
- Other name: F.J. McElligott Intermediate School
- Type: English public intermediate and secondary school
- Established: September 1969
- School board: Near North District School Board
- Grades: 7-12
- Enrollment: 170

F. J. McElligott Secondary School is an English public intermediate and secondary school located in Mattawa, Ontario. It is part of the Near North District School Board. As of 2024 the secondary school section had 115 students, and the intermediate school section had 55.

== History ==
F.J. McElligott Secondary School opened in September 1969 for high school aged students. In September 2012 the F.J. McElligott Intermediate School opened in the school, accepting middle school aged students.

== Programs ==
F.J. McElligott Secondary School has a French immersion program, along with a Specialist High Skills Major in Outdoor Education, and an accredited Hockey Canada skills course.
