= Peter Camani =

Canadian artist and sculptor

Coordinates: 45.5914336°N 79.5091001°W

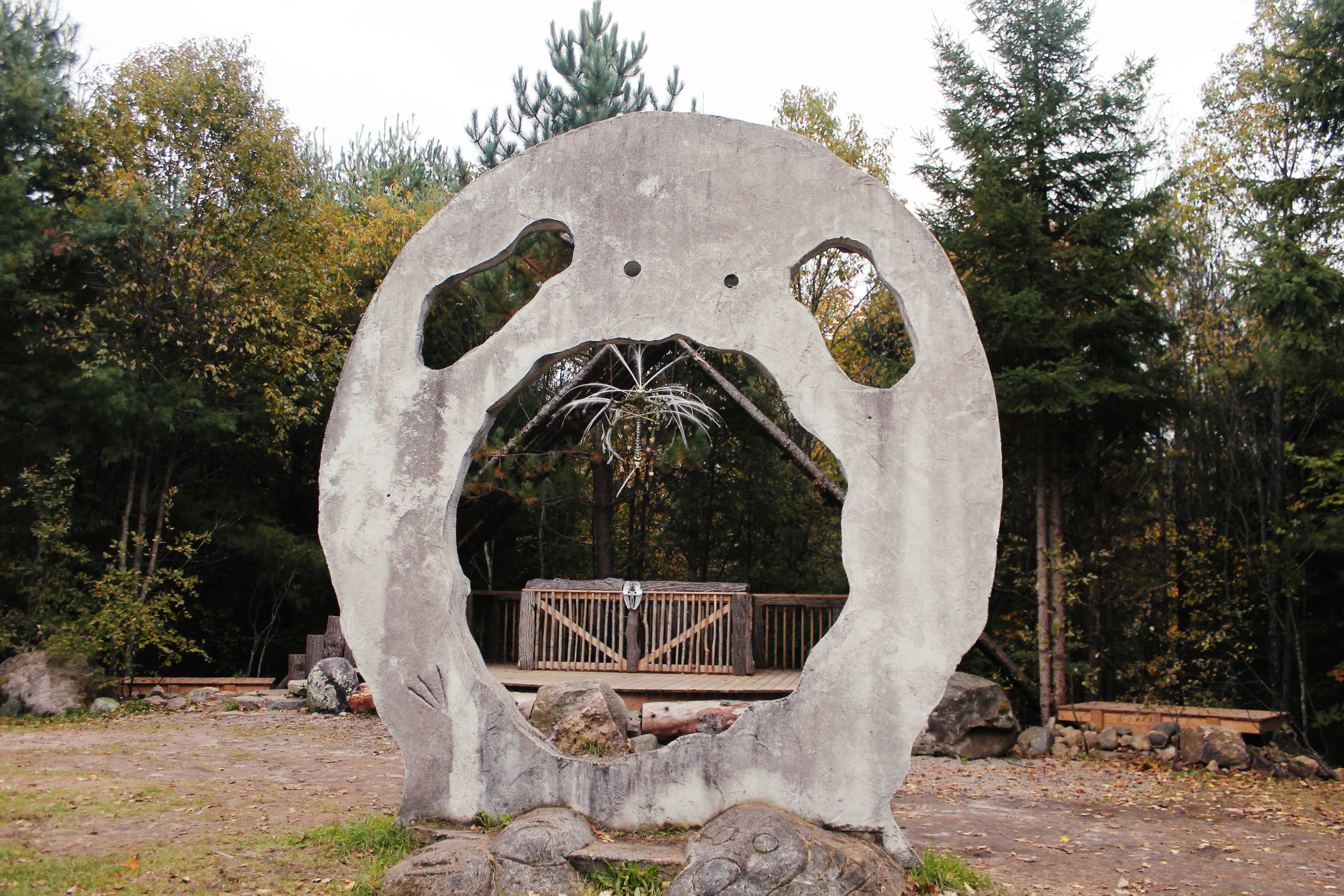
- a screaming head statue by Camani
- Occupations: Multimedia artist and sculptor
- Years active: 1980s - present
- Family: Ace Freeman, Carys Camani
- Website: Screaming Heads

Signature
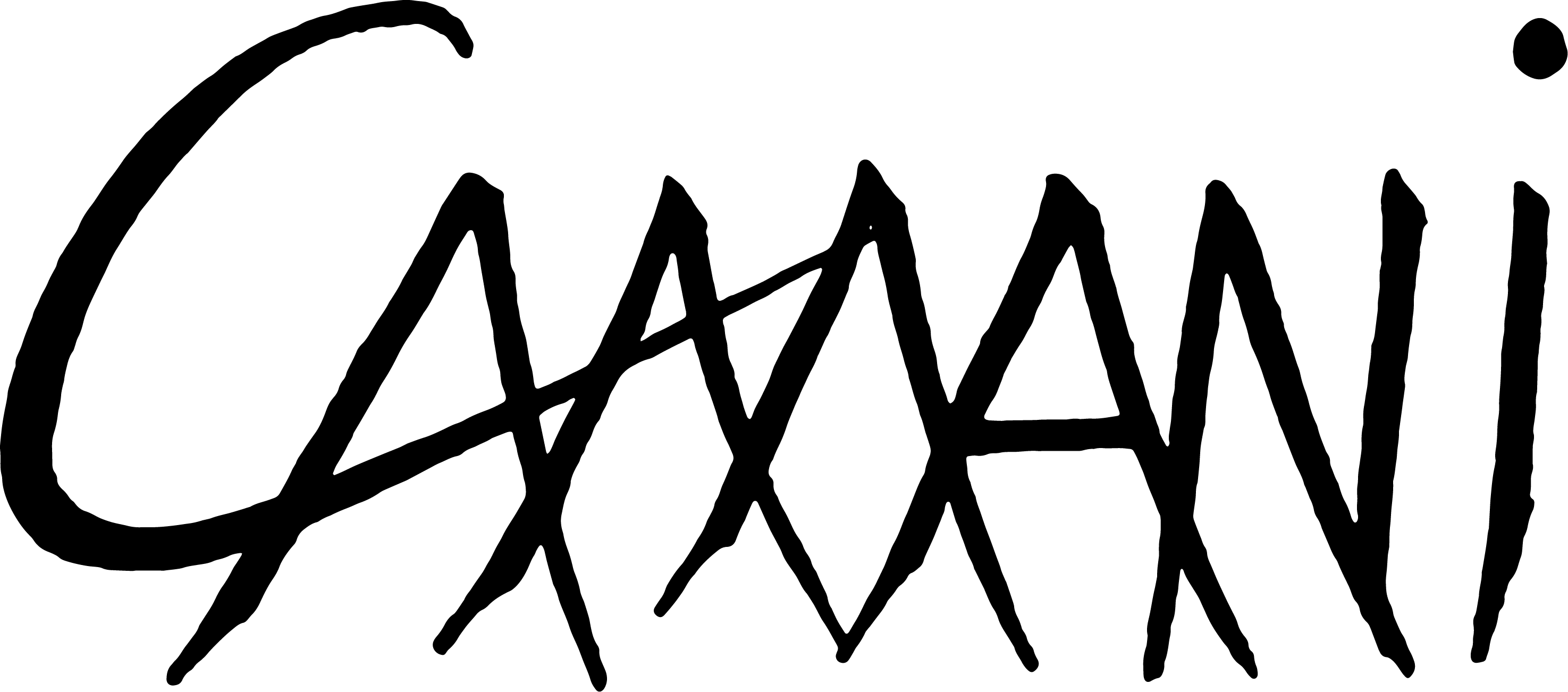

Peter Camani is a Canadian artist and sculptor who currently resides near Burk's Falls, Ontario. His property, the Midlothian Castle, is notable for being an expansive sculpture garden, featuring countless statues, structures, assemblage artworks and Camani's castle-like house. The location is commonly known as Screaming Heads.

== Biography ==
Peter Camani grew up in Hamilton, Ontario, and took interest in art at an early age. He attended the University of Waterloo in Sciences, but in his third year transferred from sciences to the arts. After graduating with a B.A., he went to Western University, later becoming an art teacher at Almaguin Highlands Secondary School in South River, Ontario. Camani began working on his property-wide art project around 1981. Retiring from teaching in 2008, he has continued his creative endeavours, the collection of art on his property ever expanding.

== Screaming Heads ==
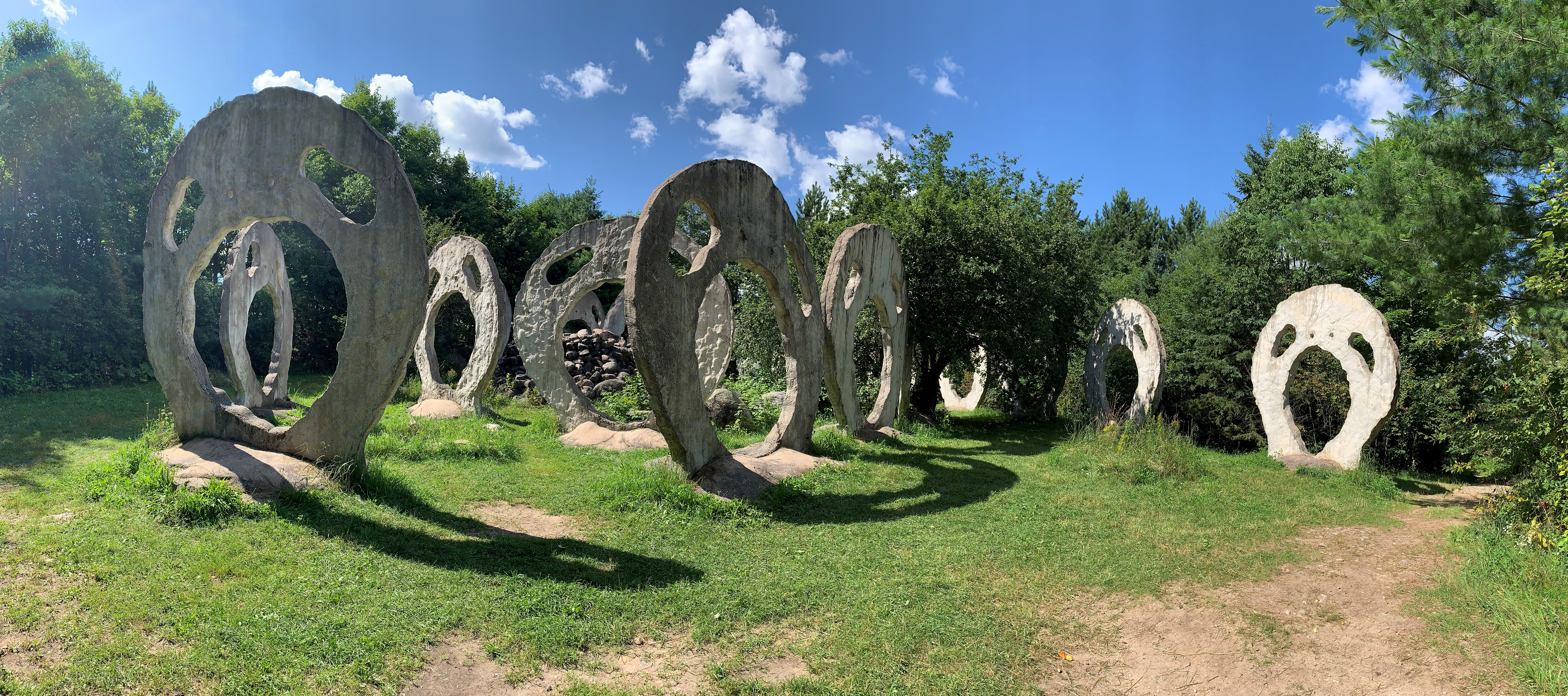
Inscriptions at their bases suggest these heads were constructed around 1998.

Peter Camani's Midlothian Castle, commonly known as Screaming Heads, is a public art installation featuring numerous sculptures, artworks and structures. The monolithic, 20 foot high concrete sculptures range from Munch-like screaming faces to hands, horses, and memorials.

Camani's home is a farm house converted into a castle, topped with a turret resembling a screaming face and a two-headed dragon sitting atop the chimney. Facing the road is a wall topped with busts of people reenacting the "see no evil, hear no evil, speak no evil" proverb, while facing the parking lot is a towering metal gate that resembles a spider web.

Camani is responsible for planting many of the trees on his property, which was once barren farmland, as well as propagating spring-fed ponds. The large concrete structures are arranged in such a way that they form the shape of a dragon when viewed from the air, although trees now obscure some of the statues. Camani has explained that his sculptures stand as a warning against environmental degradation, resembling "the earth rebelling against what we’re doing to the land."

Of the public's perception of his work, Camani has commented via his website;

The artist is aware of comment. His response takes shape in the four "No Evils" atop the walls, a message to those who would dismiss without comprehending. The transitory nature of comment is unable to withstand the permanence of the creations, the castings which will stand for centuries, perhaps giving pause to archaeologists or other visitors in subsequent millennia.

A small screaming head statue can also be found outside the Burk's Falls Welcome Centre.

=== Harvest Festival ===
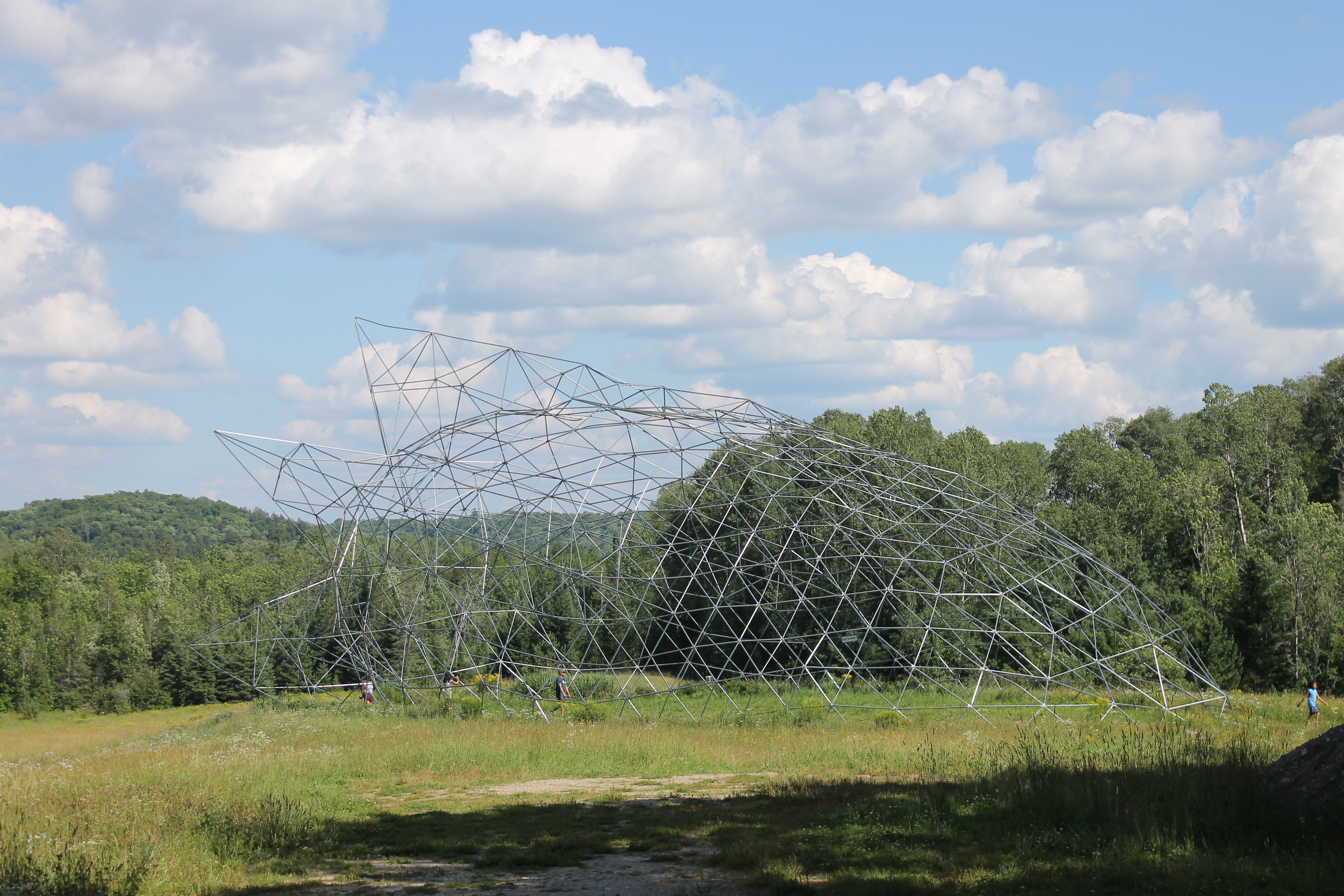
Crash, the largest of the steel structures built for the Harvest Festival.

Camani's grounds are the location of an annual Harvest Festival, a weekend-long event that takes place in mid September showcasing electronic dance musicians, DJs, and other activities.

The large, steel-frame structures on Camani's property were erected by festival organizers to serve as performance and eating venues. While these structures are left bare for most of the year, when covered with fabric they come to resemble a crashed spaceship, pyramids and domes.

=== Media appearances ===
Camani's castle has been featured several times on Canadian television, including the CBC series On The Road Again, Arthur Black's Weird Homes and more. Peter Camani was also the subject of the 1996 documentary Concrete Ambitions, a film which won two awards.

In 2011, Peter's house was featured in the first episode of MTV's Extreme Cribs.

== Film ==
In 2005, Peter Camani, in collaboration with director Dallas Boyes, began production on a fantasy film entitled Witch Way. The film was shot in Screaming Heads and the surrounding Burk's Falls area. Camani employed the help of students from Almaguin Highlands Secondary School, along with local musicians Paul Shillolo and Jeff Stamp. An Almaguin News article suggests editing for the film was completed sometime in 2008, with a trailer being shared via Camani's old website. However, for unknown reasons, it appears the film never saw a public release.

== Gallery ==
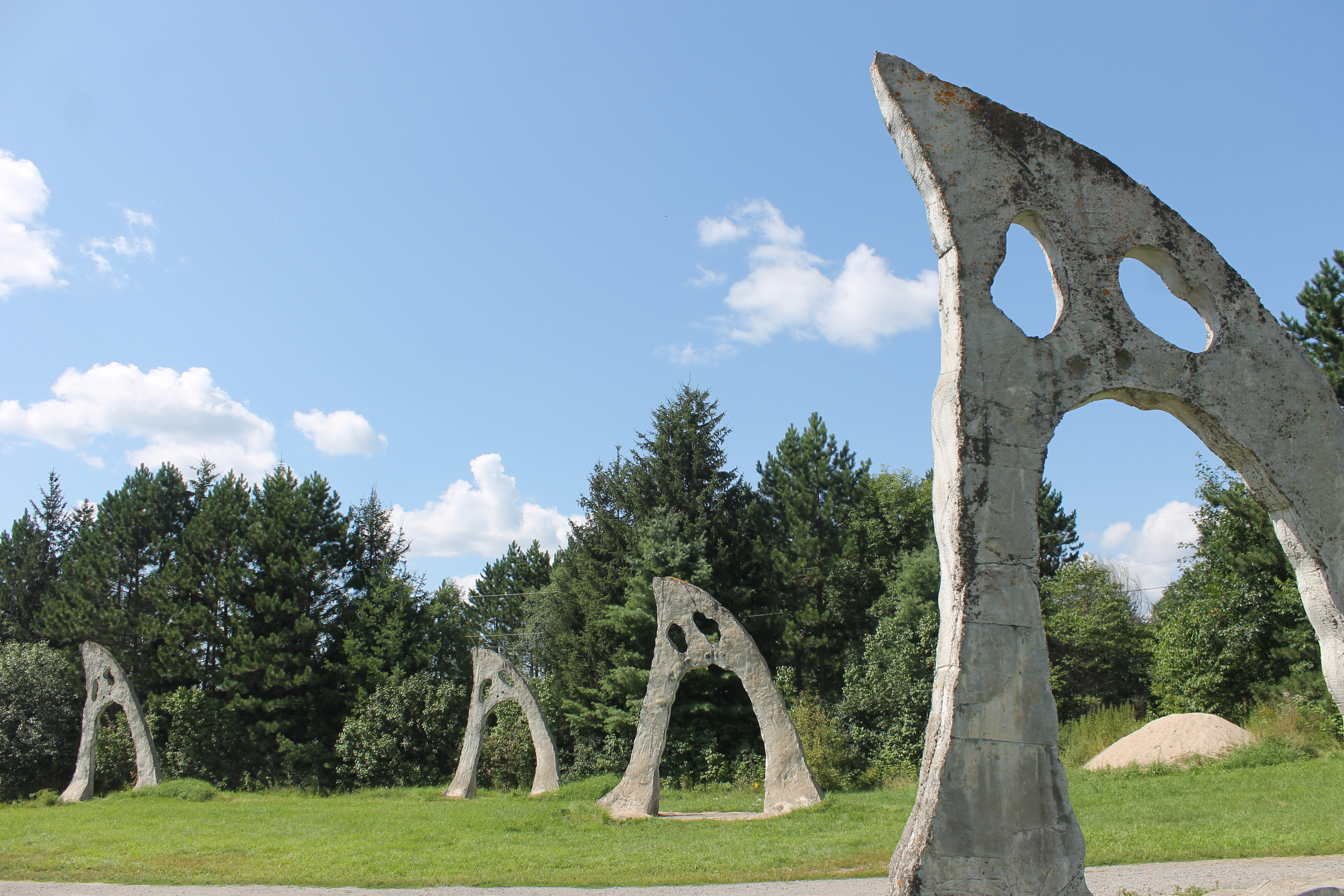

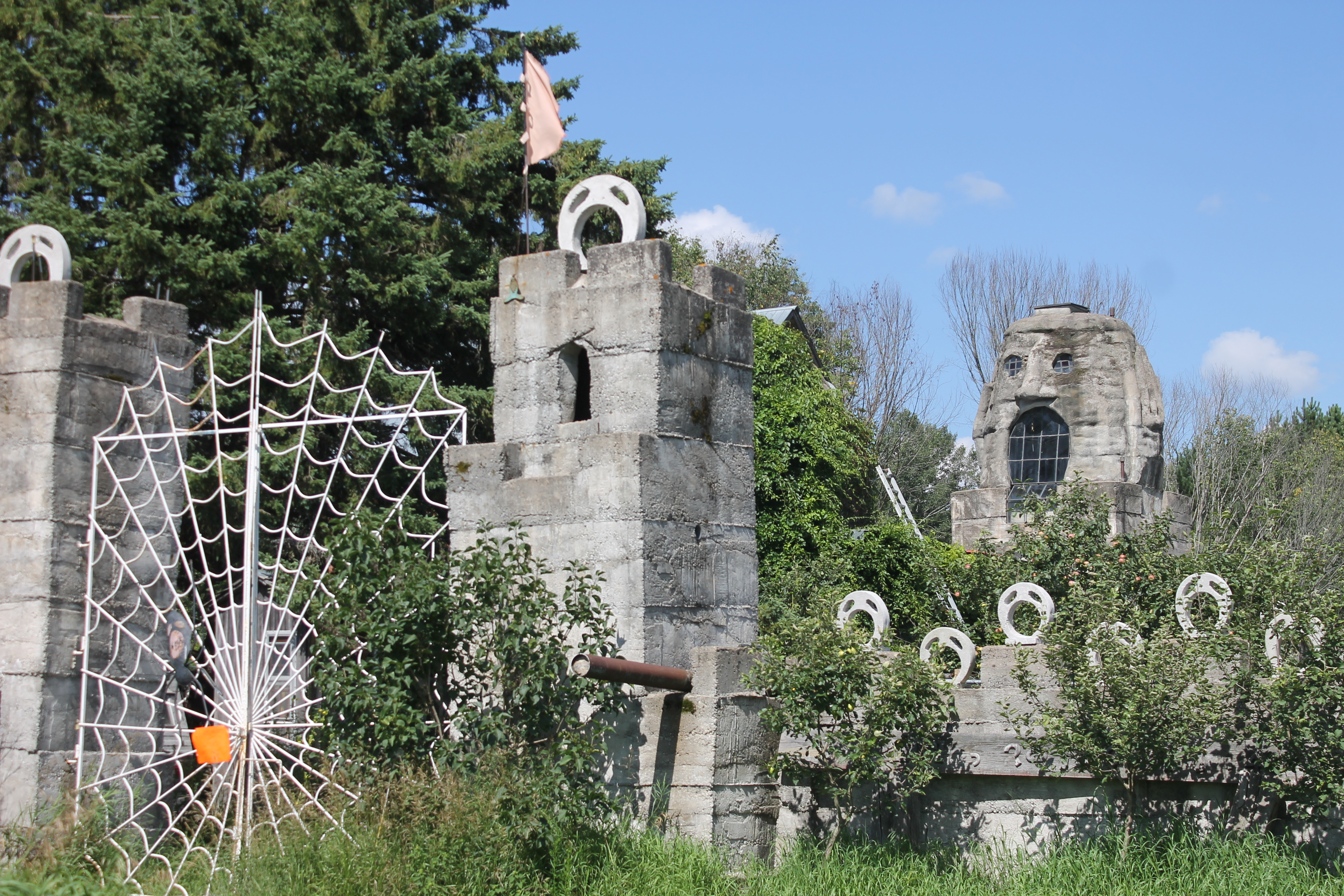
The gate to Peter Camani's property as seen from the parking lot.

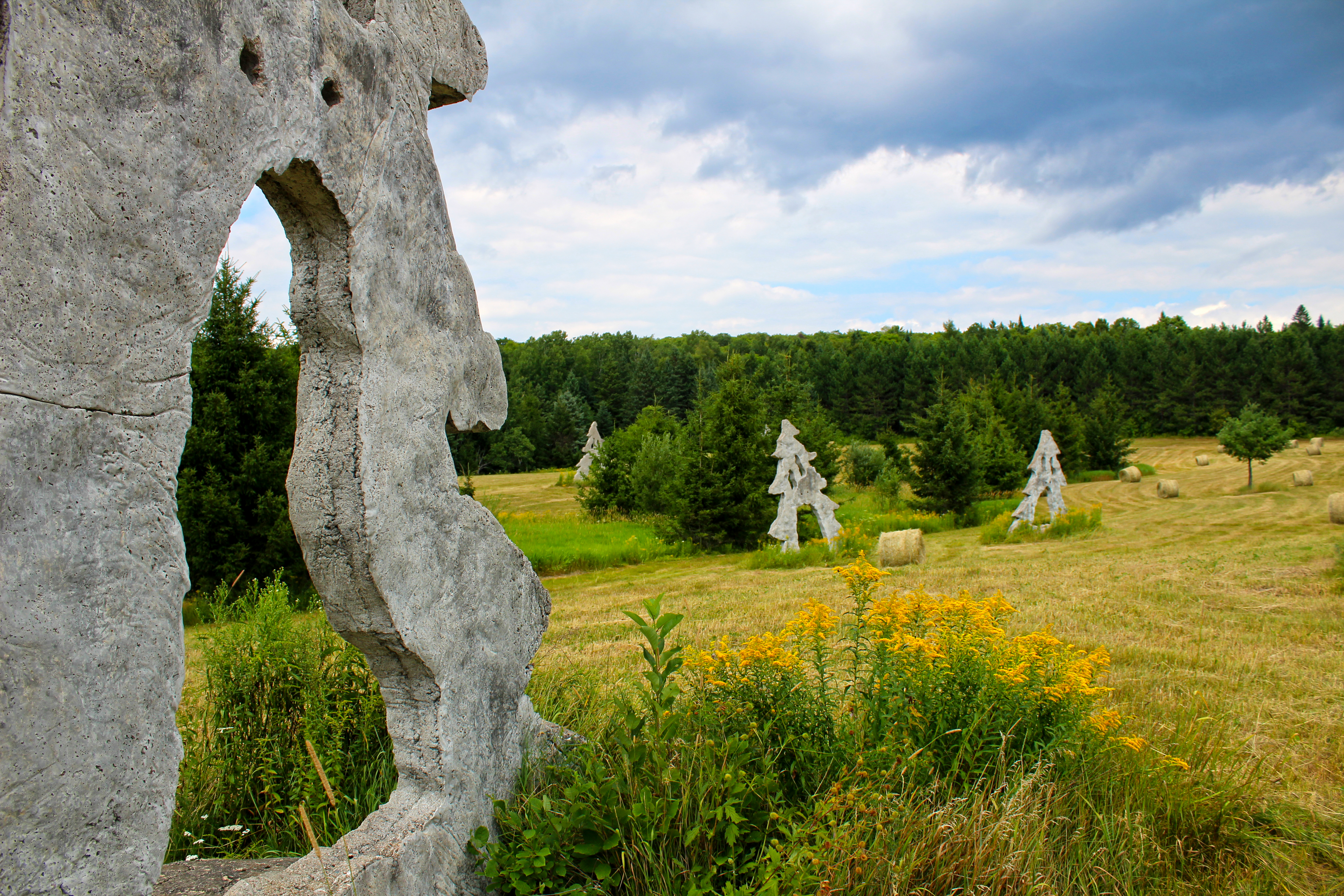

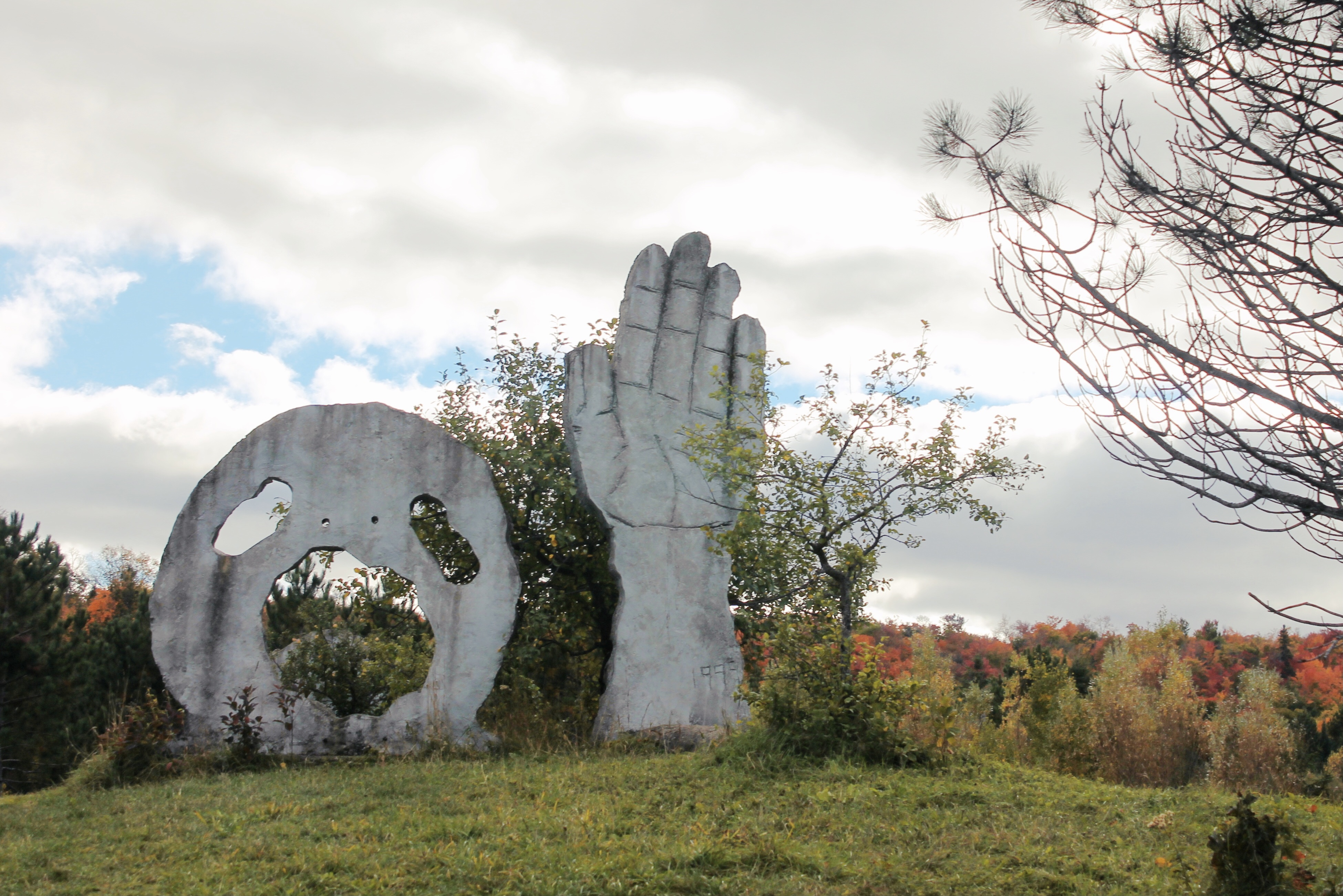
Some of the Screaming Head statues incorporate hands, while isolated hand statues can also be found on the property.

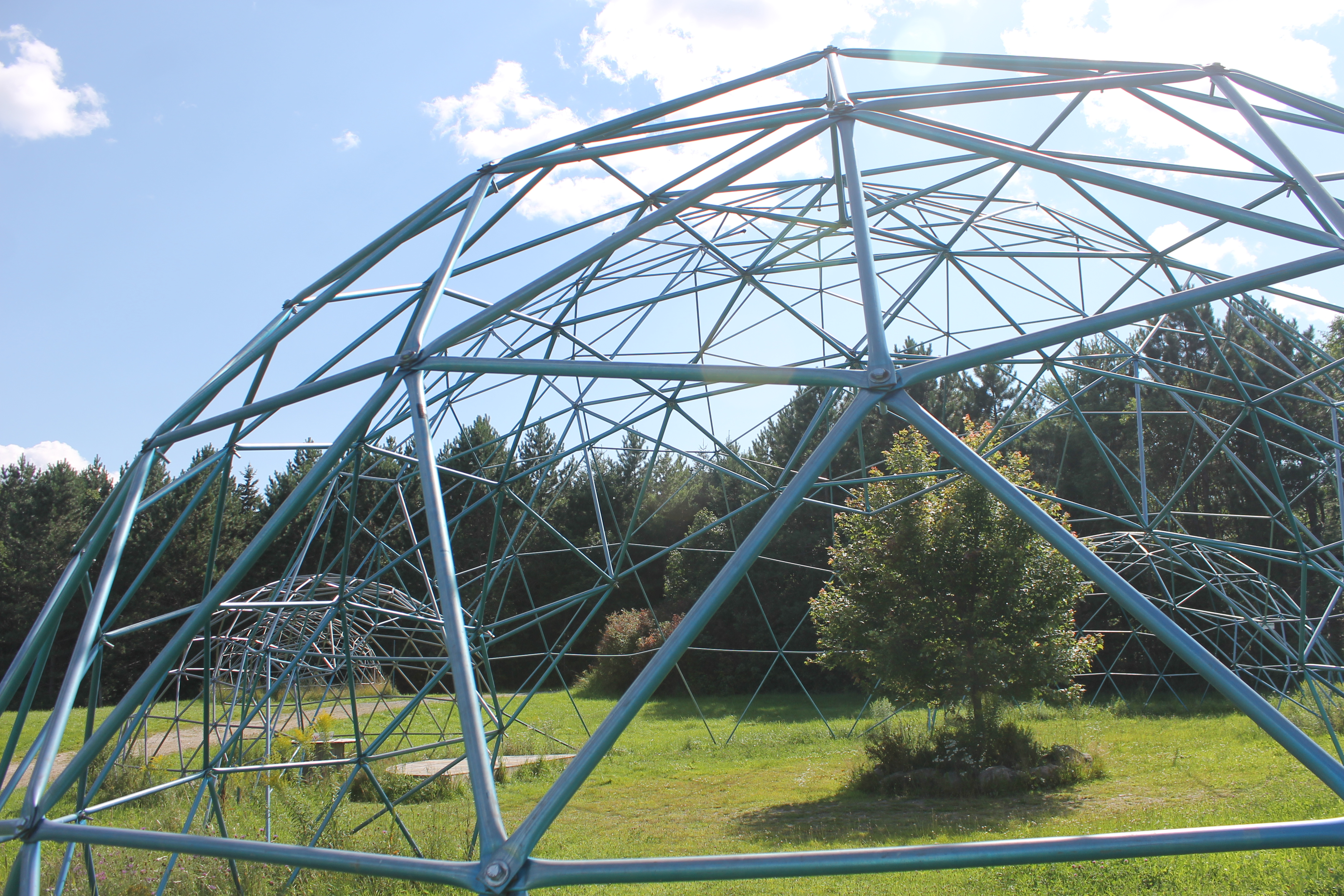

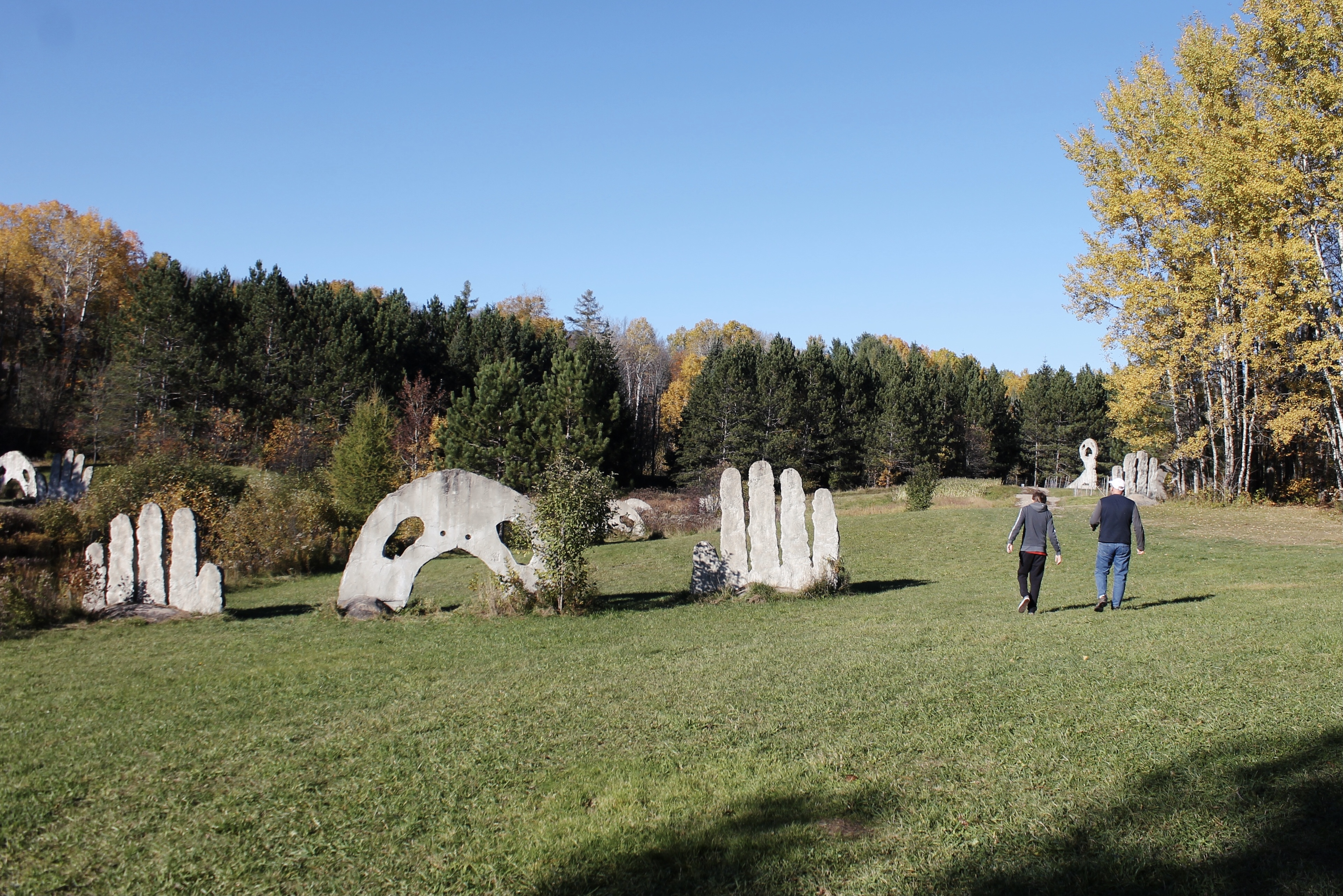

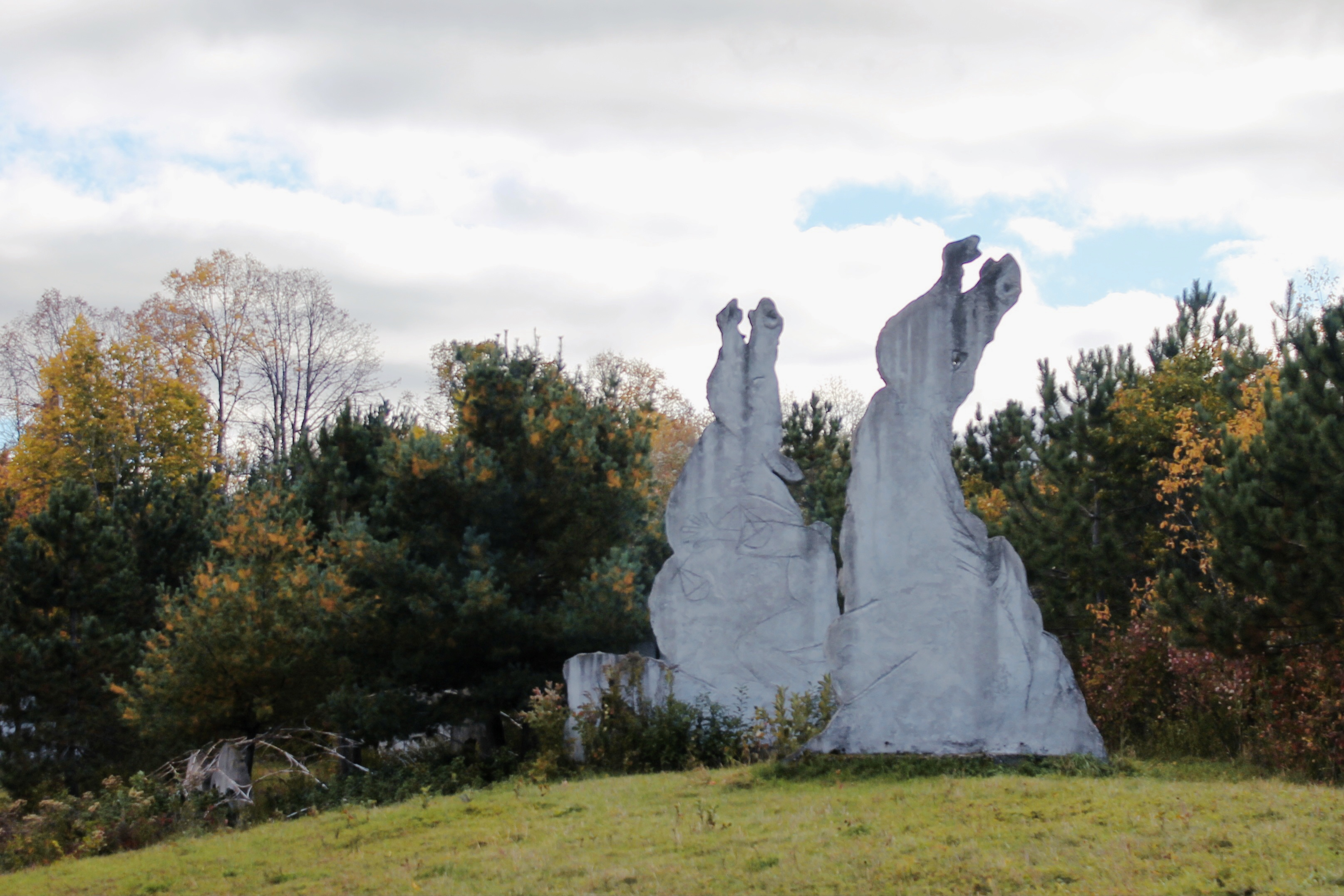
Horse statues found among the Screaming Heads
