= Shawanaga Lake =

Lake in Ontario, Canada

- Location within Ontario
- Location: Whitestone, Parry Sound District, Ontario
- Coordinates: 45°33′N 79°58′W
- Basin countries: Canada
- Surface area: 220 ha (540 acres)
- Average depth: 5.8 m (19 ft)
- Max. depth: 17.7 m (58 ft)
- Shore length^{1}: 23.7 km (14.7 mi)
- ^{1} Shore length is not a well-defined measure.

Shawanaga lake is a lake located in the Municipality of Whitestone, District of Parry Sound, Ontario, Canada.

It is a warm water lake with shoreline in Hagerman, Fergusson, and Burpee. Shawanaga lake has a long narrow shape and is heavily impacted by recreational boats. Shawanaga lake road runs along the north side of the lake, and is a seasonally-maintained road. The southern part of the lake, where the public boat launch is located, is accessible through Lorimer lake road.

Above Shawanaga lake lies Shawanaga Lake Conservation Reserve that encompasses a number of smaller lakes, such as Dunchurch lake, Boyd lake, De Volve lake, Blue lake, Snakeskin lake, Snake lake, Canning lake, Hobson lake, and Bell lake. The reserve consists of 4,937 hectares and is located in the geographic Townships of East Burpee and Hagerman, in the Municipality of Whitestone, of the Territorial District of Parry Sound.

Sport fishing species include yellow perch, rock bass, Northern Pike and Smallmouth Bass.

== See also ==
- List of lakes in Ontario
