= Northern Secondary School (Sturgeon Falls) =

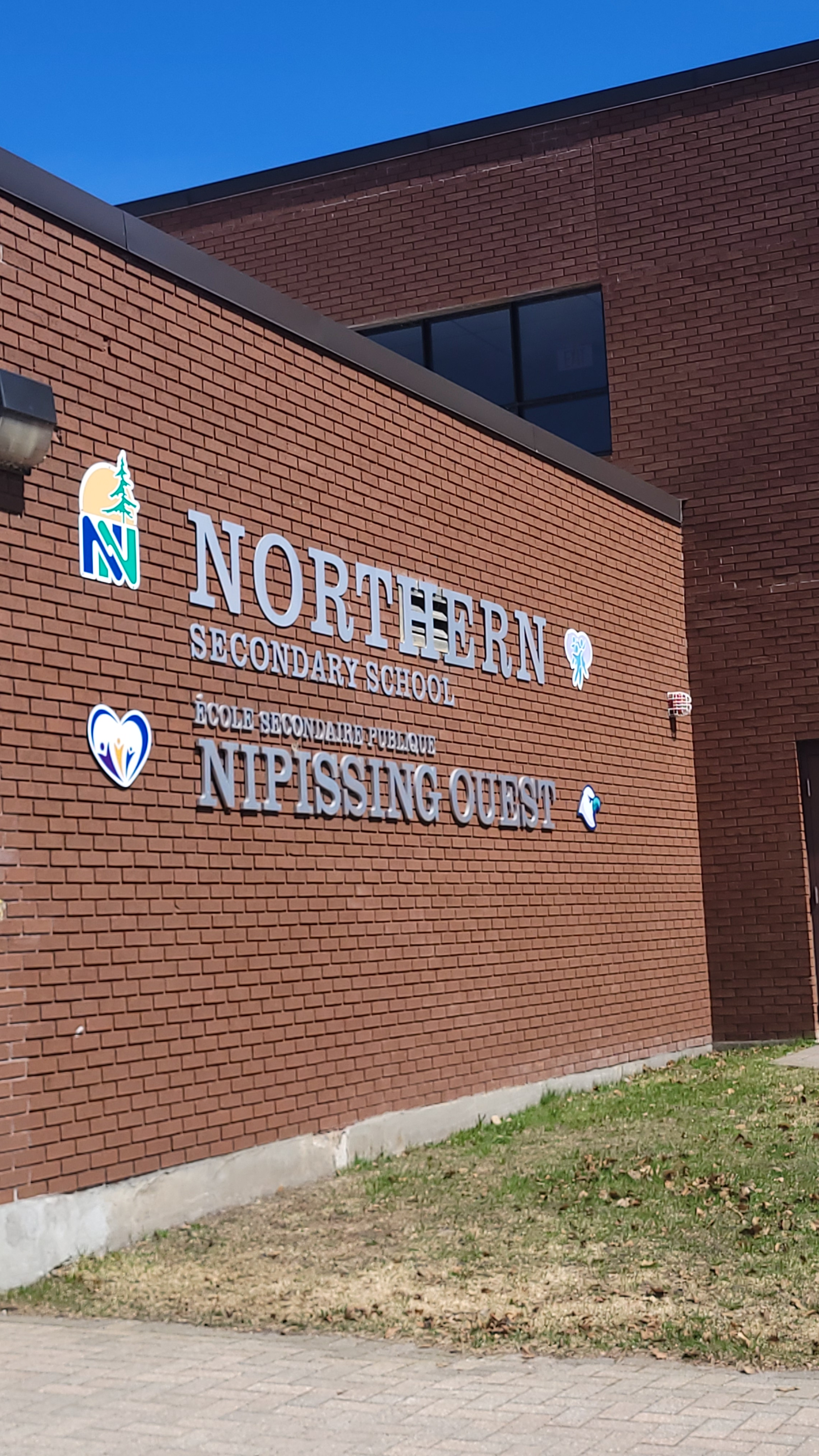
- Photo of the Northern Secondary School Logo

Location
- 175 Ethel Street; Sturgeon Falls, Ontario, P2B 2Z8; Canada; 46.3751°N 79.9195°W

Information
- Founded: December 8th, 1971
- School board: Near North District School Board
- School number: 946109
- Principal: Jamey Byers
- Grades: 7–12
- Enrollment: 175 (2024–2025)
- Colours: Red and Silver
- Team name: Stars
- Website: www.nearnorthschools.ca/northern/

Northern Secondary School, or simply Northern, is a secondary school in the town of Sturgeon Falls, Ontario, in the Nipissing District of Ontario, Canada. It is operated by the Near North District School Board and is located in the same building as École secondaire publique Nipissing Ouest. Northern Secondary School provides French and English learning courses, as well as Ojibwe. Northern Secondary School was founded on December 8, 1971, and was known as Northern Braves. Its logo was created by former student, Terry Dokis. The team name and logo changed to the Stars on June 24, 2019 and was created by Brandon Harvey, a graduating student at Northern. Northern offers grade 7–12 education, offering academic, applied and essential pathways.

== Team History ==
Northern changed the logo and name of the team to the Stars after Near North District School Board found Northern Braves stereotypical.

== See also ==
- Education in Ontario
- List of secondary schools in Ontario
