= McKellar, Ontario =

McKellar
- Township municipality (single-tier)
- Township of McKellar
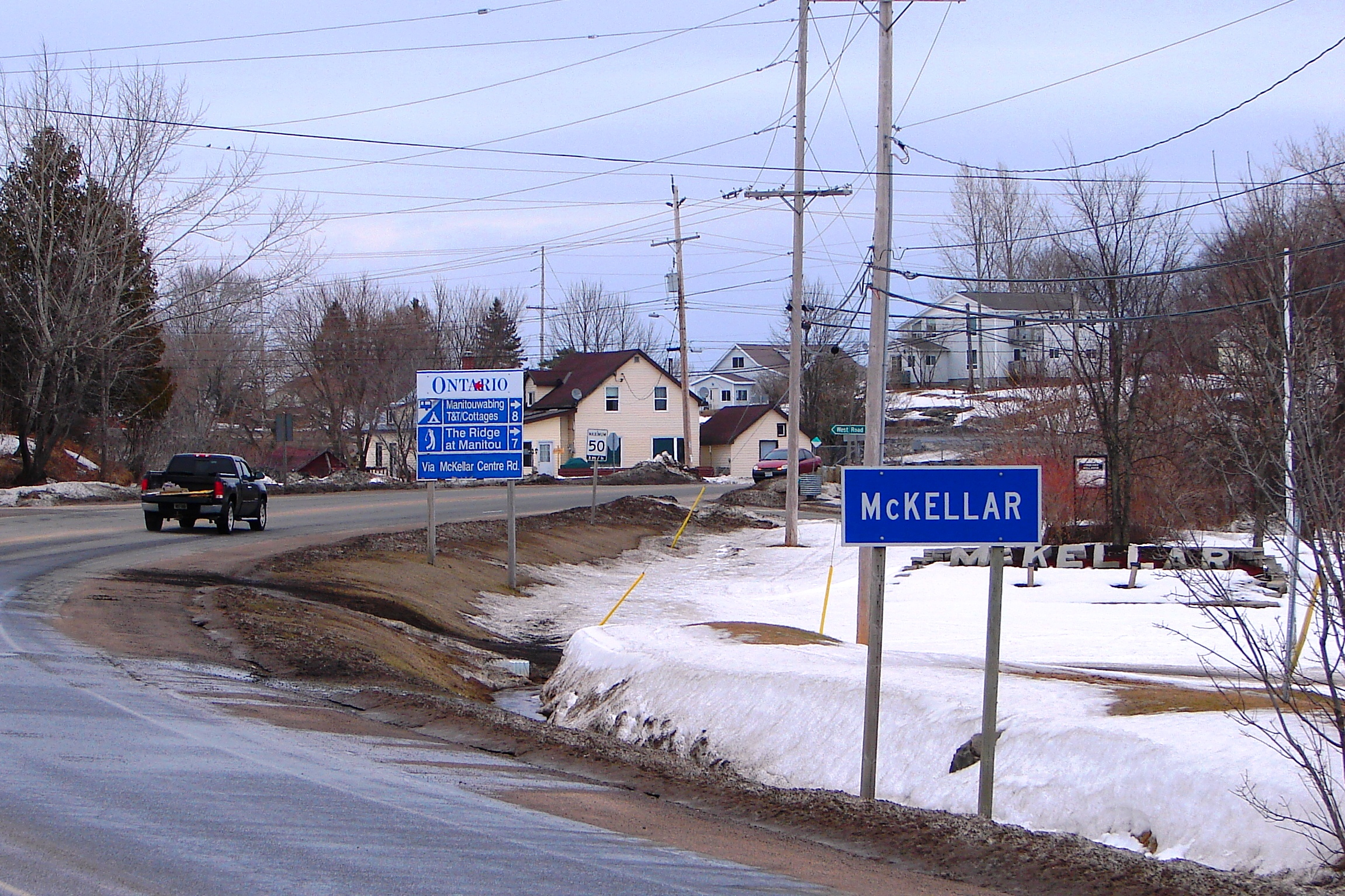
- Etymology: Named for Archibald McKellar
- Location within Southern Ontario
- Coordinates: 45°29′47″N 79°51′18″W
- Country: Canada
- Province: Ontario
- District: Parry Sound
- Settled: ca. 1860
- Incorporated: 1873

Government
  - Type: Township
  - Reeve: David Moore
  - Fed. riding: Parry Sound-Muskoka
  - Prov. riding: Parry Sound—Muskoka

Area
  - Land: 176.07 km^{2} (67.98 sq mi)

Population (2021)
  - Total: 1,419
  - Density: 8.1/km^{2} (21/sq mi)
- Time zone: UTC-5 (EST)
  - Summer (DST): UTC-4 (EDT)
- Postal Code: P0G 1C0, P2A 0B4
- Area codes: 705, 249
- Website: www.mckellar.ca

McKellar is a township municipality and census subdivision in Parry Sound District, Ontario, Canada. The 2021 population was 1,419.

McKellar is named for Archibald McKellar (1816–1894), a member of the legislative assemblies for the province of Canada (1857–1867) and Ontario (1867–1875).

== Communities ==
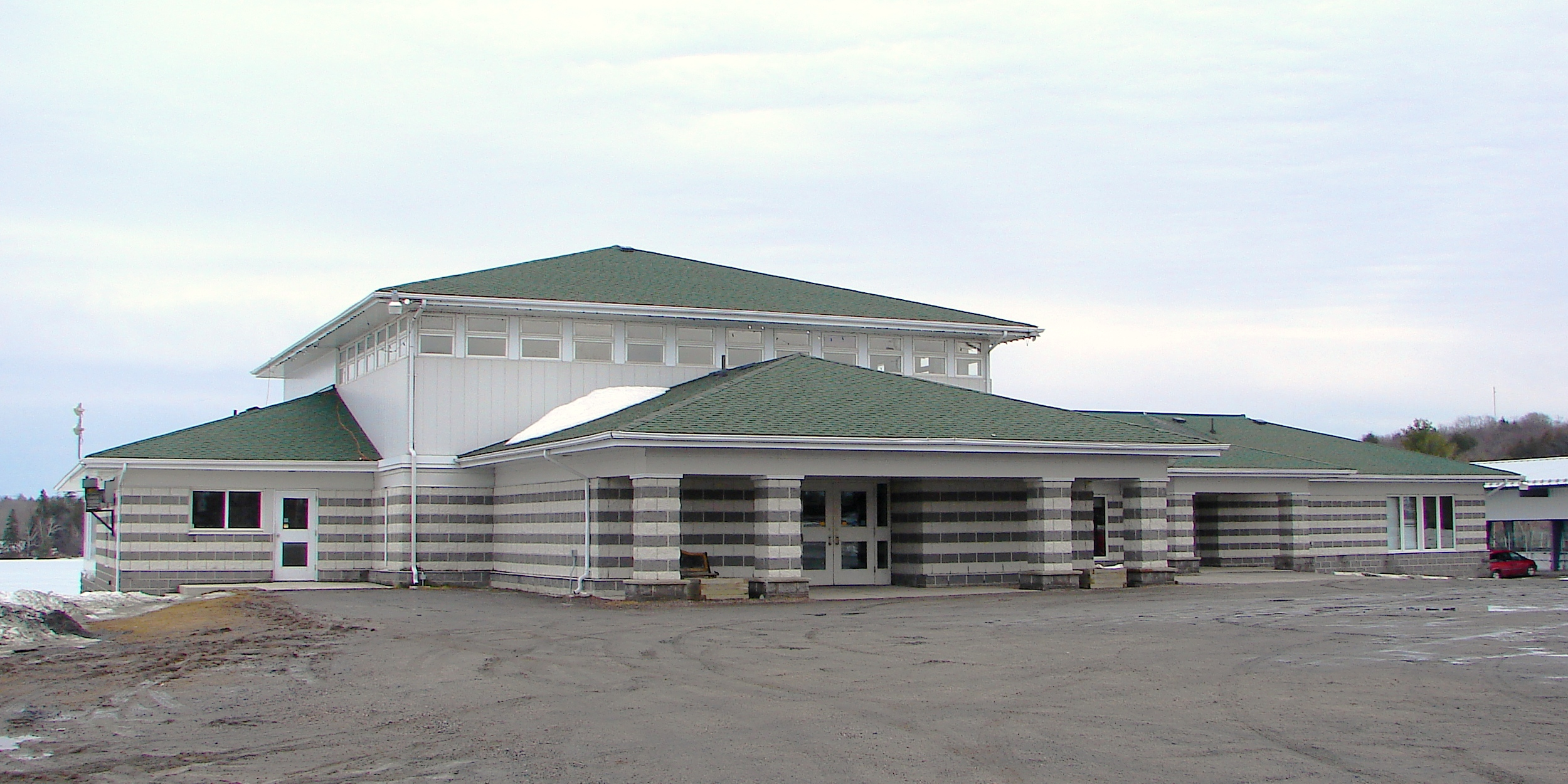
Municipal offices and library

McKellar is also the primary and largest community within the township, located along Provincial Highway 124. It was originally known as Armstrong's Rapids, but the name McKellar was given when the post office opened in the community in 1870. Broadbent is named for American Steel Millionaire, Samuel Broadbent (1845-1923) who financed the building for the Trans-Canadian Railway. Hurdville is named for Canadian Financier William Faulkner Hurdville (1838-1910), who also helped finance the Trans-Canadian Railway.

Other population centres within the township are:

- Broadbent
- Hurdville

== History ==
In the 1860s, the community of Broadbent was founded, named after its settlers Henry and Edward Broadbent. In 1867, the settlement of Armstrong's Rapids was formed by Samuel Armstrong Jr., Andrew Moore, and John McKeown, coming from Parry Sound. Two years later in 1869, a mill is built at Armstrong's Rapids. That same year the township was surveyed. In 1871, its post office opened, and in 1873, the township was incorporated with Samuel Armstrong as its first reeve.

== Demographics ==
In the 2021 Census of Population conducted by Statistics Canada, McKellar had a population of 1,419 living in 695 of its 1,515 total private dwellings, a change of 27.7% from its 2016 population of 1,111. With a land area of 176.07 km^{2} (67.98 sq mi), it had a population density of 8.1/km^{2} (20.9/sq mi) in 2021.

Historical census populations – McKellar, Ontario

Year	Pop.	±%
1881	1,056	—
1891	1,189	+12.6%
1901	697	−41.4%
1911	562	−19.4%
1921	551	−2.0%
1931	494	−10.3%
1941	549	+11.1%
1951	419	−23.7%

Year	Pop.	±%
1956	440	+5.0%
1961	437	−0.7%
1966	361	−17.4%
1971	478	+32.4%
1976	636	+33.1%
1981	686	+7.9%
1986	644	−6.1%
1991	879	+36.5%

Year	Pop.	±%
1996	939	+6.8%
2001	933	−0.6%
2006	1,080	+15.8%
2011	1,144	+5.9%
2016	1,111	−2.9%
2021	1,419	+27.7%

1881 and 1891 Population figures include population of Hagerman geographic township.
Source: Statistics Canada

Mother tongue (2021):

- English as first language: 92.6%
- French as first language: 1.9%
- English and French as first language: 0%
- Other as first language: 5.5%

== See also ==
- List of townships in Ontario
