= Near North District School Board =

School board in Ontario, Canada

Near North District School Board NNDSB

Location
- 963 Airport Road, North Bay, Ontario P1C 1A5 Canada
- Coordinates: 46.34627°N 79.43648°W

District information
- Chief executive officer: Jay MacJanet
- Chair of the board: Vacant
- Schools: 34: 27 elementary, 7 secondary
- Budget: CA$160 Million (2020)

Students and staff
- Students: 10,000

Other information
- Elected trustees: Shane Hall, Bill Steer, Chantal Phillips, Jeanie Fuscaldo, Howard Wesley, Julie Ann Bertram, Louise Sargent, Ashley St. Pierre
- Student trustees: Nanak Sidhu, Riley Trudeau
- Superintendents: Melanie Gray (S.O., Education); Tim Graves (S.O., Education); Seija Van Haesendonck (S.O., Business); Gay Smylie (S.O., Schools)
- Website: www.nearnorthschools.ca

The Near North District School Board (NNDSB; known as English-language Public District School Board No. 4 prior to 1999) administers public education in an area of Ontario that includes all of Parry Sound District, plus a northerly portion of Muskoka District and the western portion of Nipissing District. It includes the communities of North Bay, Parry Sound, Mattawa and the Almaguin Highlands.

== History ==
The NNDSB was previously known as the Parry Sound and Area School Board.

In 2006, three former students filed lawsuits against the NNDSB for the sexual abuse they suffered at the hands of Kenneth Bull, a former teacher of the school board. Bull taught at Humphrey Public School, where the assaults occurred. Bull was convicted of five counts of indecent assault against young males in 1978. The school board was named in the lawsuit for its failure to protect the students.

On December 1, 2025, the province took control of the school board after a Ministry of Education review, spurred by the new Parry Sound school that was expected to be finished by the beginning of 2025–2026 school year would not open in time, confirmed that the board had "deep-rooted dysfunction and mismanagement that have eroded public confidence." Education Minister Paul Calandra became the temporary board supervisor.

== Schools ==
There are 34 schools governed by NNDSB, consisting of 27 elementary schools and 7 high schools:

=== Elementary schools ===
- Alliance Public School – North Bay
- Argyle Public School – Port Loring
- Britt Public School – Britt
- Evergreen Heights Education Centre – Emsdale (Perry)
- Ferris Glen Public School – Corbeil (East Ferris)
- Humphrey Public School – Seguin
- Land of Lakes Public School – Burk's Falls
- M. T. Davidson Public School – Callander
- MacTier Public School – MacTier
- Magnetawan Central Public School – Magnetawan
- Mapleridge Public School – Powassan
- Mattawa District Public School – Mattawa
- McDougall Public School – McDougall (Parry Sound)
- Nobel Public School – Nobel
- Parry Sound Public School – Parry Sound
- Phelps Central Public School – Redbridge
- Silver Birches Public School – North Bay
- South River Public School – South River
- South Shore Education Centre – Nipissing
- Sundridge Centennial Public School – Sundridge
- Sunset Park Public School – North Bay
- Vincent Massey Public School – North Bay
- White Woods Public School – Sturgeon Falls (West Nipissing)
- Whitestone Lake Central School – Dunchurch
- Woodland Public School – North Bay

=== Secondary Schools/Alternative Learning Centres ===
- Almaguin Highlands Secondary School – South River (Strong)
- Chippewa Secondary School – North Bay
- F. J. McElligott Secondary School – Mattawa
- Laurentian Learning Centre (formerly the Nipissing Alternative School) – North Bay
- Northern Secondary School – Sturgeon Falls
- Parry Sound High School – Parry Sound
- West Ferris Secondary School – North Bay

Construction on a new school that was to replace Parry Sound High School, Parry Sound Intermediate, and McDougall and Nobel Elementary Schools is under way. The planned opening day is in September 2025.

== See also ==
- List of school districts in Ontario
- List of high schools in Ontario
