= Don Beatty =

Canadian football player

Profile
- Position: End

Personal information
- Born: c. 1930
- Died: October 16, 2010; Sundridge, Ontario
- Listed height: 6 ft 3 in (1.91 m)
- Listed weight: 195 lb (88 kg)

Career history
- 1948: Hamilton Wildcats
- 1952: Calgary Stampeders
- 1953: Hamilton Tiger-Cats

Awards and highlights
- Grey Cup champion (1953)

Donald Roy Beatty (c. 1930 – October 16, 2010) was a Canadian football player who played for the Hamilton Wildcats, Calgary Stampeders, and Hamilton Tiger-Cats. He won the Grey Cup with Hamilton in 1953. He previously played football at and attended the University of Western Ontario. He died in 2010.
