= Lake Bernard =

Lake in Parry Sound District, Ontario, Canada

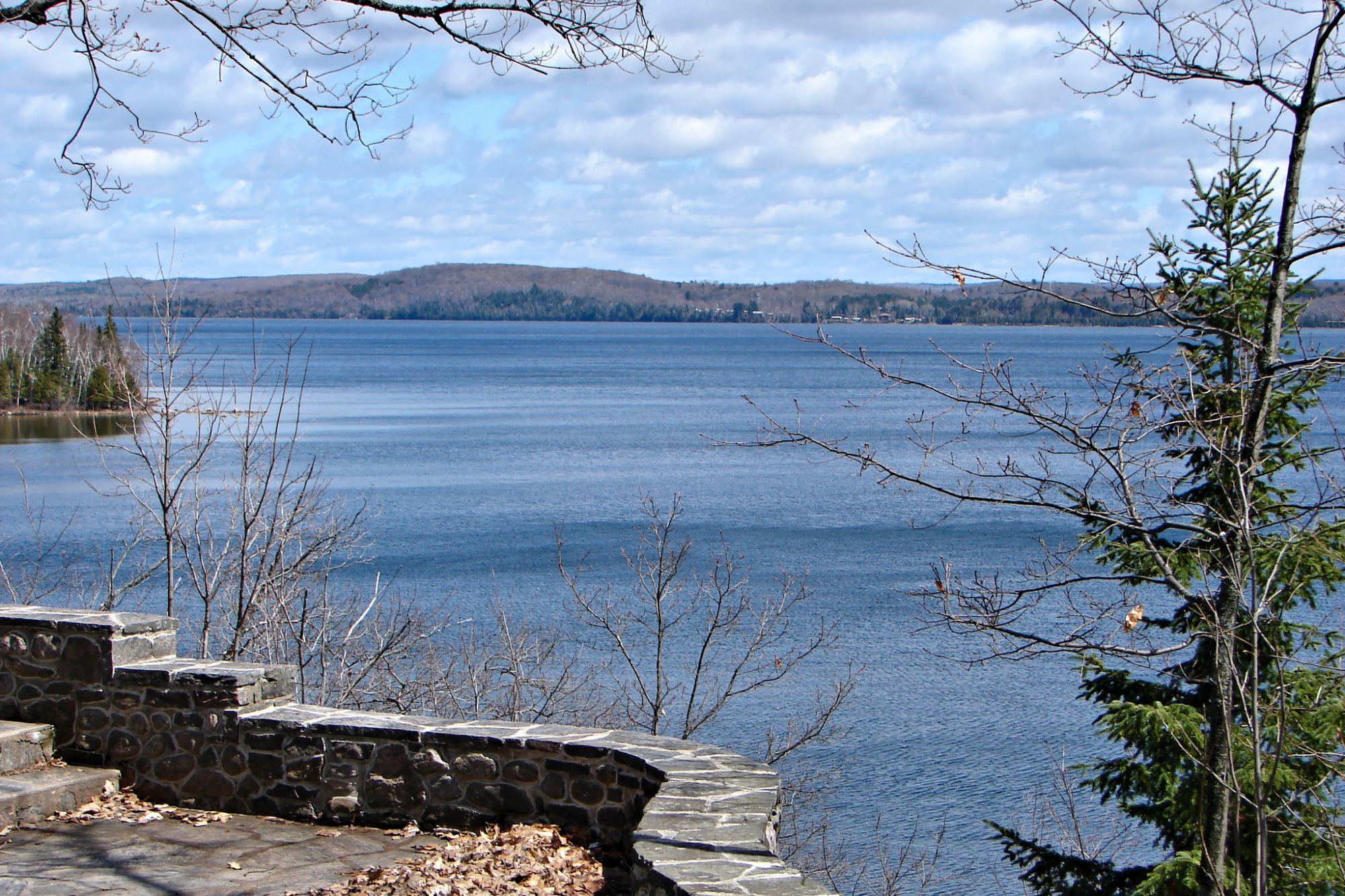

- Location within Southern Ontario
- Location: Strong, Ontario, Canada
- Coordinates: 45°44′00″N 79°23′00″W
- Primary outflows: Stirling Creek
- Basin countries: Canada
- Max. length: 7 km (4.3 mi)
- Max. width: 2.5 km (1.6 mi)
- Surface area: 20.9 km^{2} (8.1 sq mi)
- Islands: 0
- Settlements: Sundridge, Ontario

Lake Bernard is a freshwater lake 276 km (171 mi) north of Toronto and 23 km (14 mi) west of Algonquin Park in Parry Sound District, Ontario, Canada, between Huntsville and North Bay. Its area is approximately 21 km^{2} (8.1 sq mi) and it measures roughly 3 km (1.9 mi) across and 8 km (5.0 mi) long. The village of Sundridge lies on the northern shore of this clean, clear lake, which is otherwise surrounded by the municipal township of Strong. The lake has been named after a family who hunted and trapped for many years in the area.

Lake Bernard is the largest freshwater lake in the world without an island. It is a deep lake, charted to depths of 45.7 metres (150 ft)

Historically, the lake was primarily used for logging, and one may still see many logs which have become waterlogged and sunk to the bottom. Lake Bernard used to be called Stoney Lake, due to the large volume of rock found around the southern shores of the lake. Much of the lake has sandy beaches and many areas feature a sandy bottom and shallow waters.

Summer events on Lake Bernard include the annual Canada Day festivities in July and the Sunflower Festival and RBC Sundridge Triathlon each August.

Fish species in the lake include lake trout, rainbow trout, speckled trout, whitefish, yellow perch and smallmouth bass. Because Lake Bernard is large and deep, fishing for bass is limited to some areas, but lake trout and whitefish are plentiful in this stocked lake.

Lake Bernard's attractions include High Park Lookout and hiking trails. Lake Bernard is also part of the Discovery Routes Trails system for cycling. Snowmobiling on and around the lake and ice fishing are popular during the winter and huts can be seen on the lake until April. Dog-sledding can be arranged at local resorts. Lake Bernard is also home to Glen Bernard Camp, a residential girls' camp founded in 1922 by Mary S. Edgar.

The shores of the lake have been developed with non-permanent residences and cottages as well as permanent residents, many of whom are descendants of the original settlers to the area in the latter half of the 1800s. There is an active property owners' association on the lake, focusing on protecting lake health and building community. Several resorts have also made Lake Bernard their home, including Shady Nook Cottages, the Northridge Inn & Resort, Lake Bernard Park campground and Caswell Resort Hotel.

== See also ==
- List of lakes in Ontario
