= Dunchurch, Ontario =

Compact rural community in Parry Sound District, Ontario, Canada

Dunchurch
- Compact rural community
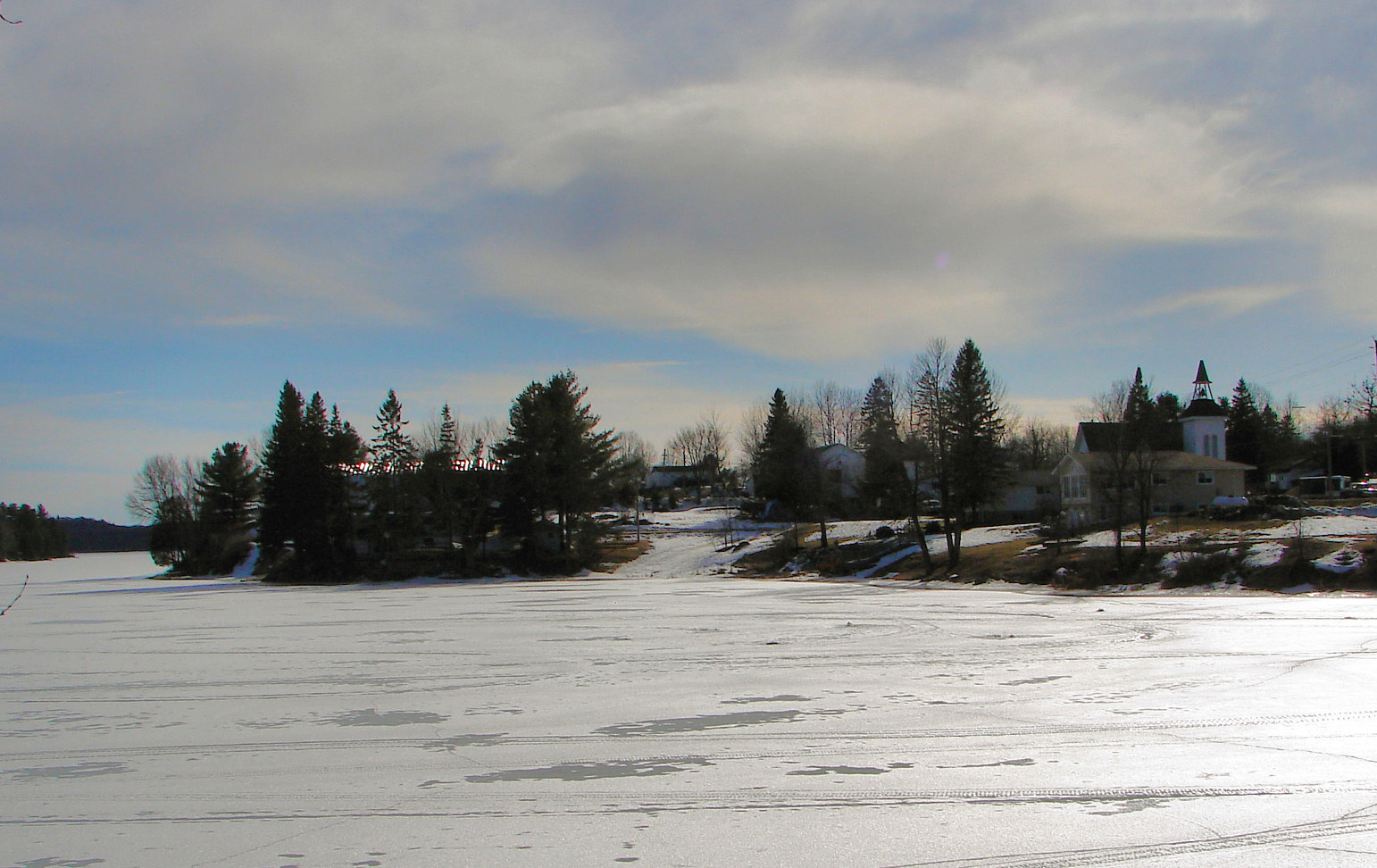
- Etymology: named after Dunchurch, Warwickshire
- Location of Dunchurch in southern Ontario
- Coordinates: 45°38′55″N 79°51′04″W
- Country: Canada
- Province: Ontario
- Census division: Parry Sound District
- Municipality: Whitestone
- First settled: Summer 1870
- First named: 1873
- Given present name: 1877
- Elevation: 258 m (846 ft)
- Time zone: UTC-5 (Eastern (EST))
  - Summer (DST): UTC-4 (EDT)
- Postal Code: P0A 1G0
- Area codes: 705, 249

Dunchurch is a compact rural community in the Canadian province of Ontario, located in the municipality of Whitestone in Parry Sound District.

== History ==
The community was first settled in late summer 1870 when Arthur Millin, arriving on The Great North Road (that had begun construction in 1867) from Parry Sound, claimed a homestead plot. In 1873, the community was given the name Newcombe. The first log schoolhouse, which doubled as a union church (a church available to multiple denominations), was erected in 1875 on land in the centre of the community. To avoid confusion with similarly named places in the province, in 1877 postmaster George Kelcey renamed the community after his birthplace in Warwickshire, England. Organizing for the founding of a Presbyterian church was first recorded in 1889, and a church building completed in 1897 as Knox Presbyterian Church. The building serves today as Knox United Church. The first public lending library opened in Dunchurch in 1973 in part of a portable classroom.

== Geography ==
The community is on Whitestone Lake, which eventually flows to Georgian Bay on Lake Huron as part of the Magnetawan River system. Two narrows in the community, Dunchurch Narrows and Dunchurch Second Narrows — with a small basin in between —, separate the North Reach of Whitestone Lake from the Middle Reach.

=== Climate ===
The Meteorological Service of Canada had a measurement station (site ID: 6112133) at Dunchurch operating from 1973 to 2014.

Dunchurch (MSC site ID: 6112133)

Climate chart (precipitation, max. and min. temperature)
J	F	M	A	M	J	J	A	S	O	N	D
108 −6 −17	69 −4 −16	70 2 −10	72 10 −2	91 18 4	83 23 9	83 25 12	92 24 11	114 19 7	111 12 2	117 4 −4	106 −3 −13
- █ Average max. and min. temperatures in °C
- █ Precipitation totals in mm
- Source: Environment Canada
Imperial conversion
J	F	M	A	M	J	J	A	S	O	N	D
4.3 22 1	2.7 26 4	2.8 36 14	2.8 50 29	3.6 65 40	3.3 73 48	3.2 77 54	3.6 75 52	4.5 65 45	4.4 53 35	4.6 39 25	4.2 28 9
- █ Average max. and min. temperatures in °F
- █ Precipitation totals in inches

== Government ==
The offices of the Municipality of Whitestone are in Dunchurch. They were built for the then Township of Hagerman in 1997. The building also houses a branch of the Whitestone Fire department. Adjacent is the Whitestone and Area Nursing Station, managed by West Parry Sound Health Centre, where healthcare services are provided by a nurse practitioner. The community is the site of one of two waste management facilities in Whitestone.

== Transportation ==
Dunchurch is on Ontario Highway 124 and on Ontario Highway 520.

== Education ==
Whitestone Lake Public School (JK–8) is operated by the Near North District School Board.

The Whitestone Public Library is located in Dunchurch. As of January 2021, the facility is closed for renovation and expansion, which will include the addition of two meeting rooms and a conference room.
