= Chippewa Secondary School =

Location
- 69 Chippewa Street West; North Bay, Ontario, P1B 6G8; Canada; 46.32254°N 79.45078°W

Information
- School type: Grades 7-12 Intermediate & Secondary School
- Founded: 1958
- School board: Near North District School Board
- Superintendent: Gaye Smylie
- Principal: Krista "KTP" Tucker Petrick
- Grades: 7-8, 9-12
- Enrollment: ~1400 (2025)
- Language: English/French Immersion
- Colours: Scarlet and Gold
- Mascot: under review (formerly Joe Raider)
- Team name: Chippewa Ravens
- Website: www.nearnorthschools.ca/Chippewa

Chippewa Secondary School is located along Chippewa Creek in North Bay, Ontario and is part of the Near North District School Board. A Grade 7-12 school, Chippewa offers English and Immersion French programming for Grades 7 through 12. In addition, students can enroll in Specialist High Skills Majors Arts and Culture, Business, Sports or Health, and Wellness. Chippewa Secondary School is an accredited school for the International Baccalaureate Diploma Program since 2015.

Chippewa's motto is "Carpe Diem" which is Latin for "Seize The Day". Athletes and students at Chippewa are known as the Chippewa Ravens, and the school colours are scarlet and gold, although newer school sportswear is often red and black.

The school was founded in 1958 and was named after the First Nation Chippewas.

== Robotics ==
Chippewa Intermediate and Secondary School is the birthplace of FIRST Robotics Competition Team 1305, nicknamed Ice Cubed.

== Academics ==
Chippewa is the first public school in North Bay to offer the IB Diploma Program.

== Arts ==
Chippewa Secondary school has several art programs including Dance, Music, Visual Arts, Film and Video, Vocal Music, and Drama. Chippewa offers a Dance team "Raider Dance" and three separate bands, including Senior Band, Junior Band, and Jazz Band.

== See also ==
- Education in Ontario
- List of secondary schools in Ontario
- International Baccalaureate Diploma Program
