= West Ferris Secondary School =

Location
- 60 Marshall Park Drive; North Bay, Ontario, P1A 2P2; Canada
- 46.27711°N 79.43434°W

Information
- School type: High school
- School board: Near North District School Board
- Principal: Dr. Gillian Kajganich
- Grades: 7-12
- Enrollment: ~1100 (2021)
- Language: English
- Colours: Green and White
- Mascot: Trojan
- Team name: West Ferris Trojans
- Website: www.nearnorthschools.ca/west-ferris/

West Ferris Secondary School (WFSS) is located on Marshall Park Drive in the West Ferris area of North Bay, Ontario. It is a member of the Near North District School Board.

== Overview ==
West Ferris Secondary School's motto is "Commit to Excellence". Athletes and students at West Ferris are known as the West Ferris Trojans and the school colours are forest green and white.

West Ferris Secondary School offers six different Specialist High Skills Major (SHSM) courses. These SHSM courses are offered in the Construction, Mining and Manufacturing, Environment, Hospitality and Tourism, Business, and Arts and Culture domains, and students who complete a sufficient number of courses in one of these areas are awarded a special certificate indicating a competency in said field. West Ferris also has the STEAM program in which each student is provided with a Macbook and go through a number of higher standard technology focused courses.

== See also ==
- Education in Ontario
- List of secondary schools in Ontario
