= Whitestone, Ontario =

Whitestone
- Municipality (single-tier)
- Municipality of Whitestone
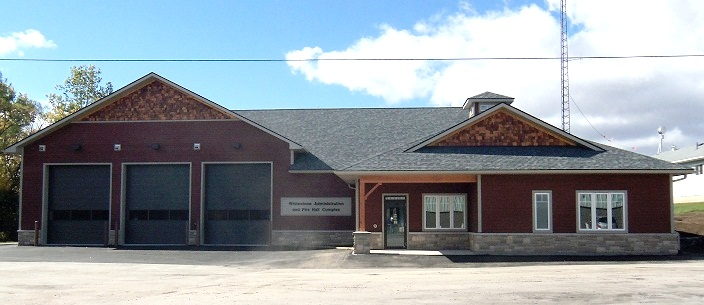
- Whitestone municipal office in Dunchurch

- Location within Southern Ontario
- Coordinates: 45°41′N 79°59′W
- Country: Canada
- Province: Ontario
- District: Parry Sound
- Incorporated: 2000

Government
  - Type: Municipality
  - Mayor: George Comrie
  - Fed. riding: Parry Sound-Muskoka
  - Prov. riding: Parry Sound—Muskoka

Area
  - Land: 923.70 km^{2} (356.64 sq mi)

Population (2021)
  - Total: 1,075
  - Density: 1.2/km^{2} (3.1/sq mi)
- Time zone: UTC-5 (EST)
  - Summer (DST): UTC-4 (EDT)
- Postal Code: P0A
- Area codes: 705, 249
- Website: www.whitestone.ca

Whitestone is a municipality in the Canadian province of Ontario, as well as the name of a community within the municipality.

The municipality, located in the Parry Sound District, had a population of 1075 in the 2021 Canadian census.

== History ==
In 2000, the Municipality of Whitestone was formed out of Unorganized Centre Parry Sound District and incorporated by the Parry Sound District Restructuring Commission. The new municipality includes the geographic townships of East Burpee, Burton, McKenzie, Ferrie, Hagerman, and part of Croft.

A popular attraction was once the Ardbeg fire tower, which was one of the last remaining staffed fire towers in Southern Ontario until the early 1970s when aerial forest fire detection took over. It stood on a small hill where the road meets the railway.

== Geography ==
The municipality's vegetation is dominated by white pine trees, and the area is dotted with many lakes, including Wahwashkesh Lake, Shawanaga Lake, Whitestone Lake, Wilson Lake () and Lorimer Lake. The three major rivers are Magnetawan River, Shawanaga River, and Naiscoot River, all flowing west into Georgian Bay.

=== Communities ===
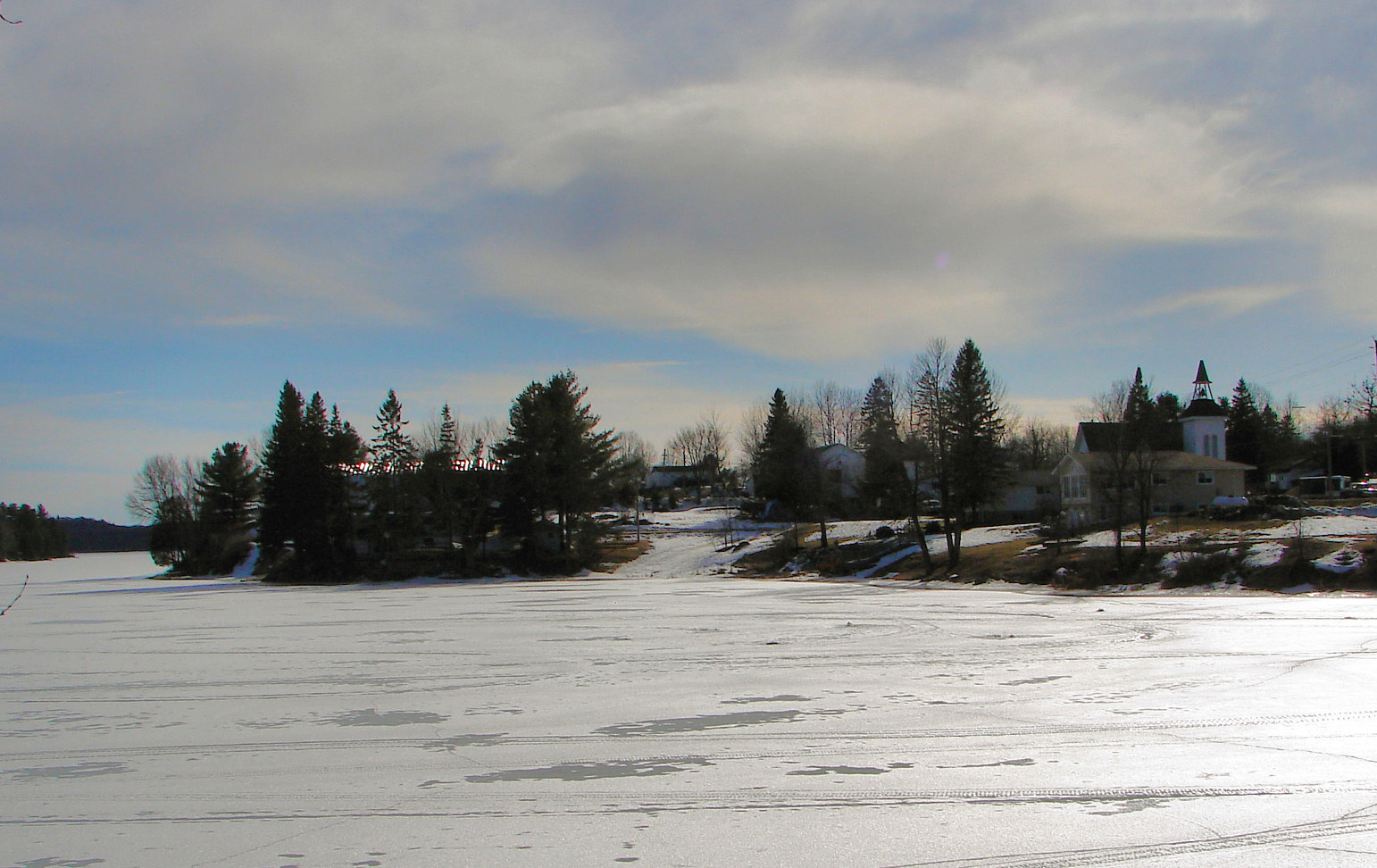
Dunchurch

The municipality comprises the communities of:

- Ardbeg
- Boakview
- Bolger
- Burton
- Dunchurch
- Fairholme
- Lorimer Lake
- Maple Island
- South Magnetawan
- Sunny Slope
- Wahwashkesh
- Whitestone

== Demographics ==
In the 2021 Census of Population conducted by Statistics Canada, Whitestone had a population of 1,075 living in 549 of its 1,427 total private dwellings, a change of 17.4% from its 2016 population of 916. With a land area of 923.7 km^{2} (356.6 sq mi), it had a population density of 1.2/km^{2} (3.0/sq mi) in 2021.

Historical census populations – Whitestone, Ontario
Year	Pop.	±%
1996	802	—
2001	853	+6.4%
2006	1,030	+20.8%
2011	918	−10.9%
2016	916	−0.2%
2021	1,075	+17.4%
Source: Statistics Canada

Mother tongue (2021):

- English as first language: 92.1%
- French as first language: 1.9%
- English and French as first languages: 0.5%
- Other as first language: 5.1%

== See also ==
- List of townships in Ontario
