= Parry Sound High School =

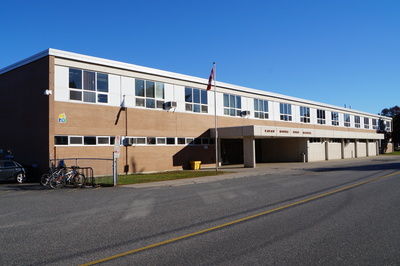

Location
- 111 Isabella Street; Parry Sound, Ontario, P2A 1N2; Canada; 45.3544°N 80.0374°W

Information
- School type: Public, High school
- Motto: Omnia Vestigia Prorsum ("All Steps Forward")
- Founded: 1951
- School board: Near North District School Board
- School number: 934275
- Principal: Heather Howald
- Grades: 9–12
- Enrollment: 842 (October 2013)
- Language: English; French Immersion; Ojibwe
- Colours: Cardinal and Slate
- Mascot: Panther
- Team name: PSHS Panthers
- Website: www.nearnorthschools.ca/parry-sound/

Parry Sound High School (PSHS) is a public high school in the town of Parry Sound, Ontario, Canada. The school is one of the largest in the Near North District School Board, with 842 students as of October 2011, and serves as the only high school in Parry Sound.

Parry Sound High School's motto is the Latin Omnia Vestigia Prorsum which translates to "All Steps Forward". Athletes and students at PSHS are known as the PSHS Panthers, and the school colours are cardinal and slate.

The school was founded in 1951.

During the summer of 2025, the high school went under a long-time planned construction and teardown, to make a new school. It faces delays and is no longer planned to be done by September of 2025, instead being pushed back to 2026.

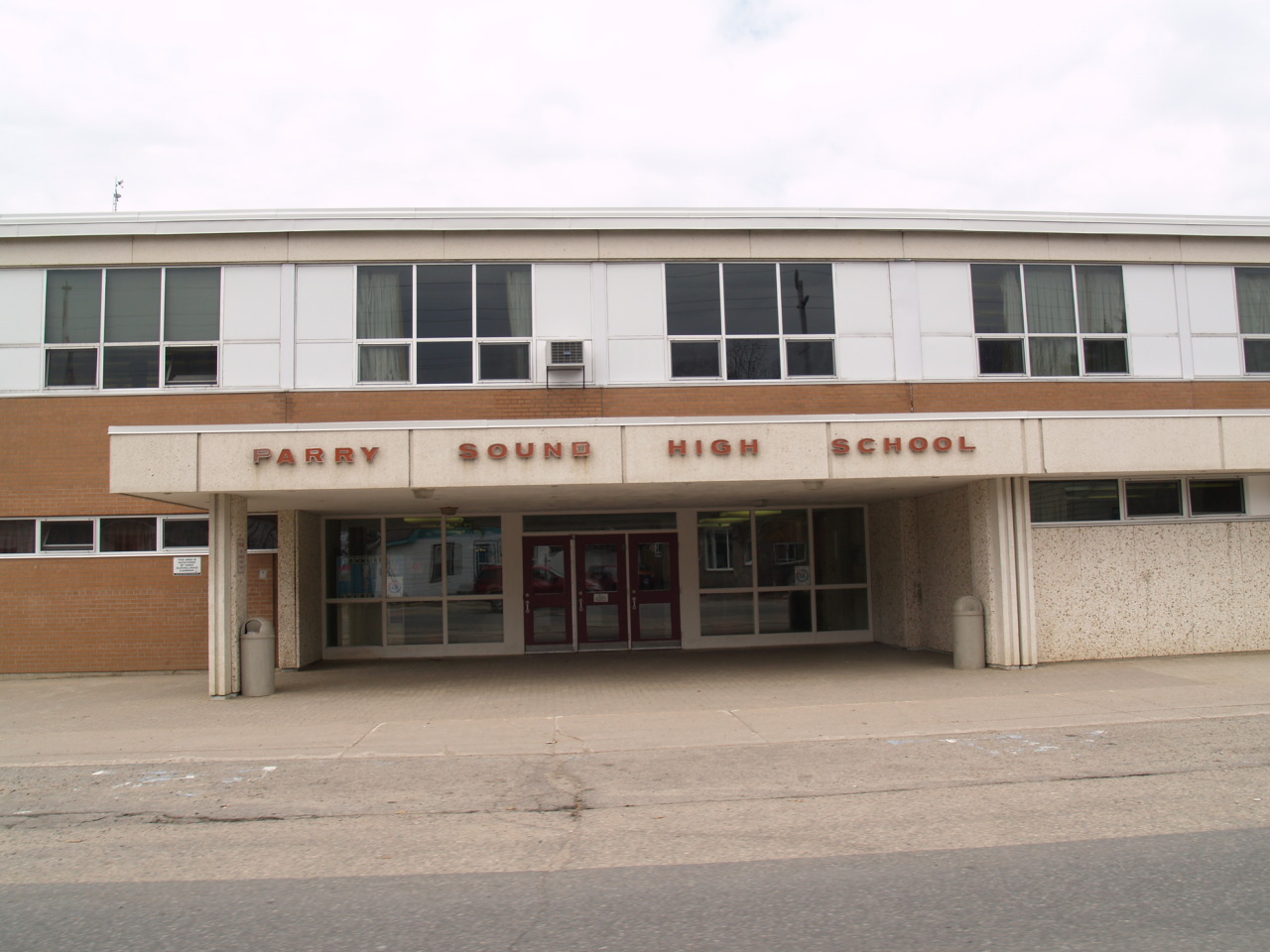
Front entrance to Parry Sound High School

== Notable alumni ==
- Bill Beagan, ice hockey referee and league commissioner
- Megan Oldham, freestyle skier.

== See also ==
- Education in Ontario
- List of secondary schools in Ontario
