= Strong, Ontario =

Strong
- Township (single-tier)
- Township of Strong
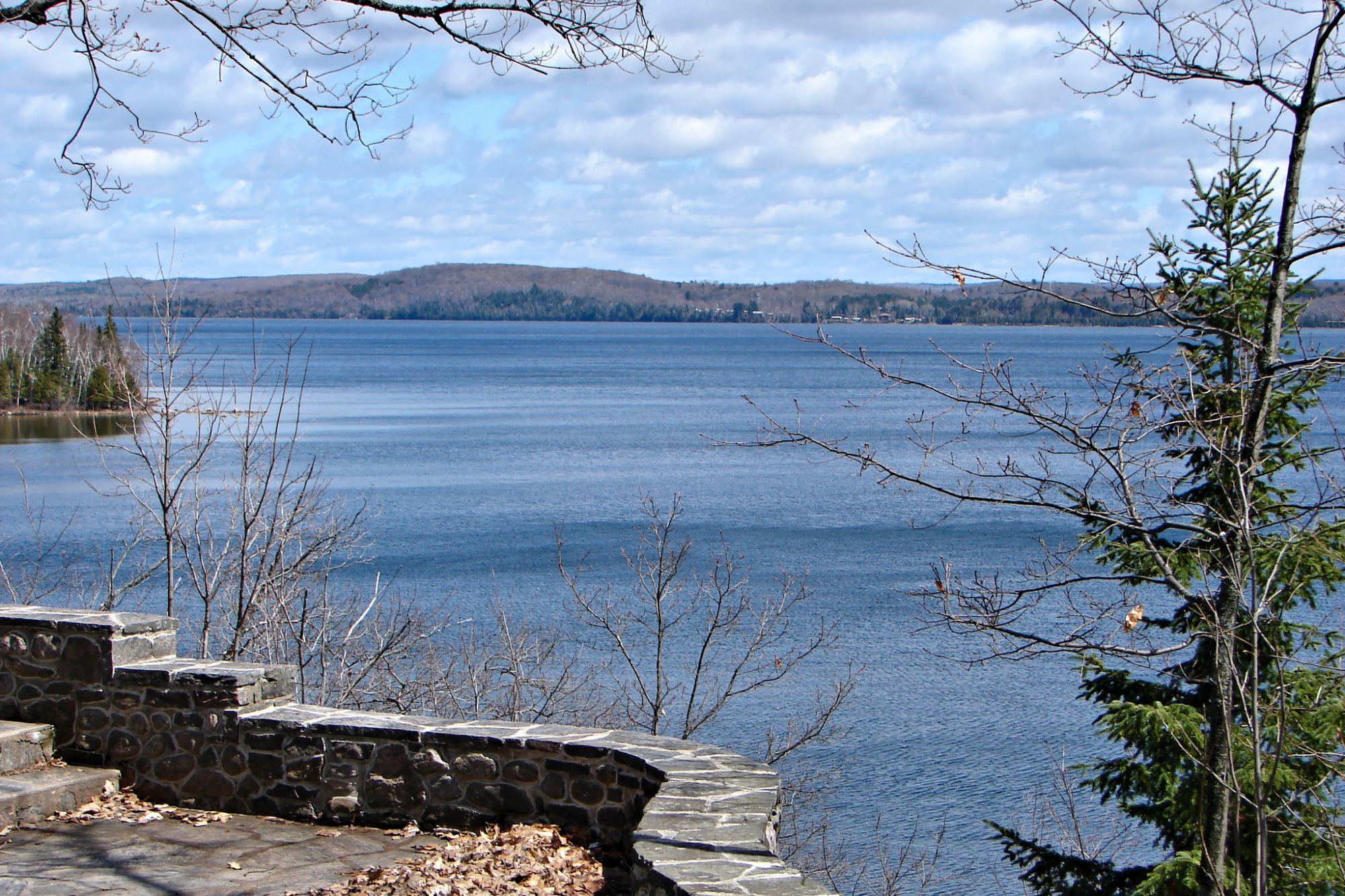
- Lake Bernard in Strong Township
- Motto: Together for a strong tomorrow
- Location within Southern Ontario
- Coordinates: 45°45′N 79°24′W
- Country: Canada
- Province: Ontario
- District: Parry Sound
- Settled: 1876
- Incorporated: 1877

Government
  - Type: Township
  - Mayor: Tim Bryson
  - Fed. riding: Parry Sound-Muskoka
  - Prov. riding: Parry Sound—Muskoka

Area
  - Land: 158.88 km^{2} (61.34 sq mi)

Population (2021)
  - Total: 1,566
  - Density: 9.9/km^{2} (26/sq mi)
- Time zone: UTC-5 (EST)
  - Summer (DST): UTC-4 (EDT)
- Postal Code: P0A
- Area codes: 705, 249
- Website: www.strongtownship.com

Strong is a township in the Canadian province of Ontario, as well as the name of a community within the township. Located in the Almaguin Highlands region of Parry Sound District, the township surrounds but does not include the village of Sundridge.

The township includes the communities of Hartfell, Kennedys, Lake Bernard, Pevensey, Stirling Falls, and Strong. It is home to Lake Bernard.

Strong Township is accessible via Highway 11 and Highway 124. It is bisected by the CN railway.

== History ==
Settlement of the township began after The Free Grants and Homestead Act of 1868, with the first settlers arriving in 1876. The Township of Strong was incorporated the following year.

In 1885, the Northern and Pacific Junction Railway (now CN) was built through the township. In 1889, the village of Sundridge split off from the township to form a separate village municipality.

== Demographics ==
In the 2021 Census of Population conducted by Statistics Canada, Strong had a population of 1,566 living in 660 of its 953 total private dwellings, a change of 8.8% from its 2016 population of 1,439. With a land area of 158.88 km^{2} (61.34 sq mi), it had a population density of 9.9/km^{2} (25.5/sq mi) in 2021.

Historical census populations – Strong, Ontario

Year	Pop.	±%
1881	1,744	—
1891	1,500	−14.0%
1901	768	−48.8%
1911	659	−14.2%
1921	632	−4.1%
1931	665	+5.2%
1941	688	+3.5%
1951	676	−1.7%

Year	Pop.	±%
1956	709	+4.9%
1961	733	+3.4%
1966	846	+15.4%
1971	972	+14.9%
1976	1,244	+28.0%
1981	1,278	+2.7%
1986	1,250	−2.2%
1991	1,377	+10.2%

Year	Pop.	±%
1996	1,393	+1.2%
2001	1,369	−1.7%
2006	1,327	−3.1%
2011	1,341	+1.1%
2016	1,439	+7.3%
2021	1,566	+8.8%

Population counts are not adjusted for boundary changes.
Source: Statistics Canada

Mother tongue (2021):

- English as first language: 95.8%
- French as first language: 0.6%
- English and French as first languages: 0%
- Other as first language: 3.5%

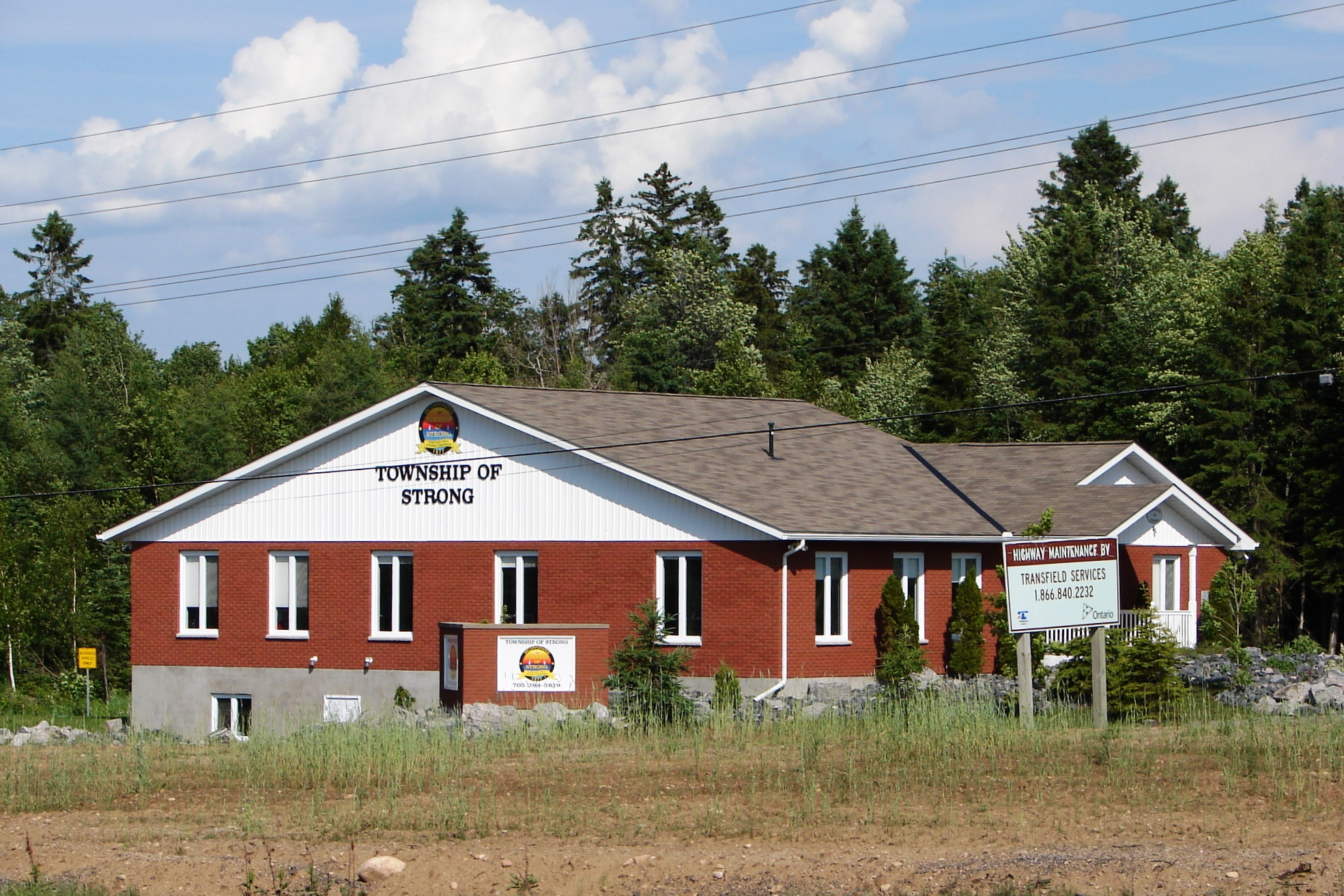
Municipal office near Sundridge

== See also ==
- List of townships in Ontario
