= Sundridge, Ontario =

Sundridge
- Village (single-tier)
- Village of Sundridge
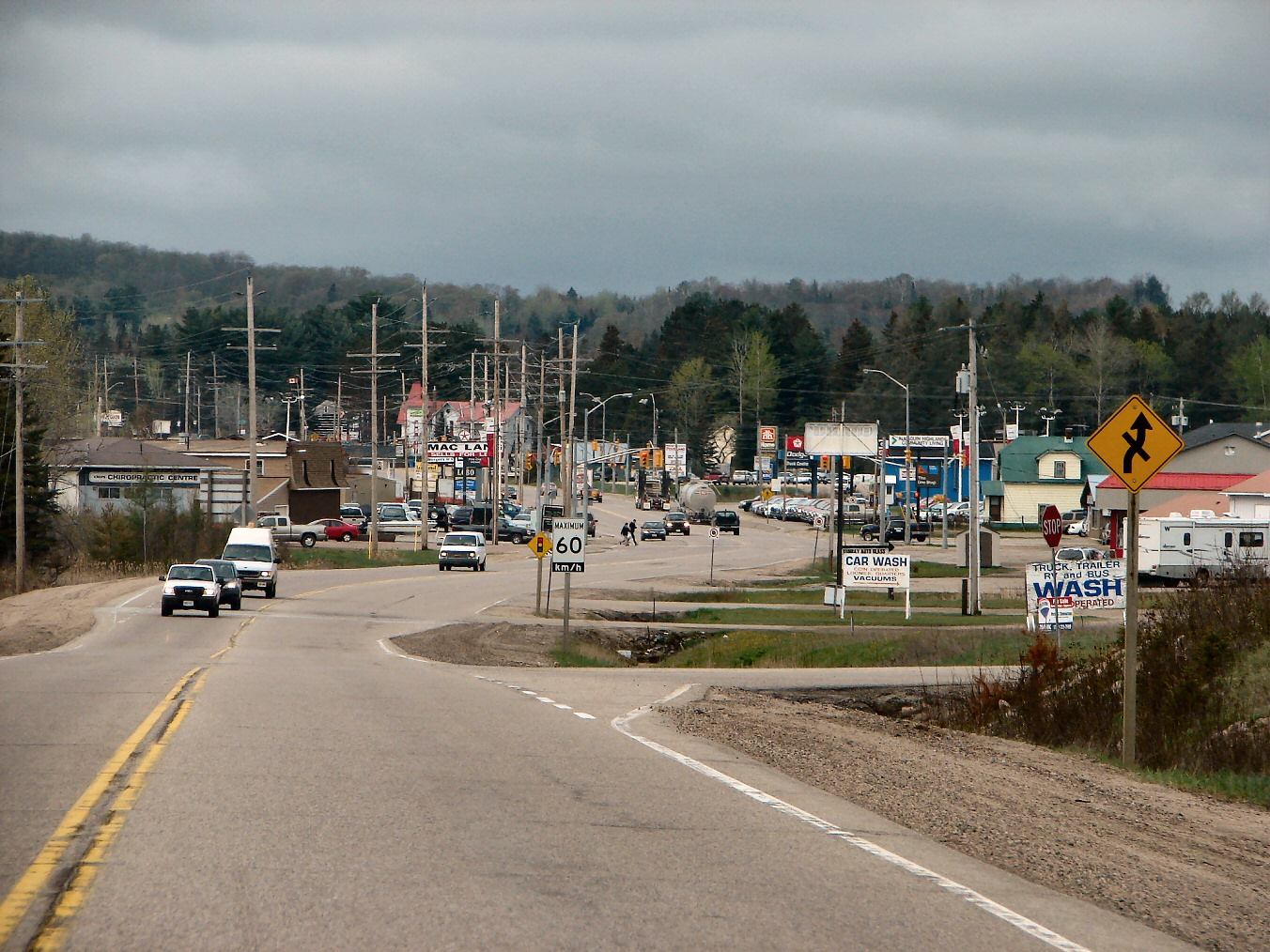
- Highway 124 through Sundridge close to Highway 11.
- Nickname: Sunny Sundridge
- Location within Southern Ontario
- Coordinates: 45°46′N 79°24′W
- Country: Canada
- Province: Ontario
- District: Parry Sound
- Settled: 1870s
- Incorporated: March 23, 1889

Government
  - Type: Village
  - Mayor: Justine Leveque
  - Fed. riding: Parry Sound-Muskoka
  - Prov. riding: Parry Sound—Muskoka

Area
  - Land: 2.25 km^{2} (0.87 sq mi)

Population (2021)
  - Total: 938
  - Density: 417.7/km^{2} (1,082/sq mi)
- Time zone: UTC−5 (EST)
  - Summer (DST): UTC−4 (EDT)
- Postal code: P0A
- Area code: 705
- Website: www.sundridge.ca

Sundridge is a village in central Ontario, Canada, approximately 75 kilometres (47 mi) south of North Bay along Highway 11, on the shore of Lake Bernard. The village is located in the Almaguin Highlands region of Parry Sound District.

Sundridge is a tourist destination in both winter and summer, with boating and snowmobiling providing the main attraction. Algonquin Provincial Park is accessible nearby. Cities within a reasonable driving distance include Toronto (approximately 275 km (171 mi) south) and Ottawa (approximately 400 km (250 mi) east). The village has long been known as "The Pearl of the North" to residents of central and northern Ontario.

== History ==
Originally it was supposed to be named Sunny Ridge, but when the name was applied for in the late 1800s, an error at the post office department resulted in the name becoming Sundridge. Another hypothesis is that it is named after a village in Kent, England.

Sundridge developed largely as a result of the extension of the Canadian National Railway (CNR) northward. The first settler in the area – usually considered the village's founder – was James Dunbar in 1876. The CNR route in the area was completed in 1885, and the Village of Sundridge was incorporated on March 23, 1889, when it separated from Strong Township.

Protestant churches (Anglican, Methodist and Presbyterian) were established in the mid-1880s, and in 1897 the first municipal library was established. During World War I, Sundridge was the location for basic training for the 162nd Canadian Battalion.

The post office dates from 1879.

== Demographics ==
In the 2021 Census of Population conducted by Statistics Canada, Sundridge had a population of 938 living in 436 of its 458 total private dwellings, a change of −2.4% from its 2016 population of 961. With a land area of 2.25 km^{2} (0.87 sq mi), it had a population density of 416.9/km^{2} (1,079.7/sq mi) in 2021.

Historical census populations – Sundridge, Ontario

Year	Pop.	±%
1901	357	—
1911	420	+17.6%
1921	423	+0.7%
1931	524	+23.9%
1941	506	−3.4%
1951	634	+25.3%
1956	697	+9.9%

Year	Pop.	±%
1961	756	+8.5%
1966	714	−5.6%
1971	723	+1.3%
1976	692	−4.3%
1981	734	+6.1%
1986	788	+7.4%
1991	937	+18.9%

Year	Pop.	±%
1996	1,019	+8.8%
2001	983	−3.5%
2006	942	−4.2%
2011	985	+4.6%
2016	961	−2.4%
2021	938	−2.4%

Source: Statistics Canada

Mother tongue (2021):

- English as first language: 93.5%
- French as first language: 1.1%
- English and French as first languages: 0.5%
- Other as first language: 3.8%

== Government ==
The municipality is governed by a five-member council consisting of a mayor and four councillors, each elected at large every four years. Many local services (such as the library and arena) are run by committees jointly established by Sundridge and its surrounding townships. The current mayor of Sundridge is Justine Leveque.

== Notable people ==
- NHLers Bill McCreary Sr. and Greg de Vries.
- Canadian author Mary Susanne Edgar, founder of Glen Bernard Camp.
- NHLer Bucko McDonald, there is a street named after him.
- Donald Roy Beatty (c. 1930–2010), was a Canadian football player and won the Grey Cup with Hamilton (1953)
