= Ontario Highway 522 =

Ontario provincial highway

Highway 522

Route information
- Maintained by the Ministry of Transportation of Ontario
- Length: 109.8 km (68.2 mi)
- Existed: 1956–present

Major junctions
- West end: Highway 69 near Cranberry
- East end: Highway 11 in Trout Creek

Location
- Country: Canada
- Province: Ontario
- Districts: Parry Sound District

Highway system
- Ontario provincial highways; Current; Former; 400-series
← Highway 520	→ Highway 522B

Secondary Highway 522, commonly referred to as Highway 522, is a provincially maintained highway in the Canadian province of Ontario. The highway is 109.6 kilometres (68.1 mi) in length, connecting Highway 69 near Cranberry with Highway 11 at the community of Trout Creek. Highway 522 serves as the only link between these two routes south of Highway 17 and north of Highway 124. It is often used to access Grundy Lake Provincial Park, a popular camping area for northbound travellers.

Highway 522 was established between Loring and Trout Creek alongside many other secondary highways in 1956. It was extended to the Pickerel River in 1965, but did not connect with Highway 69 until the mid-1970s. It was fully paved by 1980. In 2002, the Trout Creek Bypass opened, shifting Highway 11 around the town. Highway 522 was extended from its eastern terminus south to an interchange with the new bypass as a result.

== Route description ==
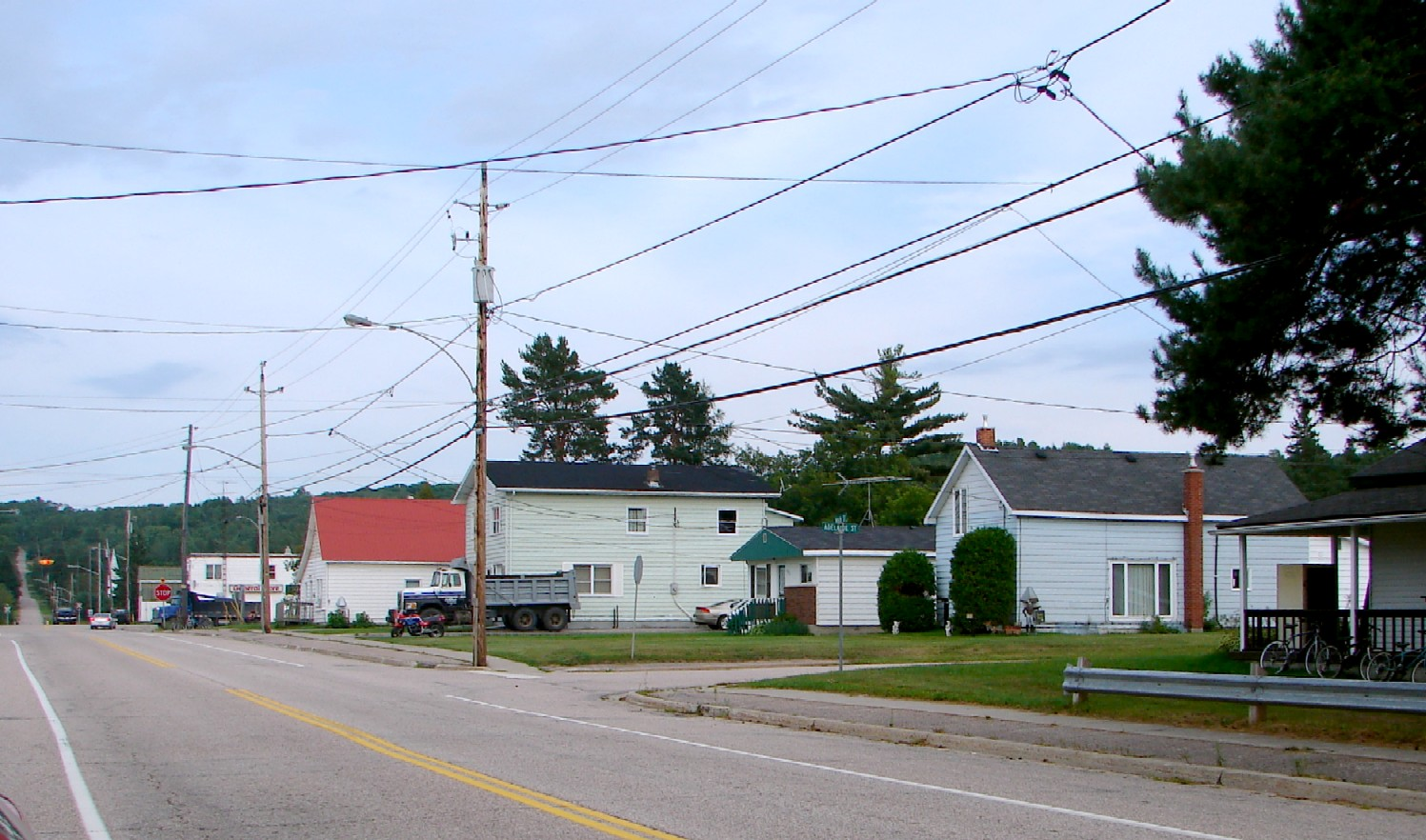
Highway 522 in Trout Creek. At the stop sign, drivers can continue on the highway by turning right, or can turn left onto Highway 522B; both end at Highway 11.

Highway 522 begins at a junction with Highway 69 in the community of Cranberry. This terminus will be upgraded to an interchange with the future Highway 400 in the near future. It travels east and provides access to Grundy Lake Provincial Park, then enters a mostly remote wilderness of the Canadian Shield, dominated by thick forest and rock outcroppings. The route services cottages along the northern shorelines of Kawigamog Lake, Little Long Lake, Wauquimakog Lake and Seagull Lake while passing through the communities of Pakesley, Lost Channel, Ess Narrows Landing, Fleming's Landing, Loring, Spring Creek, Port Loring and Arnstein.

Highway 522 continues through Golden Valley and Bear Valley, south of the Loring Deer Yard, before meeting Highway 524 at Farley's Corners. There the highway briefly curves southwards to Commanda, where it crosses the Commanda Creek and resumes its eastward journey. It passes through Gurd Township for an additional 20 kilometres (12 mi) before entering Trout Creek. Within that town the route is maintained under a Connecting Link agreement between Barrett Street and the junction with Highway 522B (Main Street) downtown. At that junction, drivers must turn south to remain on the highway. It continues another 2.6 kilometres (1.6 mi) to an interchange with Highway 11.

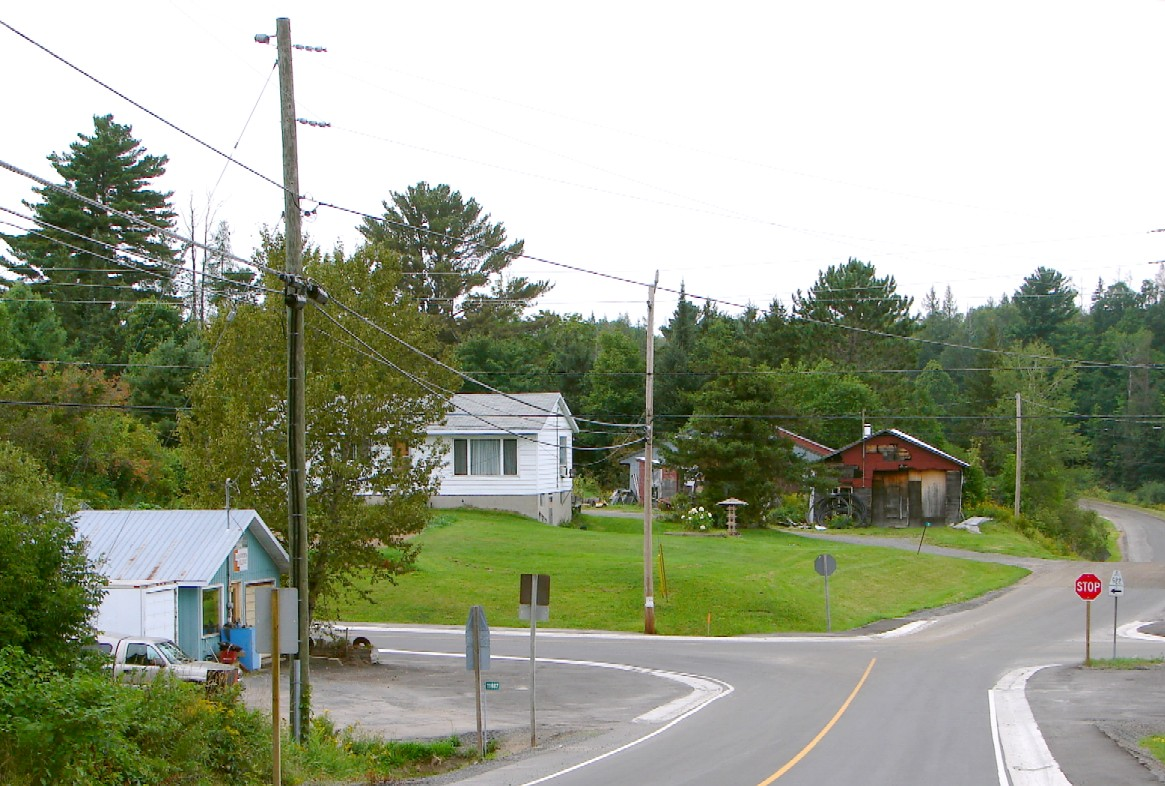
Highway 522 in Loring

Like other provincial routes in Ontario, Highway 522 is maintained by the Ministry of Transportation of Ontario. In 2010, traffic surveys conducted by the ministry showed that on average, 880 vehicles used the highway daily along the 24.0-kilometre (14.9 mi) section between Highway 11 in Trout Creek and the Commanda Creek bridge while 450 vehicles did so each day along the 47.0-kilometre (29.2 mi) section east of Grundy Lake Provincial Park, the highest and lowest counts along the highway, respectively.

== History ==
Highway 522 was initially designated in 1956, along with many of the secondary highways in Ontario. However, the route only travelled from Trout Creek as far west as Loring. It was paved into Trout Creek and between Loring and Arnstein, but a gravel road otherwise. The route was paved between Arnstein and Golden Valley by 1958, and to east of Commanda in 1961 Under the funding of a "day labour program", the route was extended west 21.4 kilometres (13.3 mi) along a gravel road to the Pickerel River at Kawigamog Lake on April 25, 1965. The remainder of the route between Commanda and Trout Creek was paved in 1966, and work continued to extend Highway 522 further west. The route was extended as a gravel road to Highway 69 at some point between 1974 and 1976. The remaining gravel sections, west of Loring, were paved in 1978 or 1979.

=== Trout Creek Bypass ===
In 2002, Highway 11 was re-routed along a recently completed bypass around Trout Creek. Highway 522 was then extended south by 3 kilometres (1.9 mi) along the former alignment of Highway 11, terminating at the new alignment of Highway 11 at Exit 301 (interchange with Highway 522 and McFadden Lane). The remainder of the former alignment of Highway 11 running north in Trout Creek was retained in the provincial system and renumbered as Highway 522B, terminating at Exit 306 (interchange with Highway 522B and Hemlock Road).

== Major intersections ==
The following table lists the major junctions along Highway 522, as noted by the Ministry of Transportation of Ontario. The entire route is located in Parry Sound District.

Location	km	mi	Destinations	Notes
Cranberry	0.0	0.0	Highway 69 – Sudbury	Trans-Canada Highway
Mowat Township	1.0	0.62	Grundy Lake Provincial Park Entrance	
Wilson Township	38.4	23.9	Rogerson Road	
Loring	47.8	29.7	East Road; North Road	
Farleys Corners	80.3	49.9	Highway 524 north – Carr, Restoule	
Commanda	85.4	53.1	Commanda Creek Bridge	
Trout Creek	106.4	66.1	Barrett Street	Beginning of Trout Creek Connecting Link agreement
Trout Creek	107.0	66.5	Highway 522B north (Main Street)	Highway 522 turns south at intersection; end of Trout Creek Connecting Link agreement
Trout Creek	109.6	68.1	Highway 11 – Barrie, North Bay; McFadden Line	Exit 301; boundary between Municipality of Powassan and Laurier Township
1.000 mi = 1.609 km; 1.000 km = 0.621 mi
