= Patterson Township, Ontario =

Patterson
- Geographic township
- Etymology: Named for Christopher Salmon Patterson
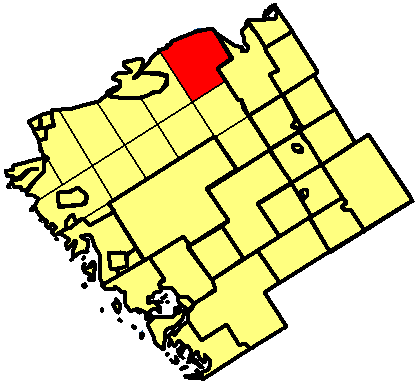
- Map of Parry Sound District highlighting Patterson Township

- Location of Patterson Township in Ontario
- Coordinates: 46°07′09″N 79°46′33″W
- Country: Canada
- Province: Ontario
- Region: Central Ontario
- District: Parry Sound
- Part: Parry Sound, Unorganized Centre
- Time zone: UTC-5 (Eastern Time Zone)
  - Summer (DST): UTC-4 (Eastern Time Zone)
- Area code: Area code 705

Patterson Township is a geographic township in central Ontario, Canada. As it is unincorporated, it is located in the Central Unorganized portion of Parry Sound District. The township is located where the French River flows from Lake Nipissing, and then stretches south until it meets Pringle Township in the south. It is bordered by Nipissing Township on the east, and by Hardy Township on the west. Patterson only has one community, that of Restoule. Most of its settlement is found in the southern region where Restoule is, and along the two lakes of the south, Restoule Lake and Commanda Lake. It is part of the Almaguin Highlands region.

There are also some cottages located on the south shore of Lake Nipissing, but the area has no permanent residences. There are approximately 300 people living in the township (415 including nearby Farleys Corners and Carr). Patterson Township is also home to numerous other lakes, which include Stormy (Patterson) Lake, Watt Lake, Bass Lake, Sand Lake, Shoal Lake, Satchels Lake, Crooked Lake, Baldy Lake, Beaudry Lake, Sandy's Lake, La France Pond, Seud Lake, Burnt Lake, Hagel Lake, Brimson Lake, Ibbitson Lake, Stinking Lake, Woodcock Lake, Hicks Lake, Bob's Lake, Kidd Lake, Smallpox Lake, Little Clear Lake, Tamarack Lake, Fairplay Lake, Porter Lake, McVeety Lake, Durrell Lake (part), Barton Lake (part), Upper Wiggins Lake (part), Lennon Lake (part) and the Rainy Lakes (Rainy Lake and Little Rainy Lake).

The Restoule River flows through the township, draining Commanda, Restoule and Stormy (Patterson) Lake. The township is also home to Restoule Provincial Park, located between Restoule and Patterson Lake and the French River Provincial Park located along the south shore of the French River and Lake Nipissing. Patterson Township has one provincially maintained highway, Highway 534.

== Etymology ==
This township in Parry Sound District was named in 1876 for Christopher Salmon Patterson (1823–93), a judge of the Ontario Court of Appeal, 1874–88, and of the Supreme Court of Canada, 1888–93.

== See also ==
- List of townships in Ontario
