= Ontario Highway 524 =

Ontario provincial highway

Highway 524

Route information
- Maintained by the Ministry of Transportation of Ontario
- Length: 4.6 km (2.9 mi)
- Existed: 1956–present

Major junctions
- South end: Highway 522 at Farley's Corners
- North end: Highway 534 near Restoule

Location
- Country: Canada
- Province: Ontario
- Districts: Parry Sound

Highway system
- Ontario provincial highways; Current; Former; 400-series
| ← Highway 523 | → Highway 525 |

Secondary Highway 524, commonly referred to as Highway 524, is a provincially maintained highway in the Canadian province of Ontario. The highway is 4.6 kilometres (2.9 mi) in length, connecting Highway 522 at Farley's Corners with Highway 534, which leads to Restoule. It was established in 1956, along with most of the secondary highway system in the province, and has remained unchanged since then.

== Route description ==
Highway 524 is a brief route connecting Highway 522 with Highway 534. It begins at Farleys Corners, and travels north alongside a farm, quickly curving to the northeast. The highway enters a forest, where it meets Commanda Lake Road; soon thereafter, it crosses the Commanda Creek.

After crossing the creek over a single laned bailey bridge, Highway 524 curves northwest, intersecting Weller Road, and follows the creek downstream. After following it for 1 kilometre (0.6 mi), the highway diverges to the northeast and exits the forest. Emerging into cleared fields, the highway meets Pilgers Road and turns northwest, briefly, before curving north. The highway ends soon thereafter in the community of Carr.

== History ==
Highway 524 was assumed in early 1956, when secondary highways were first designated with numbers. The route was a gravel road when it was designated, and was paved between 1978 and 1980. The route has remained unchanged since then.

== Major intersections ==
The following table lists the major junctions along Highway 524, as noted by the Ministry of Transportation of Ontario. The entire route is located in Parry Sound District.

| Location | km | mi | Destinations | Notes |
|---|---|---|---|---|
| Farleys Corners | 0.0 | 0.0 | Highway 522 – Port Loring, Trout Creek | |
| Pringle Township | 4.6 | 2.9 | Highway 534 – Restoule, Powassan | |
1.000 mi = 1.609 km; 1.000 km = 0.621 mi
