= Nipissing, Ontario =

Nipissing
- Township (single-tier)
- Township of Nipissing
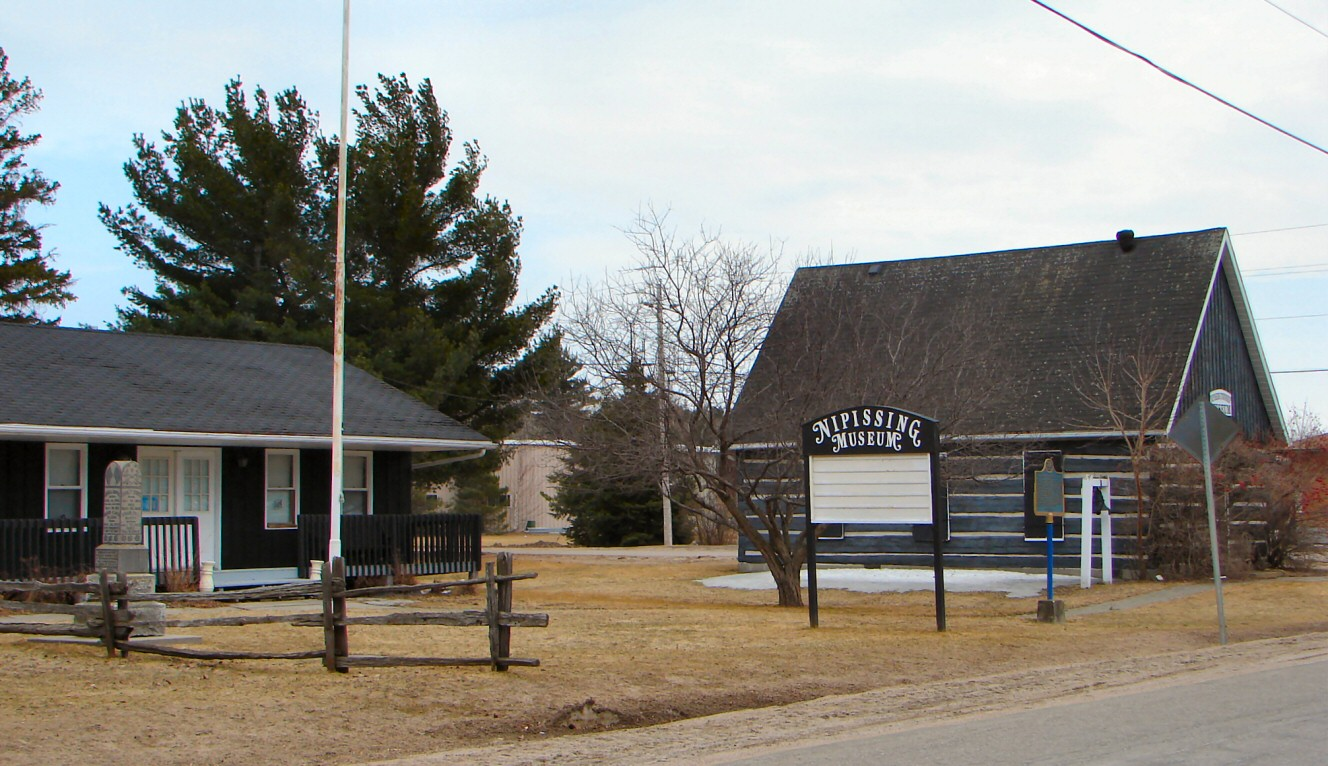
- Nipissing Township Museum
- Motto: Life the Way it Should Be.
- Location of Nipissing Township in Ontario
- Coordinates: 46°03′N 79°33′W
- Country: Canada
- Province: Ontario
- District: Parry Sound
- Settled: 1862
- Incorporated: 1888

Government
  - Type: Township
  - Mayor: Dave Yemm
  - Fed. riding: Nipissing—Timiskaming
  - Prov. riding: Nipissing

Area
  - Land: 387.95 km^{2} (149.79 sq mi)

Population (2021)
  - Total: 1,769
  - Density: 4.6/km^{2} (12/sq mi)
- Time zone: UTC-5 (EST)
  - Summer (DST): UTC-4 (EDT)
- Postal Code: P0H
- Area codes: 705, 249
- Website: www.nipissingtownship.com

Nipissing is an incorporated (political) township in Parry Sound District in Central Ontario, Canada. It is on Lake Nipissing and is part of the Almaguin Highlands region. Nipissing was surveyed between 1874 and 1881, and was incorporated in 1888. Among the first settlers in the area were the Chapman and Beatty families. Nipissing Township annexed Gurd Township in 1970. The township also contains a community named Nipissing, which is located on the South River near Chapman's Landing, on the South Bay of Lake Nipissing. The township administrative offices are located in Nipissing.

The township includes the communities of Alsace, Christian Valley, Commanda, Hotham, Nipissing, and Wade's Landing.

== Etymology ==
The township was named in 1879 after the lake, on whose south shore it is located. The community of Nipissing in the township, 25 km south of North Bay, was called Nipissingan in 1870, but its name was changed to Nipissing in 1881.

== History ==
The founder of Nipissing, John Beattie (John Beatty) arrived by canoe from Eganville in 1862. He was looking for land suitable for settlement. To lay claim to the property, he made brush piles, and was granted free land by the Government of Ontario. Around 1869, James Chapman and his wife, Phoebe Edwards, built their first house and barn at the top of the chutes that later took their name. The family farmed the area and James carried the mail by canoe, dog team and later horse on a route stretching 200 miles (320 km) between the villages of Magnetawan and Mattawa. The Chapman Valley and Chapman Township near Magnetawan are named after the family. James and Phoebe are among the pioneers buried in the Nipissing village cemetery. The Chapman family donated the land to the municipal government, and the landing became a municipal boat launch, public dock and swimming hole for village children.

Originally supplies were brought into Nipissing from Pembroke by canoe over the Champlain Trail, as well as the South River. Nipissing village became the main route for shipping supplies. Around 1875 a colonization road was completed which connected tiny Nipissing village to Rosseau near Parry Sound in the south and this created road travel and another route for shipment of supplies. An Ontario Historical Plaque was erected at the Nipissing Township Museum by the province to commemorate the Rosseau-Nipissing Road's role in Ontario's heritage. However, in 1886 the Northern and Pacific Junction Railway connected Gravenhurst to Callander cutting out Nipissing village from its main route and the life of the village as a key port began to fade.

== Demographics ==
In the 2021 Census of Population conducted by Statistics Canada, Nipissing had a population of 1,769 living in 746 of its 1,012 total private dwellings, a change of 3.6% from its 2016 population of 1,707. With a land area of 387.95 km^{2} (149.79 sq mi), it had a population density of 4.6/km^{2} (11.8/sq mi) in 2021.

Canada census – Nipissing community profile

	2021	2016	2011
Population	1,769 (+3.6% from 2016)	1,707 (+0.2% from 2011)	1,704 (+3.8% from 2006)
Land area	387.95 km^{2} (149.79 sq mi)	393.8 km^{2} (152.0 sq mi)	393.6 km^{2} (152.0 sq mi)
Population density	4.6/km^{2} (12/sq mi)	4.3/km^{2} (11/sq mi)	4.3/km^{2} (11/sq mi)
Median age	54.8 (M: 54.8, F: 54.4)	52.0 (M: 52.7, F: 51.2)	49.1 (M: 49.4, F: 49.0)
Private dwellings	1,012 (total) 746 (occupied)	1,051 (total)	993 (total)
Median household income	$83,000	$70,229

References: 2021 2016 2011

Historical census populations – Nipissing, Ontario

Year	Pop.	±%
1901	675	—
1911	660	−2.2%
1921	698	+5.8%
1931	683	−2.1%
1941	654	−4.2%
1951	589	−9.9%
1956	611	+3.7%

Year	Pop.	±%
1961	649	+6.2%
1966	564	−13.1%
1971	976	+73.0%
1976	1,195	+22.4%
1981	1,351	+13.1%
1986	1,358	+0.5%
1991	1,491	+9.8%

Year	Pop.	±%
1996	1,524	+2.2%
2001	1,553	+1.9%
2006	1,644	+5.9%
2011	1,704	+3.6%
2016	1,707	+0.2%
2021	1,769	+3.6%

2006 Population figure based on revised count. Population counts are not adjusted for boundary changes.
Source: Statistics Canada

== Transportation ==
The township is served in its northern part by Highway 534 and Highway 654, which connect east to Highway 11 at the communities of Powassan and Callander respectively; Highway 534 also connects west to Restoule Provincial Park, and via Highway 524 to Highway 522. The township is served across its southern part by Highway 522, which connects east to Highway 11 at Trout Creek and west to Highway 69 at the community of Cranberry.

== See also ==
- List of townships in Ontario
