= Ontario Highway 654 =

Ontario provincial highway

Highway 654

Route information
- Maintained by the Ministry of Transportation of Ontario
- Length: 23.1 km (14.4 mi)
- Existed: July 8, 1964–present

Major junctions
- South end: Highway 534 near Nipissing, Ontario
- Highway 94
- East end: Highway 11 at Callander

Location
- Country: Canada
- Province: Ontario
- Districts: Parry Sound

Highway system
- Ontario provincial highways; Current; Former; 400-series
← Highway 653	→ Highway 655

Secondary Highway 654, commonly referred to as Highway 654, is a secondary highway in the Canadian province of Ontario. The highway is 23.1 kilometres (14.4 mi) in length, connecting Highway 534 south of Nipissing with Highway 11 in Callander. The route was designated in 1964, and has remained unchanged since then. It is sparsely travelled, but paved throughout its length.

== Route description ==
Highway 654 begins immediately south of the community of Nipissing at a junction with Highway 534. This intersection, just north of the Wolfe Creek crossing on Highway 534, features a stop sign for traffic on Highway 654. The highway travels north from there through Nipissing, crossing the South River and passing the Nipissing Township Museum. As it leaves the community, the highway turns east and travels straight for several kilometres before making a broad ninety degree curve to the north while passing several pastures.

The highway travels north straight-as-an-arrow towards Lake Nipissing, with forests to the east and a mix of forests and pastures to the west. It turns east and crosses a muskeg approximately two kilometres (1.25 miles) south of the lake, then enters the municipality of Callander. As it travels eastward towards Callander Bay, the highway serves numerous residences and the occasional farm. It dips south to avoid the bay then encounters the southern terminus of Highway 94 before ending at an interchange with Highway 11. The road continues beyond Highway 11 as Lake Nosbonsing Road for several more kilometres, but this segment is not classified as a provincial highway.

The highway is 23.1 kilometres (14.4 mi) in length. Near its southern terminus it is lightly travelled, with an average of 1,000 vehicles using it per day. Traffic increases towards Highway 11, where almost 4,000 vehicles travel on an average day.

== History ==
Highway 654 was designated on July 8, 1964, following an already-paved road between Nipissing and Callander. Minister of Highways Charles MacNaughton ceremoniously planted the first reassurance marker on the route on that day. The route has remained unchanged since then.

== Major intersections ==
The following table lists the major junctions along Highway 654, as noted by the Ministry of Transportation of Ontario. The entire route is located in Parry Sound District.

Location	km	mi	Destinations	Notes
Nipissing	0.0	0.0	Highway 534 – Powassan, Port Loring	
Callander	22.7	14.1	Highway 94 (north) – Corbeil; Stone Road (south)	
Callander	23.1	14.4	Highway 11 – North Bay, Toronto	Exit 329
1.000 mi = 1.609 km; 1.000 km = 0.621 mi
