= Disappearance of Diane Prevost =

1966 missing child case in Canada

Diane Prevost
- Born: Diane Prevost; January 2, 1964
- Disappeared: September 17, 1966 (aged 2); Grundy Lake Provincial Park, Ontario, Canada
- Known for: Unsolved disappearance

Diane Prevost (born January 2, 1964) is a Canadian girl who disappeared from Grundy Lake Provincial Park in Ontario on September 17, 1966, at the age of two. Prevost vanished while camping with her family. An extensive search was conducted but investigators found no confirmed trace of her. Her disappearance remains unsolved.

== Case ==
Two-year-old Diane Prevost lived with her parents and three siblings in the Sudbury area of Ontario. On Saturday, September 17, 1966, the family went on a camping trip to Grundy Lake Provincial Park. Frightened of water, Diane played in the sand while her father fished and her siblings swam. Diane asked to return to the family's campsite, where her paternal grandparents were staying. The campsite was approximately 500 ft (150 m) from the beach. Her father agreed to take her back but while he was detangling a fishing line, she disappeared. Her family immediately began a search of the area. After about an hour, they contacted the Ontario Provincial Police (OPP).

Police and military personnel did an extensive search of the park and its surrounding waters. A large number of volunteers and high school students also participated. The North Star reported that the search was officially called off on October 4. Forensic artist Diana Trepkov released an age-progression portrait of Diane in 2009. For the 50th anniversary of the disappearance in 2016, the Canadian Centre for Child Protection made an appeal to the public for information. In 2018, the Ontario Provincial Police issued another appeal. In connection with that year's Missing Children's Month, Lise Nastuk released an open letter written to her sister Diane.

== See also ==
- List of people who disappeared mysteriously (1910–1970)
