= Ontario Highway 534 =

Ontario provincial highway

Highway 534

Route information
- Maintained by Ministry of Transportation of Ontario
- Length: 43.6 km (27.1 mi)
- Existed: 1956–present

Major junctions
- West end: Restoule Provincial Park
- Highway 524 – Carr; Highway 654; Highway 11
- East end: Highway 11 (Exit 316) in Powassan

Location
- Country: Canada
- Province: Ontario
- Divisions: Nipissing District
- Towns: Powassan, Nipissing, Restoule

Highway system
- Ontario provincial highways; Current; Former; 400-series
← Highway 533	→ Highway 535

Secondary Highway 534, commonly referred to as Highway 534, is a provincially maintained secondary highway in the Canadian province of Ontario. The route begins at the entrance to Restoule Provincial Park and ends near Highway 11 in Powassan. The route provides access to several communities which lay south of Lake Nipissing. Between those communities, the highway travels mostly through thick boreal forest. It was assumed in 1956, following its present course and remaining unchanged since. It is a lightly travelled route accommodating, on an average day, no more than 830 vehicles.

== Route description ==
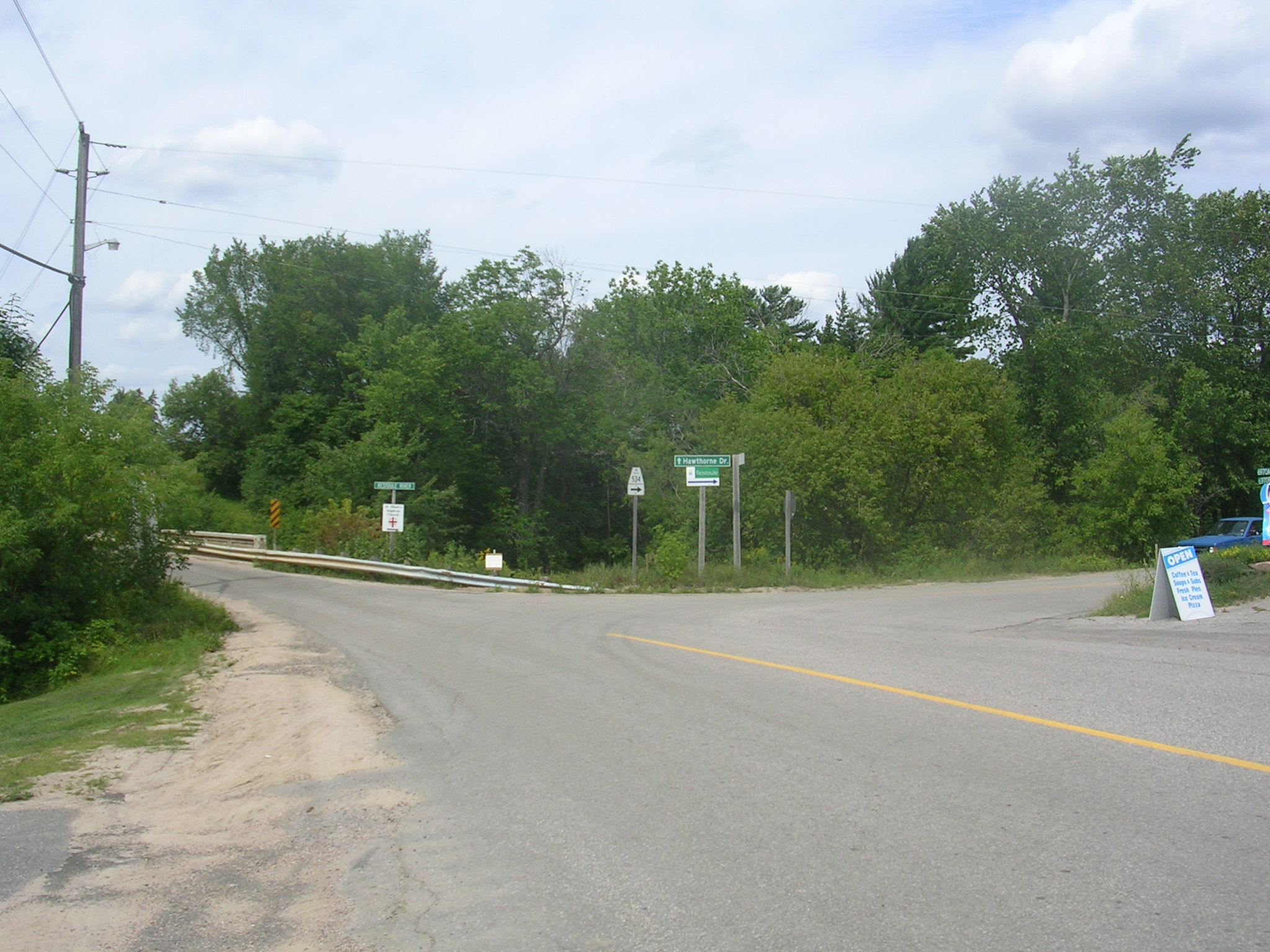
Highway 534 in Restoule, at the Restoule River bridge

Highway 534 begins in Restoule Provincial Park in Patterson Township. It travels south, curving along the eastern shore of Restoule Lake, south to the town of Restoule, where it then bends southeast and cuts through the northeast corner of Pringle Township near the community of Carr. Here it meets Highway 524, a short highway that travels south through Carr to Farleys Corners. From the junction with Highway 524, the route curves northeast into the Township of Nipissing. It passes through the community of Hotham before bending northeast to a junction with Highway 654 near the community of Nipissing. The highway then travels east through the community of Christian Valley and then Powassan, where it ends at Clark Street, east of the interchange with Highway 11.

In total, the highway is 43.6 kilometres (27.1 mi) long. The portion of the highway between Highway 524 and Highway 654 is part of the Lake Nipissing Circle Tour. The entire route is located within Parry Sound District. In 2007, the busiest section was between Highway 11 and Highway 654, which had an annual average daily traffic (AADT) count of 830, while the least busiest section was between Restoule and the western terminus, which had an AADT of 150.

== History ==
The current route of Highway 534 was first assumed by the Department of Highways in early 1956, along with several dozen other secondary highways. It was likely maintained as a development road prior to that. The route has remained unchanged since then.

== Major intersections ==
The following table lists the major junctions along Highway 534. The entirety of the route is located within Parry Sound District.

Location	km	Destinations	Notes
	0.0	Patterson Lake Road	Restoule Provincial Park entrance
Restoule	9.0	Commanda Lake Road	
	13.5	Highway 524 – Carr	
Nipissing	30.4	Highway 654	
Powassan	43.6	Highway 11 – Toronto, North Bay	Exit 316
1.000 mi = 1.609 km; 1.000 km = 0.621 mi
