= Stormy Lake (Ontario) =

Lake in Parry Sound District, Ontario, Canada

- Location within Ontario
- Location: Patterson Township, Ontario
- Coordinates: 46°4′47″N 79°46′29″W
- Primary inflows: Restoule River, Burnt Lake Creek
- Primary outflows: Restoule River
- Basin countries: Canada
- Surface elevation: 210 m (690 ft)
- Islands: Atcheson Island

Stormy Lake, also known as Patterson Lake, is located in the Almaguin Highlands on the northeast boundary of Restoule Provincial Park in Patterson Township, Parry Sound District, Ontario, Canada.

The lake is connected to Clear Lake, being only separated by an island, making Stormy Lake and Clear Lake essentially the same body of water.

== See also ==
- List of lakes in Ontario
