= Key Valley Railway =

Ontario logging railway

Overview
- Locale: Ontario, Canada
- Dates of operation: 1916–1935

Technical
- Track gauge: 4 ft 8 1/2 in (1,435 mm) standard gauge
- Length: 26 km

The Key Valley Railway was a logging railway built in Ontario, Canada. Opened in 1916, it ran 16 miles (26 km) eastward from the Canadian Pacific Railway (CPR) mainline at Pakesley, Ontario to the logging camp and mill at Lost Channel on the Pickerel River. The line operated until 1933, when plunging prices of wood during the Great Depression caused the company to enter bankruptcy. In 1935 the rails and rolling stock were sold for scrap while the locomotives were sold to other lines.

== History ==
In 1913, James Lauder, Joseph Spears and Lucien Howland of Toronto set up Palmer's Mill at Mowat on the CPR line in order to service land that John Schroeder had purchased in townships of Mowat and Blair. Schroeder, owner of Schroeder Mills & Timber Co. of Milwaukee, leased additional logging rights in the townships of Wilson, Ferrie and Brown, and contracted James Ludgate to haul the timber to the CPR on horse wagon. In 1916, Schroeder purchased the land outright from the Victoria Harbour Lumber Co., and to service this work, Lauder, Spears and Howland began construction of a new mill at Lost Channel.

When the mill was completed the company faced the problem of hauling the cut timber by horse, which could only be done efficiently in the winter when the roads froze and water could be poured on them to form ice and allow sleds to be hauled. Howland, a former General Manager of the Irondale, Bancroft and Ottawa Railway (IB&O), persuaded Lauder and Spears to build a railway, although his partners were sceptical. They purchased locomotive #3 from the IB&O (by this time known as CNR 4-4-0 #50) with plans to purchase a second from the Central Ontario Railway, which connected to the IB&O.

The hardscrabble landscape proved far harder to build on than expected, and the company was soon insolvent. The partners approached their bank for a further line of credit, which was initially received favourably. Shortly after, the banker met one of Schroeder's executives on the train platform at Pakesley. The executive suggested that the company would be willing to take over all of the existing debt if the bank would release all of their collateral. The partners then received the news that their credit would not be extended and that a large portion of their loans were being called in. Unable to raise the cash, the mill and railway became the property of the bank, who immediately sold it to Schroeder.

Schroeder handed the operations to Ludgate and the operations rapidly expanded. The completed line opened in 1916, running approximately 16 miles (26 km), as well as including a further 11 miles (18 km) of sidings at a large lumber yard they constructed at Pakesley. The railway also served Cole's Mill, about a mile from Lost Channel, as well as other mills on the Pickerel River that floated their lumber to the railhead.

The best pine had been cut by the 1920s, and in 1927 Schroeder sold the mill to James Playfair to produce hardwood. The mill burned in 1928, blamed on the saws overheating from cutting hardwood while being designed for softwood. The fire also burned down the locomotive shed next to the mill, destroying two locomotives. A smaller mill was built in its place and continued operations until 1933, when the effects of the Great Depression resulted in 40,000,000 square feet (3,700,000 m^{2}) of unsold lumber piling up in Pakesley, forcing the company into bankruptcy. The lumber was sold off for pennies on the dollar, and the entire operation sold for scrap. The 70 pound rails of the railway itself were lifted and sold for scrap in 1935.

== Route ==
The KVR wyed off the eastern side of the CPR lines just north of Key River, about 202 miles (325 km) north of Toronto. The CPR line runs almost perfectly north-south through this area. Curving to the east, the line entered the Pakesley switchyard, before exiting the yards to the east-southeast. Turning southeast, the line met the Key River and then turned east to follow it to Lost Channel.
