= Lost Channel, Ontario =

Lost Channel, Ontario can refer to:

- Lost Channel, Hastings County, Ontario
- Lost Channel, Parry Sound District, Ontario
