= Ontario Highway 522B =

Ontario provincial highway

Highway 522B

Route information
- Maintained by the Ministry of Transportation of Ontario
- Length: 1.9 km (1.2 mi)
- Existed: October 2002–present

Major junctions
- South end: Highway 522 in Trout Creek
- Highway 11 – North Bay
- North end: Hemlock Road (continues north as Hemlock Road)

Location
- Country: Canada
- Province: Ontario
- Districts: Parry Sound

Highway system
- Ontario provincial highways; Current; Former; 400-series
← Highway 522	→ Highway 523

Secondary Highway 522B, commonly referred to as Highway 522B, is a provincially maintained highway in the Canadian province of Ontario. The highway is 1.9 kilometres (1.2 mi) in length, connecting Highway 522 within Trout Creek with Highway 11 to the north. The highway was created in late 2002 when the Trout Creek Bypass of Highway 11 opened; Highway 522B forms a portion of the former routing.

== Route description ==
Highway 522B follows a portion of the old alignment of Highway 11 through the community of Trout Creek alongside a Canadian National Railway line. The highway begins at an intersection from which Highway 522 travels south and west. Highway 522B travels north on a slight angle to the grid layout of Trout Creek. After passing Morrison Street and Sweezey Street, it leaves the village and progresses towards the bypass alongside a swamp. After curving northwest, the highway interchanges with Highway 11. It ends shortly thereafter at Hemlock Road, onto which traffic is then directed north.

== History ==
Highway 522B was created as a result of a realignment of Highway 11, which has been upgraded into a freeway between Huntsville and North Bay. As part of this project, several bypasses have been constructed to avoid established communities along the route. Construction on the Trout Creek Bypass, an 8-kilometre (5.0 mi) segment of the Highway 11 project, began in July 2000 by Aecon. When the bypass first opened on October 3, 2002, Highway 11 was diverted onto the new alignment. The former route of Highway 11 through Trout Creek was renumbered by the end of the year; the section south of the junction with Highway 522 became an extension of that route, while the section north of the junction was designated Highway 522B. It was Ontario's newest highway designation until the opening of Highway 412 opened nearly 15 years later in the Greater Toronto Area.

== Major intersections ==
The following table lists the major junctions along Highway 522B, as noted by the Ministry of Transportation of Ontario. The entire route is located in Parry Sound District.

Location	km	mi	Destinations	Notes
Trout Creek	0.0	0.0	Highway 522 (Main Street)	Road continues south as Highway 522
Powassan	1.4	0.87	Highway 11 – North Bay	Exit 306
Powassan	1.9	1.2	Hemlock Road	Road continues north as Hemlock Road
1.000 mi = 1.609 km; 1.000 km = 0.621 mi
