= Pakesley =

- Dispersed rural community
- Etymology: Named for the Pakeshkag River
- Location of Pakesley in southern Ontario
- Coordinates: 45°54′51″N 80°31′18″W
- Country: Canada
- Province: Ontario
- District: Parry Sound
- Part: Parry Sound, Unorganized Centre
- Geographic Township: Mowat
- Established: 1908
- Elevation: 199 m (653 ft)
- Time zone: UTC-5 (Eastern (EST))
  - Summer (DST): UTC-4 (EDT)
- Postal code: P0G 1A0
- Area codes: 705, 249

Pakesley is a dispersed rural community and ghost town in geographic Mowat Township in the Unorganized Centre Part, Parry Sound District of Ontario, Canada. Located at the junction of Ontario Highway 522 and the Parry Sound subdivision of the Canadian Pacific Railway, it is named for the Pakeshkag River that drains the local area north to the Pickerel River. Formerly a station and passing track on the CPR, this portion of the line from Bala to Sudbury was opened to traffic June 15, 1908.

== History ==
From Pakesley, Lauder, Spears and Howland built a logging railway to their sawmill at Lost Channel in 1917. Owing to financial difficulties, the Key Valley Railway and the sawmill at Lost Channel was taken over by the Schroeder Mills & Timber Company, for whom James Lauder, Joseph Spears and L. B. Howland, had originally contracted to do.

At Pakesley, a lumber storage yard was established. The wood was stacked with spaces between the boards to allow air drying of the lumber, for 3 months to a year before it could be shipped. The lumber yard was said to have almost seven miles of railway siding.

At the site a post office, store, hotel, restaurant and an Ontario Department of Lands and Forests fire headquarters were erected. This was a watchtower and rangers station.

The original railway station was an old wooden box car, removed from its wheels and set on blocks near the tracks. As business grew, this was replaced with a two-story railway station also of wood construction, where the agent and his family slept. By 1924, the population stood at approximately 150 people. As there were more travellers, the CPR expanded their facility to a seven-room train station.

In addition, three boarding houses, two office buildings, stables and a warehouse were built. Not all workers lived in the boarding houses. Some workers built homes near the railway for their families. For the children, a school was built.

Like many one industry towns, it was boom and bust. When the pine was all gone, Schroeder, Mills & Timber Co. sold the Lost Channel mill to James Playfair & Co. of Midland. The operations continued, under the name Pakesley Lumber Company, producing hardwood lumber. Schroeder continued to operate the railway for the new firm, however, when fire destroyed the original Lost Channel sawmill in 1928, the flames quick spread to the adjacent engine house, taking with it two of the locomotives. A new smaller sawmill was constructed, which continued production during the depression.

With more than 40,000,000 feet of seasoned lumber stockpiled at Pakesley in 1933, all operations of the lumber company and the railway ceased. The lumber was disposed of and the rails of the Key Valley Railway were lifted by 1935 and the sawmill was removed by 1938. There are four original buildings remaining today, including the old school house and three homes which are still used as hunting camps and cottages. It is located on Highway 522, 4 kilometres (2.5 mi) east of Highway 69.
