= Pringle Township =

Township in Ontario, Canada

Coordinates: 45°56′22″N 79°42′39″W

Pringle is an unorganized geographic township in Parry Sound District, Ontario, Canada. It is topographically part of the Almaguin Highlands region, and is part of the census subdivision of Unorganized Centre Parry Sound District. The township includes the communities of Bear Valley, Carr, Farleys Corners and Golden Valley. Although not an incorporated municipality, the township is served by two local services boards: Bear Valley and Golden Valley are served by the LSB of Loring, Port Loring and District, while Carr and Farleys Corners are served by the LSB of Restoule.

The township is served by provincial highways 522, 524 and 534.

The Little Pickerel River flows from east to west through the township, and empties into the Pickerel River, which flows via the French River to Georgian Bay on Lake Huron. The southern part of Commanda Lake is on the northern border of the township; it is the source of the Restoule River, which also flows to the French River.

== Etymology ==
This township in Parry Sound District was named in 1879 for Robert Roderick Pringle, a Toronto lawyer and close friend of Timothy B. Pardee, Ontario commissioner of crown lands, who named the township.

== See also ==
- List of townships in Ontario
