= James Corkery =

Canadian long-distance runner

Personal information
- Born: 27 June 1889 Trout Creek, Ontario, Canada
- Died: 20 April 1964 (aged 74)

Sport
- Sport: Long-distance running
- Event: Marathon

James Corkery (27 June 1889 – 20 April 1964) was a Canadian long-distance runner. He competed in the marathon at the 1912 Summer Olympics.
