= Restoule River =

River in Canada

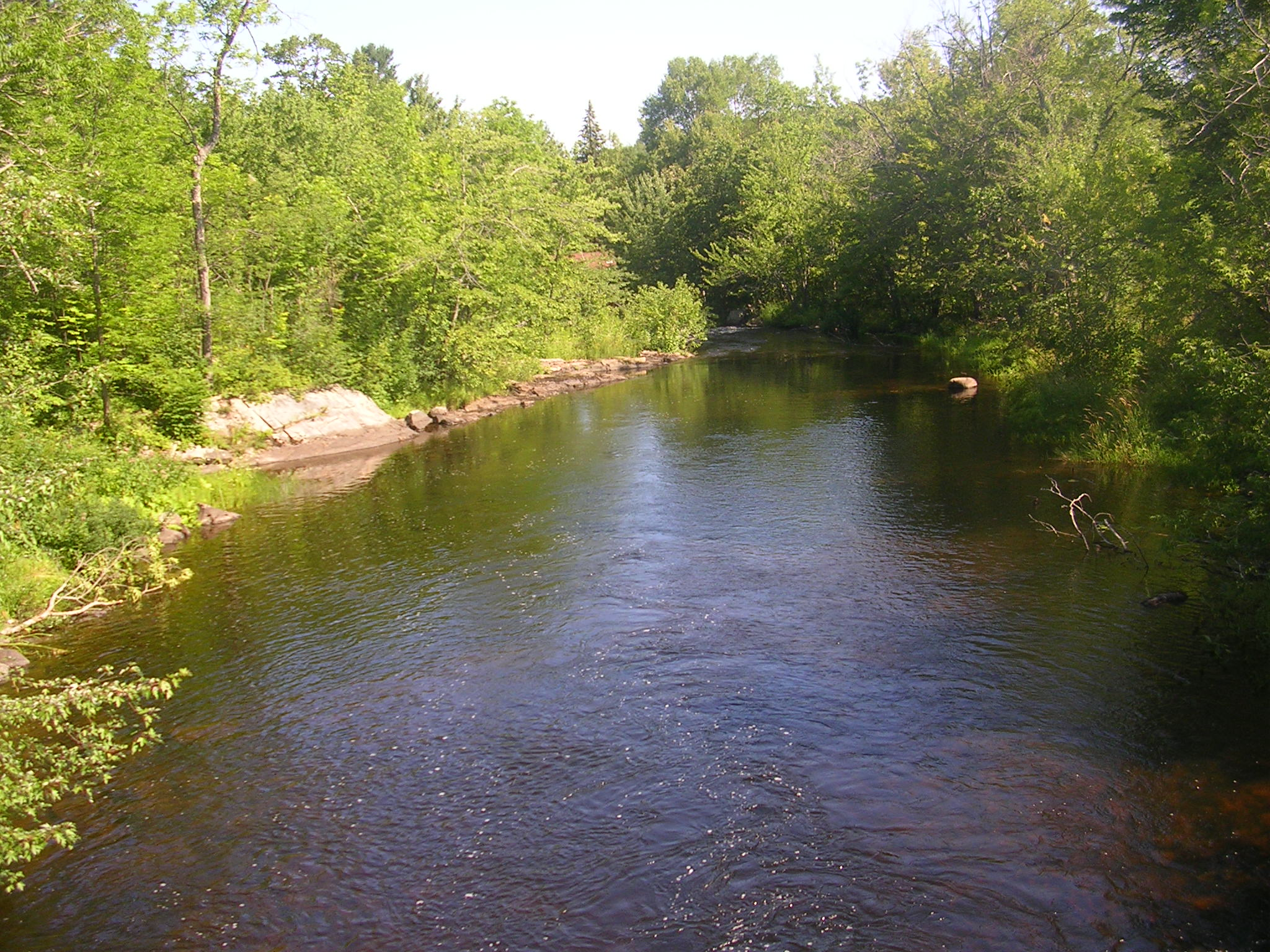
- Restoule River looking north from Hawthorne Drive in the community of Restoule

- Location of the mouth of the Restoule River in Ontario

Location
- Country: Canada
- Province: Ontario
- Region: Central Ontario
- District: Parry Sound

Physical characteristics
- Source: Commanda Lake
  - location: Restoule, Patterson Township
  - coordinates: 46°01′36″N 79°43′12″W
  - elevation: 222 m (728 ft)
- Mouth: French River
  - location: Hardy Township
  - coordinates: 46°06′29″N 80°01′03″W
  - elevation: 187 m (614 ft)
- Length: 40 km (25 mi)

Basin features
- River system: Lake Huron drainage basin

The Restoule River is a river in Parry Sound District in Central Ontario, Canada. It rises at Commanda Lake in geographic Patterson Township at the community of Restoule. It then flows north into Restoule Lake then north into Stormy Lake at Restoule Provincial Park, at the end of Ontario Highway 534. It then heads west into geographic Hardy Township to its mouth at the French River.

The total length of the river is about 40 kilometres (20 mi). From Lennon Lake in Hardy Township to the mouth, the river forms a boundary of the Dokis 9 First Nations reserve.

== Tributaries ==
- Portage Creek (left)
- Burnt Lake Creek (right)

== See also ==
- List of rivers of Ontario

== Sources ==
- Map 8 (PDF) (Map). 1 : 700,000. Official road map of Ontario. Ministry of Transportation of Ontario. 2010-01-01.
- Restructured municipalities - Ontario map #4 (Map). Restructuring Maps of Ontario. Ontario Ministry of Municipal Affairs and Housing. 2006. Archived from the original on 2014-04-10.
