= Ontario Highway 655 =

Ontario provincial highway

Highway 655
- Kidd Creek (Texas Gulf) Highway

Route information
- Maintained by Ministry of Transportation of Ontario
- Length: 74.7 km (46.4 mi)
- Existed: 1965 (Original length); 1979 (Current length)–present

Major junctions
- South end: Highway 101 in Timmins
- North end: Highway 11 near Driftwood

Location
- Country: Canada
- Province: Ontario
- Major cities: Timmins

Highway system
- Ontario provincial highways; Current; Former; 400-series
| ← Highway 654 | → Highway 656 |

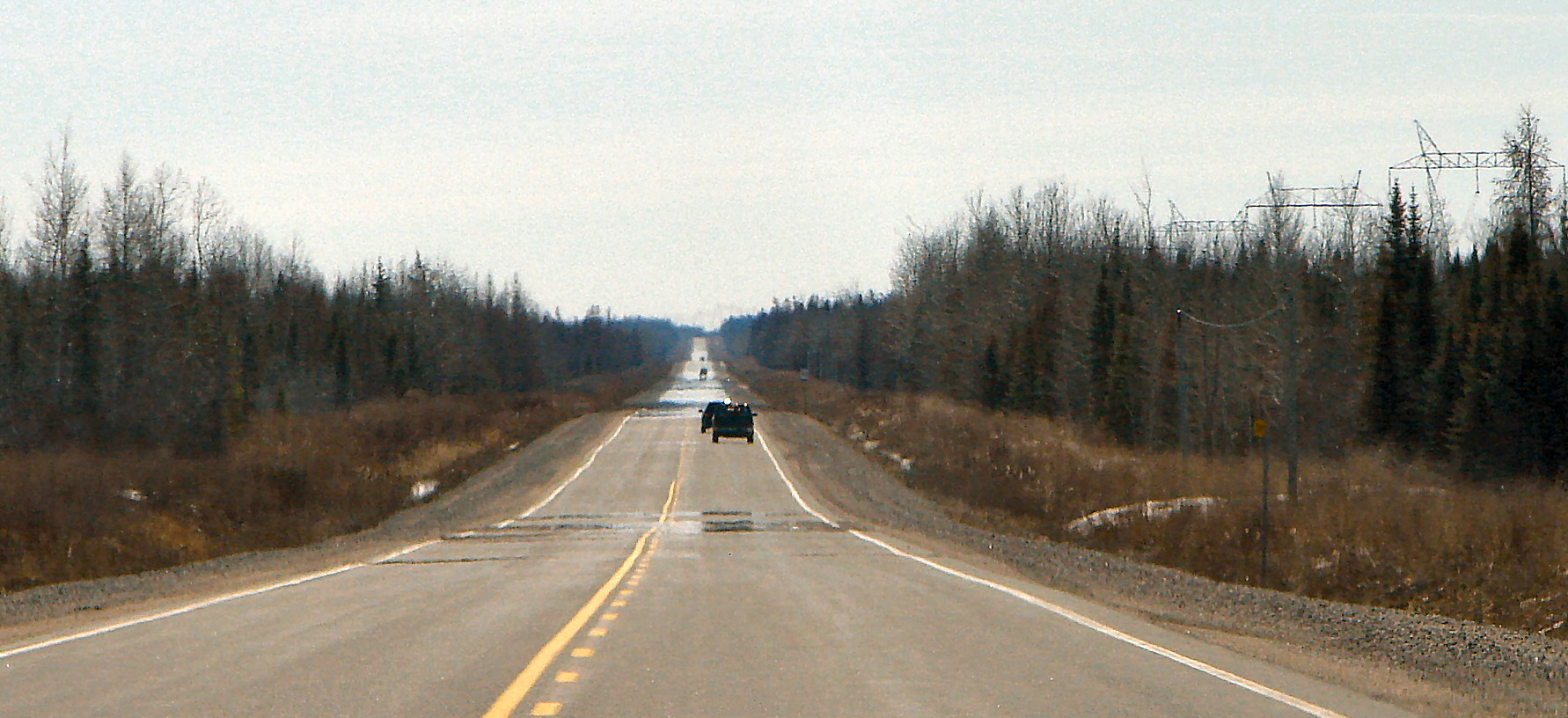
Highway 655 is straight...

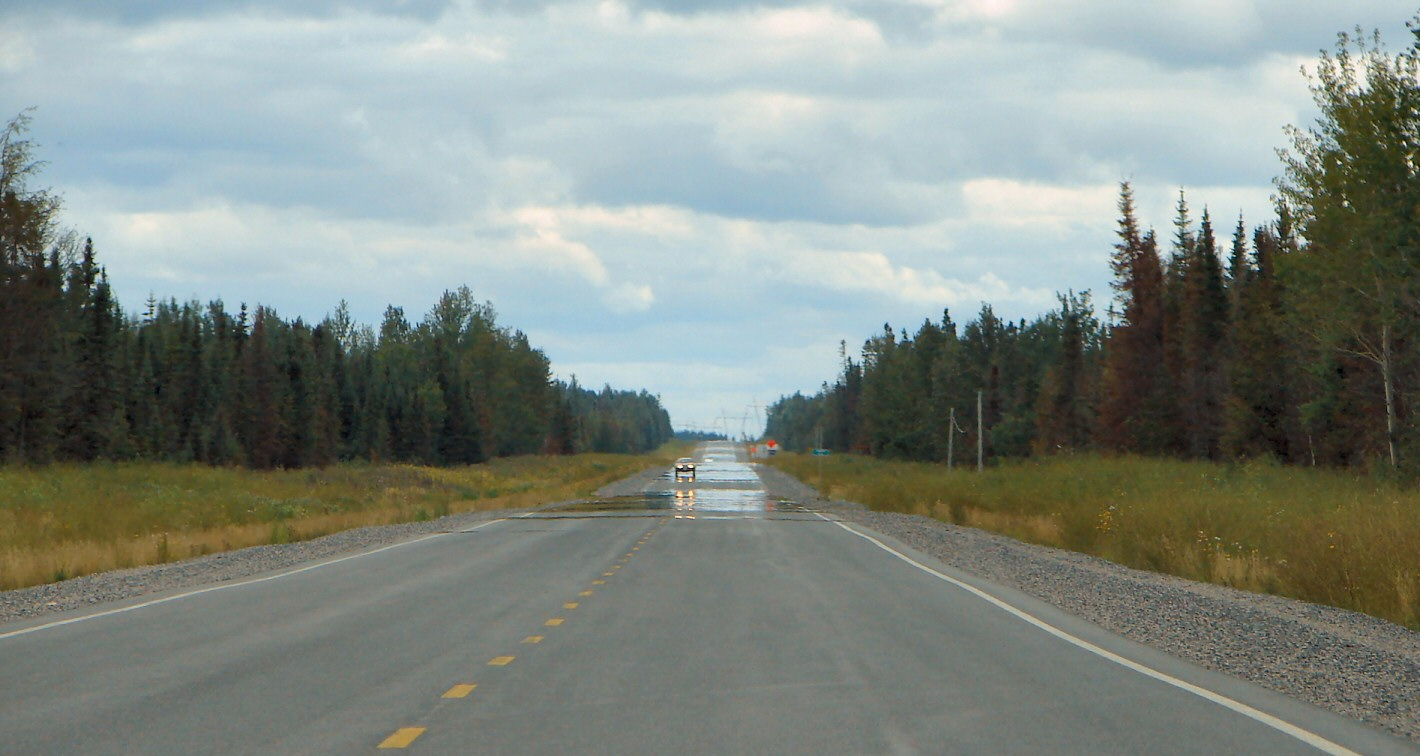
...and flat.

Highway 655 is a secondary highway in the Cochrane District in Northern Ontario. The route is 74.7 kilometres (46.4 mi) in length. It is heavily used by trucks as a critical access road to Timmins. The highway is one of the widest (by lane width), best-maintained secondary highways in the north (more comparable to a Kings Highway), and has the distinction of being Ontario's only secondary highway that features a 90 km/h (55 mph) speed limit, due to its importance and high design standards.

== Route description ==
Highway 655 begins at Highway 101 in Timmins, where it travels north, generally paralleling a high-voltage transmission line. Approximately 21 kilometres (13 mi) north of Highway 101, the route encounters the entrance road to the Kidd Creek Mine, and traffic must turn to remain on the highway. It then travels through a long and straight stretch for 53 kilometres (33 mi), isolated from any communities or services until it encounters Highway 11, southeast of the community of Driftwood.

Like other provincial routes in Ontario, Highway 655 is maintained by the Ministry of Transportation of Ontario. In 2020, traffic surveys conducted by the ministry showed that on average, 8,950 vehicles used the highway daily along the 1.0-kilometre (0.62 mi) section between Highway 101 (Algonquin Boulevard) and Ross Avenue in Timmins while 1,200 vehicles did so each day along the section north of the Kidd Creek Mine at Kidd Creek Mine Road, the highest and lowest counts along the highway, respectively.

== History ==
Opened in 1965, it was originally known as the Texas Gulf Highway, and ended at the entrance to the Texas Gulf Mining Complex. It was expanded from its original 7-kilometre (4.3 mi) length to its current length in 1979, creating a more efficient link between Timmins and northern communities along Highway 11 such as Smooth Rock Falls, Cochrane and Kapuskasing.

== Major intersections ==
The following table lists the major junctions along Highway 655, as noted by the Ministry of Transportation of Ontario. The entire route is located in Cochrane District.

| Location | km | mi | Destinations | Notes |
|---|---|---|---|---|
| Timmins | 0.0 | 0.0 | Highway 101 (Algonquin Boulevard) – Wawa, Matheson | |
| Timmins | 0.9 | 0.56 | Ross Avenue | |
| Timmins | 5.1 | 3.2 | Laforest Road | |
| Timmins | 21.1 | 13.1 | Kidd Creek Mine Road | To Kidd Creek mine; Highway 655 traffic must turn at this junction |
| Unorganized North Cochrane District | 74.7 | 46.4 | Highway 11 – Cochrane | Trans-Canada Highway |
1.000 mi = 1.609 km; 1.000 km = 0.621 mi

== See also ==
- List of Ontario provincial highways
