= Commanda Lake =

Lake in Ontario, Canada

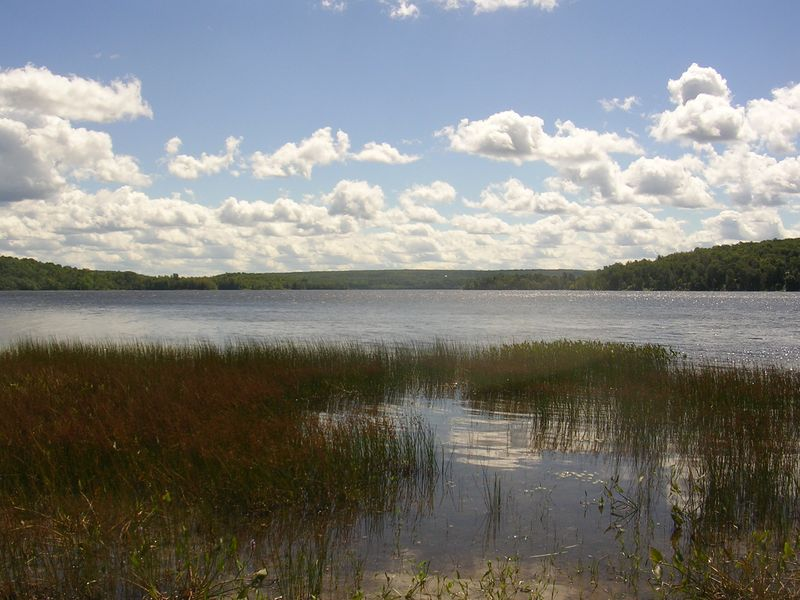
- View from Restoule

- Location within Ontario
- Location: central Ontario
- Coordinates: 46°1′N 79°42′W
- Primary inflows: Gee Creek, Commanda Creek, Beaudry Creek
- Primary outflows: Restoule River
- Basin countries: Canada
- Max. length: 5 mi (8.0 km), following lowest tip of lake to upper tip
- Surface area: 5.4 km^{2} (2.1 sq mi)
- Average depth: 85 ft (26 m)
- Max. depth: varies in seasons from 48–53 ft (15–16 m)
- Surface elevation: 222 m (728 ft)
- Islands: 1
- Settlements: Resoutle

Commanda Lake (or Lake Commanda) is a lake in central Ontario, Canada. Located on the border between Patterson Township and Pringle Township, in the Almaguin Highlands region of the District of Parry Sound, it is fed by Gee Creek, Commanda Creek and Beaudry Creek and is drained by the Restoule River. The Lake is shaped like the number "3", its middle spur is called Deep Bay. The lake is home to one permanent island, located off a point in its east. This is a mud bottom lake and its water is "tea coloured." On the north shore of the lake is the community of Restoule, but cottages line many of the shore lines. Crown land surrounds much of the lake shore. The lake has one public boat launch towards the southern end of the lake accessible on Commanda Lake Road. The lake is located at an altitude of 222 m (729 ft) above sea level. The lake is home to the Northern pike, Walleye, Smallmouth bass and Largemouth bass species of fish. Ice gets thick in the winter making this lake an all year round fishing lake.

== See also ==
- List of lakes in Ontario
