= Restoule Provincial Park =

Provincial park in Ontario, Canada

- IUCN category II (national park)
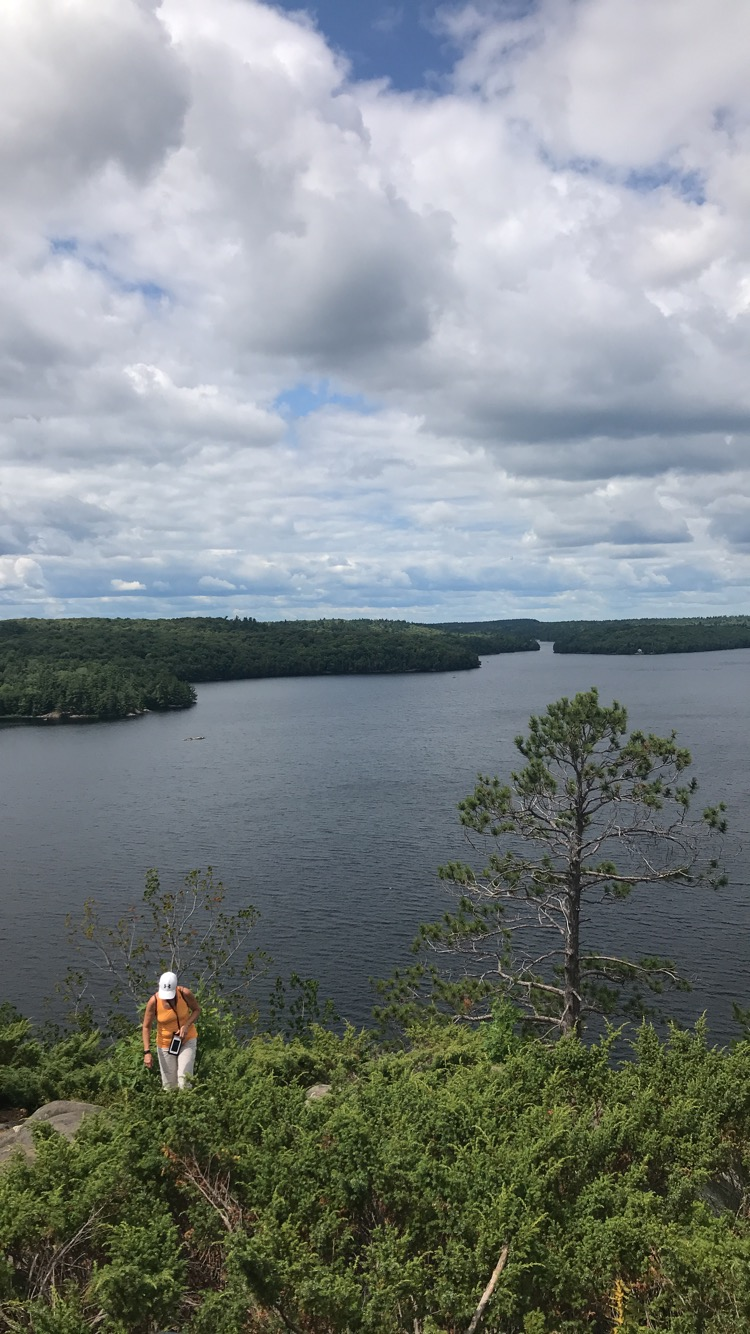
- Restoule Provincial Park in August 2019

- Location within Ontario
- Interactive map of Restoule Provincial Park
- Location: Ontario, Canada
- Nearest city: Restoule
- Coordinates: 46°04′02″N 79°46′24″W
- Area: 2,800 ha (11 sq mi)
- Visitors: 87,974 (in 2022)
- Governing body: Ontario Parks
- Website: www.ontarioparks.ca/park/restoule

Restoule Provincial Park is a provincial park in Parry Sound District in Central Ontario, Canada. It is located between Restoule Lake and Stormy Lake and extends along the banks of the Restoule River to its mouth at the French River (excluding the banks belonging to the Dokis First Nation) in geographic Patterson Township and geographic Hardy Township. The park is located at the western terminus of Highway 534 northwest of Restoule, Ontario. The park offers three hiking trails and is home to coyotes, wolves, bears, otters, pine martens, moose and one of Ontario's largest white-tailed deer herds. It is also home to over 90 species of birds including the peregrine falcon and the heron. Camping areas include Bells Point, Putts Point and Kettle Point. Many hike the well-marked trail to the 100-foot (30 m) fire tower overlooking Stormy Lake. It is one of two provincial parks found in the Almaguin Highlands.
