= Christopher Salmon Patterson =

Justice of the Supreme Court of Canada (1823–1893)

The Honourable Christopher Salmon Patterson
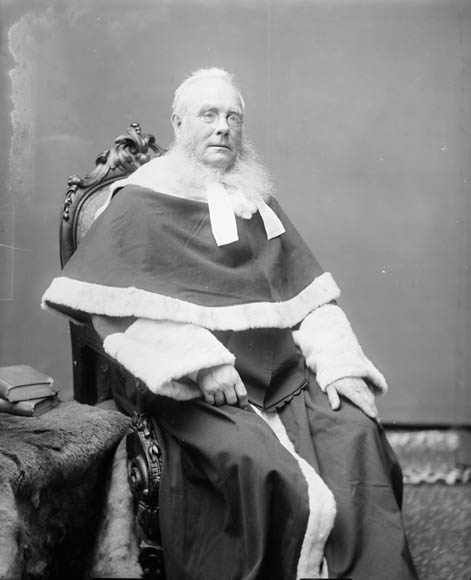
- The Honourable Mr. Justice Christopher Salmon Patterson, Jan. 1893

Puisne Justice of the Supreme Court of Canada
- In office October 27, 1888 – July 24, 1893
- Nominated by: John A. Macdonald
- Preceded by: William Alexander Henry
- Succeeded by: George Edwin King

Personal details
- Born: January 16, 1823 London, England
- Died: July 24, 1893 (aged 70)

Christopher Salmon Patterson (January 16, 1823 – July 24, 1893) was a Canadian Puisne judge of the Supreme Court of Canada.

Born in London, England, the son of John and Ann Patterson, he studied at the Royal Belfast Academical Institution in Ireland. In 1845, he emigrated to Picton, Canada West (now Ontario), Canada. He was called to the Canada West Bar in 1851 and moved to Toronto in 1856 and practised law. In 1874, he was appointed to the Ontario Court of Error & Appeal. Historian Ian Bushnell notes that Patterson had a willingness to be creative in his decisions and did not always seek out precedent to support his decisions.

In October 1888, Patterson was appointed to the Supreme Court of Canada to fill the seat of William Alexander Henry who died earlier in May. The decision to appoint Patterson of Ontario did not follow the tradition of regional representation which anticipated a justice from the Maritimes. Prime Minister John A. Macdonald and Justice Minister John Sparrow David Thompson felt there were no suitable candidates in the Maritimes, and Patterson was chosen for his skill and ideological belief favouring the federal government over provinces in constitutional matters. He served until his death in 1893.

Patterson Township, Ontario is named in his honour.
