= Sand Lake (Patterson Township, Ontario) =

Lake in Parry Sound District, Ontario, Canada

- Location within Ontario
- Location: Ontario
- Coordinates: 46°6′N 79°41′W
- Primary inflows: Beaudry Creek, Sand Creek
- Primary outflows: Sand Creek
- Basin countries: Canada
- Surface elevation: 230 m (750 ft)
- Islands: 25

Sand Lake is a lake in Patterson Township in the Almaguin Highlands of Parry Sound District, Ontario, Canada.

== See also ==
- List of lakes in Ontario
