= Bass Lake (Patterson Township, Ontario) =

Lake in Ontario, Canada

- Location within Ontario
- Location: Ontario
- Coordinates: 46°7′N 79°48′W
- Primary inflows: Sand Creek
- Primary outflows: Sand Creek
- Basin countries: Canada
- Surface elevation: ~ 190m (625 ft)
- Islands: 7

Bass Lake is a lake in Patterson Township, part of the Almaguin Highlands, Parry Sound District, Ontario, Canada.

== See also ==
- List of lakes in Ontario
