= Ontario Highway 94 =

Ontario provincial highway

Highway 94
- Highway 94 highlighted in red

Route information
- Maintained by the Ministry of Transportation of Ontario
- Length: 12.0 km (7.5 mi)
- Existed: June 16, 1937–present

Major junctions
- West end: Highway 654 near Callander
- East end: Highway 17 near Corbeil

Location
- Country: Canada
- Province: Ontario

Highway system
- Ontario provincial highways; Current; Former; 400-series
← Highway 93	→ Highway 101
Former provincial highways
Highway 95 →

King's Highway 94, commonly referred to as Highway 94, is a provincially maintained highway in the Canadian province of Ontario that serves as a southeast bypass of North Bay. The route begins at Highway 654, near an interchange with Highway 11 south of Callander. It connects with Highway 17 after passing near Corbeil, a total distance of 12.0 kilometres (7.5 mi).

Highway 94 was first assumed in 1937 to provide tourist access to the Dionne Quintuplets, whom lived near Corbeil. It was extended by several kilometres along the former alignment of Highway 11 when the Callander Bypass opened in 1987. Otherwise, the route has remained unchanged.

== Route description ==
Highway 94 is a 12.0-kilometre (7.5 mi) route that begins at Highway 654 south of Callander, adjacent to an interchange with Highway 11. The route travels north from there, somewhat parallel to the divided four lane Highway 11 to the east. Bypassing east of Callander, Highway 94 turns east at Lansdowne Street. It curves northeast and crosses Highway 11. Weaving east and northeast, the highway passes through an area dominated by thick forests, though residences regularly dot both sides of the highway. Straightening to an eastward orientation, the highway approaches Corbeil, but makes a sharp 90 degree curve to the north. After crossing railway tracks, the route continues north for 1.9 kilometres (1.2 mi) before terminating at Highway 17. Highway 94 is situated entirely within Nipissing District. The Highway is longer north-south than it is east west, but it is signed as an east-west highway.

Like other provincial routes in Ontario, Highway 94 was maintained by the Ministry of Transportation of Ontario. In 1989, traffic surveys conducted by the ministry showed that on average, 4,750 vehicles used the highway daily along the section between Highway 654 and Main Street into Callander while 3,300 vehicles did so each day along the section between Astorville Road and Highway 17 the highest and lowest counts along the highway, respectively.

== History ==
Highway 94 was assumed in 1937, after northern development routes came under the jurisdiction of the Department of Highways (DHO) following its merger with the Department of Northern Development. On June 16, 1937, the "Callander–Dionne's" road was assumed by the DHO. The primary purpose of the route at the time was to provide access to the home of the Dionne Quintuplets, the first set of quintuplets to survive past infancy, who caused a massive increase to tourism in the area. The only change to the route occurred when the Callander Bypass of Highway 11 opened in 1987, extending Highway 94 south from Lansdowne Street along the former alignment to a junction with Highway 654. The route has remained unchanged since then.

== Major intersections ==
The following table lists the major junctions along Highway 94, as noted by the Ministry of Transportation of Ontario.

Division	Location	km	mi	Destinations	Notes
Parry Sound	Callander	0.0	0.0	Highway 654 (Nosbonsing Road) to Highway 11	Highway 94 western terminus
Parry Sound	Callander	1.5	0.93	Terrace Road (south) / Main Street (north)	
Parry Sound	Callander	2.9	1.8	Lansdowne Street west / Callander Bay Drive north	Highway 94 turns east
Nipissing	East Ferris	10.0	6.2	Astorville Road	Corbeil
Nipissing	East Ferris	12.0	7.5	Highway 17 / TCH – North Bay, Ottawa	Highway 94 eastern terminus
1.000 mi = 1.609 km; 1.000 km = 0.621 mi
