= Pickerel River CNoR bridge =

Coordinates: 46.0017°N 80.7282°W

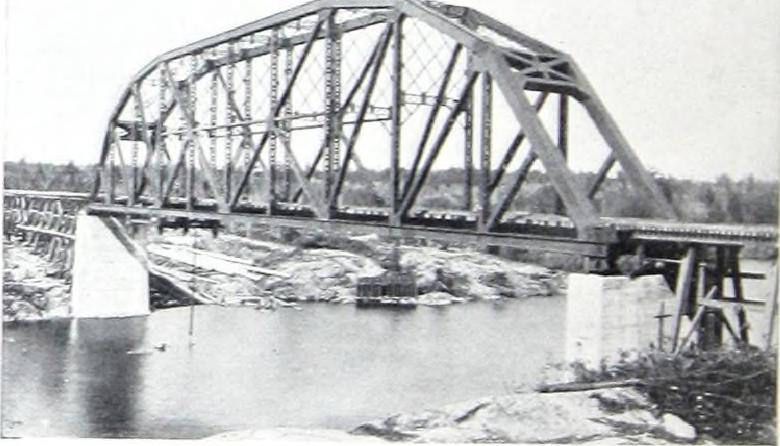
View of the bridge, shortly after construction

The Pickerel River CNoR bridge is a railway bridge over the Pickerel River in northern Ontario, built by the Canada Foundry Company circa 1906 for the Canadian Northern Railway.

As of 2014, the bridge is still in use by Canadian National Railway.
