= Grundy Lake Provincial Park =

Provincial park in Ontario, Canada

- IUCN category II (national park)
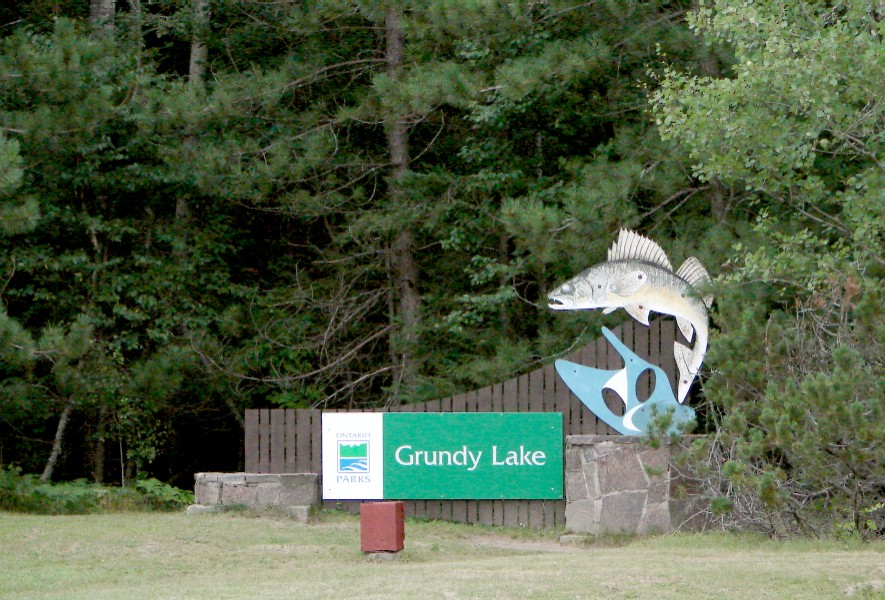
- Entrance to the park

- Location within Southern Ontario
- Interactive map of Grundy Lake Provincial Park
- Location: Ontario, Canada
- Nearest town: Britt
- Coordinates: 45°56′N 80°33′W
- Area: 3,614 hectares (8,930 acres)
- Established: 1959
- Visitors: 156,316 (in 2022)
- Governing body: Ontario Parks
- Website: www.ontarioparks.ca/park/grundylake

Grundy Lake Provincial Park is a natural environment park in Ontario, Canada, established in 1959, and part of the Ontario Parks system. The park is located near Britt, at the junction of Highway 69 and Highway 522.

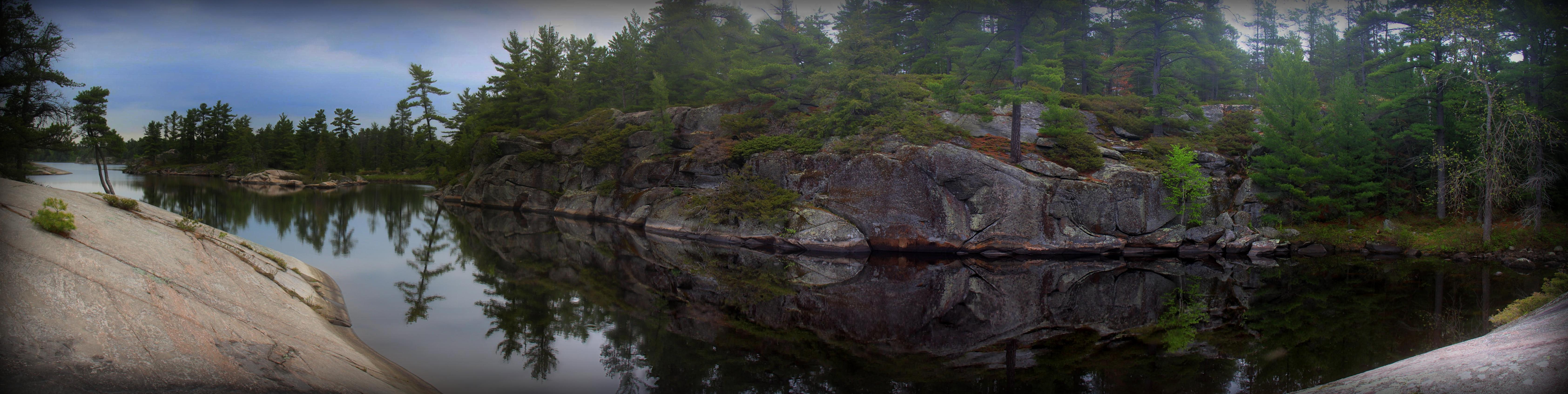

Walking trails include sections of boardwalk. Wildlife includes great blue herons and on the geology front there are rocks from the precambrian shield.
