= Restoule =

- Designated place with Local Services Board
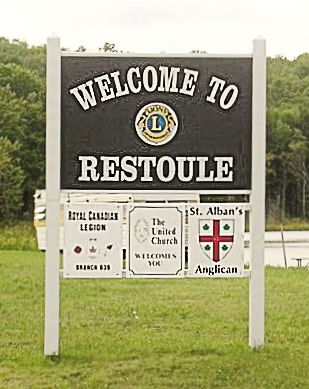
- Restoule welcome sign

- Seal

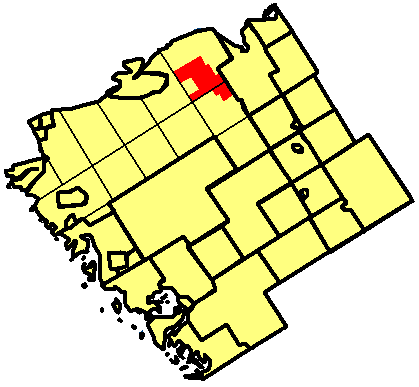
- Location of Restoule Local Services Board in Parry Sound District

- Location of Restoule in Ontario
- Coordinates: 46°01′40″N 79°43′08″W
- Country: Canada
- Province: Ontario
- District: Parry Sound

Government
  - Chair: Burkhard Porter
  - Governing body: Restoule Local Services Board
  - MPs: Scott Aitchison
  - MPPs: Graydon Smith

Area
  - Total: 122.42 km^{2} (47.27 sq mi)
- Elevation: 235 m (771 ft)

Population (2021)
  - Total: 502
  - Density: 4.1/km^{2} (11/sq mi)
- Canada 2021 Census
- Time zone: UTC-5 (Eastern (EST))

Restoule is a community and designated place in geographic Patterson Township in the Centre Unorganized Part of Parry Sound District in Central Ontario, Canada. It is situated on the Restoule River between Commanda Lake, and Restoule Lake and is part of the Almaguin Highlands region.

Restoule has a local services board that covers the main community of Restoule and the small communities of Carr and Farley's Corners in neighbouring geographic Pringle Township. Along with the nearby communities of Loring and Port Loring and other smaller hamlets, the area promotes itself as the Loring-Restoule tourist area.

Restoule is located south of Lake Nipissing, and north of Ontario's famous cottage country. Despite being north of this area, Restoule is a major centre for cottages, as is the entire Loring-Restoule region. Due to location and distance from Toronto, Restoule is not as popular as regions such as Muskoka to the south. The largest nearby city is North Bay 65 kilometres by road northeast of Restoule.

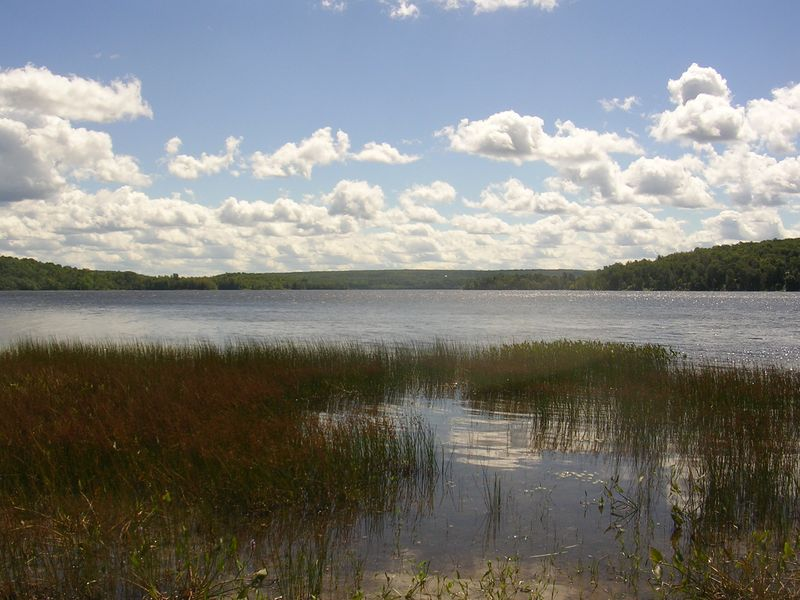
View of Commanda Lake from a cottage in Restoule

Restoule is located on Ontario Highway 534 and is a 9 kilometre drive southeast of Restoule Provincial Park. There is only one way to get into Restoule, and that's on Highway 534 from the east. There's a secondary route from the west from Dokis territory and leads into town on Hawthorne Rd. Entering the village, one can see the main General Store off the highway on the right. The main centre of the community however can be found off Highway 534, across the Restoule River. On this side of the river, there is a Royal Canadian Legion (Branch #639), a Lion's Club, Community Centre, Outdoor Hockey Rink, Play structures, and a United Church. There is a Pentecostal Corner Gospel Church 5 km east of the village at the intersection of Hwys. 524 and 534. There are several housekeeping cottages, camps and lodges.

Cottages dot the shores of both Restoule Lake north of town and Commanda Lake south of town. Also dotting the rolling countryside are various farms. Most of all, the scenery is dominated by majestic forests on the Canadian Shield.

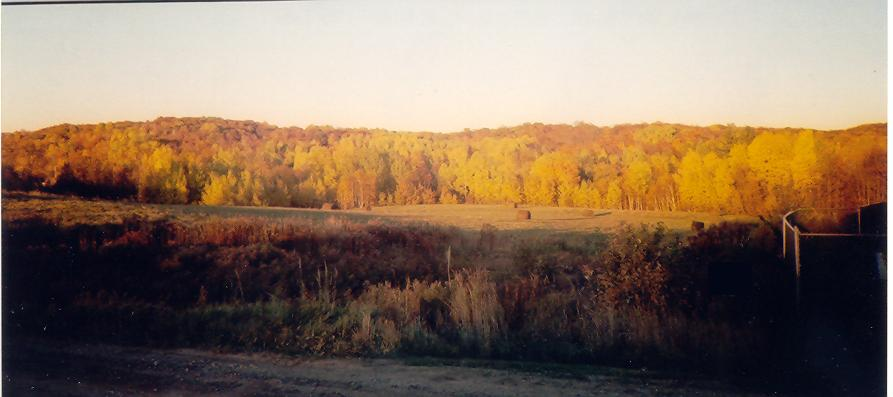
Restoule country side in autumn

Restoule residents elect three local government organizations to manage their affairs: The Restoule Local Services Board, Patterson Township Local Roads Board and Restoule Sanitary Landfill Committee.

Restoule has broadband Internet access and cell phone service provided by Bell. As of August 2020, there is Fido/Rogers coverage (albeit 'roaming') in the area, including at nearby Restoule Provincial Park.

== Education ==
The community had a public school from 1888 to 1992. The first iteration of the school was a one-room log schoolhouse. In 1912, it had expanded to a larger frame school house. A brick school house was built in 1956. When it shut its doors, the school had only 20 students and one teacher, and served grades 1 to 6. It was amalgamated with Nipissing Central and South Himsworth schools.

== Etymology ==
This place in Parry Sound District, 36.1 km west of Powassan, was named in 1878 after Ojibwa chief Joseph Restoule, who was still alive when the postmaster provided details to the chief geographer of Canada in 1905.

== Other places of the same name in Ontario ==
There is also a geographic Restoule Township in Algoma District, Ontario, on the Algoma Central Railway.

== Demographics ==
In the 2021 Census of Population conducted by Statistics Canada, Restoule had a population of 502 living in 252 of its 559 total private dwellings, a change of 10.3% from its 2016 population of 455. With a land area of 122.01 km^{2} (47.11 sq mi), it had a population density of 4.1/km^{2} (10.7/sq mi) in 2021.

According to the Canada 2016 Census:

- Population: 455
- % Change (2011-2016): +3.4
- Dwellings: 539
- Area (km²): 125.64
- Density (persons per km²): 3.6

== Notable residents ==
- Frances Lankin, Canadian senator and former NDP Member of Provincial Parliament.
- Jess Larochelle, Canadian war hero who was severely wounded in the War in Afghanistan in 2006 and awarded the Star of Military Valour.

== Politics ==
Politically, Restoule, as with most of rural Parry Sound District leans Conservative.
