= Lost Channel, Parry Sound District, Ontario =

Coordinates: 45.896074°N 80.319434°W

Lost Channel is a ghost town in Parry Sound District, Ontario.

== Establishment ==
Lauder, Spears and Howland of Toronto began producing lumber under contract to the Schroeder Mills & Timber Co., of Milwaukee, Wisconsin. In the spring of 1917, they built a large sawmill on Kawigamog Lake, a widening of the Pickerel River. The firm intended to transport the lumber with horses, along a rough road to Pakesley, on the Canadian Pacific Railway (CPR), 10 1/2 miles (16.9 km) to the west.

Initially, Messrs. Lauder, Spears and Howland, had established their operation in 1913 at Palmer's mill, on the CNR at Mowat, after John Schroeder had acquired standing timber in the townships of Mowat and Blair. Another mill near Mowat was Cole's, up on Key Lake, some twelve miles (19 km) from the railway.

In the summer of 1913, Schroeder made arrangements for logging in the townships of Wilson, Ferrie and Brown. He then contracted James Ludgate to take out the timber. Ludgate made his headquarters at Salines, later known as Drocourt. It was not until the autumn of 1916 that Schroeder Mills & Timber Co. purchased outright, the 138 square miles (360 km^{2}) of timber berths in Mowat and Blair, from the Victoria Harbour Lumber Co. It was following this purchase, that Lauder, Spears and Howland began construction of the new mill at Lost Channel.

== Railway construction ==
After the mill was completed, Mr. Howland persuaded his partners to build a railway, to carry the sawn lumber to the CPR at Pakesley, although James Lauder and Joseph Spears thought the operation would run just as well without that additional expense. Lucien B. Howland was the former General Manager of the Irondale, Bancroft and Ottawa Railway, built by his father-in-law, the late Charles J. Pusey. The relationship of these three men can be traced back to 1909, when Lauder and Spears, leased the mill of the Wilberforce Lumber Company, at Wilberforce a station on the IB&O.

The first locomotive on the Key Valley Railway, from Pakesley to Lost Channel, was CNR 4-4-0 No. 50, (formerly IB&O No. 3), acquired from Canadian Northern in 1917. Arrangements were made to purchase a second locomotive from Canadian Northern, also of the 4-4-0 wheel arrangement, former Central Ontario Railway No. 39.

== Financial issues ==
Before the railway was completed, however, Lauder Spears and Howland were experiencing financial difficulties. It seems the railway cost several times more to build than had been estimated. When they applied to the bank for additional funds to complete the project, a representative was sent up to make a report on the situation.

The bank representative was impressed after examining the whole operation, and advised the partners his report would be favourable, and would definitely recommend that their line of credit be extended. During the long wait for the southbound train at Pakesley, an executive of Schroeder Mills & Timber Co. advised the banker that his company would assume responsibility for the loan, if in turn the bank would transfer to them all of Lauder, Spears and Howland's assets, held by the bank as collateral. A few days later the bank informed Lauder, Spears and Howland that their line of credit would not be extended. In addition they were ordered to repay a sizeable portion of their bank loan within 30 days. The partners tried frantically to raise enough money to satisfy the bank. Unable to do so, Lauder, Spears and Howland, were swept aside - ruined men.

== New management ==
Schroeder Mills & Timber Co. subsequently took over the sawmill and the railway, promoting James Ludgate as manager. In addition to the mill and railway, Lost Channel grew to contain a bunkhouse, cookery, hospital, school and single dwellings for the workmen.

The Key Valley Railway was more than a logging railway as it carried mostly lumber from the mill, out to Pakesley, much of that was stored there to dry, before shipping. There was said to be almost seven miles (11 km) of siding in the lumber yard. They hauled camp supplies in from the CPR by the carload. The railway also served Cole's mill, about a mile out of Lost Channel and carried lumber produced at George Bruce's mill and others, brought to the Channel from up the lake. About 8 locomotives were used on the railway at different times and there was a truck mounted on flanged wheels, outfitted with bench seats to transport the workmen.

Logs from the township of Brown, on the Still River, and Ferrie, on the Magnetawan, were either boomed and towed to Victoria Harbour, from Byng Inlet, or placed on flat cars and delivered by the CPR to Pakesley. Schroeder had also purchased the #3 mill at Victoria Harbour and lumber was produced and marketed from there.

== Fire damage ==
By 1927 the pine in this region had been depleted when James Playfair & Co. of Midland, along with George Bruce, acquired the mill from Schroeder. The Pakesley Lumber Co. resumed the operations at Lost Channel, manufacturing hardwood lumber. Heat from the saws of a mill originally designed to cut softwood, is blamed for the 1928 fire that consumed the mill and quickly spread to the adjacent engine house, taking with it two locomotives and a stationary boiler.

A new smaller mill was erected and the operations continued. When the depression struck, Pakesley Lumber Co. decided to continue to operate and ride out the market slump. With more than 40,000,000 feet (12,000,000 m) of seasoned lumber stockpiled at Pakesley, the mill was forced to shut down in 1933. The stock was sold off at less than wholesale prices. The mill was dismantled and sold and the rails of the Key Valley Railway were lifted in 1935.
