= Trout Creek, Ontario =

Trout Creek
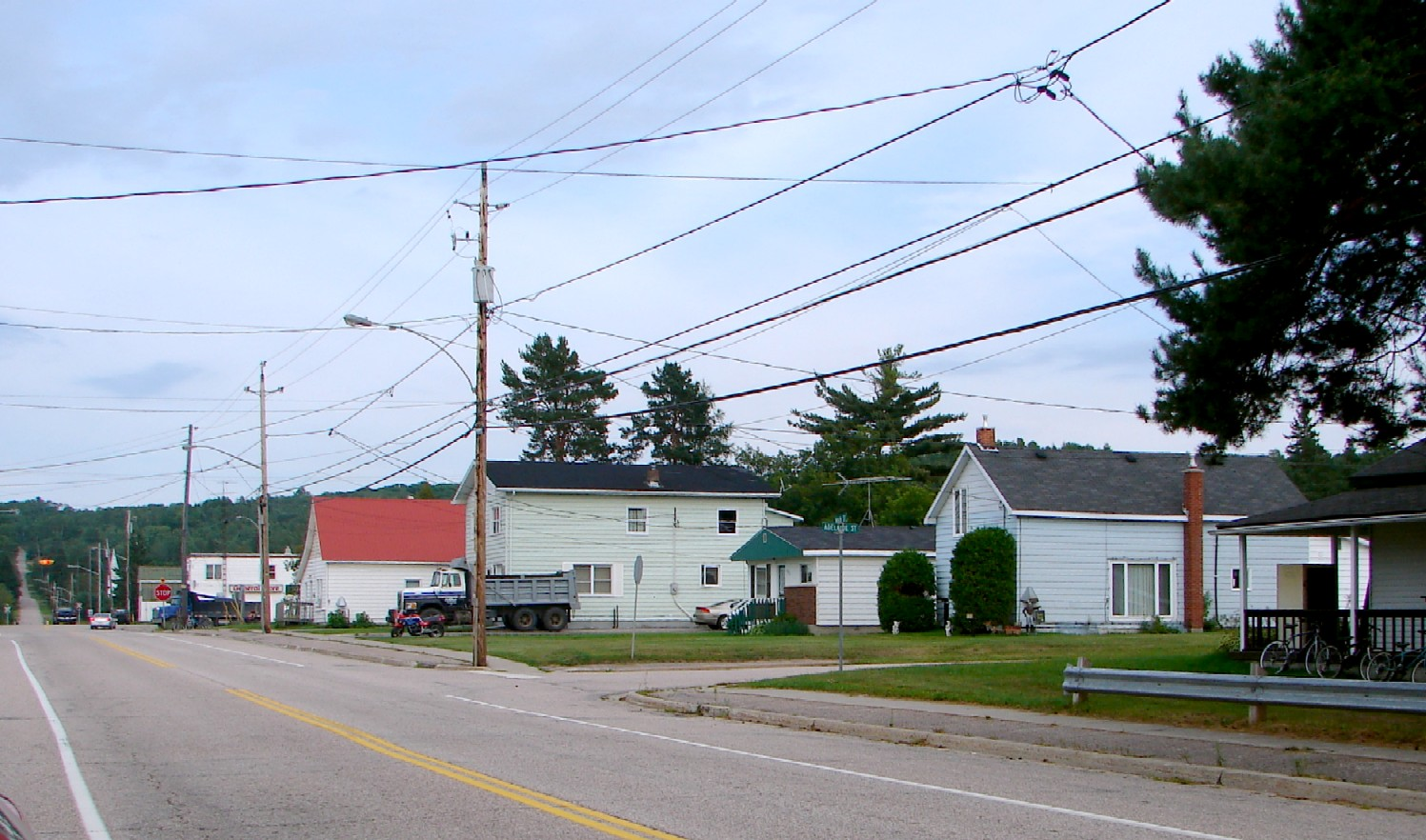
- Hwy 522/Main Street West in Trout Creek

- Location of Trout Creek in Ontario
- Coordinates: 45°59′09″N 79°21′43″W
- Country: Canada
- Province: Ontario
- District: Parry Sound District
- Municipality: Powassan
- Settled: 1868
- Town: 1913
- Elevation: 310 m (1,020 ft)
- Time zone: UTC-5 (Eastern Time Zone)
  - Summer (DST): UTC-4 (Eastern Time Zone)
- Canadian Postal Code: P0H 2L0
- Area code: Area code 705

Trout Creek is a community and unincorporated area in the municipality of Powassan, Parry Sound District in Northern Ontario, Canada. It is in geographic South Himsworth Township; is located on Ontario Highway 11, 12 kilometres (7 mi) south of the town centre of Powassan; and is part of the Almaguin Highlands.

It was at "the Chalet" in Trout Creek that the first complete set of rules for the Canadian sport of ringette developed by Mirl Arthur "Red" McCarthy were presented to the Society of Directors of Municipal Recreation of Ontario (SDMRO) by the Northern Ontario Recreation Directors Association (NORDA) on May 31, 1965.

== Etymology ==
Situated on a tributary of the South River, in Parry Sound District, 37 kilometres (23 mi) south of North Bay, this town (1913) was first known as Little Bend of the South River and Powassan as the Big Bend. It was called Melbourne after the pioneer settlers arrived in 1868, possibly for Melbourne, Australia, itself named in 1835 for Lord Melbourne (1779–1848), the British prime minister in 1834–41. However, its post office was called Barkerton in 1887. Three years later it was renamed Trout Creek.

== Demographics ==
In the 2021 Census of Population conducted by Statistics Canada, Trout Creek had a population of 458 living in 207 of its 216 total private dwellings, a change of −14.9% from its 2016 population of 538. With a land area of 3.13 km^{2} (1.21 sq mi), it had a population density of 146.3/km^{2} (379.0/sq mi) in 2021.

== Transportation ==
The Canadian National Railway transcontinental main line was the first transportation link that was constructed in the area during the late 19th century. In the early 20th century, the Ferguson Road, later becoming Ontario Highway 11 was constructed on a roughly parallel course to the rail line. Ontario Highway 11 was rerouted around the community in 2002 following its expansion to a four-lane divided highway, with Ontario Highway 522 assuming its former alignment south out of the community reaching its terminus at McFadden Line and Interchange 301, and the former northern alignment became Ontario Highway 522B reaching its terminus at Hemlock Road and Interchange 306.

== Notable residents ==
Gerry Odrowski

James Corkery
