= Restoule Lake =

Lake in Ontario, Canada

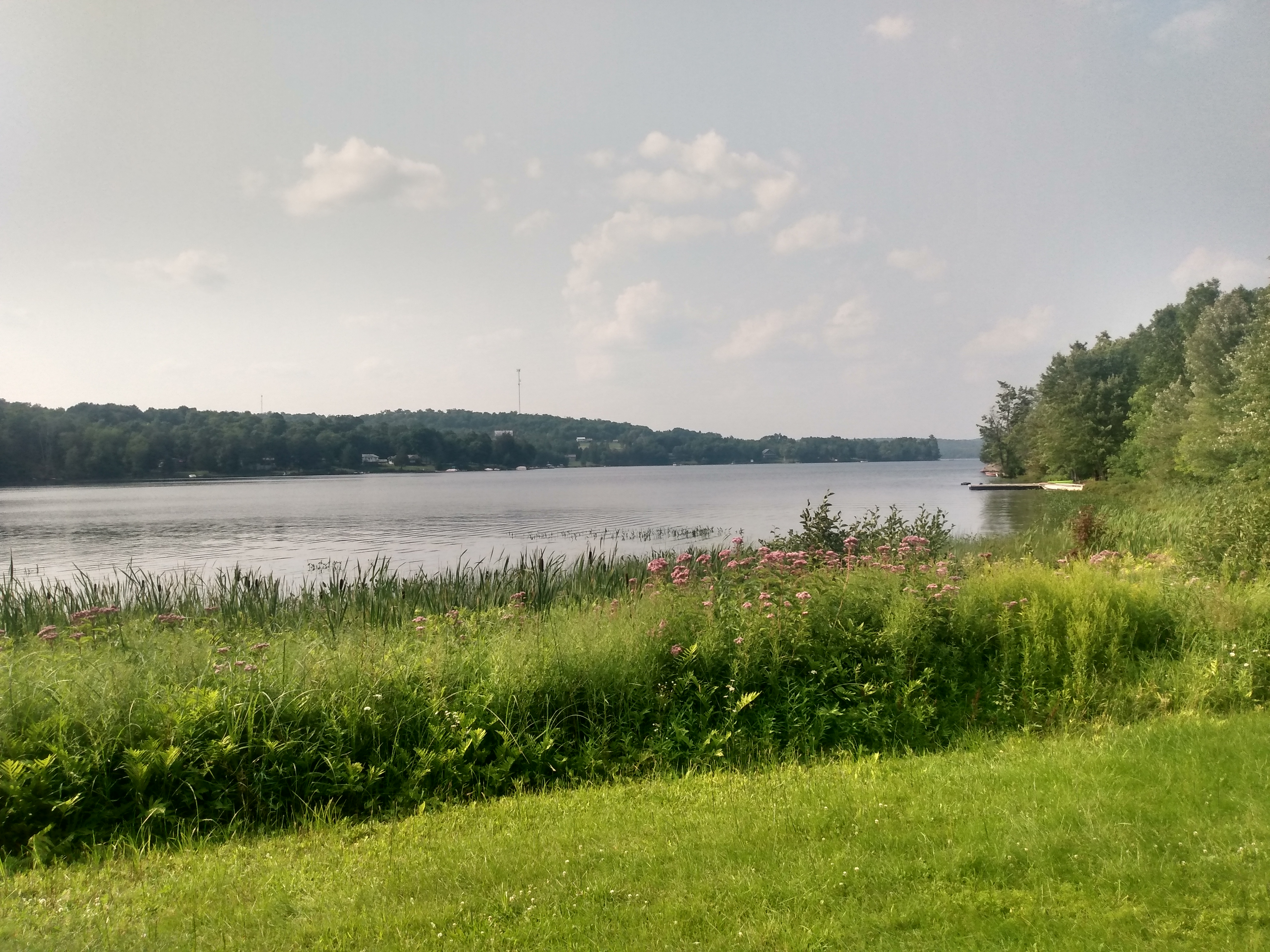
- Mill Bay

- Location within Ontario
- Location: Ontario
- Coordinates: 46°3′N 79°46′W
- Primary inflows: Restoule River
- Primary outflows: Restoule River
- Basin countries: Canada
- Max. length: 9 miles (14 km)
- Surface area: 3,057 acres (12.37 km^{2})
- Max. depth: 30 m (98 ft)
- Surface elevation: 211 m (692 ft)
- Islands: 7 (Porter Island, Horseshoe Island, Miller's Island, Brownell Island, Maw's Island, Green Island, Dry Island)

Restoule Lake is a lake found in the Almaguin Highlands region of the Parry Sound District in the province of Ontario, Canada. It is one of the larger lakes in the area and contains many islands. It was discovered by fur traders. The lake is named after native chief Joseph Restoule. Restoule Provincial Park is located on the north shore of the lake.

== See also ==
- List of lakes in Ontario
