= Pickerel River (Ontario) =

River in Ontario, Canada

- Location of mouth

Location
- Country: Canada
- Province: Ontario

Physical characteristics
- Mouth
  - coordinates: 45°55′40″N 80°46′33″W

Basin features
- River system: French River

The Pickerel River is a river in the Canadian province of Ontario. Essentially a secondary arm of the larger French River system, the river extends from its headwaters in the Loring and Restoule area of the Almaguin Highlands in the northern part of Parry Sound District to Georgian Bay. Smaller channels near Wanikewin and Hartley Bay also connect the river directly to the main watercourse of the French River.

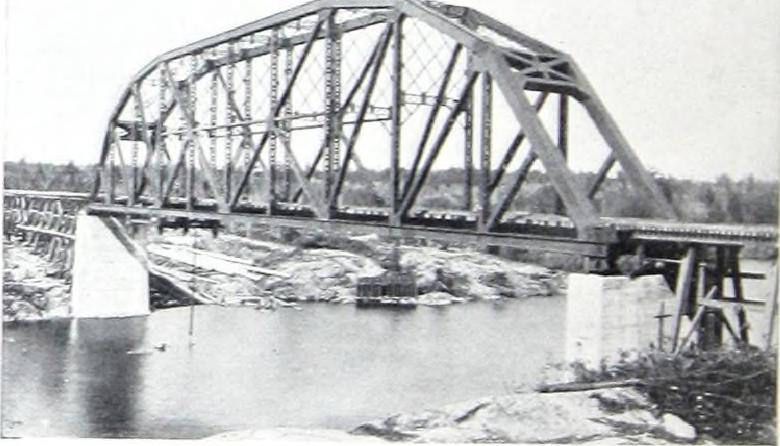
The Canadian Northern Railway bridge in 1907.

The river is crossed by the Canadian National Railway's Bala Subdivision, the Canadian Pacific Railway's Parry Sound Subdivision, and the Trans-Canada Highway (as Ontario Highway 69). The Canadian National Railway bridge dates to c. 1906 and was originally built for the Canadian Northern Railway, Canadian National's predecessor.
