= Loring, Port Loring and District =

Local services board in Ontario, Canada

Coordinates: 45°55′N 79°59′W

Loring, Port Loring and District is a local services board in the Canadian province of Ontario, located in Parry Sound District, and by extension, the Almaguin Highlands region.

The board administers services in the geographic townships of Blair, East Mills and Wilson and parts of the geographic townships of Hardy, McConkey and Pringle, including the communities of Arnstein, Bear Valley, Ess Narrows Landing, Fleming's Landing, Golden Valley, Loring, Port Loring and Spring Creek. The ghost town of Lost Channel is also located within the board's jurisdictional area.

Loring was named in 1884 by Member of Parliament William Edward O'Brien after his wife's maiden name, and the nearby community of Port Loring was named in 1922 for its position on the shore of Wauquimakog Lake in the Pickerel River system. Historically, Port Loring was an important logging centre. Currently, the community is known for its tourism industry, which is focused primarily on camping, deer hunting, fishing and snowmobiling. Along with the nearby community of Restoule, the area promotes itself as the Loring-Restoule tourist area.

Loring is noted for producing some of the best Maple Syrup in the world according to the Royal Agricultural Winter Fair in Toronto. In 2019 Sarah and Mike Clapperton of "Clapperton Maple Syrup" took top honours in the Canada Grade A, Amber/Rich Taste Category. "Clapperton Maple Syrup" also won the John David Easton World Championship Cup for producing the very best syrup that year.

"Two Wet Dogs Maple Syrup" owned by Ann and Hunter Wilson, have been consistent winners of the Royal Agricultural Winter Fair Awards winning 1st place for their Grade "A" Dark Maple Syrup in 2020 and 2022, the Dominion & Grimm Reserve Grand Champion Trophy also in 2022, Grade "A" Amber Maple Syrup in 2023 and two World Champion Maple Syrup awards back to back in 2024 and 2025.

== Etymology ==
Arnstein was named in 1887 by postmaster William Brunne after a village in Bavaria, Germany, 20 km north of Würzburg.

Blair Township was named in 1878 after Adam Johnston Fergusson Blair (1815–67), a son of Adam Fergusson, the founder of Fergus. He has assumed the name Blair on coming into the possession of an estate in Scotland. Blair was the member for Waterloo in the Legislative Assembly of the Province of Canada, 1849–54, and for Wellington-South, 1854–57, and was member for Brock on the Legislative Council, 1860–67. Appointed to the Senate in 1867, he was president of the Privy Council in John A. Macdonald's first post-Confederation cabinet.

East Mills Township was named in 1876 for David Mills (1831–1903), minister of the interior in the government of Alexander Mackenzie, 1876–78, and minister of justice in government of Sir Wilfrid Laurier, 1897-1902. He represented the province of Ontario in 1884 before the British Privy Council on the northwestern boundary dispute with Manitoba. Note: In 1967, Mills along with Burpee (now part of the Municipality of Whitestone) were renamed East Mills and East Burpee to distinguish them from essentially (west) Mills and (west) Burpee townships in Manitoulin District, which now constitute the Township of Burpee and Mills.

Golden Valley was named in 1878 by pioneer settler and Huron County native Barnard Fagan. He called to friends from a hilltop that he was seeing the 'golden valley' as he observed it below, ablaze with the golden colours of autumn. The post office was opened ten years later.

Hardy Township was named in 1887 for Arthur Sturgis Hardy (1837–1901), provincial secretary, 1877–89, commissioner of crown lands, 1889–96, and Premier of Ontario, 1896-9.

Loring was first known in the mid-1870s as McConkey Corners after McConkey Township. It was renamed in 1884 by William Edward O'Brien (1831–1914), Conservative member for Muskoka in the House of Commons, 1882–96, for his wife, Elizabeth (Loring) Harris, whom he had married in 1864. She was the daughter of Colonel Robert Roberts Loring (1789-1848), a descendant of United Empire Loyalist Joshua Loring. She was the widow of J.F. Harris of London, Ont. Port Loring was named so in 1922.

McConkey Township was named in 1878 for Thomas David McConkey (1815–90), Liberal member for Simcoe North in the Legislative Assembly of the Province of Canada, 1863-7, and in the House of Commons, 1867–72, after which he was appointed sheriff of Simcoe County.

Wilson Township was named in 1877 for Sir Adam Wilson (1814–91), a Reform politician who became chief justice of the Court of Common Pleas, 1878–84, and of the Court of Queen's Bench, 1884-7.

== Images ==
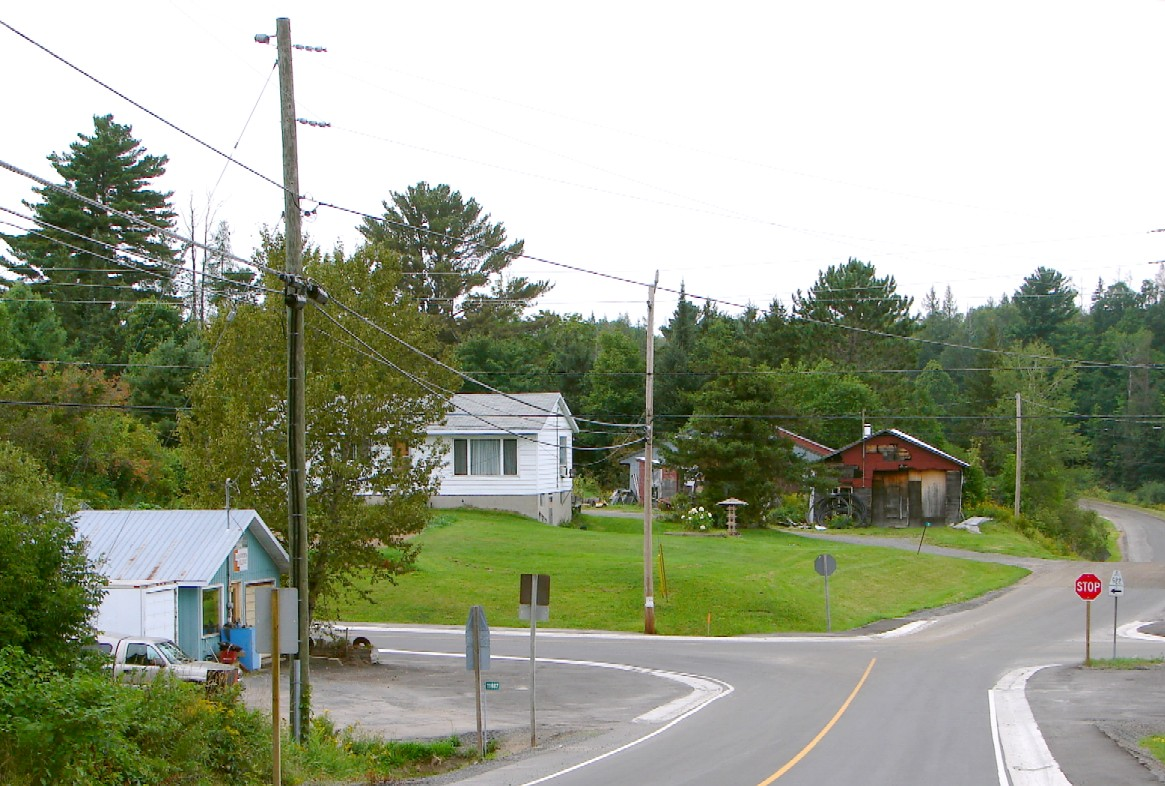
Loring

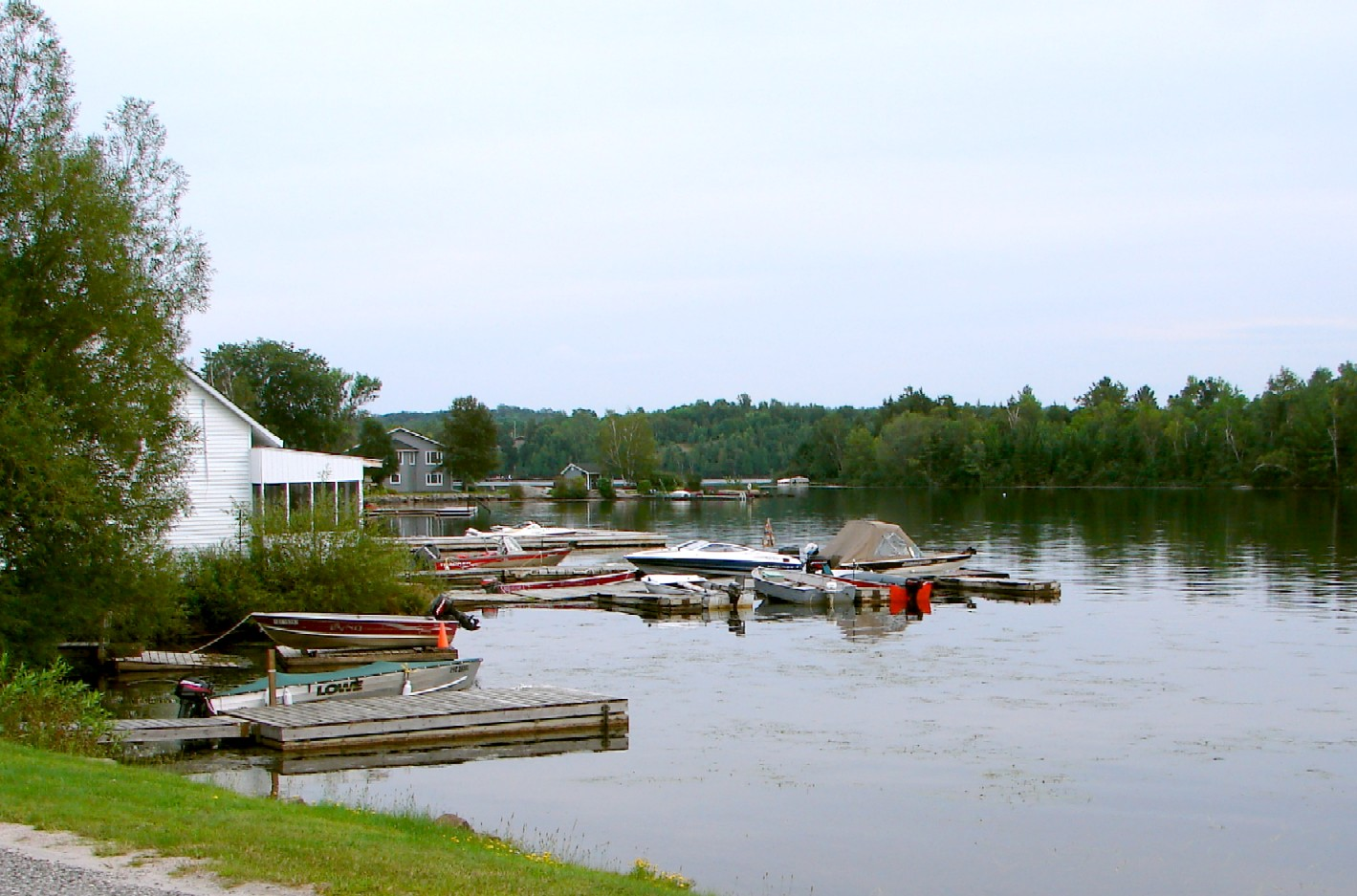
Port Loring

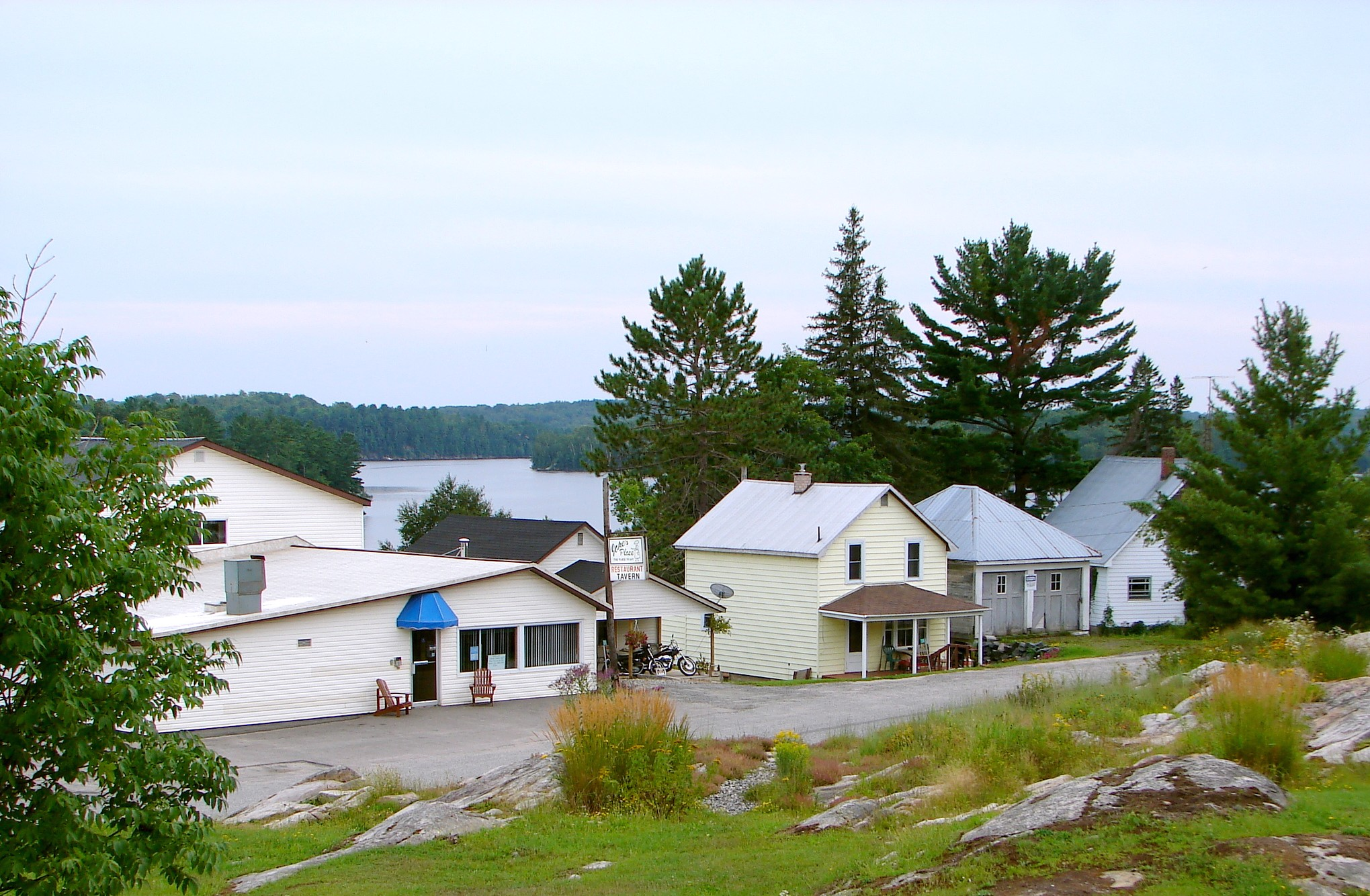
Port Loring

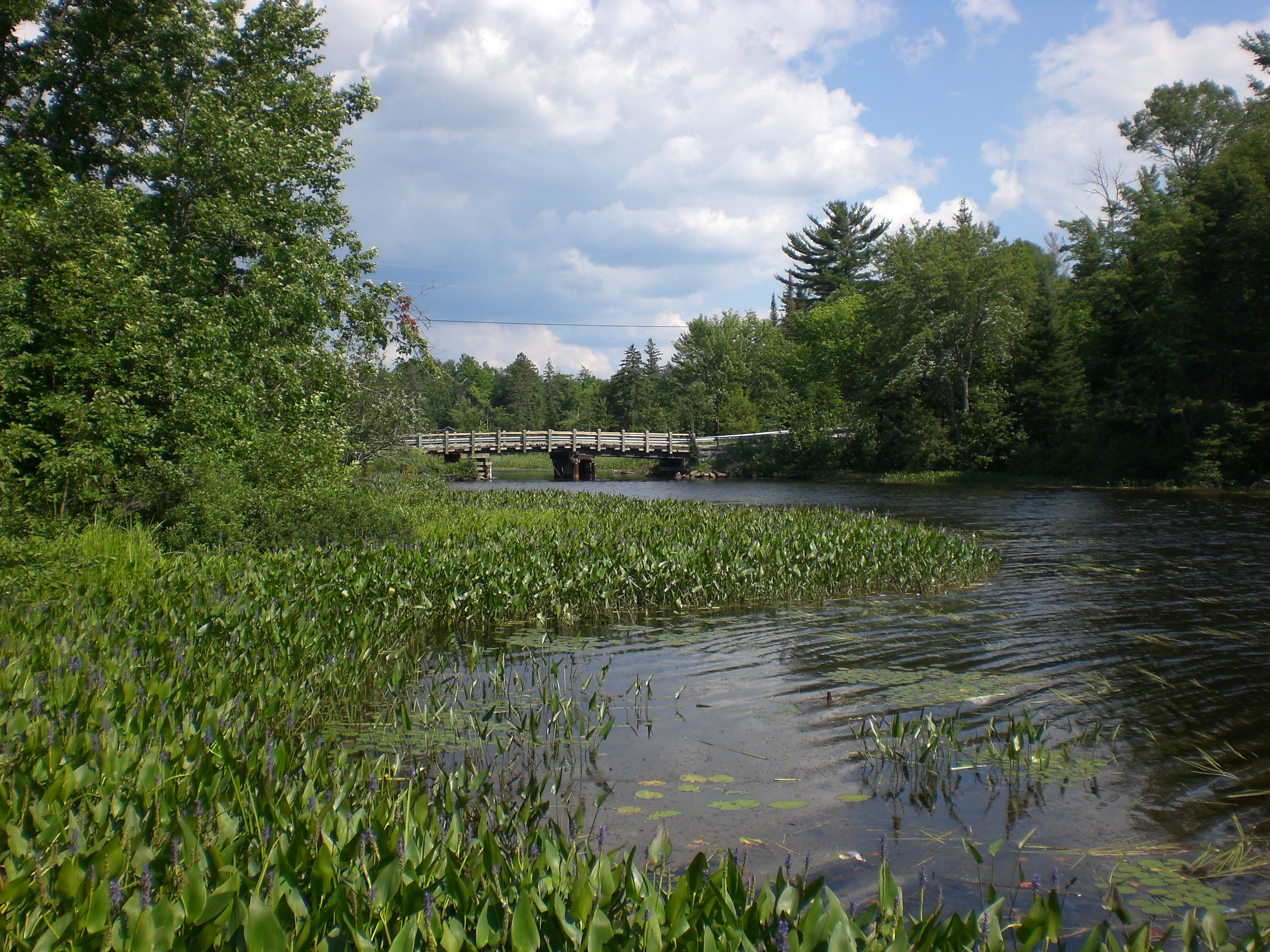
Port Loring Bridge

== See also ==
- List of townships in Ontario
