= Powassan =

Municipality in Ontario, Canada

- Municipality (single-tier)
- Municipality of Powassan
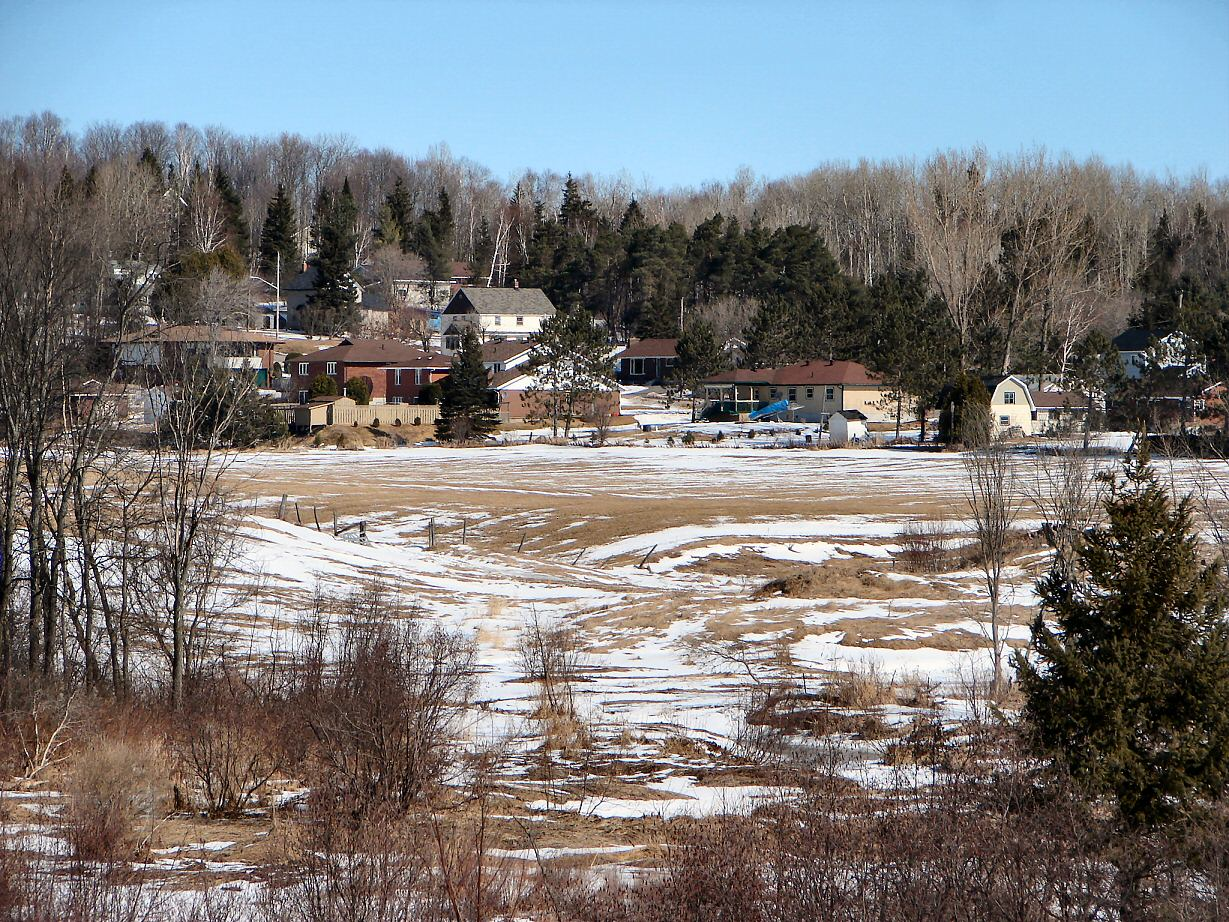

- Location within Southern Ontario
- Coordinates: 46°04′57″N 79°21′43″W
- Country: Canada
- Province: Ontario
- District: Parry Sound District
- Established: 1904 (original boundaries); 2001 (current boundaries)

Government
  - Type: Town
  - Mayor: Beckie Metcalf
  - Governing Body: Municipality of Powassan Council
  - MP: Pauline Rochefort (L)
  - MPP: Vic Fedeli (PC)

Area
  - Total: 223.26 km^{2} (86.20 sq mi)

Population (2021)
  - Total: 3,346
  - Density: 15/km^{2} (39/sq mi)
- Time zone: UTC-5 (EST)
  - Summer (DST): UTC-4 (EDT)
- Postal code span: P0H
- Area code: 705
- Website: www.powassan.net

Powassan (/pəˈwɑːsən/) is a municipality in the Canadian province of Ontario, located near North Bay.

The municipality includes the population centres of Powassan and Trout Creek, both along Highway 11.

== History ==
Taken from a First Nations name that means "bend", Powassan's original settlement was at the bend of the South River. The location today is known as the Bingham Chute, and is where the present hydro plant is. The village of Powassan began in about 1880 with the construction of a sawmill and a grist mill. Mill employees built their houses in that section of the village.

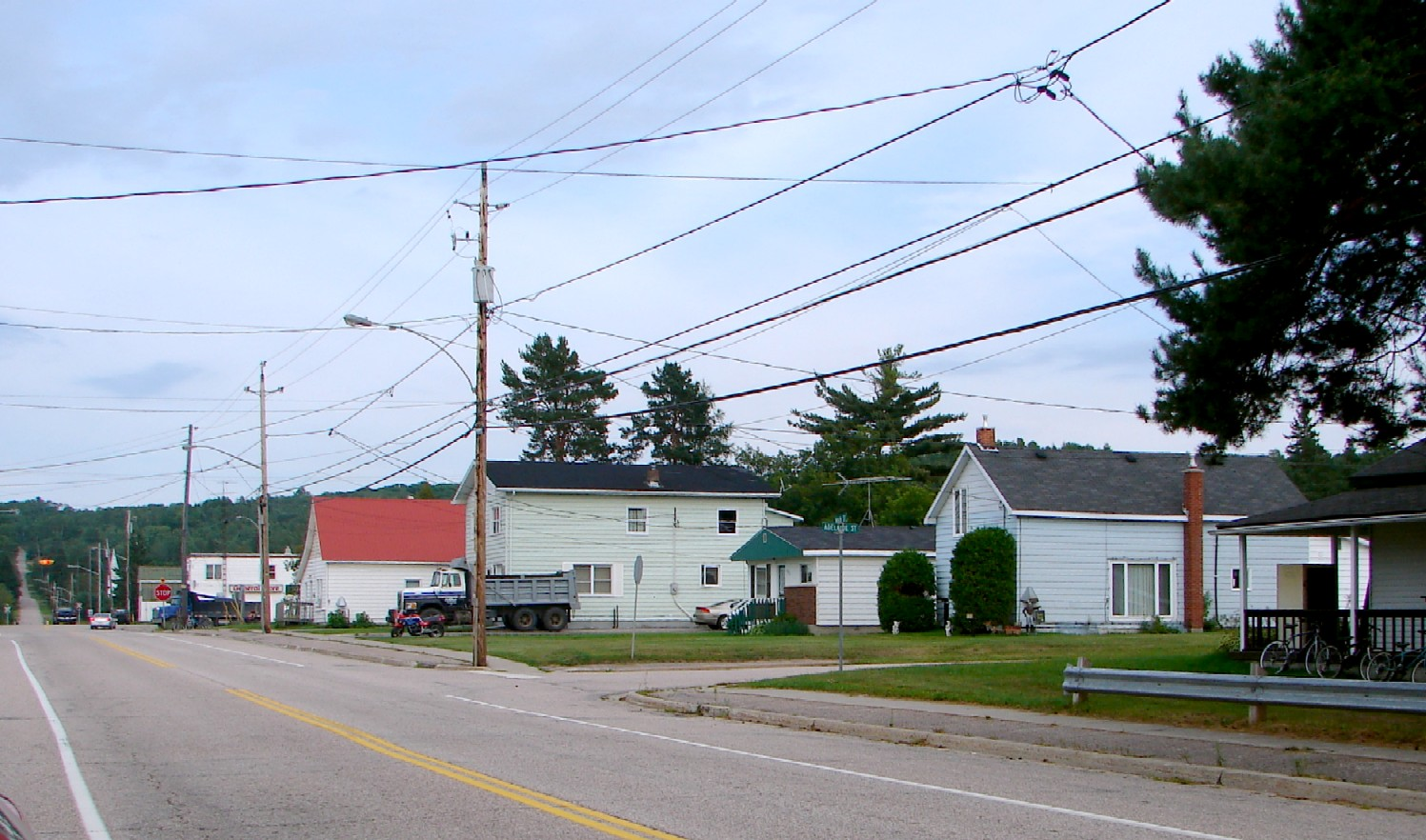
Trout Creek

A construction camp for the Northern and Pacific Junction Railway was established at Powassan in 1885. This section of track completed in 1886, was taken over by the Grand Trunk Railway in 1888 and absorbed by Canadian National Railways in 1923.

In 1886, the operation of the Northern and Pacific Junction Railway between Gravenhurst and Nipissing Junction saw the development of a second settlement near the railroad. Christopher Redfield and William Faulkner Clark were granted two lots by the Crown, lots 15 and 16, respectively, in the 12th concession of the Township of Himsworth. The 15th sideroad of the Township of Himsworth was the road allowance reserve between the two lots, which is the present-day Main Street, Powassan's main thoroughfare. Armstrong divided lot 15 into sections that were 1/5 acre (810 m^{2}) in size; Clark divided lots into 1/4 acre (1,000 m^{2}) each. Clark's plans are registered as numbers 43 and 57.

On November 30, 1904, a Royal Proclamation was issued that declared that Powassan was a separate and new municipality. In the same proclamation, the citizens were constituted a body corporate under the name of the Corporation of the Town of Powassan. In 1906, the present town hall was built.

Powassan virus, a tick-borne disease, is named after the town of Powassan, where it was identified in a 5-year-old boy who died from encephalitis in 1958.

The current Municipality of Powassan came into being on January 1, 2001 as a result of the amalgamation of the Town of Powassan, Town of Trout Creek and the Township of South Himsworth. The two main communities in the town are Powassan and Trout Creek.

== Geography ==
Powassan is located in the Almaguin Highlands region of Parry Sound District, at its easternmost boundary with the Nipissing District.

=== Climate ===
Climate data for Powassan (1981−2010)
Month	Jan	Feb	Mar	Apr	May	Jun	Jul	Aug	Sep	Oct	Nov	Dec	Year
Record high °C (°F)	13.0 (55.4)	14.5 (58.1)	20.6 (69.1)	31.0 (87.8)	32.2 (90.0)	34.0 (93.2)	36.0 (96.8)	34.5 (94.1)	31.5 (88.7)	27.5 (81.5)	18.9 (66.0)	17.5 (63.5)	36.0 (96.8)
Mean daily maximum °C (°F)	−6.9 (19.6)	−4.3 (24.3)	1.3 (34.3)	9.8 (49.6)	17.6 (63.7)	22.5 (72.5)	24.9 (76.8)	23.4 (74.1)	18.4 (65.1)	11.0 (51.8)	3.5 (38.3)	−3.1 (26.4)	9.8 (49.6)
Daily mean °C (°F)	−12.3 (9.9)	−10 (14)	−4.4 (24.1)	4.2 (39.6)	11.3 (52.3)	16.2 (61.2)	18.7 (65.7)	17.5 (63.5)	13.1 (55.6)	6.6 (43.9)	−0.2 (31.6)	−7.5 (18.5)	4.4 (39.9)
Mean daily minimum °C (°F)	−17.7 (0.1)	−15.7 (3.7)	−10.0 (14.0)	−1.5 (29.3)	4.9 (40.8)	9.9 (49.8)	12.5 (54.5)	11.5 (52.7)	7.8 (46.0)	2.2 (36.0)	−3.9 (25.0)	−11.9 (10.6)	−1.0 (30.2)
Record low °C (°F)	−43.5 (−46.3)	−42.0 (−43.6)	−36.0 (−32.8)	−20.0 (−4.0)	−5.6 (21.9)	−2.0 (28.4)	1.5 (34.7)	−0.5 (31.1)	−6.0 (21.2)	−9.5 (14.9)	−29.0 (−20.2)	−40.5 (−40.9)	−43.5 (−46.3)
Average precipitation mm (inches)	63.1 (2.48)	48.7 (1.92)	60.0 (2.36)	63.8 (2.51)	86.6 (3.41)	81.2 (3.20)	97.7 (3.85)	93.1 (3.67)	105.5 (4.15)	96.9 (3.81)	89.1 (3.51)	64.1 (2.52)	949.7 (37.39)
Average rainfall mm (inches)	14.8 (0.58)	9.3 (0.37)	30.2 (1.19)	49.1 (1.93)	83.8 (3.30)	81.2 (3.20)	97.7 (3.85)	83.1 (3.27)	105.4 (4.15)	91.0 (3.58)	59.0 (2.32)	21.3 (0.84)	735.9 (28.97)
Average snowfall cm (inches)	48.3 (19.0)	39.3 (15.5)	29.8 (11.7)	14.7 (5.8)	2.8 (1.1)	0.0 (0.0)	0.0 (0.0)	0.0 (0.0)	0.1 (0.0)	5.9 (2.3)	30.1 (11.9)	42.8 (16.9)	213.7 (84.1)
Average precipitation days (≥ 0.2 mm)	15.1	12.1	12.0	13.0	14.0	14.0	13.0	12.2	14.6	15.8	17.0	15.9	168.7
Average rainy days (≥ 0.2 mm)	3.0	2.5	5.2	10.4	13.8	14.0	13.0	12.2	14.6	14.8	10.7	4.3	118.6
Average snowy days (≥ 0.2 cm)	13.4	10.4	8.3	4.1	0.50	0.0	0.0	0.0	0.08	1.9	8.4	13.3	60.4
Source: Environment Canada

== Demographics ==
In the 2021 Census of Population conducted by Statistics Canada, Powassan had a population of 3,346 living in 1,317 of its 1,381 total private dwellings, a change of −3.2% from its 2016 population of 3,455. With a land area of 223.26 km^{2} (86.20 sq mi), it had a population density of 15.0/km^{2} (38.8/sq mi) in 2021.

Historical census populations – Powassan

Year	Pop.	±%
1911	644	—
1921	614	−4.7%
1931	650	+5.9%
1941	775	+19.2%
1951	832	+7.4%
1961	1,064	+27.9%

Year	Pop.	±%
1971	1,163	+9.3%
1981	1,015	−12.7%
1986	1,112	+9.6%
1991	1,150	+3.4%
1996	1,125	−2.2%
2001	3,252	+189.1%

Year	Pop.	±%
2006	3,309	+1.8%
2011	3,378	+2.1%
2016	3,455	+2.3%
2021	3,346	−3.2%

Population counts are not adjusted for boundary changes and mergers.
Source: Statistics Canada, 2021, 2016, 2011, 2006, 2001 and 1996, 1991 and 1986

== See also ==
- List of townships in Ontario
