= Snowshoe Lake =

Snowshoe Lake may refer to:

== Canada ==
- Snowshoe Lake (Bark Lake, Ontario)
- Snowshoe Lake (Cripple Creek, Ontario)
- Snowshoe Lake (Frontenac County)
- Snowshoe Lake (Kenora District)
- Snowshoe Lake (Kimikong River, Ontario)
- Snowshoe Lake (West Harry Lake, Ontario), in Algonquin Park
- Snowshoe Lake (Magnetawan River, Ontario)
- Snowshoe Lake (Temagami), Nipissing District, Ontario
- Snowshoe Lake (Thunder Bay District)

== United States ==
- Snowshoe Lake (Montana)
