= Perry Lake =

Perry Lake or Perry Lakes may refer to several lakes:

== Australia ==
- Perry Lakes Reserve, a nature reserve in Australia

== Canada ==
- Perry Lake (Nova Scotia), a lake in Nova Scotia
- Perry Lake (Kearney, Ontario), a lake in Ontario

== United States ==
- Perry Lake (Kansas), a reservoir in Kansas
- Perry Lake Township, Minnesota
- Perry Lake (Minnesota), a lake in Minnesota
