= Tonawanda Creek (Ontario) =

- Location of the mouth of Tonawanda Creek in Ontario

Location
- Country: Canada
- Province: Ontario
- Region: Central Ontario
- Districts: Muskoka; Parry Sound

Physical characteristics
- Source: Unnamed lake
  - location: Kearney, Parry Sound District
  - coordinates: 45°35′45″N 79°06′23″W
  - elevation: 422 m (1,385 ft)
- Mouth: Big East River
  - location: Lake of Bays, District Municipality of Muskoka
  - coordinates: 45°28′07″N 79°03′58″W
  - elevation: 337 m (1,106 ft)

Basin features
- River system: Great Lakes Basin
- Tributaries
  - right: Little Tonawanda Creek

Tonawanda Creek is a creek in Central Ontario, Canada. It is part of the Great Lakes Basin and is a right tributary of the Big East River.

== Course ==
The creek rises at an unnamed intermittent lake near the community of Ravensworth in the municipality of Kearney in Parry Sound District. It then flows southwest, then southeast, passes over the Banning Dam, takes in the right tributary Little Tonawanda Creek, and reaches its mouth at the Big East River in the township of Lake of Bays, Muskoka District Municipality. The Big East River flows via the North Branch Muskoka River, then the Moon River and Musquash River to Lake Huron.

== Tributary ==
- Little Tonawanda Creek (right)

== See also ==
- List of rivers of Ontario
