= Roderick Lake (Muskoka District) =

- Location in Southern Ontario
- Location: District Municipality of Muskoka, Ontario
- Coordinates: 45°04′40″N 79°43′02″W
- Type: lake
- Part of: Great Lakes Basin
- Basin countries: Canada
- Max. length: 1.8 km (1.1 mi)
- Max. width: 1.1 km (0.68 mi)
- Surface elevation: 299 m (981 ft)

Roderick Lake is a lake in the municipalities of Georgian Bay and Muskoka Lakes, District Municipality of Muskoka in Central Ontario, Canada. It is in the Great Lakes Basin, and with the exception of the northwest end, is mostly in the municipality of Muskoka Lakes.

The primary inflow is Haggart Creek at the east; there are several unnamed, secondary inflows. The primary outflow is also Haggart Creek, leaving at the southeast. Haggart Creek flows via the Moon River to Georgian Bay on Lake Huron.

The Canadian Pacific Railway main line runs along the northeast shore of the lake; the railway point of Duffy is on the line on the shore of the lake.

== See also ==
- List of lakes in Ontario
