= Go Home =

Go Home may refer to:

- "Go Home" vans

== Entertainment ==
- "Go Home" (Sugar episode), 2024
- Go Home (film), 2015 film
- Go Home (album), 1970 album by the Art Ensemble of Chicago
- "Go Home" (song), 1985 song by Stevie Wonder
- Go Home Productions, Mark Vidler, English producer/remixer/DJ
- Go home (professional wrestling), a planned ending to a match

== Places ==
- Go Home Lake, lake in west central Ontario, Canada
- Go Home River, river in west central Ontario that flows west from Go Home Lake
- Go Home, Ontario, community in the Township of Georgian Bay, Ontario

== See also ==
- Going Home (disambiguation)
- Go back to where you came from
