= Haggart Lake (Muskoka District) =

- Location in Southern Ontario
- Location: District Municipality of Muskoka, Ontario
- Coordinates: 45°06′30″N 79°44′52″W
- Type: lake
- Part of: Great Lakes Basin
- Primary outflows: Haggart Creek
- Basin countries: Canada
- Max. length: 1,050 m (3,440 ft)
- Max. width: 550 m (1,800 ft)
- Surface elevation: 234 m (768 ft)

Haggart Lake is a lake in the municipalities of Georgian Bay and Muskoka Lakes, District Municipality of Muskoka in Central Ontario, Canada. It is in the Great Lakes Basin and is the source of Haggart Creek.

The east end of the lake is in the municipality of Muskoka Lakes, and the rest of the lake is in the municipality of Georgian Bay. There are three unnamed inflows at the west, northwest and north. The primary outflow is Haggart Creek, leaving at the east. Haggart Creek flows via the Moon River to Georgian Bay on Lake Huron.

The Canadian Pacific Railway main line runs along the eastern shore of the lake.

== See also ==
- List of lakes in Ontario
