= Snowshoe Lake (Cripple Creek, Ontario) =

Lake in Nipissing District, Ontario, Canada

- Location within Ontario
- Location: Kearney, Parry Sound District, Ontario
- Coordinates: 45°35′19″N 79°02′10″W
- Primary inflows: Unnamed creek from Ink Lake
- Primary outflows: Unnamed creek to Cripple Lake
- Basin countries: Canada
- Max. length: 1.5 km (0.93 mi)
- Max. width: 0.5 km (0.31 mi)
- Surface elevation: 424 m (1,391 ft)

Snowshoe Lake is a lake in the Lake Huron drainage basin in Kearney, Almaguin Highlands, Parry Sound, Ontario, Canada. The lake is 6 kilometres (3.7 mi) east of the community of Ravenscroft, just south of the access road to Rain Lake in Algonquin Provincial Park, and 5.5 kilometres (3.4 mi) west of the park boundary. It is about 1.5 kilometres (0.9 mi) long and 0.5 kilometres (0.3 mi) wide, and lies at an elevation of 424 metres (1,391 ft). The primary inflow is an unnamed creek from Ink Lake, and the primary outflow is an unnamed creek to Cripple Lake, which flows via Cripple Creek, the Big East River, the Muskoka River and the Moon and Musquash rivers into Lake Huron.

A second Snowshoe Lake in the Big East River system, Snowshoe Lake (West Harry Lake, Ontario), lies 18.5 kilometres (11.5 mi) southeast.

== See also ==
- List of lakes in Ontario
