= Big East River =

River in Canada

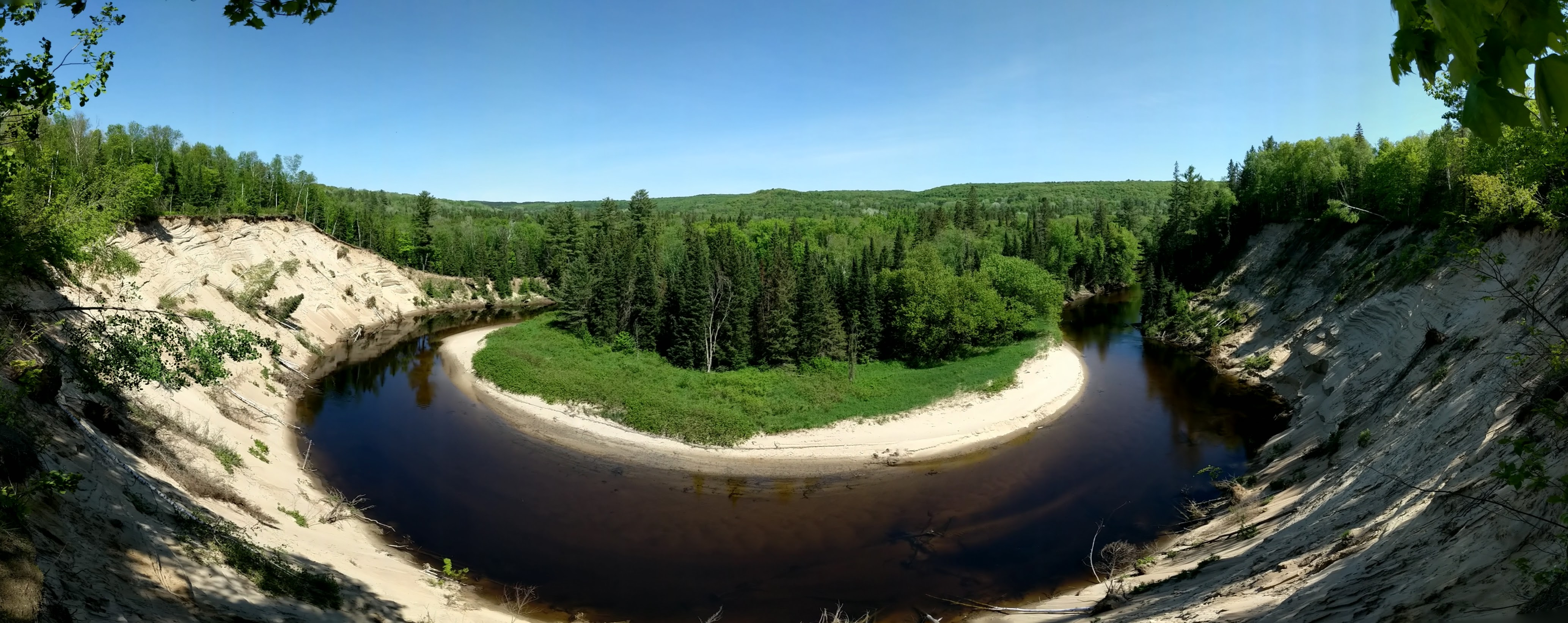

- Location of the mouth of the Big East River in Ontario

Location
- Country: Canada
- Province: Ontario
- Region: Northeastern Ontario
- Districts: Muskoka; Nipissing

Physical characteristics
- Source: East End Lake
  - location: Hunter Township, Nipissing District
  - coordinates: 45°35′28″N 78°48′49″W
  - elevation: 506 m (1,660 ft)
- Mouth: Lake Vernon, North Branch Muskoka River
  - location: Huntsville, Muskoka District Municipality
  - coordinates: 45°20′04″N 79°16′29″W
  - elevation: 283 m (928 ft)

Basin features
- River system: Great Lakes Basin
- Tributaries
  - right: Little East River, Tonawanda Creek

The Big East River is a river in Muskoka District and Nipissing District in Northeastern Ontario, Canada. The river is in the Great Lakes Basin, is a left tributary of the Muskoka River, and flows from Algonquin Provincial Park to Huntsville.

The Big East River is an established canoe route. Its upper part is difficult to paddle, with low water levels in the summer.

== Geography ==
The Big East River begins at East End Lake in Algonquin Provincial Park in geographic Hunter Township, Nipissing District. It loops east and south to Red Lake in geographic Peck Township, turns southwest to West Harry Lake, then leaves the lake southwest over West Harry Lake Dam, through the Big Cedar Chutes, and enters geographic Finlayson Township.

The river passes from Algonquin Provincial Park into Big East River Provincial Park, through Finlayson Lake and over the former Finlayson Lake Dam (which was removed to allow the river to return to its natural riverine characteristics) and through the Finlayson Rapids, and enters Muskoka District at geographic Sinclair Township in the incorporated township of Lake of Bays. It continues southwest through the McBrien Rapids to Distress Lake, where it takes in the right tributary Tonawanda Creek, over an overflow weir (which replaced the former Distress Dam). From here the river widens, slows down, and meanders, with some shallow swifts.

The river leaves Big East River Provincial Park, enters geographic Chaffey Township in the town of Huntsville, passes the Dyer Memorial on the right bank near the settlement of Williamsport, and enters a section of oxbows and loops with 35-metre-high (115 ft) sandbanks. It passes Arrowhead Provincial Park on the right bank, takes in the right tributary Little East River, then straightens and deepens before flowing under Ontario Highway 11, and reaches its mouth at Lake Vernon. Lake Vernon flows via the North Branch Muskoka River, then the Moon River and Musquash River to Lake Huron.

=== Tributaries ===
- Little East River (right)
- Beaver Creek (right)
- Rebecca Creek (left)
- Raft Creek (right)
- Tonawanda Creek (right)
- Bear Creek (right)
- Greenish Creek (right)
- Cripple Creek (right)
- Tasso Creek (left)
- Beanpod Creek (right)
- McRaney Creek (right)
- Mink Creek (left)
- Lulu Creek (right)
- Lupus Creek (left)
- Otterpaw Creek (right)

== Big East River Provincial Park ==
Big East River Provincial Park
- IUCN category II (national park)
- Interactive map of Big East River Provincial Park
- Location: Lake of Bays
- Coordinates: 45°28′05″N 79°04′58″W
- Area: 1,050 ha (4.1 sq mi)
- Designation: Waterway
- Established: 2000
- Governing body: Ontario Parks
- Website: www.ontarioparks.ca/park/bigeastriver

Big East River Provincial Park is a provincial park in Lake of Bays Township, Ontario, Canada, established on August 10, 2000, as the first of Ontario's Living Legacy's new provincial parks. As a waterway class park, it protects the waters and 200-metre wide (660 ft) strips of land along both banks of the Big East River, from the western boundary of Algonquin Park to Arrowhead Provincial Park. The river in the park has "spectacular" sandy bluffs and numerous oxbows.

Big East River Provincial Park is a non-operating park, meaning that there are no facilities or services for visitors. Low–impact recreational activities such as hiking, swimming, canoeing, kayaking, and nature–viewing are permitted and encouraged.

More than 400 vascular plant species and over 90 bird species in some 18 vegetation environments are found within the park, including over 30 regionally or provincially rare species of plants and several rare bird species.

== See also ==
- List of rivers of Ontario

== Sources ==
- Map 9 (PDF) (Map). 1 : 700,000. Official road map of Ontario. Ministry of Transportation of Ontario. January 1, 2010.
- Restructured municipalities - Ontario map #5 (Map). Restructuring Maps of Ontario. Ontario Ministry of Municipal Affairs and Housing. 2006. Archived from the original on 2020-05-11.
