= Roderick Lake =

Roderick Lake may refer to:

- Roderick Lake (Manitoba–Saskatchewan)
- Roderick Lake (Muskoka District)
