= Haggart Creek (Muskoka District) =

- Location of the mouth of the creek in Southern Ontario

Location
- Country: Canada
- Province: Ontario
- Region: Central Ontario
- District: Muskoka
- Municipalities: Muskoka Lakes; Georgian Bay

Physical characteristics
- Source: Haggart Lake
  - location: Muskoka Lakes
  - coordinates: 45°06′31″N 79°44′23″W
  - elevation: 234 m (768 ft)
- Mouth: Moon River
  - location: Georgian Bay, Ontario
  - coordinates: 45°02′59″N 79°44′29″W
  - elevation: 209 m (686 ft)

Basin features
- River system: Great Lakes Basin

Haggart Creek is a creek in the municipalities of Georgian Bay and Muskoka Lakes, District Municipality of Muskoka in Central Ontario, Canada. It is in the Great Lakes Basin and is a right tributary of the Moon River.

== Course ==
The creek begins at the east end of Haggart Lake, in geographic Medora Township in the municipality of Muskoka Lakes, and flows east under the Canadian Pacific Railway main line to Cassidy Lake, leaves that lake at the south heading south, passes again under the CP railway, and reaches the eastern end of Roderick Lake. It exits the lake at the southeast at the railway point of Duffy, flows southeast to the western side of Duffy Lakes, turns southwest, enters geographic Gibson Township in the municipality of Georgian Bay, and reaches its mouth at the Moon River. The Moon River flows to Georgian Bay on Lake Huron.
