= Snowshoe Lake (West Harry Lake, Ontario) =

Lake in Nipissing District, Ontario, Canada

- Location within Ontario
- Location: Nipissing District, Ontario
- Coordinates: 45°33′42″N 78°48′13″W
- Primary outflows: Unnamed creek to West Harry Lake
- Basin countries: Canada
- Max. length: 0.79 km (0.49 mi)
- Max. width: 0.1 km (0.062 mi)
- Surface elevation: 466 m (1,529 ft)

Snowshoe Lake is a lake in the Lake Huron drainage basin in Algonquin Provincial Park in Nipissing District, Ontario, Canada. It is about 790 metres (2,592 ft) long and 100 metres (328 ft) wide, and lies at an elevation of 466 metres (1,529 ft). The primary outflow is an unnamed creek to West Harry Lake, which flows via the Big East River, the Muskoka River and the Moon and Musquash rivers into Lake Huron.

A second Snowshoe Lake in the Big East River system, Snowshoe Lake (Cripple Creek, Ontario), is 18.5 kilometres (11.5 mi) northeast.

== See also ==
- List of lakes in Ontario
