= Royal Hotel (Honey Harbour) =

Coordinates: 44.87307°N 79.8251°W

Royal Hotel (Honey Harbour) was a large hotel that operated on Royal Island, Ontario located across the channel from Honey Harbour, Ontario and the Delawana Inn.

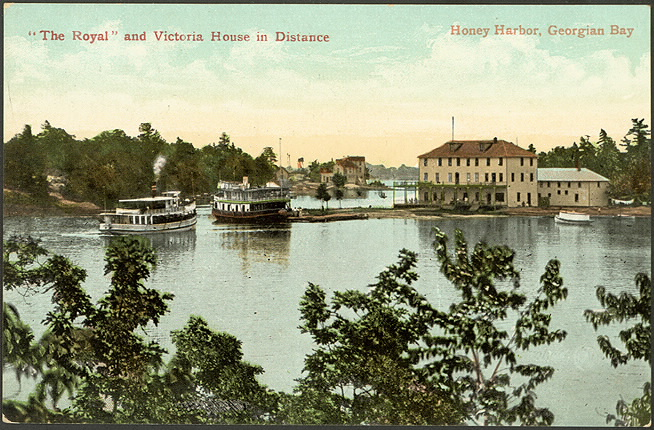

== History ==
Opened in 1903 by the Grisé brothers (Frederick), the grand white siding three storey hotel sat along the channel across from Honey Harbour of the island serviced by Steamboats like SS Midland City that were used in the Muskoka area. The hotel had a Veranda on the first and second floor, serviced by a dock along the channel side of the island.

It was closed in the 1970s and later demolished. Frederick Grisé also operated the Victoria House Hotel across from the Royal since the 1920s and later renamed Delawana Inn.

== Royal Island Cottage ==
Today the site is vacant other than a cottage found further into Royal Island.
