= Perry Lake Township, Crow Wing County, Minnesota =

Township in Minnesota, United States

Perry Lake Township
- Township
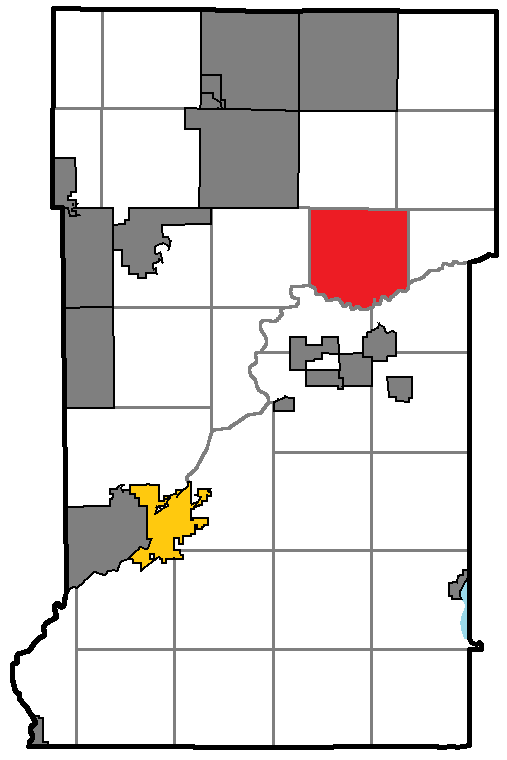
- Location of Perry Lake Township, within Crow Wing County, Minnesota
- Coordinates: 46°34′34″N 93°56′44″W
- Country: United States
- State: Minnesota
- County: Crow Wing

Area
  - Total: 32.5 sq mi (84.3 km^{2})
  - Land: 30.8 sq mi (79.9 km^{2})
  - Water: 1.7 sq mi (4.4 km^{2})
- Elevation: 1,257 ft (383 m)

Population (2020)
  - Total: 286
  - Density: 9.27/sq mi (3.58/km^{2})
- Time zone: UTC-6 (Central (CST))
  - Summer (DST): UTC-5 (CDT)
- FIPS code: 27-50542
- GNIS feature ID: 0665288

Perry Lake Township is a township located in Crow Wing County, Minnesota, United States. The population was 286 at the 2020 census. This township took its name from Perry Lake.

== Geography ==
According to the United States Census Bureau, the township has a total area of 32.6 square miles (84.3 km^{2}), of which 30.9 square miles (79.9 km^{2}) is land and 1.7 square miles (4.4 km^{2}) (5.25%) is water.

== Demographics ==
As of the census of 2000, there were 237 people, 86 households, and 68 families residing in the township. The population density was 7.7 people per square mile (3.0/km^{2}). There were 138 housing units at an average density of 1.7/km^{2} (4.5/sq mi). The racial makeup of the township was 98.73% White, 0.84% Native American, and 0.42% from two or more races. Hispanic or Latino of any race were 0.84% of the population.

There were 86 households, out of which 40.7% had children under the age of 18 living with them, 72.1% were married couples living together, 5.8% had a female householder with no husband present, and 19.8% were non-families. 12.8% of all households were made up of individuals, and 3.5% had someone living alone who was 65 years of age or older. The average household size was 2.76 and the average family size was 3.01.

In the township the population was spread out, with 28.7% under the age of 18, 4.2% from 18 to 24, 29.5% from 25 to 44, 25.3% from 45 to 64, and 12.2% who were 65 years of age or older. The median age was 38 years. For every 100 females, there were 102.6 males. For every 100 females age 18 and over, there were 106.1 males.

The median income for a household in the township was $46,563, and the median income for a family was $47,031. Males had a median income of $36,944 versus $25,625 for females. The per capita income for the township was $16,728. About 9.2% of families and 11.9% of the population were below the poverty line, including 18.5% of those under the age of 18 and 9.1% of those 65 and older.
