= Sand Lake (Kearney, Ontario) =

Lake in Parry Sound District, Ontario, Canada

- A misty sunrise in July at Sand Lake (Parry Sound District)

- Location within Ontario
- Location: Kearney, Parry Sound District, Ontario
- Coordinates: 45°37′30″N 79°10′05″W
- Primary inflows: Magnetawan River
- Primary outflows: Magnetawan River
- Catchment area: 242 km^{2} (93 sq mi)
- Basin countries: Canada
- Surface area: 572 ha (1,410 acres)
- Average depth: 22.2 m (73 ft)
- Max. depth: 59.4 m (195 ft)
- Water volume: 127,600,000 m^{3} (4.51×10^{9} cu ft)
- Shore length^{1}: 12.2 km (7.6 mi) plus 0.5 km (0.31 mi) for islands
- Surface elevation: 339 m (1,112 ft)
- Islands: Emerald Island, Blueberry Island
- Settlements: Kearney
- ^{1} Shore length is not a well-defined measure.

Sand Lake (French: lac Sand) is a lake in the town of Kearney, Almaguin Highlands, Parry Sound District, Ontario, Canada. An unincorporated community of Sand Lake, Ontario could be found just north of Sand Lake prior to the amalgamation with Kearney in 1979. Sand Lake is also host to only one camp, and much of the shore of the lake is Precambrian rock of the Canadian Shield. There are only a few occurrences of sandy beach around the lake shoreline due largely to runoff water erosion carrying sand from creeks from the surrounding elevated rocky terrain. However, a good portion of the shallow waters around the shore are sand as the name of the lake suggests.

Sand Lake is part of the Magnetawan River system. The river enters the lake at the north shore and flows out of the south end of the lake.

There are two islands in the lake. Blueberry Island is located near the northern shore of the lake, close to the mouth of the Magnetawan River. The larger Emerald Island is located in the west bay of the lake, west of Rock Point.

== Image gallery ==
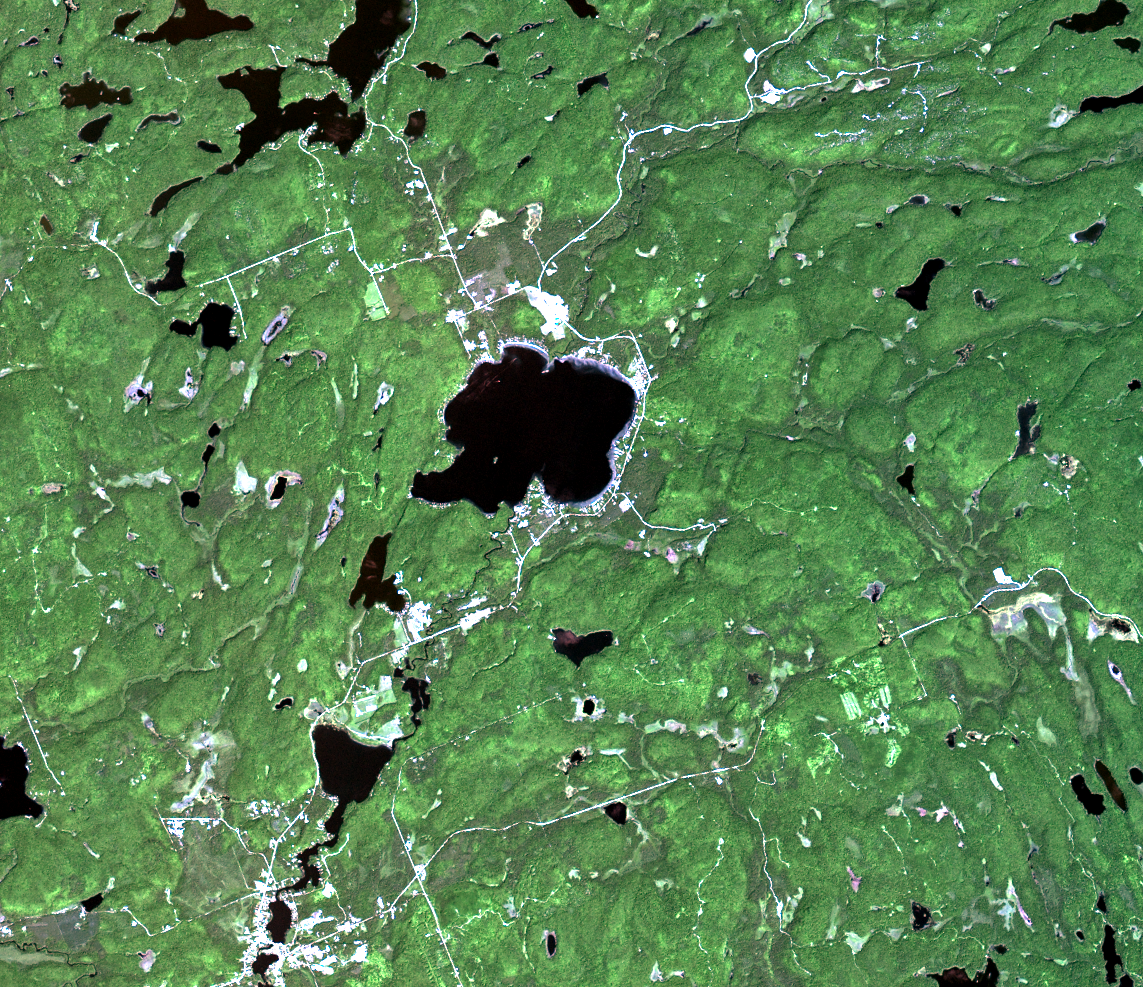
Sand Lake (centre) and surrounding area. Town site of Kearney bottom left.

== See also ==
- List of lakes in Ontario
