= Delawana Inn =

Resort in Ontario, Canada

Coordinates: 44.8707°N 79.8226°W

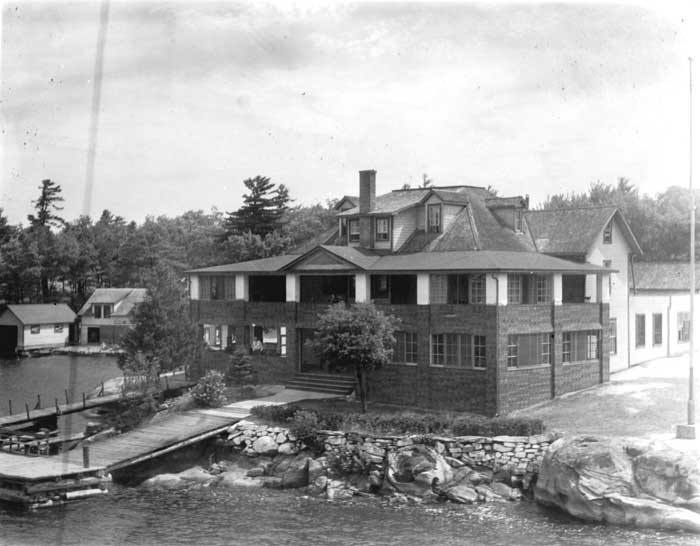
The Delawana between 1910 and 1930

The Delawana Resort is a Canadian hotel and resort in Honey Harbour in Georgian Bay, Ontario. It was formerly called Delawana Inn.

== History ==
Honey Harbour and the site of the Delawana Inn had a beach area for bathing.

Nathan Nickerson identified the site as a suitable location for a hotel. Nickerson and his wife Anne, had operated a store in Midland for twelve years, a sawmill, Nickerson Brothers' Mills in Hogg's Bay, (Victoria Harbour) and with his sons Albert and Charles, established the hotel known as the Victoria House on the present site of The Delawana Inn & Resort. When the hotel opened its doors in 1897, Nickerson was approximately seventy years old.

For fifteen cents, according to the ad in the Midland Free Press, the steamer "Odessa" would take guests from Victoria Harbour to Honey Harbour. All guests and supplies had to be transported by boat since there were no roads. Accommodations were available for the night or the week. Guests had the use of boats, meals were supplied, picnic lunches created, and ice cream and confectioneries were available. The hotel was a two-story wooden structure with extensive verandahs. During the early years, Victoria House was a fishing camp without electricity or telephones.

In the 1920s, Charles Nickerson, Nathan's son, sold Victoria House to the Grisé brothers; they had operated The Royal Hotel (a four storey building with a dock c. 1903 and closed mid 1970s then demolished) across the channel on Royal Island. Fred Grisé, who had managed a liquor store in Penetanguishene until prohibition ended that venture, took over the operation of the mainland hotel. Fred's son, Didace, along with Fred's daughter-in-law, Mary, became the managers.

Under the Grisé family, the hotel became The Delawana Inn after a merger of the Victoria Hotel and the Georgian Hotel. The name was inspired by a local Chief named Delawana. His daughter, Wah-Soo-na, and her two dogs, were killed by a falling rock.

In the 1920s, more cabins were built to increase capacity. Lighting was by acetylene, water was heated by wood, laundry was done by hand and huge icehouses provided refrigeration.

By 1935, the Marine Wing was added, providing twenty more rooms, two of which had private baths. Four rooms in the main building contained a bath, eleven had running water, and the remaining seventeen had "still water service". The new kitchen had a dishwasher and oil-fired stoves. Capacity at The Delawana was one hundred guests, most of them fishermen.

Didace Grisé tried to make his hotel competitive and up–to-date. He hired dietitians to work in the kitchen; telephones were available twenty-four hours a day, CNR telegrams were sent and received, and running water was installed during the war years.

A fire happened in August 1952, which burned the main building to the ground. The Grisés did not have insurance, so they turned to private financing and reopened in the following spring. The new main building contained ten rooms, which qualified The Delawana for a beer and wine license. More units with private baths were built and the increased prices were met with some resistance. An aggressive advertising campaign soon attracted conference groups. In July 1973, a second fire destroyed the building and again the family rebuilt. Didace Grise died in 1974, leaving ownership to Mary Grise and two of her sons.

In the 1970s the bar of the Delawana Inn was the site of violent confrontations between the Hells Angels and local Ojibwa families.

Helga Loverseed of The Globe and Mail in 1993 called the "plainly decorated, turn-of-the-century" hotel "an anachronism in today's modern world", writing that unlike most of Ontario's hotels, it had not been renovated. She wrote, "Self-respecting yuppies probably wouldn't set foot in the place it isn't nearly glitzy enoughbut it's a favourite vacation venue for seniors, older 'singles' and grandparents".

== From inn to resort ==
In 1996, the resort was purchased by a development company based in Toronto. The property experienced a period of decline under this ownership and entered receivership in 2012. The resort was subsequently purchased from the bank in 2013 by APCO Developments and reopened in 2014 under new ownership as a self-catered resort.

The resort consists of guest rooms, suites, and individual cottages. In 2015, the name was changed from Delawana Inn to Delawana Resort. The word “Inn” was removed to reflect the change in operations, as the property no longer functioned as a traditional full-service inn, while retaining the historic name “Delawana.”

Since reopening, the resort has undergone gradual renovations while continuing to operate on a seasonal basis. The original main building has remained closed since the 2013 purchase and was considered structurally unsound at the time. As of the present, the future of the building remains uncertain.

In 2020, during the COVID-19 pandemic, the resort was unable to offer short-term stays due to public health restrictions. In response, the operating model shifted to offering accommodations for the full five-month season. Since that time, the majority of units have been occupied by full-season guests, although the resort continues to offer two family cottages on Delawana Road for shorter-term stays during the operating season.
