= Snowshoe Lake (Bark Lake, Ontario) =

Lake in Renfrew County, Ontario, Canada

- Location within Ontario
- Location: South Algonquin, Nipissing District and Madawaska Valley, Renfrew County, Ontario
- Coordinates: 45°26′30″N 77°52′07″W
- Primary outflows: Unnamed creek to Bark Lake
- Basin countries: Canada
- Max. length: 0.65 km (0.40 mi)
- Max. width: 0.33 km (0.21 mi)
- Surface elevation: 334 m (1,096 ft)

Snowshoe Lake is a lake in the Madawaska River drainage basin in South Algonquin, Nipissing District, about 11.5 kilometres (7.1 mi) southeast of the community of Madawaska, and Madawaska Valley, Renfrew County, about 16 kilometres (10 mi) southwest of the community of Barry's Bay, in the province Ontario, Canada. It is about 650 metres (2,133 ft) long and 330 metres (1,083 ft) wide, and lies at an elevation of 334 metres (1,096 ft). The primary outflow is an unnamed creek to Sand Bay on the west side of Bark Lake on the Madawaska River, which flows into the Ottawa River. Only a small sliver of the lake at the northwest tip lies in South Algonquin, Nipissing District.

Another Snowshoe Lake in the Madawaska River system, Snowshoe Lake (Frontenac County), lies 80 kilometres (50 mi) southeast in Frontenac County.

== See also ==
- List of lakes in Ontario
