= Duffy, Muskoka District =

Duffy
- Railway point
- Location in Southern Ontario
- Coordinates: 45°04′51″N 79°42′33″W
- Country: Canada
- Province: Ontario
- District: Muskoka
- Municipality: Muskoka Lakes
- Elevation: 231 m (758 ft)
- Time zone: UTC-5 (Eastern Time Zone)
  - Summer (DST): UTC-4 (Eastern Time Zone)

Duffy is a railway point and unincorporated place in geographic Medora Township in the municipality of Muskoka Lakes, District Municipality of Muskoka in Central Ontario, Canada. It is on the Canadian Pacific Railway main line between the railway point of Roderick to the south and the dispersed rural community of Mactier to the north. Duffy is on Haggart Creek, and adjacent to Cassady Lake (upstream) and Roderick Lake (downstream) on that creek.
