= Ravensworth, Ontario =

Ravensworth
- Location of Ravensworth in Ontario
- Coordinates: 45°34′57″N 79°07′32″W
- Country: Canada
- Province: Ontario
- District: Parry Sound
- Municipality: Kearney
- Time zone: UTC-5 (Eastern Time Zone)
  - Summer (DST): UTC-4 (Eastern Time Zone)

Ravensworth is an unincorporated place and former railway point in the municipality of Kearney, Parry Sound District in Central Ontario, Canada. It is located at the present day intersection of Rain Lake Road and the north end of Aholas Drive, about 8 kilometres (5 mi) east of the centre of Kearney. The community was once a station on the Ottawa, Arnprior and Parry Sound Railway, but it was decommissioned in 1959. The railbed was converted into Rain Lake Road to allow continued access to Ravensworth and other communities along the route.

== History ==
Ravensworth was part of the township of Bethune until 1979, when the township was incorporated into Kearney. School and road taxes where payable directly to the Province of Ontario. Although there are modern-day homes and cottages in the area, no original buildings or landmarks remain today.
