= Snowshoe Lake (Magnetawan River, Ontario) =

Lake in Parry Sound District, Ontario, Canada

- Location within Ontario
- Location: Whitestone, Parry Sound District, Ontario
- Coordinates: 45°43′54″N 80°11′08″W
- Primary outflows: Unnamed river to Doctor Lake
- Basin countries: Canada
- Max. length: 0.50 km (0.31 mi)
- Max. width: 0.18 km (0.11 mi)
- Surface elevation: 236 m (774 ft)

Snowshoe Lake is a lake in the Lake Huron drainage basin 2 kilometres (1.2 mi) northeast of the community of Burton and the Canadian National Railway line in Whitestone, Parry Sound District, Ontario, Canada. It is about 500 metres (1,640 ft) long and 180 metres (591 ft) wide, and lies at an elevation of 236 metres (774 ft). The lake drains via unnamed creek to Doctor Lake and into the South Branch of the Magnetawan River, and then either through the Magnetawan, or Harris and Naiscoot Rivers into Lake Huron.

A second Snowshoe Lake in Whitestone, Snowshoe Lake (Kimikong River, Ontario), lies 30 kilometres (19 mi) northeast and flows via the Kimikong, Pickerel and French rivers into Lake Huron.

== See also ==
- List of lakes in Ontario
