= Perry Lake (Kearney, Ontario) =

Lake in Parry Sound, Ontario, Canada

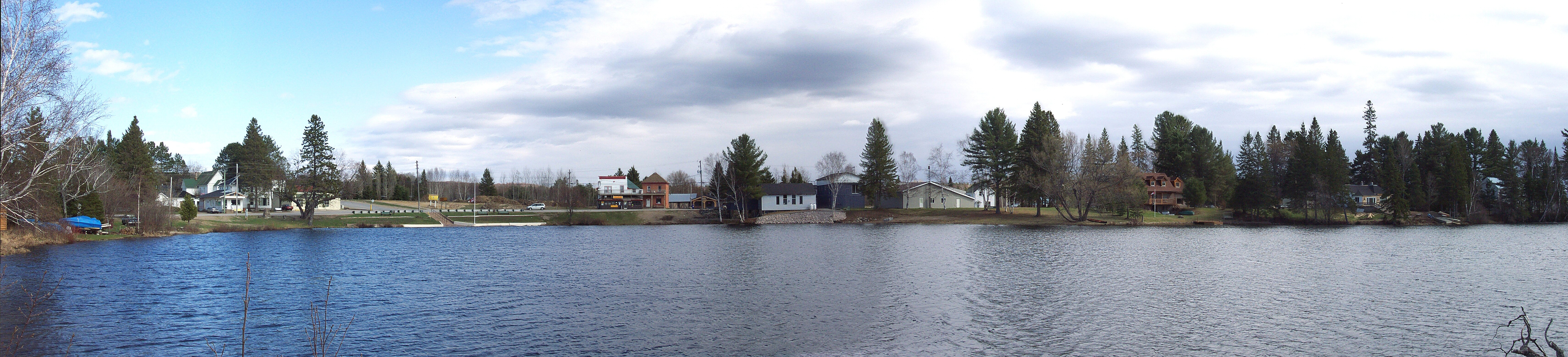
- Panorama of the north side of Perry Lake with some of Kearney's town site in the background.

- Location within Ontario
- Location: Kearney, Parry Sound District, Ontario
- Coordinates: 45°32′49″N 79°13′38″W
- Primary inflows: Magnetawan River
- Primary outflows: Magnetawan River
- Catchment area: 328 km^{2} (127 sq mi)
- Basin countries: Canada
- Surface area: 68 ha (170 acres)
- Max. depth: 13 m (43 ft)
- Shore length^{1}: 8.2 km (5.1 mi) plus 0.2 km (0.12 mi) for islands
- Surface elevation: 335 m (1,099 ft)
- Islands: Loon Island
- Settlements: Kearney, Perry
- ^{1} Shore length is not a well-defined measure.

Perry Lake (French: lac Perry) is a lake in the town of Kearney and township of Perry, Almaguin Highlands, Parry Sound District, Ontario, Canada.

The main town site and commercial area of Kearney is along the northern and eastern shores of the lake. There is a small park with a Town-maintained dock on the east shore of the lake, which is a focal point during the Summer Regatta. The Town has a second park, Kearney Lions Park that has a boardwalk along the lake, a playground, and a picnic shelter. The western and southern shores of the lake fall within the eastern boundary of Perry and has some low density residential and seasonal dwelling development.

Perry Lake is part of the Magnetawan River system. The river enters the lake at the north end after flowing through Hassard Lake and flows out of the west side of the lake towards Little Doe Lake. Water levels are regulated by the Ontario Ministry of Natural Resources and Forestry through its management of the Magnetewan River watershed, although there are no dams directly regulating inflow or outflow on the lake itself. Much of the shoreline has development along its shores with some minor wetlands.

== See also ==
- List of lakes in Ontario
