= Snowshoe Lake (Kimikong River, Ontario) =

Lake in Parry Sound District, Ontario, Canada

- Location within Ontario
- Location: Whitestone, Parry Sound District, Ontario
- Coordinates: 45°47′57″N 79°49′31″W
- Primary outflows: Unnamed creek to the Kimikong River
- Basin countries: Canada
- Max. length: 2.1 km (1.3 mi)
- Max. width: 1.1 km (0.68 mi)
- Surface elevation: 285 m (935 ft)

Snowshoe Lake is a lake in the Lake Huron drainage basin in Whitestone, Parry Sound District, Ontario, Canada, about 11 kilometres (7 mi) north of the community of Maple Island, and 15 kilometres (9 mi) southeast of the community of Arnstein. It is about 2.1 kilometres (1.3 mi) long and 1.1 kilometres (0.7 mi) wide and lies at an elevation of 285 metres (935 ft). The lake drains via an unnamed creek to the Kimikong River and then via the Pickerel and French rivers into Lake Huron.

A second Snowshoe Lake in Whitestone, Snowshoe Lake (Magnetawan River, Ontario), lies 30 kilometres (19 mi) southwest and flows via the Magnetawan River or Harris and Naiscoot Rivers into Lake Huron.

== See also ==
- List of lakes in Ontario
