= Snowshoe Lake (Thunder Bay District) =

Lake in Thunder Bay District, Ontario, Canada

- Location within Ontario
- Location: Thunder Bay District, Ontario
- Coordinates: 50°04′08″N 88°53′30″W
- Primary inflows: Unnamed creek from Camel Read Lake
- Primary outflows: Unnamed creek to Lake Nipigon
- Basin countries: Canada
- Max. length: 2.2 km (1.4 mi)
- Max. width: 1.9 km (1.2 mi)
- Surface elevation: 293 m (961 ft)

Snowshoe Lake is a lake in Thunder Bay District, Ontario, Canada, and part of the Lake Superior drainage basin. It is about 2.2 kilometres (1.4 mi) long and 1.9 kilometres (1.2 mi) wide, and lies at an elevation of 293 metres (961 ft). The primary inflow is an unnamed creek from Camel Read Lake, and primary outflow is an unnamed creek to Wabinosh Bay on Lake Nipigon (just 1.5 kilometres (0.9 mi) from the mouth of the Wabinosh River) which flows via the Nipigon River into Lake Superior.
