= Perry Lake (Nova Scotia) =

Lake in Nova Scotia, Canada

Perry Lake, Nova Scotia
- Location within Nova Scotia
- Location: Halifax Regional Municipality, Nova Scotia
- Coordinates: 44°47′46″N 63°37′15″W
- Basin countries: Canada

Perry Lake, Nova Scotia is a lake of Halifax Regional Municipality, Nova Scotia, Canada.

== See also ==
- List of lakes in Nova Scotia
