= Snowshoe Lake (Frontenac County) =

Lake in Frontenac County, Ontario, Canada

- Location within Ontario
- Location: North Frontenac, Frontenac County, Ontario
- Coordinates: 45°08′08″N 76°55′40″W
- Primary outflows: Unnamed creek to Sullivan Lake
- Basin countries: Canada
- Max. length: 0.46 km (0.29 mi)
- Max. width: 0.14 km (0.087 mi)
- Surface elevation: 354 m (1,161 ft)

Snowshoe Lake is a lake in North Frontenac, Frontenac County, Ontario, Canada, and part of the Madawaska River drainage basin. It is about 460 metres (1,509 ft) long and 140 metres (459 ft) wide, and lies at an elevation of 354 metres (1,161 ft). The primary outflow is an unnamed creek to Sullivan Lake, with the lake's waters eventually flow via the Madawaska River into the Ottawa River.

== See also ==
- List of lakes in Ontario
