= Kearney, Ontario =

Kearney
- Town (single-tier)
- Town of Kearney
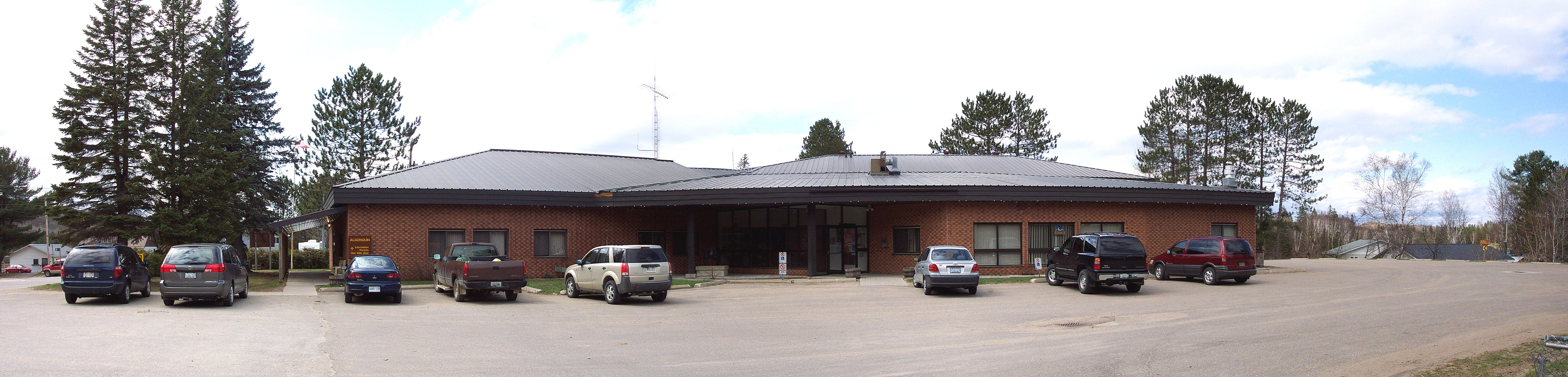
- Motto: Biggest Little Town in Ontario
- Location within Southern Ontario
- Coordinates: 45°36′N 79°07′W
- Country: Canada
- Province: Ontario
- District: Parry Sound
- Settled: 1880
- Incorporated: 1908

Government
  - Mayor: Cheryl Philip
  - Governing body: Kearney Town Council
  - MP: Scott Aitchison (CPC)
  - MPP: Graydon Smith (OPC)

Area
  - Land: 528.21 km^{2} (203.94 sq mi)

Population (2021)
  - Total: 974
  - Density: 1.8/km^{2} (4.7/sq mi)
- Time zone: UTC-5 (EST)
  - Summer (DST): UTC-4 (EDT)
- Postal Code: P0A 1M0
- Area code: 705
- Website: www.townofkearney.ca

Kearney is a town and municipality in the Almaguin Highlands region of Parry Sound District of Ontario, Canada. With a landmass of 528 square kilometres and a year-round population of 974 in the 2021 Canadian census, Kearney claims to be the "Biggest Little Town in Ontario."

== History ==
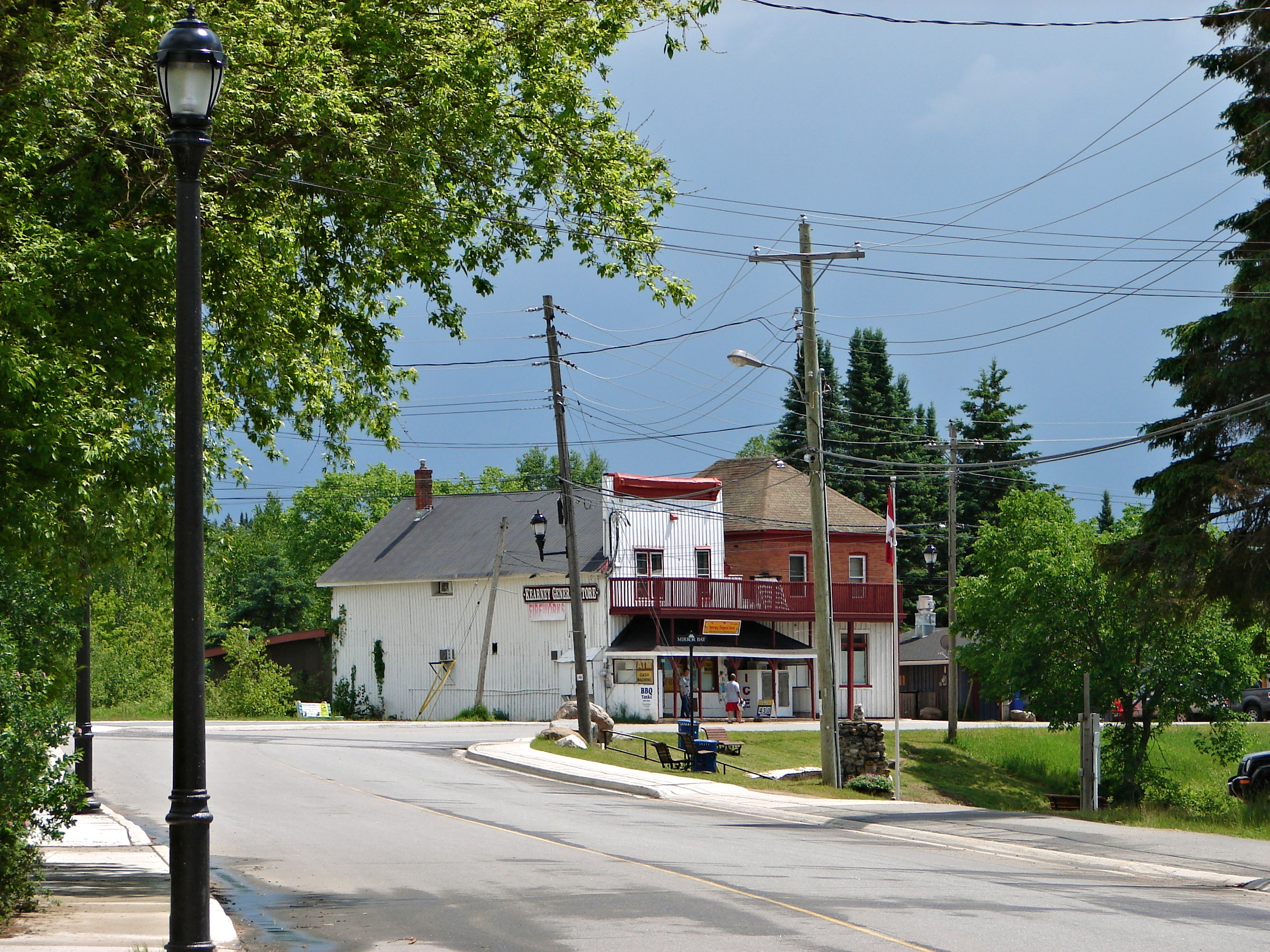
Kearney town centre

Perry Township was opened to settlement in 1873 and the first two Post Offices in the township were established at Scotia and Emsdale, on the Muskoka Road. In 1879, in the north-east corner of the township, settlers Arthur J. O'Neil and his partner William Kearney opened a store on the 12th Concession, near what is now Cherry Hill Road, (west of Beaver Lake). In the following year a post office was opened in "Kearney Store" and inherited the name for the early postmaster of the area. In those days the closest railway was the Northern at Gravenhurst from which all supplies were brought up the Muskoka Road.

Kearney prospered as a logging town with many sawmills and lumber camps. The logs were floated down the Magnetawan River, some as far as Byng Inlet.

With the arrival of the Ottawa, Arnprior and Parry Sound Railway in 1895, a siding was built at the foot of what was known as Long Lake (now Perry Lake). The commerce of the village shifted to the east side of the lake, near the railway station, where logs would be loaded onto the train after only a few days drive. In 1908, Kearney separated from the township of Perry, and it was incorporated as a town. The original parcel of land included 600 acres (2.4 km^{2}).

The Ottawa, Arnprior and Parry Sound Railway was absorbed into the Canada Atlantic Railway, which was sold to the Grand Trunk Railway in 1905. In 1923 the Grand Trunk became part of the Canadian National Railways. The track from Kearney into Algonquin Park was abandoned in 1959. The rail bed was converted into a road to allow continued access to the now ghost towns of Ryan and Ravensworth, and Rain Lake in Algonquin Park. Sections of the original frontier roads around Ryan and Ravensworth now serve as snow-mobile trails, while others have been completely abandoned and allowed to grow wild.

Through the 1970s Kearney claimed to be "The Smallest Town in Ontario." On December 1, 1979, legislation was passed to amalgamate the town of Kearney, with the geographic townships of Proudfoot and Bethune, as well as the portions of Butt and McCraney townships in Nipissing District that were not part of Algonquin Provincial Park.

== Community ==
Kearney is a gateway to Algonquin Park wilderness with three access points - one at Tim Lake, one at Magnetawan Lake and most popular, at Rain Lake. Both canoe and hiking routes can be accessed from these park entry points. In the early years, the train took visitors right into the park, with many side trips available from there. Today the roads run right back into the park's three access points. Kearney is well known as a tourist centre, and has a seasonal population of over 2500 people. Kearney's popularity is not only because of its proximity to Algonquin Park, but for its swimming, water sports, camping and fishing. Lakes within the town boundaries, including Clam, Beaver, Fisher, Grass, Island, Loon and Sand Lakes, are vacation destinations for many visitors - boasting cottages, resorts, and campgrounds. Bear, moose and deer hunting provides sport for hunters coming to the area. A restored pioneer log church at Sand Lake can be visited.

The Kearney Community Centre, which celebrated its 10th anniversary in 2000, houses the municipal offices, library, and seniors room and banquet facilities. The centre offers indoor activities during the weekdays such as card parties and special interest classes. Kearney also has a number of groups including the Royal Canadian Legion, the Lions Club, and various church and other groups.

=== Events ===
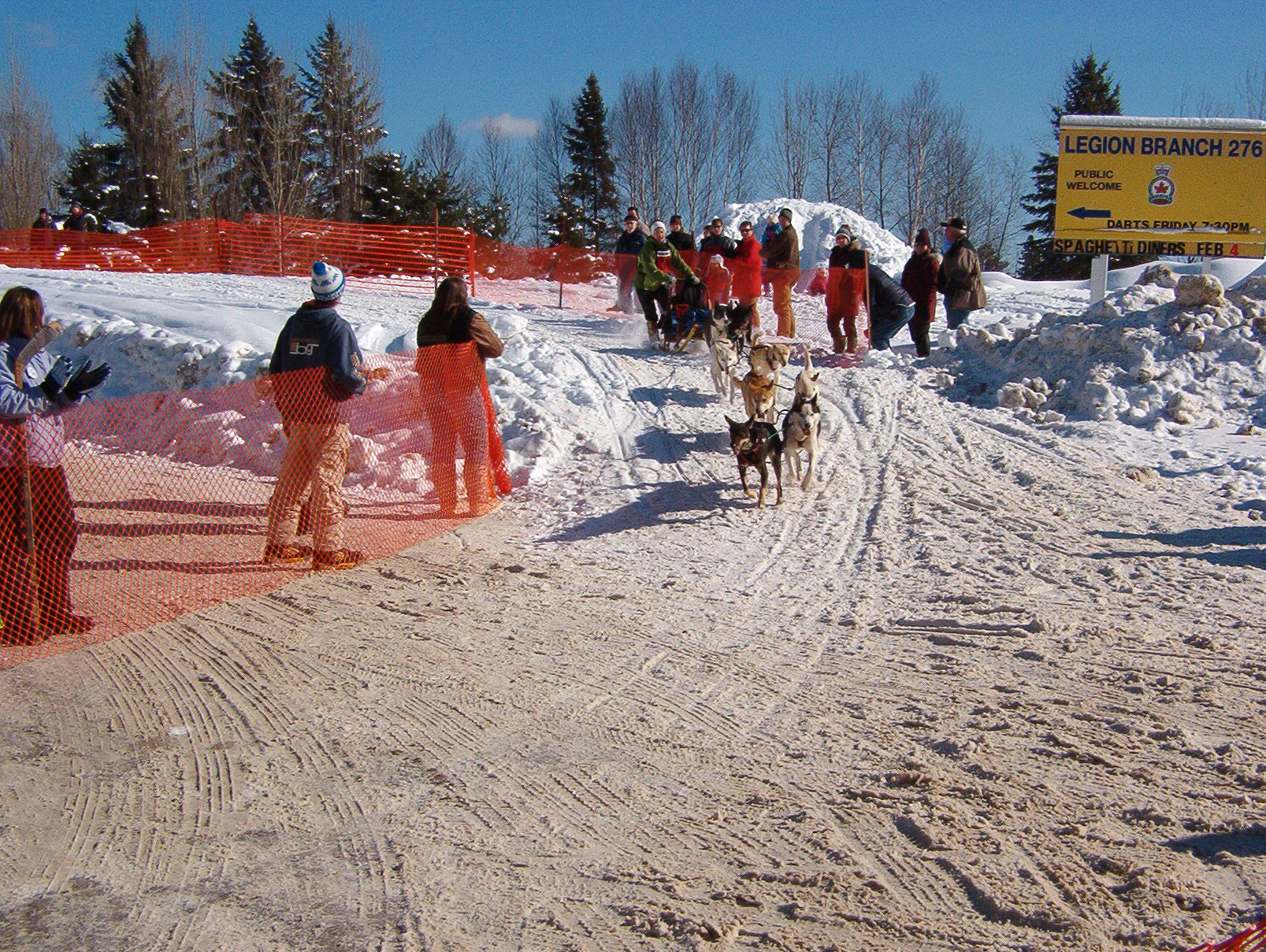
Dog Sled Races on Main Street (Feb, 2006)

Annual events include the Blackfly Festival, Lions Club Lobsterfest, Creative Changes Art Show, Sand Lake Regatta, Kearney Regatta, Kearney Lions Club Pancake Breakfast, Christmas Fun Fair and Craft Sale, the "Kearney Dog Sled Races", the firework show held every July and Sand Lake Thanksgiving Sunday Turkey Shoot.

Kearney's history of logging also helped create the trails for their dog sled races in the winter. The races, which are organized by the Kearney Dog Sled Race Committee, have grown in popularity with both spectators and racers since its inception in 1995. The mushers can choose from a number of scenic trails used for four, six, and forty mile races, and as of February 2010, a 120-mile overnight race. In addition to the races, the weekend has a full roster of family events, including cross-country skiing and ice fishing.

The local postal code of Kearney is P0A 1M0. The post office services the town with lock boxes and a rural route. Kearney is located 43 km north of Huntsville, Ontario. From Huntsville, follow Hwy 11 north until exit 244 (Emsdale), then Hwy 518 east to Kearney.

== Demographics ==
In the 2021 Census of Population conducted by Statistics Canada, Kearney had a population of 974 living in 460 of its 1,195 total private dwellings, a change of 10.4% from its 2016 population of 882. With a land area of 528.21 km^{2} (203.94 sq mi), it had a population density of 1.8/km^{2} (4.8/sq mi) in 2021.

Historical census populations – Kearney, Ontario

Year	Pop.	±%
1901	414	—
1911	812	+96.1%
1921	319	−60.7%
1931	327	+2.5%
1941	342	+4.6%
1951	399	+16.7%
1956	454	+13.8%

Year	Pop.	±%
1961	365	−19.6%
1966	316	−13.4%
1971	308	−2.5%
1976	539	+75.0%
1981	538	−0.2%
1986	547	+1.7%
1991	734	+34.2%

Year	Pop.	±%
1996	837	+14.0%
2001	773	−7.6%
2006	798	+3.2%
2011	841	+5.4%
2016	882	+4.9%
2021	974	+10.4%

Population counts are not adjusted for boundary changes.
Source: Statistics Canada

Age groups (2021):

- 0–14 years: 8.7%
- 15–64 years: 60.0%
- 65 years and over: 30.8%

Mother tongue (2021):

- English: 91.3%
- French: 1.0%
- Other: 6.7%

== Notable people ==
- Jim Proudfoot (1933– 2001), Canadian sports journalist

== See also ==
- Sand Lake (Kearney, Ontario)
- Perry Lake (Kearney, Ontario)
- List of townships in Ontario
