= Perry Lake (Minnesota) =

Lake in the state of Minnesota, United States

- Location within Minnesota
- Location: Crow Wing County, Minnesota
- Coordinates: 46°36′51″N 93°57′22″W
- Type: lake

Perry Lake is a lake in Crow Wing County, in the U.S. state of Minnesota.

According to Warren Upham, Perry Lake was probably named for a lumberman.

== See also ==
- List of lakes in Minnesota
