= Musquash River (Ontario) =

- Etymology: Abenaki word meaning "muskrat"

Location
- Country: Canada
- Province: Ontario
- Regional municipality: Muskoka

Physical characteristics
- Source: Moon River
  - location: Muskoka Lakes
  - coordinates: 45°01′19″N 79°40′47″W
  - elevation: 221 m (725 ft)
- Mouth: Georgian Bay
  - location: Georgian Bay (settlement)
  - coordinates: 44°57′34″N 79°52′52″W
  - elevation: 176 m (577 ft)
- Length: 29 km (18 mi)

Basin features
- Tributaries
  - left: Gibson River

The Musquash River is a river in Muskoka District Municipality, west Central Ontario, Canada, which splits from the Moon River and flows west into Georgian Bay. Musquash is an Abenaki word meaning "muskrat".

== Hydrology ==
Up until 1968, the river was considered to be a continuation of the Muskoka River. It begins just below Moon Chute on the Moon River at an elevation of 221 metres (725 ft) where some of that river's water leave south and then pass through the Ragged Rapids Generating Station. It enters Wahta Mohawk Territory, then flows past the Big Eddy Generating Station and dam and under Highway 400, through Gray Lake and enters Go Home Lake at an elevation of 185 metres (607 ft). Some of the lake's waters leaves at the west via the Go Home River, while the rest exits over the Go Home Lake Dam as the Musquash River. The river then takes in the left tributary Gibson River, turns west, passes through Three Rock Chute and exits into the Musquash Channel on Georgian Bay, Lake Huron at an elevation of 176 metres (577 ft).

== Settlements ==
Near the end of the 19th century, a lumber town called Muskoka Mills was located at the mouth of the river.

== In popular culture ==
The Musquash River and Muskoka Mills are the setting for Slaid Cleaves' song Breakfast in Hell, about a doomed lumberjack who motivates his men to break a logjam in 1899.

== See also ==
- List of rivers of Ontario
