= Moon River (Ontario) =

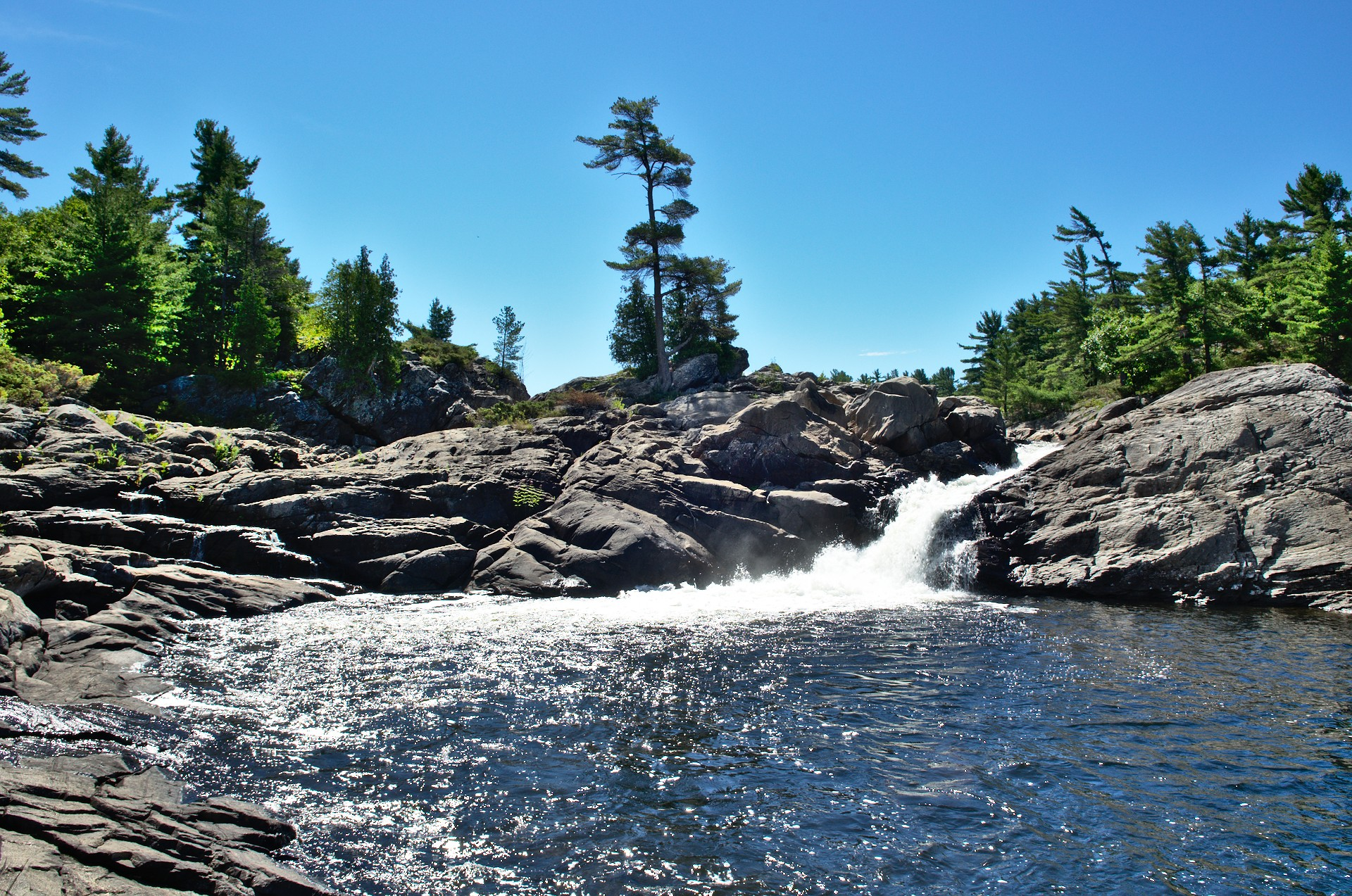
- The main falls of Moon River Falls where it empties into Moon River Bay, Georgian Bay, Lake Huron

- Location of the mouth of the river in Southern Ontario
- Etymology: From the Ojibwa moonz-ziibi, "moose river"

Location
- Country: Canada
- Province: Ontario
- Region: Central Ontario
- District: Muskoka
- Municipalities: Georgian Bay; Muskoka Lakes

Physical characteristics
- Source: Lake Muskoka
  - location: Bala, Muskoka Lakes
  - coordinates: 45°00′49″N 79°36′51″W
  - elevation: 225 m (738 ft)
- Mouth: Georgian Bay
  - location: Georgian Bay, Ontario
  - coordinates: 45°06′57″N 79°58′12″W
  - elevation: 176 m (577 ft)

Basin features
- River system: Great Lakes Basin
- Tributaries
  - right: Haggart Creek

The Moon River is a river in the municipalities of Georgian Bay and Muskoka Lakes, District Municipality of Muskoka in Central Ontario, Canada. It flows from Lake Muskoka at the community of Bala to Georgian Bay, Lake Huron, south of Parry Sound. The name of the river is thought to be derived from its Ojibwa name moonz-ziibi, which means "moose river".

== Course ==
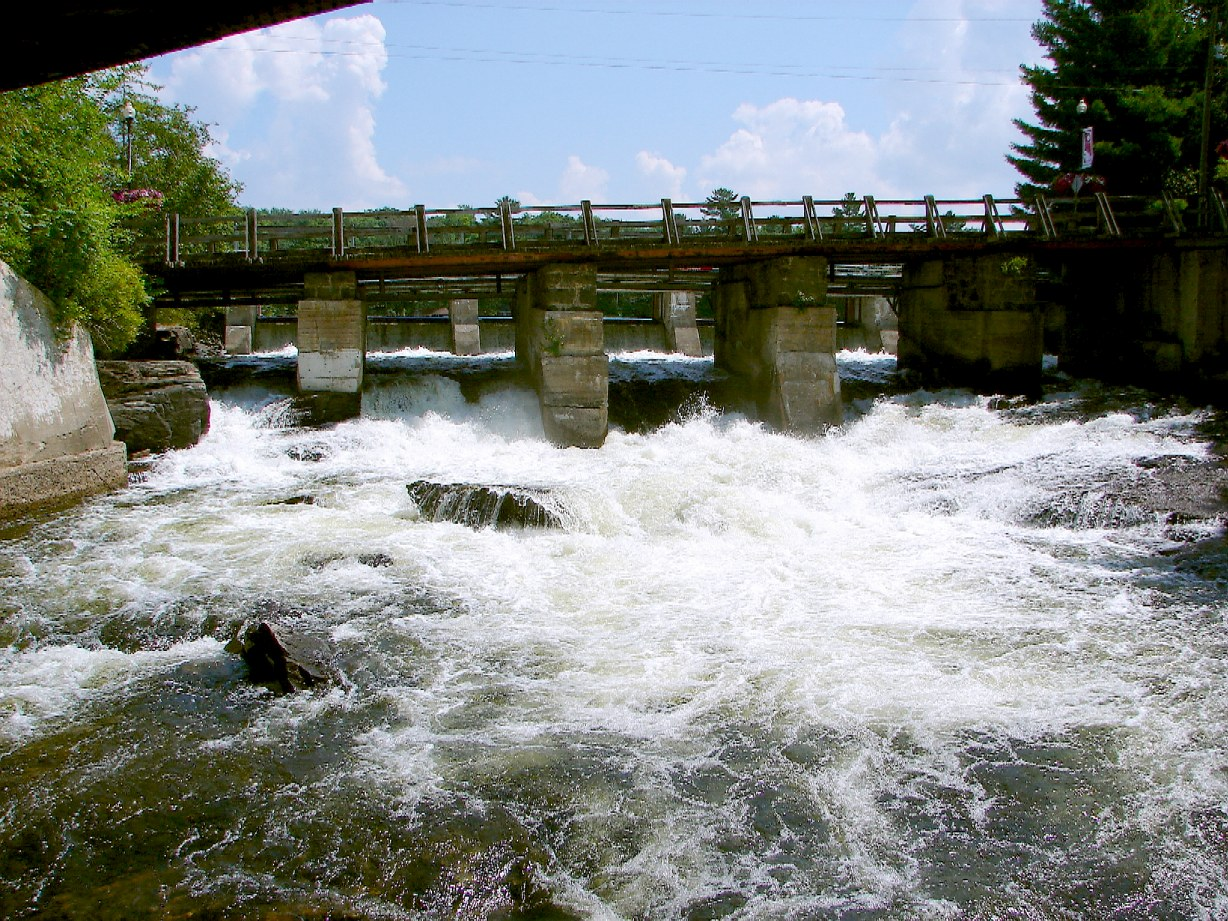
Bala Falls at the head of the Moon River

The river begins at the Bala Falls in the community of Bala, where those falls drain Lake Muskoka. The river heads northwest, passes through Moon Chute, at which point the Musquash River diverges to the south. The river continues northwest and passes into Wahta Mohawk Territory, flows over the Island Portage Falls, takes in the right tributary Haggart Creek, and passes into the municipality of Georgian Bay. The Moon River continues northwest, flows over Jack Knife Rapids then under Ontario Highway 400, and passes through Moon River Conservation Reserve. It enters the Lower Moon River Conservation Reserve (which continues to the river mouth), passes over the Twin Rapids, flows past the community of Moon River, and reaches its mouth at Arnolds Bay on Georgian Bay, Lake Huron.

The section of the Moon River from Bala to Moon Chute and the Musquash River were officially considered to be a continuation of the Muskoka River until 1968.

== Natural history ==
This area around Moon River is known to be the home of the Eastern Massasauga Rattlesnake, one of the few rattlesnake species found in Canada.

== Recreational opportunities ==
The Moon River is a traditional canoe route passing through provincial conservation reserves named Moon River and Lower Moon River. Lower Moon River Conservation Reserve is also accessible by power boat from Georgian Bay to the base of Moon Falls. Crown land camping occurs at sites along the river, and below Moon Falls. Both sites are used for a variety of hunting activities, and angling for a variety of fish species occurs throughout both sites.

== Floods ==
In Spring of 2013 Muskoka Lakes region experienced a flood that at the time was touted as “the worst flooding in 100 years”. The flood of 2019 measurably exceeded the levels of the 2013 flooding.

Marc Garneau, Minister of Transport Canada, issued an interim order on April 30, 2019 prohibiting all non-emergency vessels from Moon River due to flooding. On that day Moon River was discharging at the rate of up to 361 m³/s, a flow sufficient to fill up an Olympic size swimming pool in under seven seconds. Regular regulated summer time discharge rate of Moon River is approximately 5 m³/s.

== See also ==
- List of rivers of Ontario
