= Georgian Bay, Ontario =

Georgian Bay
- Township (lower-tier)
- Township of Georgian Bay
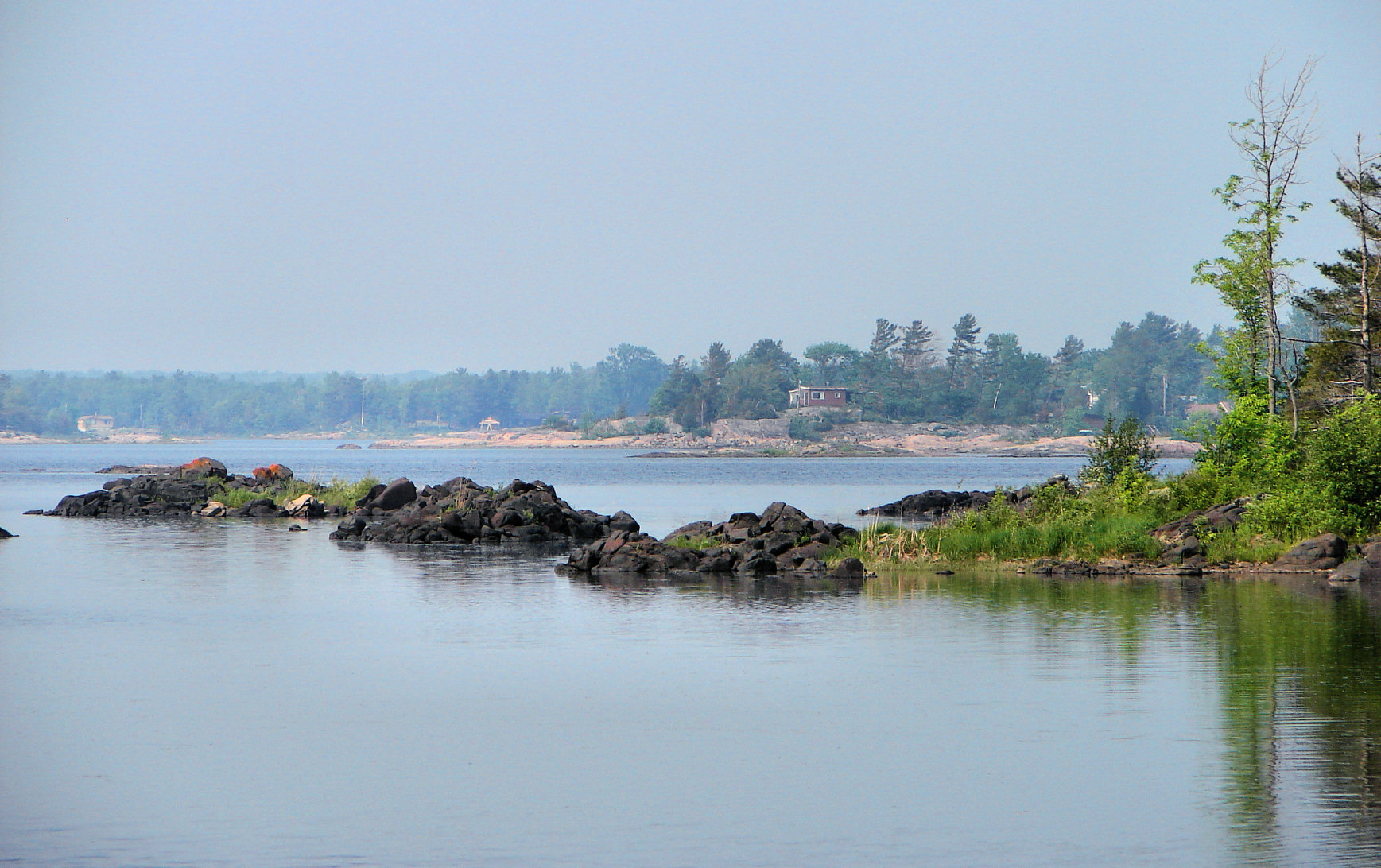

- Location within Southern Ontario
- Coordinates: 44°59′N 79°49′W
- Country: Canada
- Province: Ontario
- District municipality: Muskoka
- Incorporated: January 1, 1971

Government
  - Type: Township
  - Mayor: Peter Koetsier
  - Governing Body: Georgian Bay Township Council
  - MP: Scott Aitchison (CPC)
  - MPP: Graydon Smith (OPC)

Area
  - Land: 525.29 km^{2} (202.82 sq mi)

Population (2021)
  - Total: 3,441
  - Density: 6.6/km^{2} (17/sq mi)
- Time zone: UTC-5 (EST)
  - Summer (DST): UTC-4 (EDT)
- Postal code span: L0K
- Area codes: 705, 249
- Website: www.gbtownship.ca

The Township of Georgian Bay is an area municipality of the District Municipality of Muskoka, in south-central Ontario, Canada. It is located on the Severn River, where it empties into the eponymous Georgian Bay. The municipal offices are at Port Severn.

This township is the administrative centre of the Moose Deer Point Ojibway First Nation reserve.

== History ==
The township was created on January 1, 1971, when Freeman Township was amalgamated with parts of unorganized areas of Muskoka District as part of the district's restructuring.

== Geography ==
=== Communities ===
The township contains the communities:

- Bayview Park
- Big Chute
- Cedar Nook
- Crooked Bay
- Franceville
- Go Home
- Honey Harbour
- Macey Bay
- MacTier
- Moon River
- Port Severn (partially)
- Potters Landing
- South Bay
- Wolverine Beach
- Wood Landing

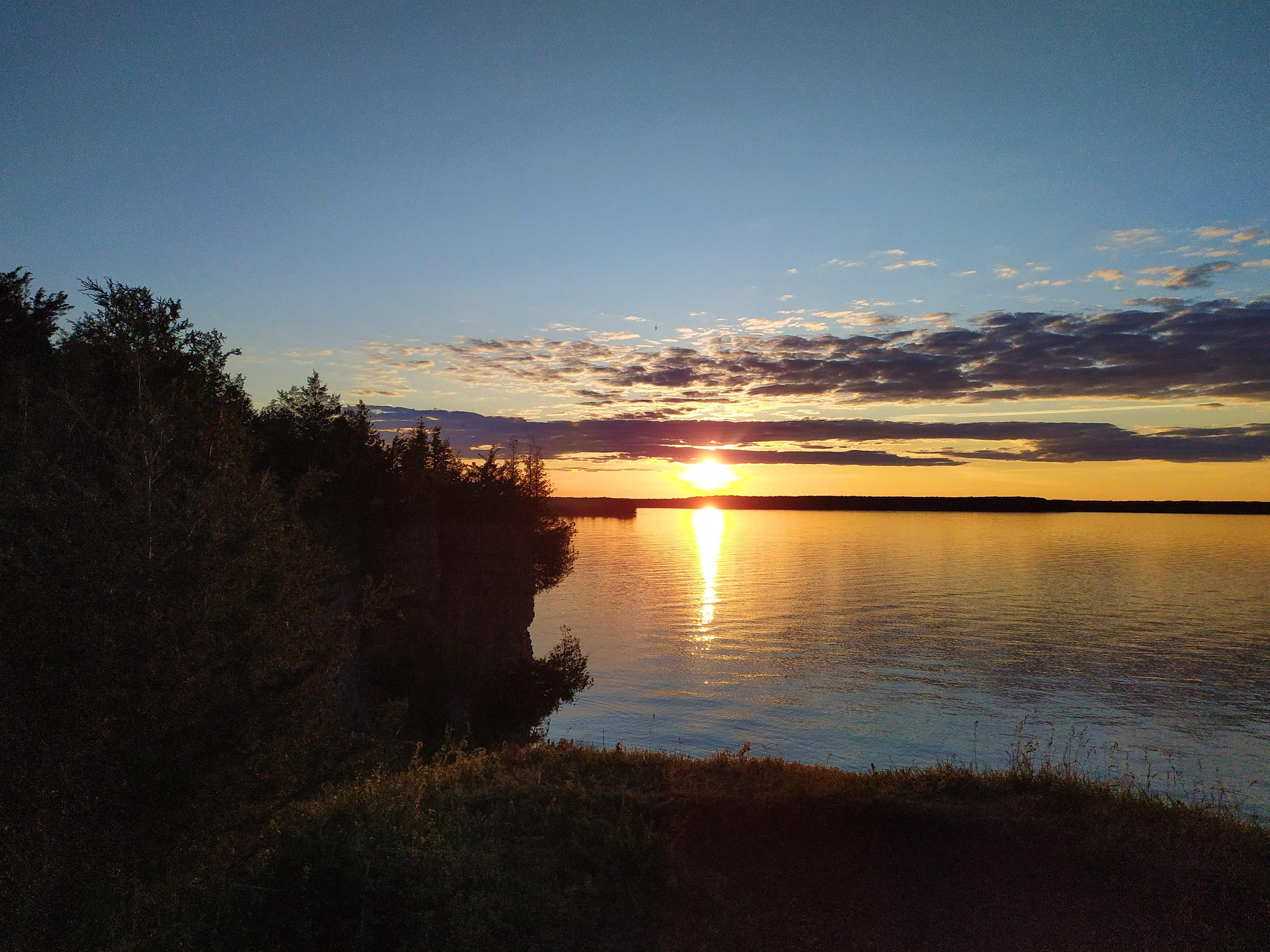
Little Bluff Conservation Area in South Bay

Honey Harbour serves as a launching point to the "30,000 Islands" that make up the Georgian Bay geography. The islands, that are accessible from Honey Harbour, are dotted with hundreds to thousands of cottages. The cottages serve mostly as summer residences. Many very large cottages have been built recently, which has resulted in an increase in property values. The economic cycle of Honey Harbour is tied to the cycle of the cottagers. Honey Harbour has a small grocery store ("Towne Centre" and Picnic Island Resort, which features its own general store and gas bar), a post office, a liquor store, a bakery, a Catholic church and school, a public elementary school, several small craft stores, a large resort (the "Delawana Resort"), and several marinas. In addition to cottages, there are multiple waterfront trailer park resorts. There are also numerous clean beaches lining both the shore and islands, inhabited by the diverse Ontario wildlife.

The double H of Honey Harbour is a play on founder's name, Harvey Hewitt, of Pasadena, California. Hewitt was also the original pioneer and co-developer of Woolite.

=== Water bodies ===
- Gibson Lake
- Gloucester Pool
- Go Home Lake
- Six Mile Lake
- Severn River
- Georgian Bay
- Stewart Lake
- Bear Lake

== Demographics ==
In the 2021 Census of Population conducted by Statistics Canada, Georgian Bay had a population of 3,441 living in 1,660 of its 5,175 total private dwellings, a change of 36.9% from its 2016 population of 2,514. With a land area of 525.29 km^{2} (202.82 sq mi), it had a population density of 6.6/km^{2} (17.0/sq mi) in 2021.

Canada census – Georgian Bay community profile

	2021	2016	2011
Population	3,441 (+36.9% from 2016)	2,499 (0.7% from 2011)	2,482 (6.1% from 2006)
Land area	525.29 km^{2} (202.82 sq mi)	547.61 km^{2} (211.43 sq mi)	546.97 km^{2} (211.19 sq mi)
Population density	6.6/km^{2} (17/sq mi)	4.6/km^{2} (12/sq mi)	4.5/km^{2} (12/sq mi)
Median age	58.4 (M: 58.4, F: 58.4)	56.2 (M: 55.9, F: 56.4)
Private dwellings	5,175 (total) 1,660 (occupied)	4,700 (total)	5,173 (total)
Median household income	$82,000	$59,981

References: 2021 2016 2011

Historical census populations – Georgian Bay, Ontario

Year	Pop.	±%
1971	2,054	—
1976	2,122	+3.3%
1981	2,071	−2.4%
1986	2,031	−1.9%
1991	2,178	+7.2%
1996	2,230	+2.4%

Year	Pop.	±%
2001	1,991	−10.7%
2006	2,340	+17.5%
2011	2,482	+6.1%
2016	2,499	+0.7%
2021	3,441	+37.7%

2011 Population figure based on revised count. Population counts are not adjusted for boundary changes.
Source: Statistics Canada

== Local government ==
Georgian Bay is governed by a mayor and four councillors, with each councillor representing each of the four municipal wards. As of the 2022 election, the elected council members are:

- Mayor: Peter Koetsier
- Councillors:
  - Ward 1: Steven Predko
  - Ward 2: Stephen Jarvis
  - Ward 3: Kristian Graziano
  - Ward 4: Allan Hazelton

== Culture ==
=== Library ===
There are library branches in Honey Harbour and MacTier and a satellite library branch in the new Township Community Services Building in Port Severn. Those libraries are popular destinations for recreational reading materials, DVDs, and tourist information. Services include information and reference services, access to full text databases, community information, internet access, reader's advisory services, programs for children, youth and adults, delivery to homebound individuals, interlibrary loan, and free downloadable audiobooks.

The libraries' collection includes business directories, phone books, maps, government publications, books, periodicals, genealogy, and local history.

== Transportation ==
Intercity motor coach service to MacTier is available through Ontario Northland along its Toronto–Barrie–Parry Sound–Sudbury route's local schedule. MacTier is bypassed by express schedules but still receives twice-daily service northbound and southbound.

== See also ==
- List of townships in Ontario
