= Little Madawaska River =

Little Madawaska River may refer to:

- Little Madawaska River (Maine)
- Little Madawaska River (Ontario)

== See also ==
- Madawaska River (disambiguation)
