= Madawaska River =

Madawaska River may refer to:

- Madawaska River (Ontario) in Eastern Ontario
- Little Madawaska River (Ontario) in Ontario which flows into the Petawawa River
- Madawaska River (Saint John River tributary) in northwestern New Brunswick and eastern Quebec
- Little Madawaska River (Maine) in northeastern Maine which flows into the Aroostook River

== See also ==
- Madawaska (disambiguation)
