= Crow River (Ontario) =

- Location of the mouth of the Crow River in Ontario

Location
- Country: Canada
- Ontario: Ontario
- Region: Northeastern Ontario
- District: Nipissing
- Municipality: Nipissing, Unorganized South Part

Physical characteristics
- Source: Inez Lake
  - location: Freswick township
  - coordinates: 45°47′58″N 78°30′59″W
  - elevation: 431 m (1,414 ft)
- Mouth: Petawawa River
  - location: White township
  - coordinates: 45°57′31″N 78°10′56″W
  - elevation: 265 m (869 ft)

Basin features
- River system: Saint Lawrence River drainage basin

The Crow River is a river in the Saint Lawrence River drainage basin in the Unorganized South Part of Nipissing District in northeastern Ontario, Canada. The river lies entirely within Algonquin Provincial Park and is a right tributary of the Petawawa River.

== Course ==
The river begins at Inez Lake in the geographic township of Freswick and flows south into Bower geographic township to Redrock Lake, then east to Proulx Lake and then northwest to Little Crow Lake and Big Crow Lake. It heads northeast over a series of rapids, enters Anglin geographic township and reaches Crow Bay on Lavielle Lake. The river leaves northeast over the Lake Lavielle Dam, enters White geographic township, passes over a series of rapids, turns northwest, then heads north and reaches its mouth at the Petawawa River. The Petawawa River flows via the Ottawa River to the Saint Lawrence River.

== Tributaries ==
- Moon Creek (left)
- White Partridge Creek (right)
- Okahan Creek (left)
- Lavielle Lake
  - Thomas Creek (right)
  - Osprey Creek (right)
  - Dickson Creek (right)
  - Farncomb Creek (left)
  - Abbe Creek (left)
  - Woodcock Creek (left)
- Thrush Creek (left)
- Shadfly Creek (left)
- Koko Creek (right)
- Nepawin Creek (left)
- Diver Creek (right)

== See also ==
- List of rivers of Ontario

== Sources ==
- McMurtrie, Jeffrey (2008). "Algonquin Provincial Park and the Haliburton Highlands". Wikimedia Commons. Archived from the original on 2011-06-29.
- Map 9 (PDF) (Map). 1 : 700,000. Official road map of Ontario. Ministry of Transportation of Ontario. 2010-01-01.
- Restructured municipalities - Ontario map #5 (Map). Restructuring Maps of Ontario. Ontario Ministry of Municipal Affairs and Housing. 2006. Archived from the original on 2020-05-11.
