= Tim River =

- Location of the mouth of the Tim River in Ontario

Location
- Country: Canada
- Ontario: Ontario
- Region: Northeastern Ontario
- District: Nipissing
- Part: Nipissing, Unorganized South

Physical characteristics
- Source: Tim Lake
  - location: Butt Township
  - coordinates: 45°45′21″N 79°00′49″W
  - elevation: 448 m (1,470 ft)
- Mouth: Petawawa River
  - location: Bishop Township
  - coordinates: 45°47′16″N 78°40′04″W
  - elevation: 395 m (1,296 ft)

Basin features
- River system: Saint Lawrence River drainage basin

The Tim River is a river in the Saint Lawrence River drainage basin in the Unorganized South Part of Nipissing District in northeastern Ontario, Canada. The river is entirely within Algonquin Provincial Park, and is a left tributary of the Petawawa River.

== Course ==
The river begins at Tim Lake in geographic Butt Township and flows east over Tim Lake Dam, enters geographic Devine Township, passes through Rosebary Lake and reaches Longbow Lake. It leaves the lake over Longbow Lake Dam, continues east into geographic Bishop Township, passes through Shippagew Lake, and empties into Longer Lake on the Petawawa River. The Petawawa flows via the Ottawa River to the Saint Lawrence River.

== Tributaries ==
- Little Trout Creek (right)
- David Creek (right)
- Pezheki Creek (right)
- Longbow Lake
  - Vanity Creek (left)

== See also ==
- List of rivers of Ontario

== Sources ==
- McMurtrie, Jeffrey (2008). "Algonquin Provincial Park and the Haliburton Highlands". Wikimedia Commons. Archived from the original on 2011-06-29.
- Map 9 (PDF) (Map). 1 : 700,000. Official road map of Ontario. Ministry of Transportation of Ontario. 2010-01-01.
- Restructured municipalities - Ontario map #5 (Map). Restructuring Maps of Ontario. Ontario Ministry of Municipal Affairs and Housing. 2006.
