= Madawaska =

Madawaska may refer to:

== Places ==
=== Canada ===
==== New Brunswick ====
- Madawaska County, New Brunswick
- Madawaska Parish, New Brunswick
- Madawaska (provincial electoral district), a former provincial electoral district (1874–1973)
- Madawaska Centre, a former provincial electoral district (1973–1994)
- Madawaska-la-Vallée, a former provincial electoral district (1994–2006)
- Madawaska-les-Lacs, a former provincial electoral district (1973–2013)
- Madawaska les Lacs-Edmundston, provincial electoral district (2013–)
- Madawaska South, a former provincial electoral district (1973–1994)
- Republic of Madawaska, a former unrecognized state in Madawaska County (1827)
- Madawaska River (Saint John River), in Quebec and New Brunswick
- The region around the Upper Saint John River (Bay of Fundy) in Maine and New Brunswick

==== Ontario ====
- Greater Madawaska
- Madawaska River (Ontario)
- Madawaska, Ontario
- Madawaska Valley, Ontario
- Camp Madawaska, a former Salvation Army camp in Nipissing District

=== United States ===
- Madawaska, Maine, a town
  - Madawaska (CDP), Maine, a census-designated place within the above town

== Other uses ==
- USS Madawaska

== See also ==
- Madawaska River (disambiguation)
