= Gilmour Lumber Company =

The Gilmour Lumber Company was one of the giants of the Canadian timber industry. Their involvement in lumbering began modestly in the 1790s in the area of Glasgow, Scotland where Allan Gilmour Sr. started a small timber merchandising business. In 1804 he entered into a partnership with his cousins John and Arthur and formed Pollock, Gilmour and Company. Pollock, Gilmour and Company became ship owners and imported products in Europe and the Baltic region.

The Gilmour Lumber Company established its first Canadian branch at Douglastown, New Brunswick, near the mouth of the Miramichi River in 1812. Subsequently, Gilmour opened a sawmill in Trois-Rivières, Quebec. By the 1840s the company was split; with brothers Allan Jr., John and David operating the Quebec City branch, and a younger Allan Gilmour running the Montreal branch under the name Gilmour and Company. They established shipbuilding yards at Quebec City, and Saint John and the Miramichi region of New Brunswick. By the 1840s they commanded a fleet of 130 vessels, one of the largest shipping operations in the world.

In 1852 Gilmour and Company constructed a sawmill at the Trent Port location along the Bay of Quinte (now Trenton, Ontario). Over four decades the mill would grow to be the largest sawmill in the world. As Long and Whiteman wrote in their comprehensive study, When Giants Fall: The Gilmour Quest for Algonquin Pine: "The main sawmill stood on the south western part of the property. Two and one-half storeys high, it measured some 30 metres wide and 43 metres long. Piling grounds for lumber were situated to the east and north, and the shipping docks to the south. Railway tracks provided access to both areas from the mill. Along these horses hauled carloads of lumber."

== David Gilmour ==
By the late 1800s most of the Scottish and Quebec branches of the Gilmour operation were closed. In 1879 David Gilmour (born in Scotland in 1851, the son of John Gilmour) at the age of just 29, took over management of the Trenton operation. Though Gilmour Lumber had operated in Trenton since 1852, David Gilmour was the first partner to take up a permanent residence there. He moved into a mansion at the top of Dundas street known as Prospect House. It boasted a commanding view of the town, the Bay of Quinte, and the mill operation at the foot of Dundas street. As Trenton's leading industrialist David Gilmour became the town's leading benefactor. In the winters he served as president of the curling and toboggan clubs. In the summers he led the cricket and rowing clubs. He donated the land for the town's first skating rink. In 1885 the Gilmour Fire Brigade Band was established, playing local functions and events across southern Ontario.

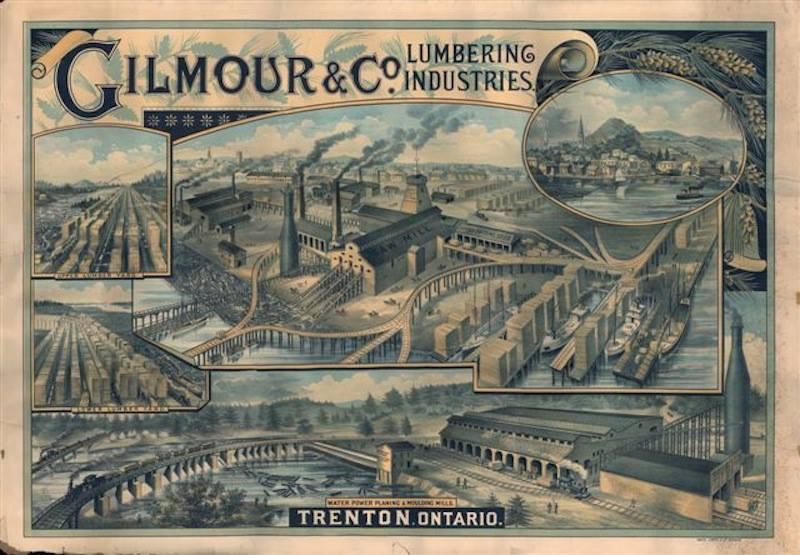
The Gilmour lumber mill in Trenton, Ontario

As an employer Gilmour's lumber mill was a state-of-the-art, highly mechanized operation. In 1880 the town's first telephone system was installed at the mill. In 1882 the rail line was connected to the Grand Trunk Railway. After several fires, Gilmour installed a modern sprinkler system. Gilmour owned over 700 tenement housing units for his employees. To power his operations he built one of the world's first hydro-electric plants.

== Timber Auction of 1892 ==
Like most lumber barons, Gilmour and Company received most of its product from the northern timber limits of what is now the Algonquin Park region. The trees would be felled in the forests by men living in work camps, then floated down the regional waterways of the Kawartha lake region to their final destination; the Gilmour Mill along the Trent River, at the mouth of the Bay of Quinte. From here the timber would be processed then loaded onto ships that would carry the lumber along the Saint Lawrence River to destinations in the United States and Europe.

But after 40 years of constant harvesting these limits were becoming exhausted. Part of the problem was the size of the Gilmour operation in Trenton. In the March 1888 issue of Canada Lumberman a writer commented, "You think you have big mills in the United States, but the best of them dwindle into comparative insignificance alongside of the Gilmour mill, which has a capacity of 900,000 feet per day..." The truth was that the Gilmour mill hadn't run anywhere near to full capacity in some years, and many smaller mills in the region produced more lumber, and were more profitable.

Situated in the remote northern interior, the Algonquin highland forest was a prized timber berth the Ontario government put up for auction in October 1892. The auction was held in Toronto and the old parliament buildings. David Gilmour attended the auction along with his brother Allan, with David handling the bidding for the firm personally. When the auction had ended 1,650 square kilometres (640 sq mi) of virgin pine had been sold for $2,308,475. David Gilmour was the biggest spender purchasing 225 square kilometres (87 sq mi) of contiguous land along the northern Peck Township (the Canoe and Joe Lake region). But at a price of $703,875 many believed David Gilmour foolish to have handled the bidding himself, and that he over-paid for the timber rights.

== The Gilmour Tramway ==
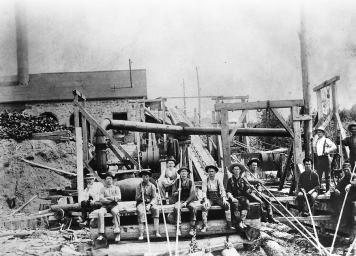
The first jackladder at the foot of Lake of Bays

Shortly after the auction, winning bidders aggressively began to set up lumber camps in the Algonquin highland forest. Gilmour established a main depot at Tea Lake, several shanty camps along the company's limits and eventually a mill on Canoe Lake in the village of Mowat. But a major obstacle quickly became apparent. Gilmour needed to get their logs to Trenton. Canoe and Tea Lakes did flow into the Oxtongue River, but Oxtongue flowed in the wrong direction, southwesterly into the Lake of Bays and ultimately Georgian Bay. Gilmour needed water transport that flowed southeasterly into the Trent River system. Gilmour's solution was an ingenious piece of environmental engineering. Gilmour would drive his logs down the Oxtongue to Lake of Bays, but once there near the village of Dorset, the logs would be lifted up 36 metres (118 ft) from the Lake of Bays and carried overland 1,800 metres (5,900 ft) to Raven Lake. From Raven Lake the logs could float southeasterly to the Trenton mill.

The system Gilmour employed was the construction of a "tramway". At the base of Lake of Bays Gilmour would construct a jackladder, a conveyor mechanism that carried the logs up the hillside. At the top Gilmour then would construct a log slide. Filled with flowing water, the log slide would float the timber to a damn. Once at the damn a second jackladder would carry the logs to the mouth of Lake Raven. Jackladders and log slides were not new ideas, the lumber industry had been using them for decades. David Gilmour's feat of engineering genius was putting the existing technologies together.

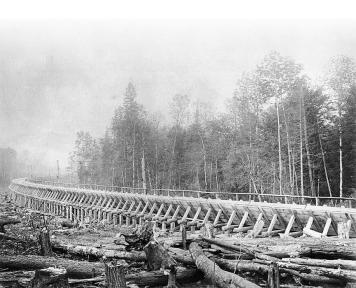
Gilmour tramway trough

The tramway was expensive to construct and maintain. Although mechanized, the operation required over 100 men to operate the engines and monitor the transport the logs along the 1,800 metre journey. A major obstacle was the sheer distance of the journey. Navigating the Ontario waterways, it would take a log drive 445 kilometres (277 mi) to travel from the Algonquin highlands to Trenton. Routinely it could take logs two years to travel from the interior to the Trenton mill, but adding the challenges of the tramway could add an additional 2 years to that journey. A log felled at Canoe Lake in 1894 might not reach Trenton until 1898. Many of the logs rotted or sunk. Because the Algonquin Highland was so far north, the spring thaw occurred much later in the season, shortening the time available for summer log drives before waterways began to freeze up again in the fall. To make matters worse, much of the pine cut from the auctioned tracks was of poor quality. The tramway operated for two seasons before Gilmour abandoned the project in 1896.

== The Mill at Canoe Lake ==
In the spring of 1896 David Gilmour and his brother Allan decided to construct a mill at Mowat village on Canoe Lake. Times had changed, and John Booth's Ottawa, Arnprior & Parry Sound Railway was soon to reach Canoe Lake. A 2 kilometre rail spur merely needed to be constructed from the Mowat mill to the Booth rail station to the north, and finished lumber could be transported out west to Parry Sound or east to the Ottawa River.

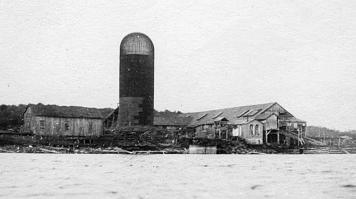
The abandoned mill at Canoe lake

By the spring of 1897 Gilmour and Company's new mill was operating at Canoe Lake. Gilmour salvaged used parts from his former projects in the construction of the mill. Eight boilers, saws and other equipment were re-purposed from the Trenton mill, which now sat idle on the Bay of Quinte. The boiler and two steam engines left over from the tramway were shipped overland from Lake of Bays to Canoe Lake. The village at Canoe lake - named Mowat after an influential politician at the time - was a company operation. There were approximately 500 workers, with a hospital, horse stables, a warehouse, cookhouse, storehouses and offices, mill workers houses, boarding houses and a cemetery. David Gilmour constructed two summer homes on an island one mile from the shores of Mowat (now Gilmour island). Occupied by him and his brother Allan, these elegant two-storey homes exist to this day.

Mowat and Canoe lake would figure prominently over a decade later when in 1912 Canadian artist Tom Thomson began visiting the area and produced the majority of his greatest work.

The Canoe lake mill would operate for barely five seasons. The country was coming out of a national depression, and Gilmour was faced with mounting debts. By September 1901 the mill ceased operations and all the men came home to Trenton. David Gilmour stayed on to witness the demise of his lumber empire for another four years. In 1903 tragedy struck when David's brother Allan Gilmour died after accidentally shooting himself in the back of the head while preparing for a fishing trip. In 1905 David Gilmour moved his family to Buffalo, New York, where he purchased a door factory. In 1909 the big sawmill on the shores of the Trent river and the Bay of Quinte was torn down.
