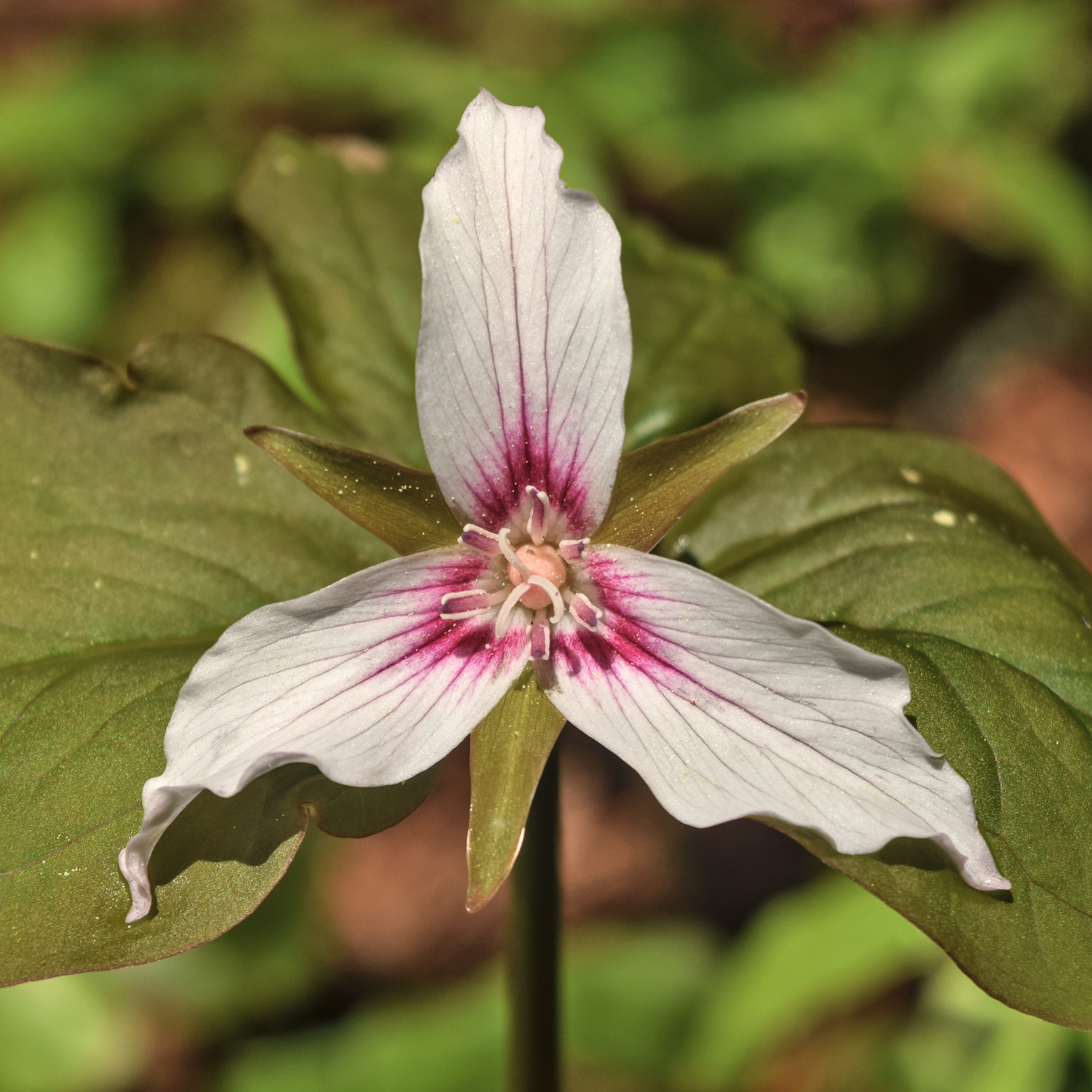
- Blooming in Algonquin Provincial Park (Ontario, Canada).

Conservation status
- Secure (NatureServe)

Scientific classification
- Kingdom: Plantae
- Clade: Embryophytes
- Clade: Tracheophytes
- Clade: Angiosperms
- Clade: Monocots
- Order: Liliales
- Family: Melanthiaceae
- Genus: Trillium
- Species: T. undulatum

Binomial name
- Trillium undulatum Willd.

Synonyms
- Trillium undulatum: Trillidium undulatum (Willd.) Floden & E.E.Schill.; Trillium cleavelandicum Alph.Wood; Trillium erythrocarpum Michx.; Trillium pictum Pursh; Trillium undulatum f. cleavelandicum (Alph.Wood) Fernald; Trillium undulatum f. enotatum T.S.Patrick; Trillium undulatum f. polymerum Vict. ex Louis-Marie; Trillium undulatum f. striatum Louis-Marie

= Trillium undulatum =

Species of flowering plant

Trillium undulatum, commonly called painted trillium, painted lady (not to be confused with the painted lady butterfly), or trille ondulé in French, is a species of flowering plant in the bunchflower family Melanthiaceae. It is also known as smiling wake robin or striped wake-robin. The specific epithet undulatum means "wavy", which refers to the wavy edges of the flower petals. The plant is found from Ontario in the north to northern Georgia in the south and from Michigan in the west to Nova Scotia in the east.

== Description ==
Trillium undulatum is a perennial herbaceous plant that spreads by means of an underground rhizome. It has three large leaf-like bracts arranged in a whorl about a scape (stem) that rises directly from the rhizome. The bracts (leaves) are ovate, each with a definite petiole (leaf stalk).

Flowering occurs from late April to the end of June. The single, terminal flower is pedicellate (on a stalk) with three sepals and three petals. The white petals have wavy edges with a red to reddish purple splotch at the base of each petal. The white ovary usually has a pink tip with no sharp edges.

If the flower is successfully pollinated, a single fruit develops. Initially the fruit is green, ripening to a bright red by mid to late summer. The fruit is a berry-like capsule, 1 to 2 cm (0.5 to 1 in) long, with no ridges. No other North American Trillium species has a fruit of this size, color, and shape.

Trillium undulatum is one of a dozen pedicellate-flowered Trillium species known to occur throughout its range, yet it is one of the easiest trilliums to identify. First check the leaves, each of which has a distinct petiole at least 4 mm (0.2 in) in length. Other Trillium species occasionally have leaves with petioles, so check the pedicel (flower stalk) to confirm. The pedicel of Trillium undulatum is short and erect. If the leaves have no petioles, or the pedicel is greater than 5 cm (2.0 in) in length, or the pedicel is not erect, then it is not Trillium undulatum.

Trillium undulatum
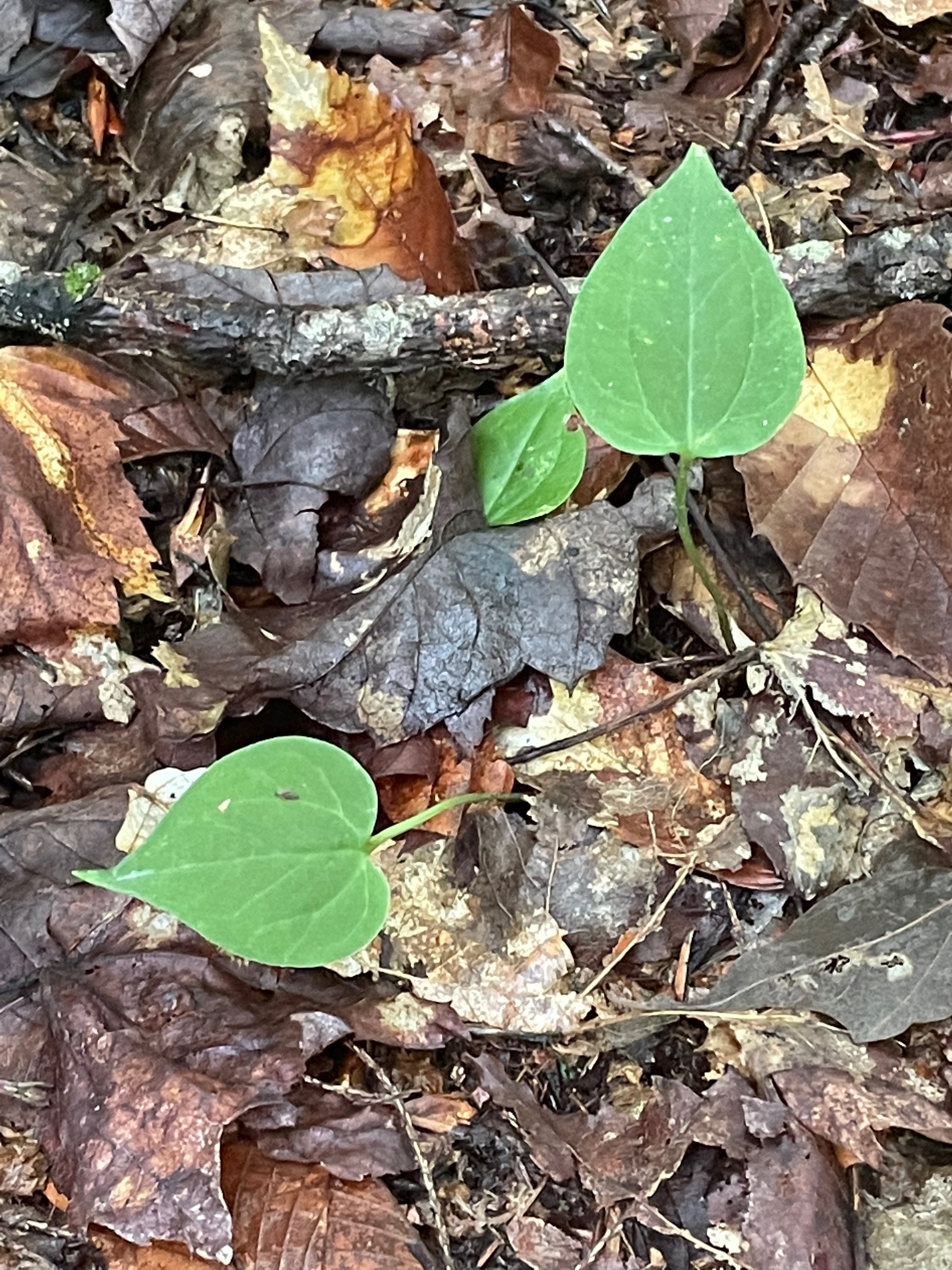
One-leaf seedlings in Vermont (20 August)

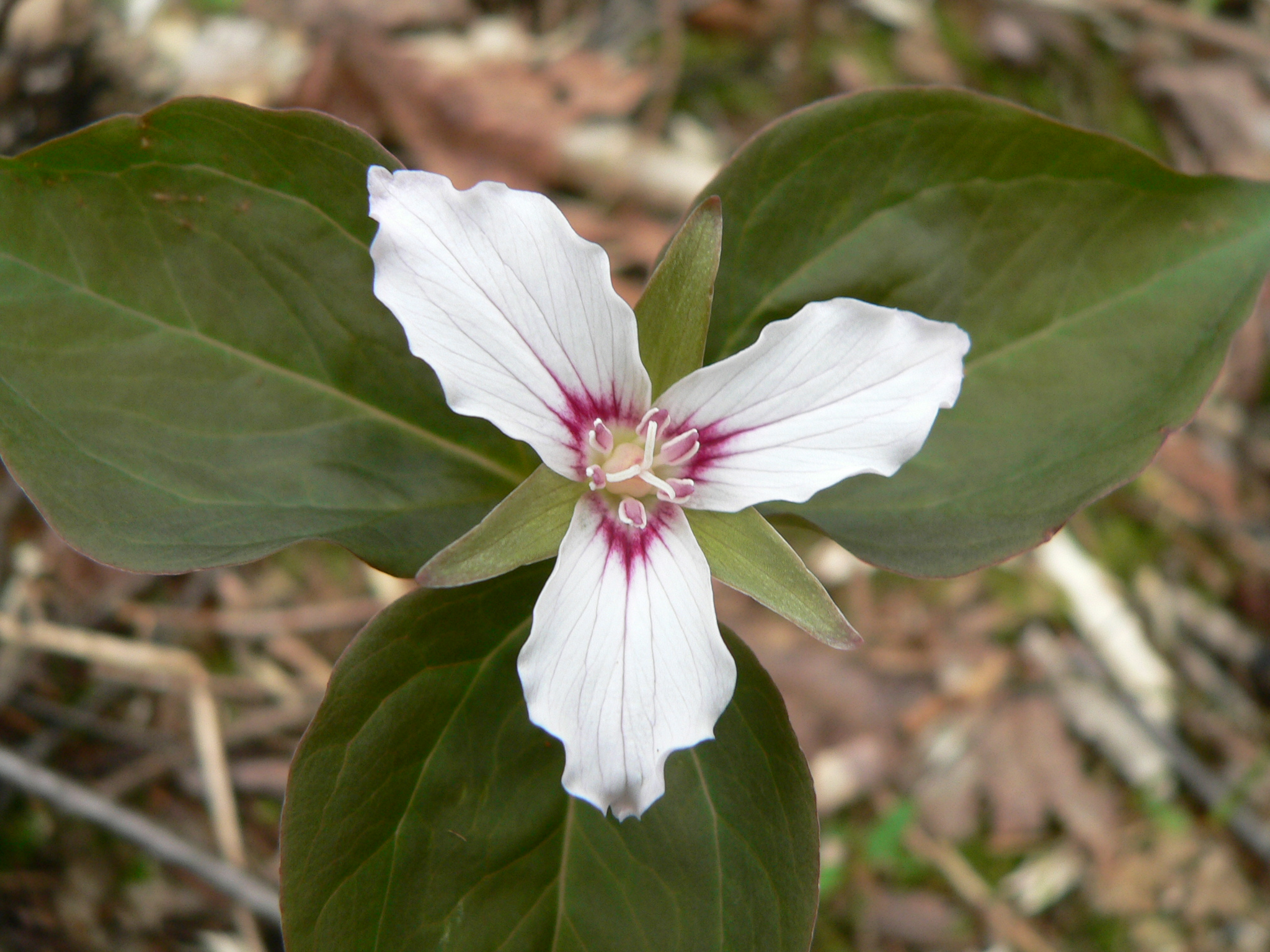
With flower in Quebec (20 May)

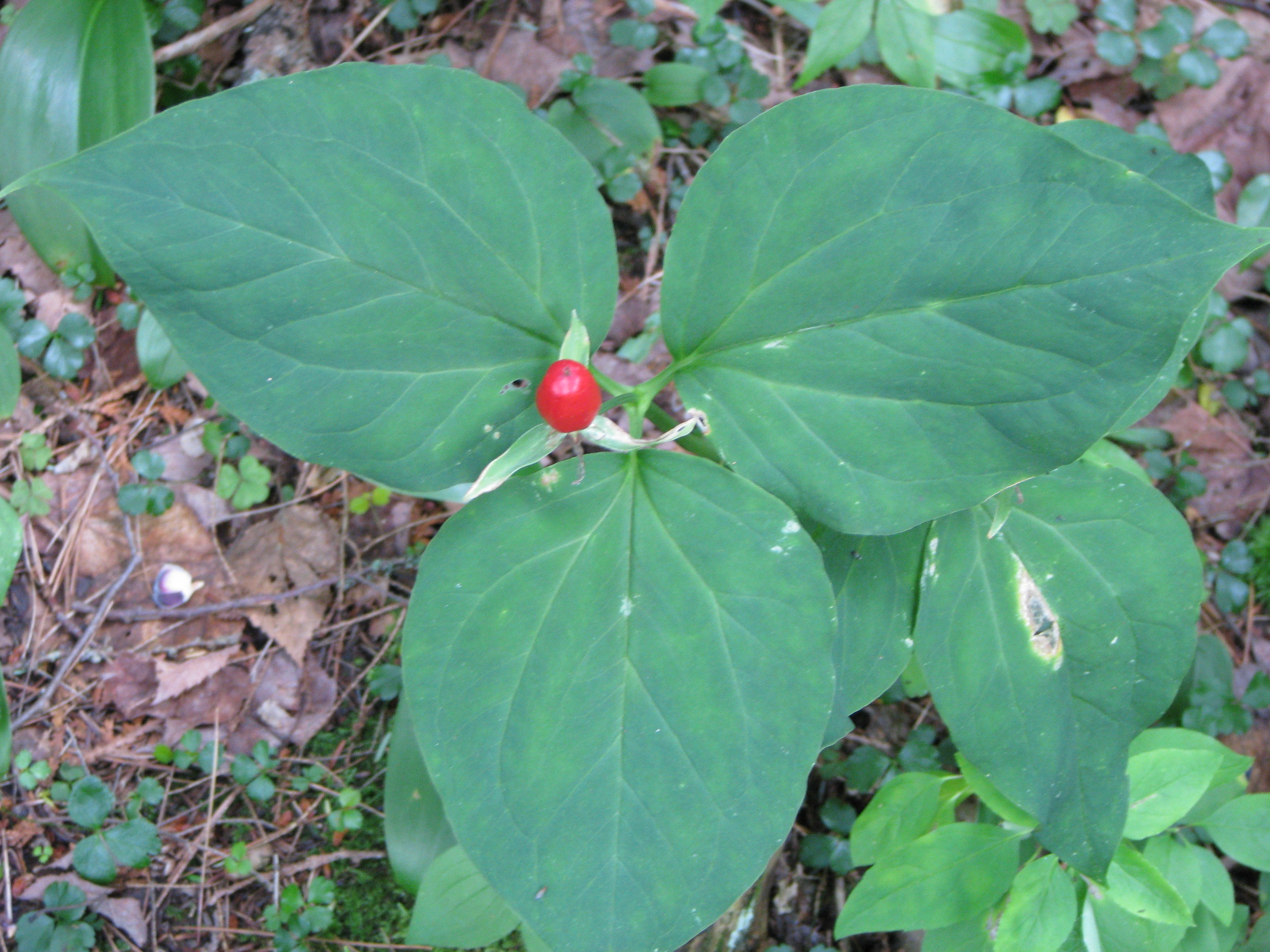
With fruit in New York (10 August)

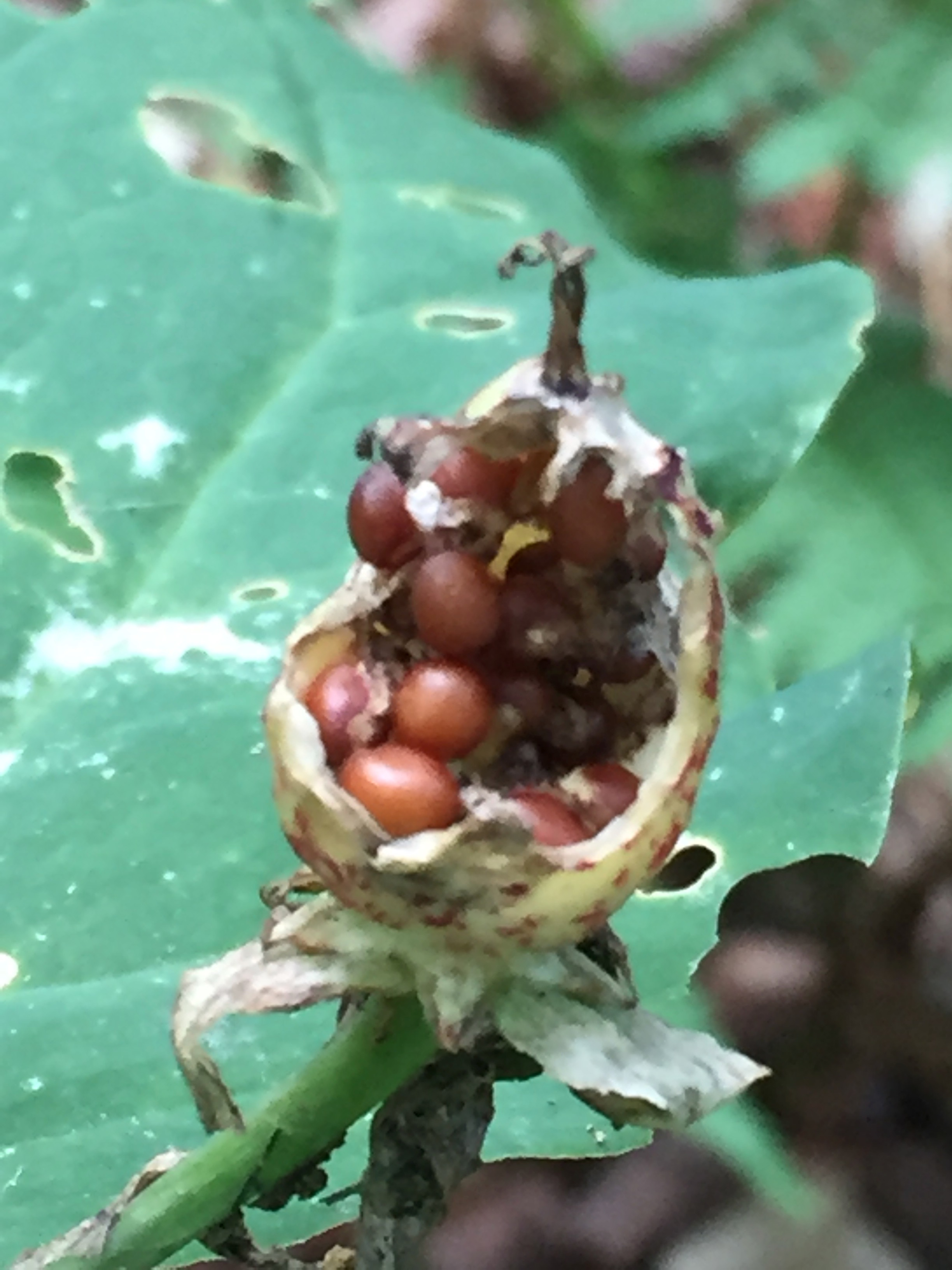
Seed dispersal in Vermont (6 August)

In general, the early life history of a Trillium species includes a one-leaf vegetative stage. A plant in this stage is recognized by the color, texture, and venation of the single leaf compared to the three leaves of a mature plant of the corresponding species. Populations of T. undulatum often have a large number of seedlings with a single leaf since individuals remain in the one-leaf stage for relatively long periods of time.

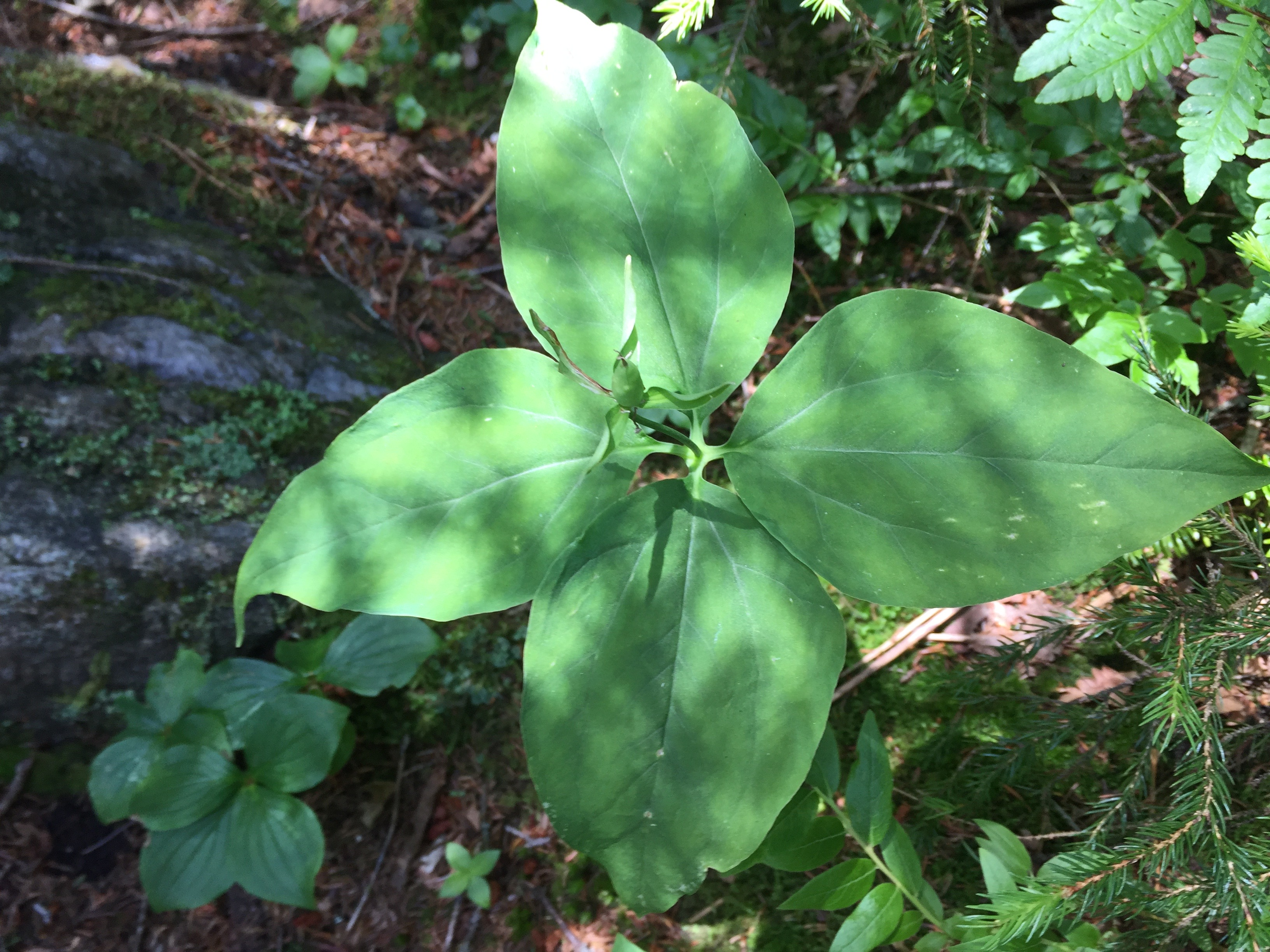
Trillium undulatum with four leaves and four sepals

== Taxonomy ==
Trillium undulatum was first described and named by Carl Ludwig Willdenow in 1801. A proposal to segregate T. undulatum (along with T. govanianum) into genus Trillidium Kunth was put forward in 2018. The proposed grouping is based on phylogenetic analyses, pollen studies, and to a lesser extent, morphology.

As of October 2021, Plants of the World Online (POWO) lists 8 synonyms for Trillium undulatum. Although POWO accepts no infraspecific names, numerous forms have been described. In particular, Patrick described Trillium undulatum forma enotatum in 1985. Unlike the typical form, forma enotatum has white petals with no red markings. Populations of this form have been found in the southern Appalachian Mountains of Georgia and North Carolina.

In addition, numerous abnormal forms have been reported, including variants with multiple whorls of bracts, enormous sepals, or four or more parts (instead of the usual three), the latter being somewhat common in T. undulatum.

Geographical distribution of Trillium undulatum in the USA

== Distribution ==
The range of Trillium undulatum extends from Ontario in the north to northern Georgia in the south and from Michigan in the west to Nova Scotia in the east. The species is known to occur in the following provinces and states:

- Canada: New Brunswick, Nova Scotia, Ontario, Prince Edward Island, Quebec
- United States: Connecticut, Georgia, Kentucky, Maine, Maryland, Massachusetts, Michigan, New Hampshire, New Jersey, New York, North Carolina, Ohio, Pennsylvania, Rhode Island, South Carolina, Tennessee, Vermont, Virginia, West Virginia

T. undulatum demands strongly acidic, humus-rich soils and tends to be found in the shade of acid-loving trees such as eastern white pine, red maple, red spruce and balsam fir. Although the soils that support it have low base saturation, this species was found to have relatively high levels of calcium, magnesium, and especially potassium in its foliage.

As of October 2019, Trillium undulatum is globally secure. It is vulnerable (or worse) in at least seven U.S. states. In particular, it is endangered in both Ohio and Michigan.

== Bibliography ==
- Case, Frederick W. [in Spanish]; Case, Roberta B. (1997). Trilliums. Portland, Oregon: Timber Press. pp. 149–153. ISBN 978-0-88192-374-2.
- Weakley, Alan S. (2020). "Flora of the southeastern United States". University of North Carolina Herbarium, North Carolina Botanical Garden. pp. 201, 202, 203.
