= Algonquin Provincial Park =

Provincial park in Ontario, Canada

- IUCN category II (national park)
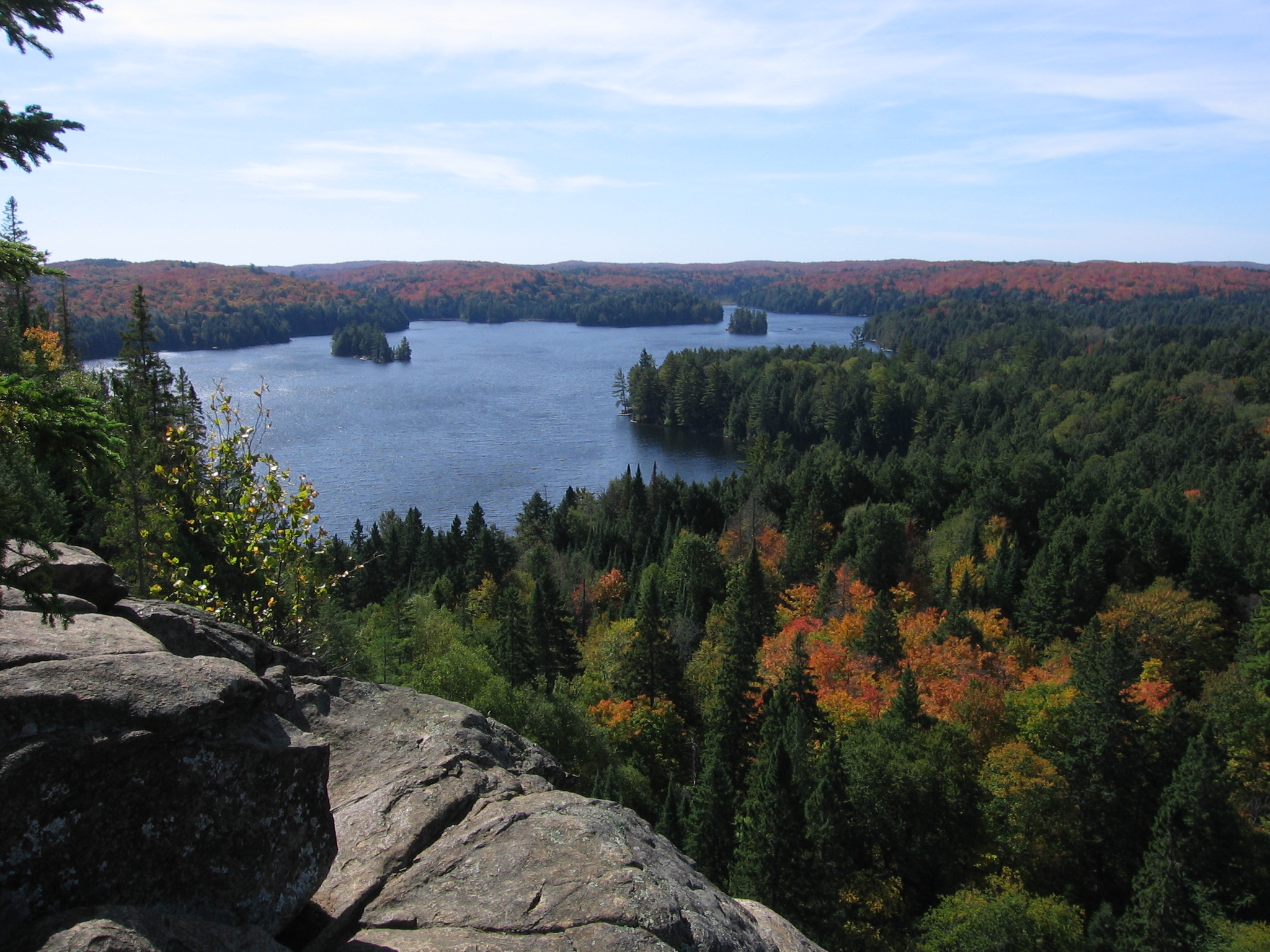
- Overlooking Cache Lake from the Track and Tower hiking trail

- Location within Ontario
- Interactive map of Algonquin Provincial Park
- Location: Central Ontario, Canada
- Nearest town: Dwight (West Gate); Whitney (East Gate)
- Coordinates: 45°35′03″N 78°21′30″W
- Area: 7,723 km^{2} (2,982 sq mi)
- Established: May 23, 1893; 133 years ago
- Visitors: 1,056,821 (in 2022)
- Operator: Ontario Parks
- Website: ontarioparks.com/park/algonquin

National Historic Site of Canada
- Official name: Algonquin Provincial Park National Historic Site of Canada
- Designated: June 1992

Algonquin Provincial Park is an Ontario provincial park located between Georgian Bay and the Ottawa River, mostly within the Unorganized South Part of Nipissing District. Established in 1893, it is the oldest provincial park in Canada. Additions since its creation have increased the park to its current size of about 7,653 square kilometres (2,955 sq mi). The park is contiguous with several smaller, administratively separate provincial parks that protect important rivers in the area, resulting in a larger total protected area.

Its size, combined with its proximity to the major urban centres of Toronto and Ottawa, makes Algonquin one of the most popular provincial parks in the province and the country. Highway 60 runs through the south end of the park, while the Trans-Canada Highway bypasses it to the north. Over 2,400 lakes and 1,200 kilometres of streams and rivers are located within the park. Some notable examples include Canoe Lake and the Petawawa, Nipissing, Amable du Fond, Madawaska, and Tim rivers. These were formed by the retreat of the glaciers during the last ice age.

The park is considered part of the "border" between Northern Ontario and Southern Ontario. The park is in an area of transition between northern coniferous forest and southern deciduous forest. This unique mixture of forest types, and the wide variety of environments in the park, allows the park to support an uncommon diversity of plant and animal species. It is also an important site for wildlife research.

Algonquin Park was named a National Historic Site in 1992 in recognition of several heritage values including: its role in the development of park management; pioneering visitor interpretation programs later adopted by national and provincial parks across the country; its role in inspiring artists, which in turn gave Canadians a greater sense of their country; and historic structures such as lodges, hotels, cottages, camps, entrance gates (the West Gate was designed by George H. Williams, Chief Architect and Deputy Minister of Public Works for the Province of Ontario), a railway station, and administration and museum buildings.

Algonquin Park is the only designated park within the province of Ontario to allow industrial logging to take place within its borders.

== History ==
=== Early logging ===
In the 19th century, the logging industry cut the large white pine and red pine trees to produce lumber for domestic and American markets, as well as square timber for export to Great Britain. The loggers were followed by small numbers of homesteaders and farmers. Even at that time, however, the area's beauty was recognized by nature preservationists.

To manage these conflicting interests, the Ontario Government appointed a commission to inquire into and report on the matter. The act to establish Algonquin Park was drawn up in 1892 by this five member Royal Commission, made up of Alexander Kirkwood (the chairman and Commissioner of Crown Lands), James Dickson (Ontario Land Surveyor), Archibald Blue (director of mines), Robert Phipps (head of the Forestry Branch), and Aubrey White (Assistant Commissioner of Crown Lands). Their report recommended the establishment of a park in the territory lying near and enclosing the headwaters of five major rivers, those being: the Muskoka, Little Madawaska River (including Opeongo), Amable du Fond River, Petawawa River, and South rivers.

The commissioners remarked in their report: "the experience of older countries had everywhere shown that the wholesale and indiscriminate slaughter of forests brings a host of evils in its train. Wide tracts are converted from fertile plains into arid desert, springs and streams are dried up, and the rainfall, instead of percolating gently through the forest floor and finding its way by easy stages by brook and river to the lower levels, now descends the valley in hurrying torrents, carrying before it tempestuous floods."

- Report of the (Ontario) Royal Commission on Forest Conservation and National Park, Mar. 8, 1893

Although much of the area within Algonquin had been under license for some time, it was intended to make the park an example of good forestry practices. Only licenses to cut pine would be issued. The commissioners had recommended that when the hardwood was mature, it too should be cut.

==== Dark Day fire ====
Researchers believe that smoke from a forest fire in Algonquin Park was responsible for New England's Dark Day of May 19, 1780. This is based on investigations into scar marks which are left in the growth rings of trees that survive forest fires. Data obtained from such scar marks make it possible to approximate the date of a past fire.

=== Current logging ===
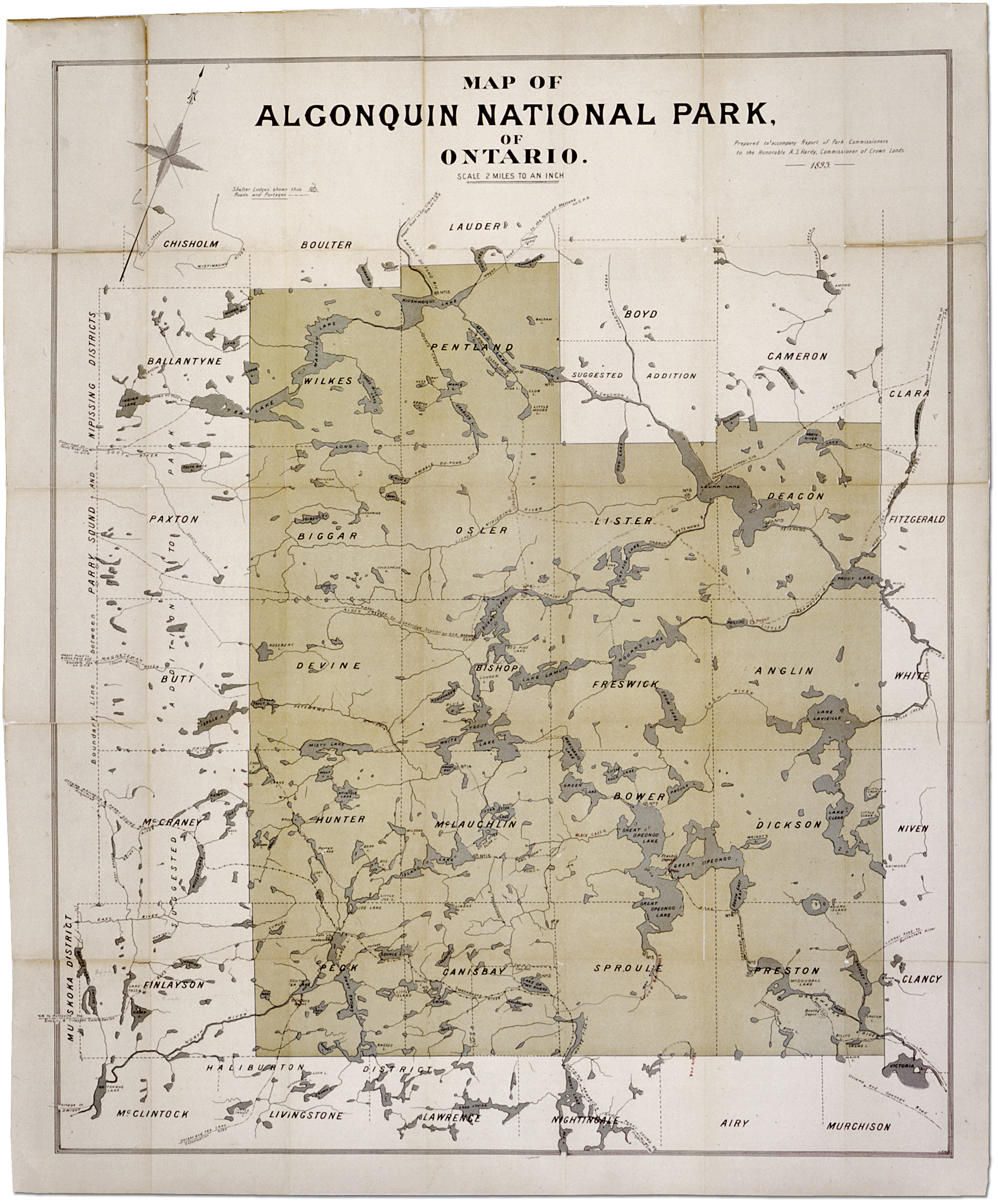
1893 Survey of Park Lands

Industrial logging continues in significant portions of the park's interior. After 2013 amendments to the park management plan, 65.3% of the park (498,785 hectares) remains in the recreation/utilization zone where logging is permitted. Numerous methods of logging take place throughout the park including clear cutting, selection cutting and shelterwood cutting.

As of 2009, the Algonquin Forestry Authority is currently reviewing an application that would allow for expansion of current logging roads and the addition of new ones.

Forestry activities in Algonquin, including logging are carried out in accordance with a Forest Management Plan prepared according to Ontario Ministry of Natural Resources and Forestry requirements. The planning process includes public consultation opportunities at several stages of preparation. The 2010–2020 approved Forest Management Plan for the Algonquin Park Forest, the 2015–2020 Phase 2 Plan, and the associated Annual Work Schedules and Reports are available on the Ministry of Natural Resources and Forestry's website.

=== Park formation ===
An Act to establish "Algonquin National Park of Ontario" was passed by the Liberal government of Oliver Mowat in the Ontario Legislature, May 23, 1893 (56 Vic., c.8). The name "Algonquin" refers to the Algonquin people, indigenous inhabitants of the area.

Although called a "national park", Algonquin has always been under the jurisdiction of the provincial government. No provincial parks existed until Algonquin, but there was a new movement to create national parks since Banff's establishment in 1885. The name was changed to Algonquin Provincial Park in 1913.

- Notice regarding establishment of 'The Algonquin National Park of Ontario', Sept. 27, 1893, transcribed on Death On a Painted Lake: The Death of Tom Thomson
- Archibald M. Campbell, "The Algonquin National Park of Ontario-Its Resources and Advantages", The Ottawa Naturalist XV (June, 1901): 80-89, transcribed on Death On a Painted Lake: The Death of Tom Thomson

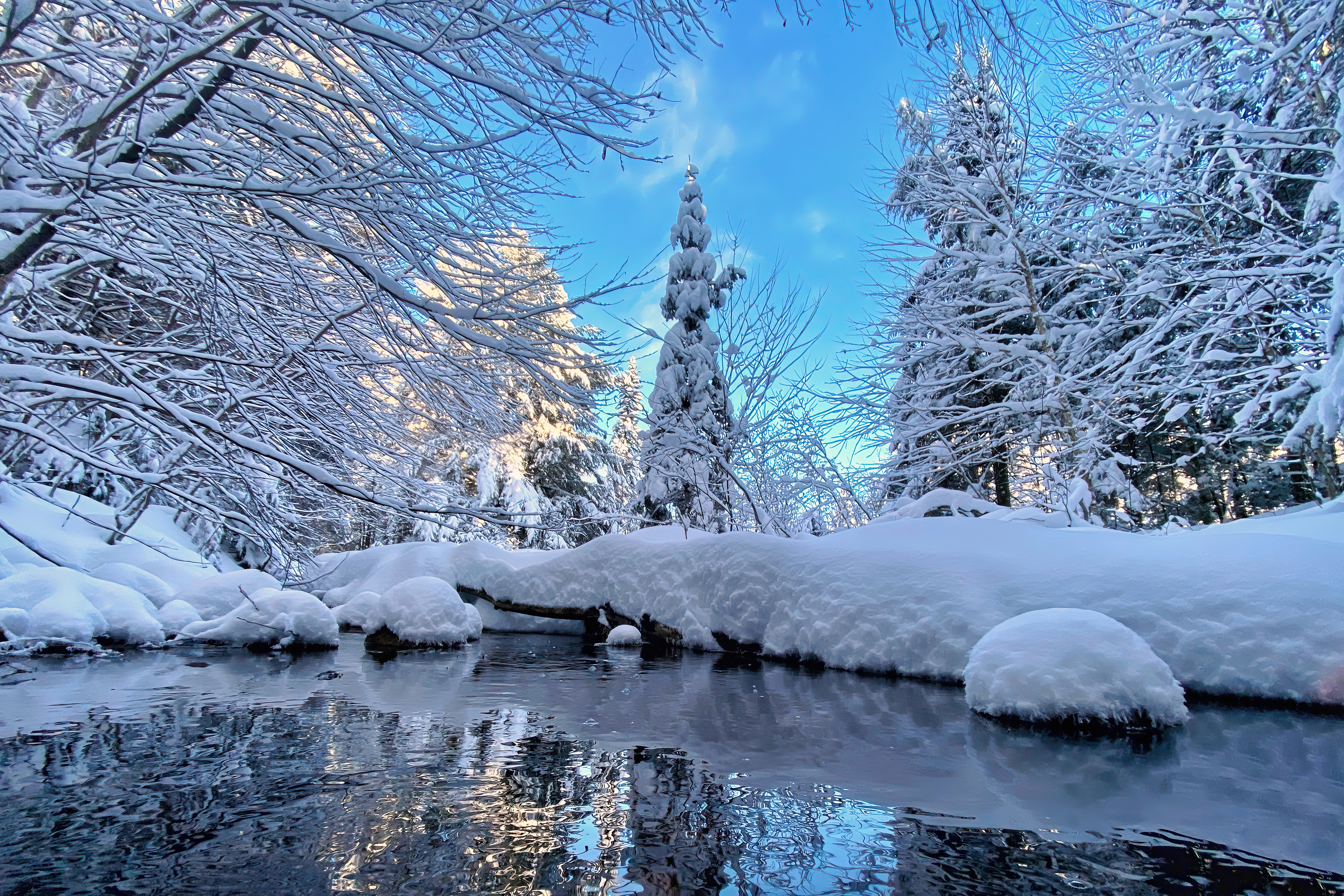
Winter scene in Algonquin Park

The boundaries of the park included 18 townships within the District of Nipissing, covering an area of 3,797 square kilometres (1,466 sq mi) of which 10% was under water. The tract of land was to be set apart, as a public park, health resort and pleasure ground for the benefit, advantage and enjoyment of all the people of the province. The year following the park's creation saw portions of six new townships added to the existing park's boundaries (Paxton, McCraney, Finlayson, Butt, Ballantyne, and Boyd). The first four were put up for auction that same year. The production of the lumber companies operating in the park at the time increased from 680,000 m^{3} (288 million board feet) in 1886 to 809,000 m^{3} (343 million board feet) in 1896.

Peter Thomson, the first chief ranger of Algonquin Park, was responsible for establishing park boundaries, constructing buildings, and posting notices to warn hunters and trappers against trespassing. He liaised with timber operators, oversaw the removal of settlers and their homes, and notified local Algonquin natives that they could no longer hunt, trap or live in the area.

Park rangers began patrolling the park, the game protected, and forest fires were suppressed. By 1910 wildlife numbers were increasing. Thousands of people had visited the great pleasure resort and it was said to be undeniably one of the most beautiful natural parks in the Dominion, if not on this continent. All this had entailed a large expenditure by the government, which was recovered chiefly through the maintenance of timber licenses. There was no fee for camping permits, though a nominal charge was introduced for fishing and guides' licenses when "an Act to establish the Algonquin National Park of Ontario" was again passed by the legislature, March 19, 1910. This new legislation included the original area as well as portions of ten townships annexed into the park since 1893, and allowed for further expansion by the addition of adjacent townships, should it become necessary.

Another notable figure in park management was Frank MacDougall, the park's chief ranger from 1931 to 1941. He was the first ranger to supervise the park by airplane, flying a Fairchild KR-34. He eventually became deputy minister for the provincial Ministry of Lands and Forests, and the portion of Highway 60 which passes through Algonquin Park has been named the Frank A. MacDougall Parkway in his honour.

=== Railway, settlement, and the beginning of tourism ===
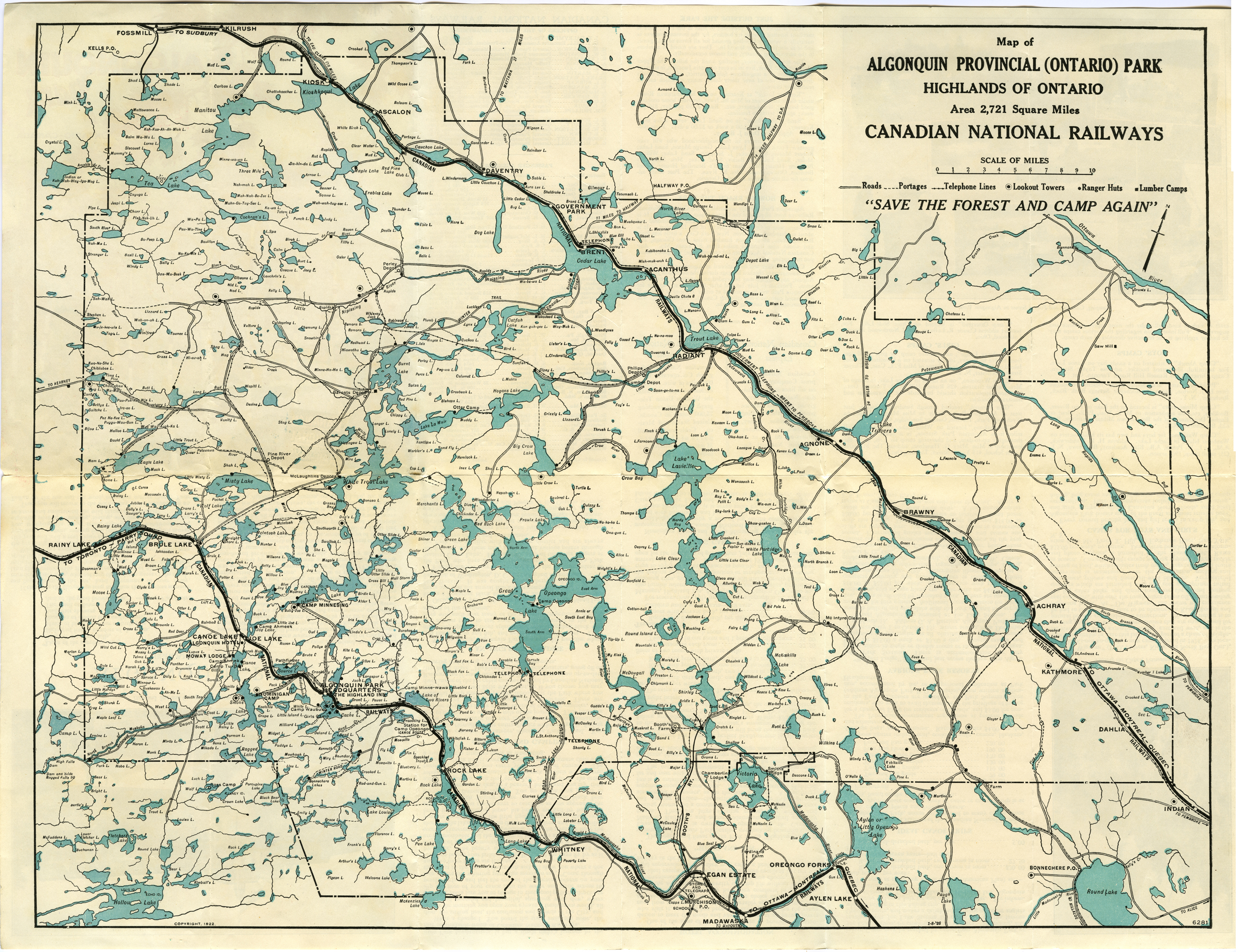
Map of CN Railways lines in the park from 1922

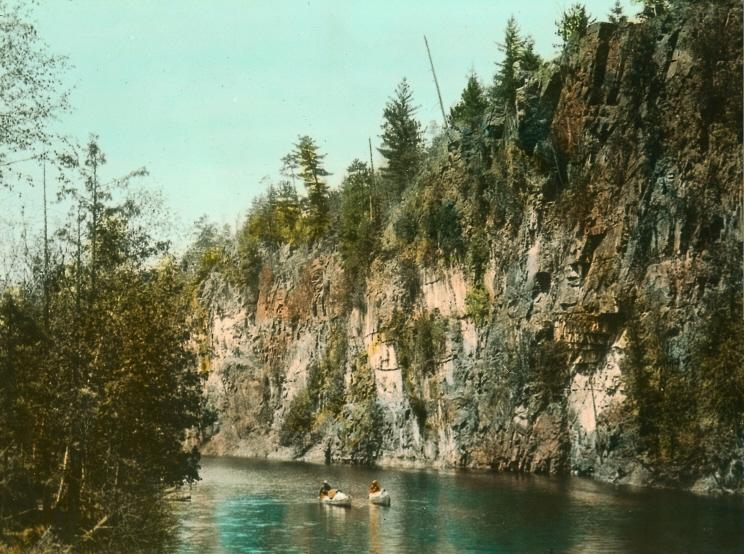
A hand-coloured photograph of canoeists in Algonquin Park in the 1920s

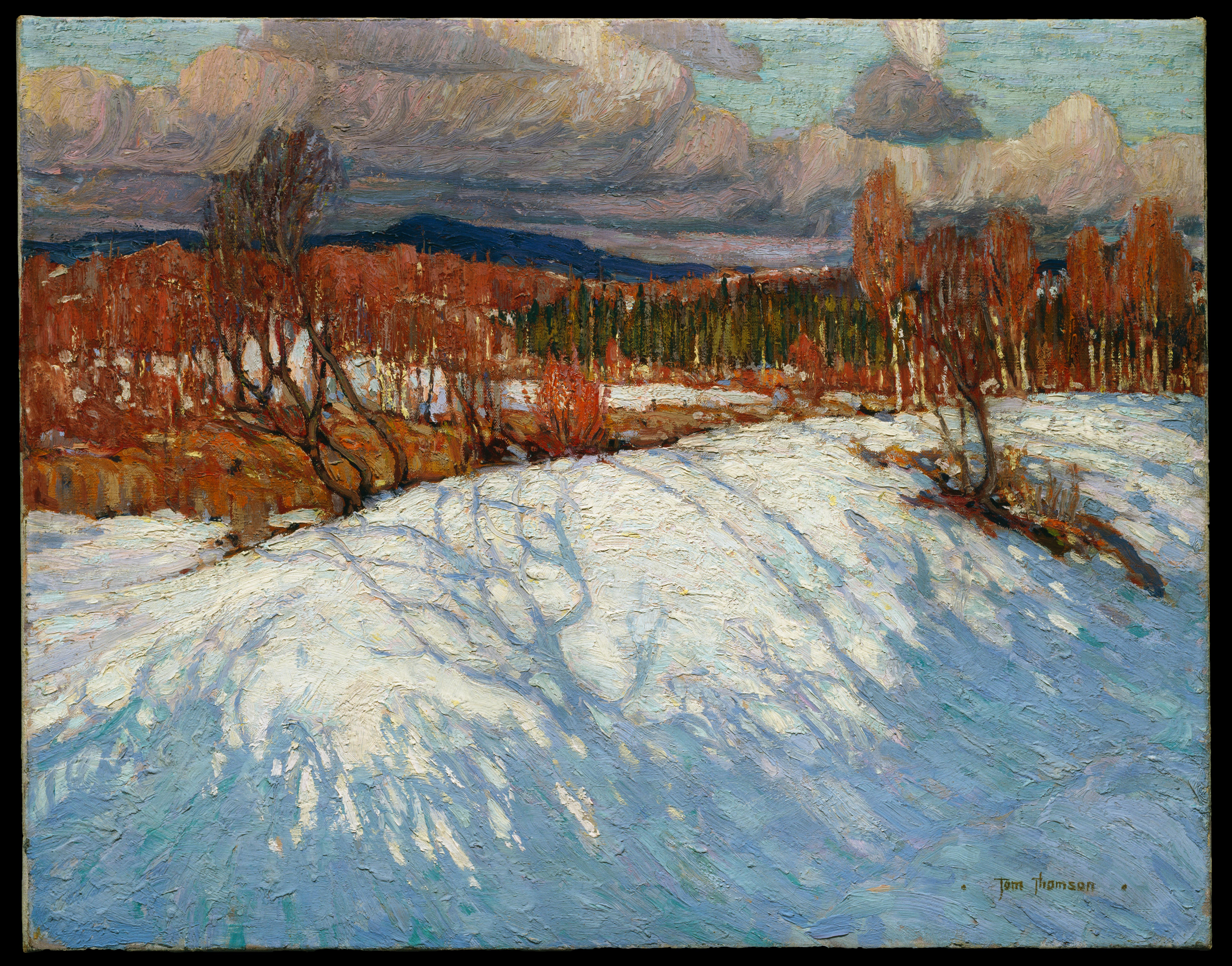
Tom Thomson, In Algonquin Park, Winter 1914–1915. McMichael Canadian Art Collection, Kleinburg

Construction of the Ottawa, Arnprior and Parry Sound Railway (O. A. & P. S.) through the park in 1896 provided the first easy access to the area. While the park's purpose was to control settlement within its boundaries, the families of railway workers as well as those of the lumbermen took up residence in the park. The village of Mowat on the west side of Canoe Lake was first established in 1893 as a logging camp for the Gilmour Lumber Company. From there, logs were driven down the Oxtongue River towards Lake of Bays and eventually on to Trenton. In the same year the park headquarters was established near the logging camp. The arrival of the railway had provided easy access for the lumbermen as well. The Gilmour firm decided to put up a sawmill closer to their source of timber. By 1897 the village of Mowat had grown to 500 residents and there were 18 kilometres (11 mi) of railway siding.

The same year saw the official opening of the railway between Ottawa and Depot Harbour. Park headquarters were also relocated in 1897 from Mowat to a point of land on the north shore of Cache Lake, adjacent to the railway. The O. A. & P. S. put up a station there it named Algonquin Park. The railway, taken over by the Canada Atlantic Railway in 1899, was in turn sold to the Grand Trunk Railway (GTR) in 1905.

In 1898 George W. Bartlett was appointed as the second superintendent of Algonquin Park, replacing the late Peter Thompson. Placed under the direction of the Premier of Ontario to make the park self-sufficient, Bartlett worked to make the park more attractive to tourists by encouraging short-term leases for cottages, lodges, and camps. Changes came about in 1908, when Hotel Algonquin was opened at Joe Lake. The Grand Trunk Railway opened its first hotel, the Highland Inn, near Park Headquarters. Built on a hill behind Algonquin Park station, the two-storey year-round resort was an immediate success. Soon other guest lodges were established in the park. To the west side of Highland Inn, land was cleared and raised wooden platforms erected, on which tents (supplied by the hotel), were put up to meet the requirements of the rapidly growing tourist trade.

At the village of Mowat, abandoned by Gilmour Lumber Co. in 1900, the mill's former boarding house became Mowat Lodge in 1913. The Highland Inn was enlarged, and new camps were built. Nominigan Camp, consisting of a main lodge with six cabins of log construction, was established on Smoke Lake. Camp Minnesing on Burnt Island Lake was created as a wilderness lodge. Both, open only in July and August, were built by the GTR as affiliates of the Highland Inn.

A second railway, the Canadian Northern (CNoR), was built across the northern portion of the park, opening in 1915. Both lines later became part of Canadian National Railway. The beginning of the end of rail service in the park happened in 1933 when a flood damaged an old Ottawa, Arnprior and Parry Sound Railway trestle on Cache Lake. The trestle was deemed too dangerous to use and too expensive to fix, ending through service on the southern line (old O.A. & P.S.). Service from the west ended in 1952, and from the east in 1959. Service on the old CNoR line through the north end of the park ended in 1995. Many of the trails in the park still make use of portions of the old railway rights-of-way.

=== Administration and management ===
As recreational use of the park increased during the 1950s and 1960s, it became clear that a long-term plan to manage the park was required. Six years of consultation with park users resulted in the 1974 publication of the Algonquin Master Plan, a management plan that sought to ensure that the park could continue indefinitely to serve all of the competing park interests. Three major changes came about as a result of the plan. One, the park was divided into zones with different specified purposes and uses: Nature Reserve and Historic (5.7% of land area), Wilderness (12%), Development (4.3%) and Recreation-Utilization (78%) zones. Logging in the park was limited to the Recreation-Utilization zones, but was separated as much as possible from users of the park interior in order to maintain the park's natural environment. Each year only a small percentage of the park is being actively logged. Two, all existing timber licenses were cancelled, and all logging in the park is now done by the Algonquin Forestry Authority, which supplies timber to 10 private mills outside the park. Three, rules were put in place to limit the impact of recreational use of the park. Almost all cans and bottles are banned in the interior, and limits are placed on the number of people per campsite, and the number of people who can enter the park interior per day at each access point. Also, the use of boat motors is limited, both in power and to a few of the larger and more accessible lakes. The master plan has been reviewed and updated four times since 1974, with the latest version being published in 1999.

== Climate ==
The park has a humid continental climate (Köppen Climate Classification Dfb) with long, cold, snowy winters and warm summers. In winter, temperatures frequently drop below −20 °C (−4.0 °F) while in summer, temperatures can exceed 30 °C (86.0 °F) 9 days per year. Precipitation averages 810 millimetres (32 in) per year, which is fairly evenly distributed throughout the year with late summer/early fall being the wettest months and the winter months being the driest.

Climate data for Algonquin Provincial Park (Lake Traverse)
Month	Jan	Feb	Mar	Apr	May	Jun	Jul	Aug	Sep	Oct	Nov	Dec	Year
Record high °C (°F)	11.1 (52.0)	12.0 (53.6)	23.3 (73.9)	30.0 (86.0)	33.9 (93.0)	33.9 (93.0)	37.2 (99.0)	36.7 (98.1)	32.2 (90.0)	28.3 (82.9)	20.6 (69.1)	17.0 (62.6)	37.2 (99.0)
Mean daily maximum °C (°F)	−7.2 (19.0)	−4.6 (23.7)	1.9 (35.4)	10.1 (50.2)	18.7 (65.7)	23.0 (73.4)	25.7 (78.3)	24.0 (75.2)	18.6 (65.5)	11.9 (53.4)	3.5 (38.3)	−4.0 (24.8)	10.1 (50.2)
Daily mean °C (°F)	−13.2 (8.2)	−11.3 (11.7)	−4.3 (24.3)	3.6 (38.5)	11.4 (52.5)	15.9 (60.6)	18.8 (65.8)	17.4 (63.3)	12.6 (54.7)	6.4 (43.5)	−0.6 (30.9)	−9.2 (15.4)	4.0 (39.2)
Mean daily minimum °C (°F)	−19.2 (−2.6)	−18.1 (−0.6)	−10.5 (13.1)	−2.8 (27.0)	4.2 (39.6)	8.8 (47.8)	11.8 (53.2)	10.8 (51.4)	6.5 (43.7)	0.8 (33.4)	−4.6 (23.7)	−14.3 (6.3)	−2.2 (28.0)
Record low °C (°F)	−42.0 (−43.6)	−40.5 (−40.9)	−35.5 (−31.9)	−18.3 (−0.9)	−10.6 (12.9)	−3.9 (25.0)	−0.6 (30.9)	−2.0 (28.4)	−6.0 (21.2)	−12.2 (10.0)	−26.1 (−15.0)	−39.4 (−38.9)	−42.0 (−43.6)
Average precipitation mm (inches)	55.2 (2.17)	47.2 (1.86)	54.1 (2.13)	60.1 (2.37)	71.0 (2.80)	79.1 (3.11)	76.3 (3.00)	77.1 (3.04)	84.2 (3.31)	67.2 (2.65)	67.9 (2.67)	70.7 (2.78)	810.3 (31.90)
Average rainfall mm (inches)	5.9 (0.23)	8.4 (0.33)	23.2 (0.91)	49.7 (1.96)	70.3 (2.77)	79.1 (3.11)	76.3 (3.00)	77.1 (3.04)	84.2 (3.31)	65.9 (2.59)	38.0 (1.50)	10.7 (0.42)	588.8 (23.18)
Average snowfall cm (inches)	49.3 (19.4)	38.9 (15.3)	30.9 (12.2)	10.4 (4.1)	0.7 (0.3)	0 (0)	0 (0)	0 (0)	0 (0)	1.3 (0.5)	30.0 (11.8)	60.1 (23.7)	221.5 (87.2)
Average precipitation days (≥ 0.2 mm)	14.8	10.3	11.6	10.7	11.4	12.7	12.3	14.2	15.1	14.3	13.4	14.7	155.4
Average rainy days (≥ 0.2 mm)	0.88	1.6	4.3	8.6	11.4	12.7	12.3	14.2	15.1	13.8	7.8	2.1	104.7
Average snowy days (≥ 0.2 cm)	14.1	9.1	7.8	2.6	0.31	0	0	0	0.06	0.69	6.8	13.1	54.6
Source: Environment Canada

== Legacy of landscapes ==
As a result of its beauty, Algonquin Park became recognized by nature preservationists. It quickly became popular with anglers, though hunting was prohibited.

The landscapes of Algonquin Park attracted artists such as Tom Thomson along with members of the Group of Seven. Thomson served as a guide in the park, often working from Mowat Lodge. He did much of his painting at Canoe Lake, and a favourite campsite of his was behind Hayhurst Point, a peninsula overlooking the central portion of the lake. Many of Thomson's most significant paintings are of Algonquin Park, including The Jack Pine and The West Wind. He died under mysterious circumstances at Canoe Lake in 1917. A plaque recognizing his national historic significance stands at the Visitor Centre dock on Canoe Lake, erected by the Historic Sites and Monuments Board of Canada. Friends of the painter erected a cairn and totem pole memorial on Hayhurst Point, near the north end of the lake.

== Visitor activities ==
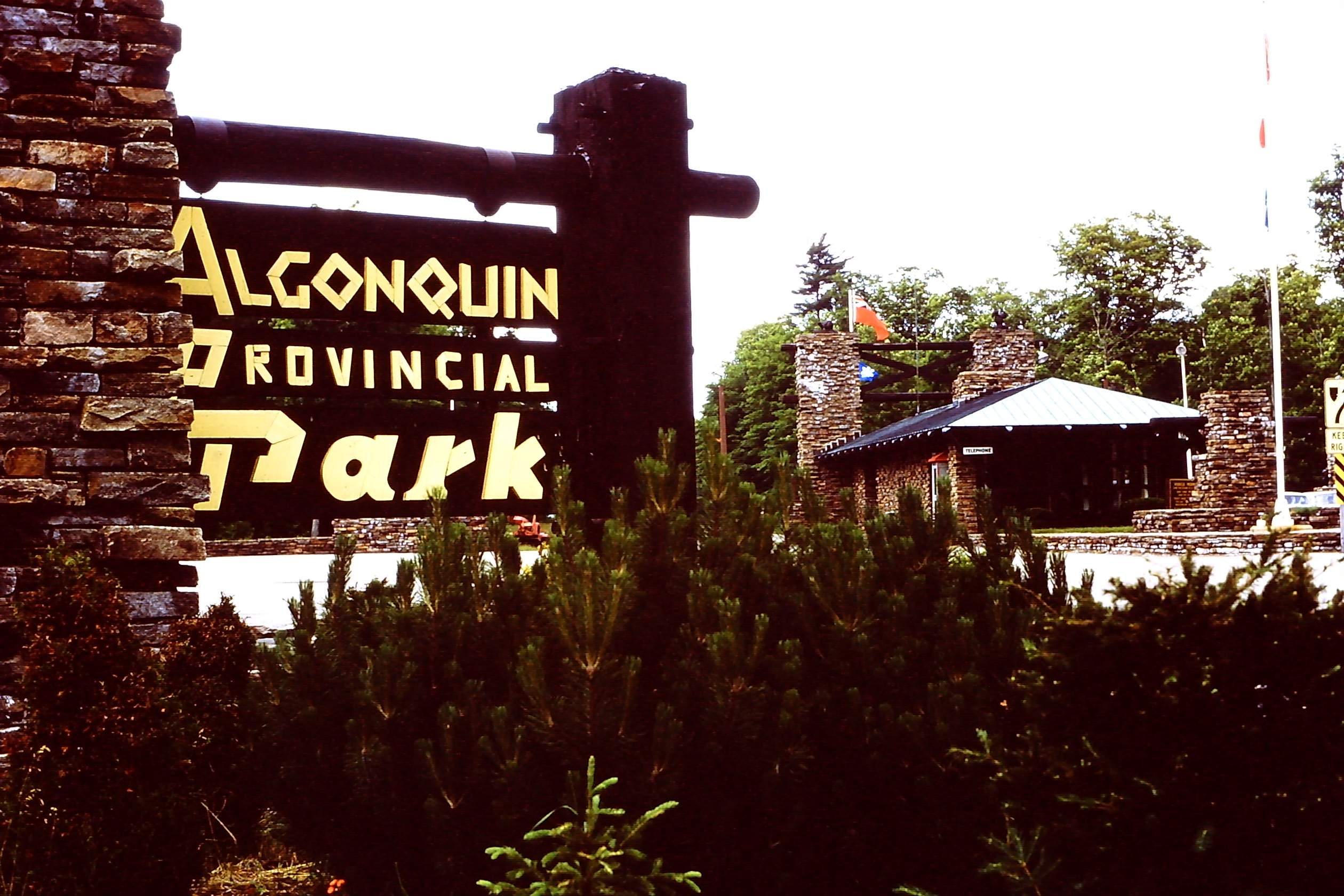
Entrance to Alqonquin Park

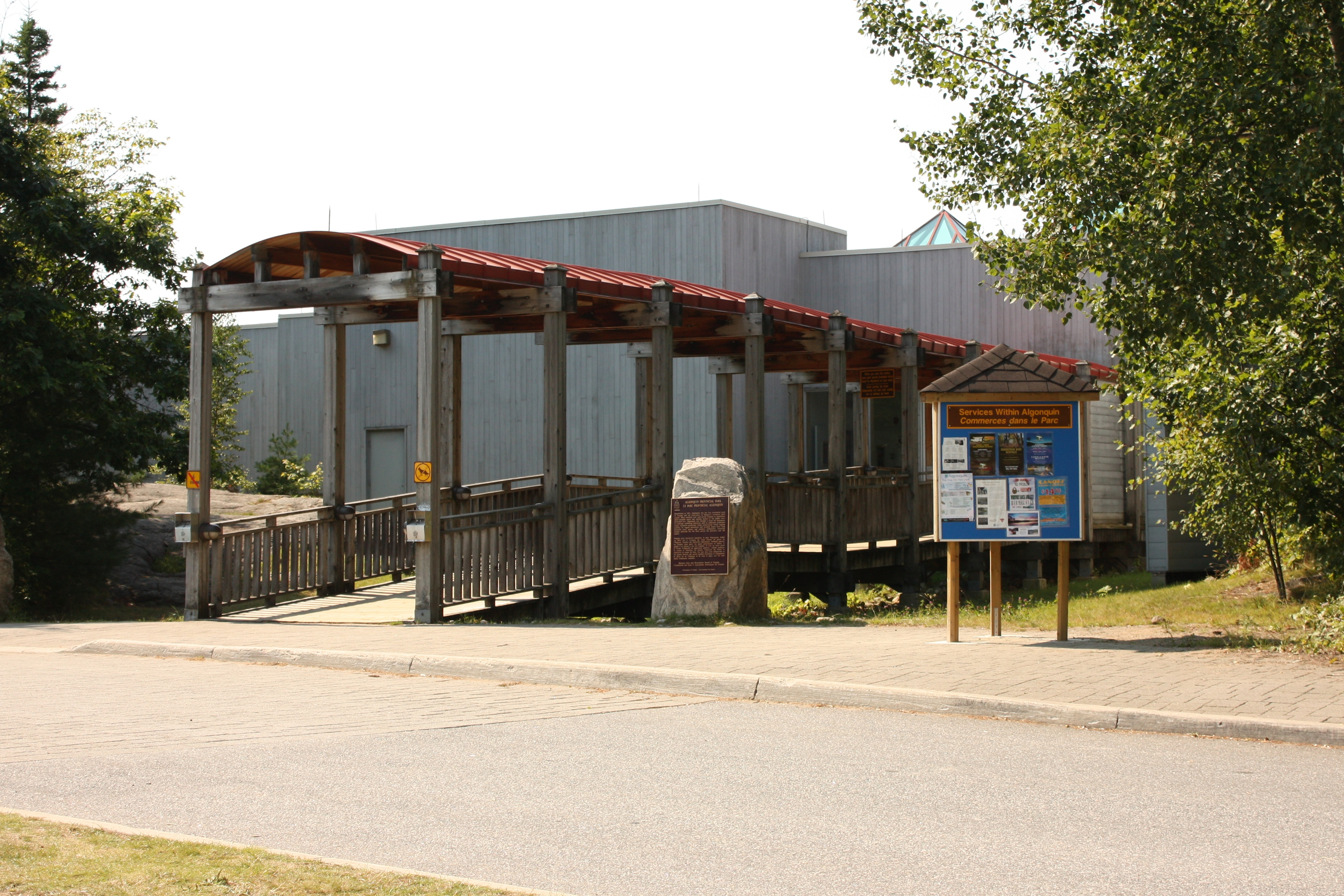
The Algonquin Visitor Centre at km 43 of the Highway 60 corridor

Algonquin is popular for year-round outdoor activities. There are over 1,200 campsites in eight designated campgrounds along Highway 60 in the south end of the park, with almost 100 others in three other campgrounds across the northern and eastern edges. There is also the Whitefish Lake group campground with 18 sites of various sizes to accommodate groups of 20, 30, or 40 people. Interior Camping is possible further inside the park at sites accessible only by canoe or on foot.

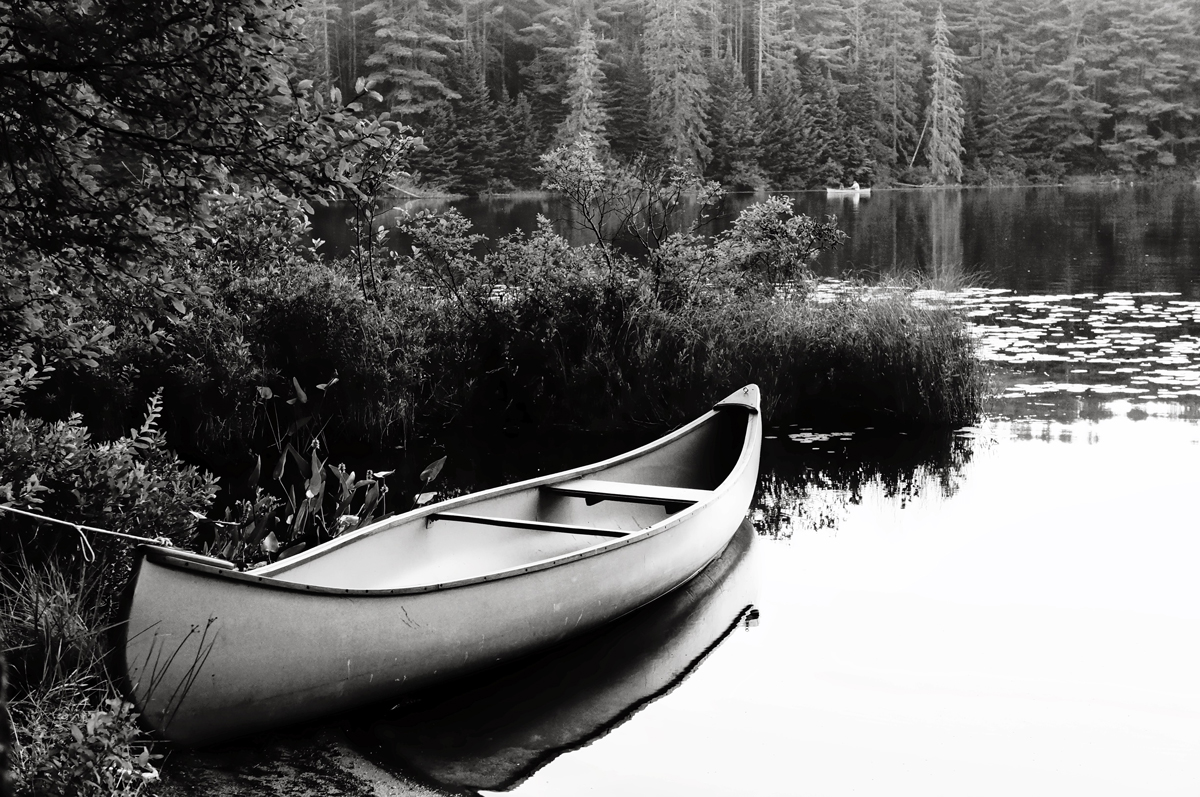
Docked canoe on Pog Lake, Algonquin Park

The Algonquin Visitor Centre features exhibits about the natural and cultural history of the park. A large and detailed relief map of southern Ontario is displayed to enable a visitor to be oriented to the size and geography of the park. In a flow-through style, exhibits continue with many taxidermied species set in their native surroundings, then progresses, in a chronological manner, through an extensive collection of artifacts relating to human intervention in the park. The centre also includes a video theatre, a gift shop, a panoramic outdoor viewing deck, and an art gallery—"The Algonquin Room"—with changing exhibits of art related to the park.

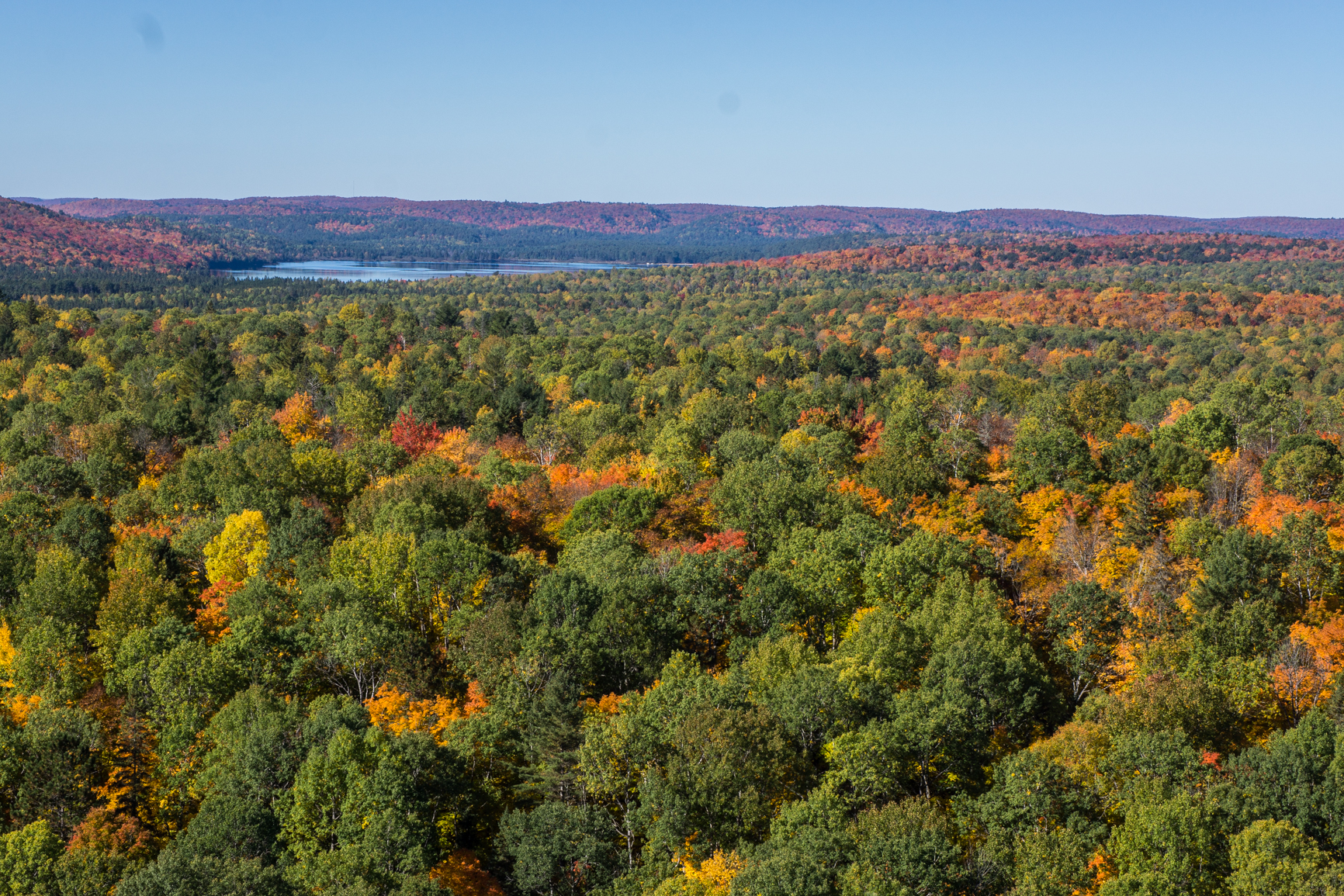
Lookout trail

Other activities include fishing, mountain biking, horseback riding, cross country skiing, and day hiking. The park has 19 interpretive trails, ranging in length from 1 to 11.7 kilometres (0.62 to 7.27 mi). Each trail comes with a trail guide and is meant to introduce visitors to a different aspect of the park's ecology or history.

Algonquin is home to a Natural Heritage Education program. The most popular aspect of the program are the weekly wolf howls. These are held (weather and wolves permitting) on Thursdays in the month of August, and sometimes in the first week of September if there is a Thursday before Labour Day. Park staff attempt to locate a wolf pack on Wednesday evening and, if successful, they announce a public wolf howl the next day.

The park also publishes a visitor's newsletter, The Raven, six times a year – two issues in spring, two in summer, one in the fall, and one in the winter.

=== Algonquin Logging Museum ===
Opened in 1992, the Algonquin Logging Museum is located by the park's east gate. A 1.3-kilometre-long (0.81 mi) trail features a recreated logging camp, a steam-powered amphibious tug called an "alligator", logging equipment and interpretive panels about logging industry activities in the park. Exhibits include a video presentation. The museum is open seasonally.

One annual feature worthy of note at the museum is "Logger's Day", typically held in late July or early August each year. This festivity includes musicians, a logger's old style lunch, activities for children, interpretive actors, and forest industry representatives.

=== Day hiking ===
Algonquin has 19 hiking trails along the 55-kilometre (34 mi) highway 60 corridor. These trails do not have overnight campsites as they are designed to be completed within one day of hiking, with a maximum distance of 11 kilometres (6.8 mi).

Day hiking requires a day use pass per vehicle parked. Each hike explores different aspects of Algonquin, with trail guide booklets available with historical trail information.

- Hardwood Lookout: 1 km (0.62 mi)
- Algonquin Logging Museum: 1.3 km (0.81 mi)
- Barron Canyon: 1.5 km (0.93 mi)
- Spruce Bog Boardwalk: 1.5 km (0.93 mi)
- Beaver Pond: 2 km (1.2 mi)
- Brent Crater 2 km (1.2 mi)
- Lookout: 2.1 km (1.3 mi)
- Whiskey rapids: 2.1 km (1.3 mi)
- Peck Lake: 2.3 km (1.4 mi)
- Two Rivers: 2.3 km (1.4 mi)
- Fork Lake: 2.4 km (1.5 mi)
- Big Pines: 2.9 km (1.8 mi)
- Hemlock Bluff: 3.5 km (2.2 mi)
- Berm Lake: 4.5 km (2.8 mi)
- Booth's Rock: 5.1 km (3.2 mi)
- Bat Lake: 5.8 km (3.6 mi)
- Track & Tower: 7.5 km (4.7 mi)
- Centennial Ridges: 10.4 km (6.5 mi)
- Mizzy Lake: 10.8 km (6.7 mi)

=== Canoe routes ===
Canoe camping is one of the most popular activities. This wilderness experience, essentially, a pristine wilderness canoe journey through vastness of the park, allows the tourist to enjoy the interior of Algonquin Park in ways inaccessible by any other means. The "Friends of Algonquin Park" organization publishes an authoritative map and guide called Canoe Routes of Algonquin Park.

=== Backpacking trails ===
Algonquin has three backpacking trails that are accessible by foot. Each trail has campsites that may be booked for longer, multi-day hikes, or shorter trail sections may be hiked within a same day.

- Western Uplands Backpacking Trail: 32 km (20 mi), 55 km (34 mi), and 88 km (55 mi) loops and several side hikes. Accessible from highway 60 (km 3.0) and Rain lake access point (west side)
- Highland Backpacking Trail: 21 and 37 km (13 and 23 mi) loops (Note: Officially 19 and 35 km (12 and 22 mi); however, as of June 2025, the bridge over the Madawaska river is permanently closed, adding a 2 km (1.2 mi) detour) with a few lookouts and side trails. Accessible from highway 60 (km 29.7)
- Eastern Pines Backpacking Trail: 6 and 15 km (3.7 and 9.3 mi) loops accessible from the Achray Access Point on the east side of the park

=== Aspects of interior camping ===
Although there are numerous drive-in campgrounds in Algonquin, the park is better known for its interior camping; that is, campsites which are only accessible by canoe or hiking in the summer, or ski or snowshoe in the winter. Algonquin Park provides some of Canada's best canoeing, with hundreds of navigable lakes and rivers forming a 2,000-kilometre-long (1,200 mi) interconnected system of canoe routes. The two main access points to start a trip are located on Canoe Lake and Lake Opeongo. The further a camper proceeds from these access points, the more wild the park becomes, and it is possible to spend several days in the interior with few or no sightings of other campers. Park staff maintain portages between all major and even smaller lakes, and interior campsite reservations can be made through the main Ontario Parks reservation system.

Interior camping can provide excellent wildlife viewing opportunities. The eerie call of the common loon can be heard from every campground and loons can be seen on almost every lake. Moose, deer and beaver can often be seen, especially along waterways, given sufficiently quiet campers. Otters are also present, but less frequently seen. Black bears, although present in the park, are seldom seen, especially if appropriate precautions to avoid attracting them are taken. Wolves may be heard, but will likely remain distant from campers.

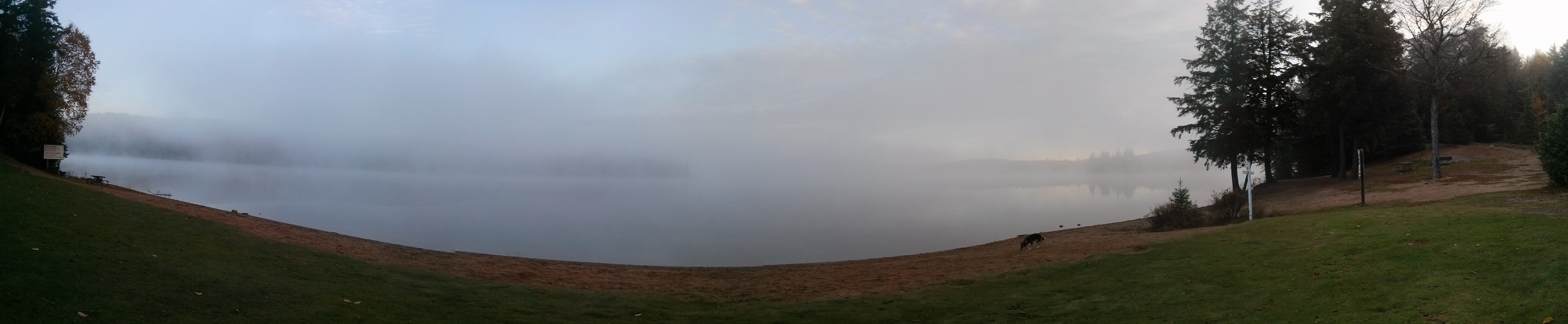
Canisbay Lake during sunrise, autumn 2014

=== Fishing ===
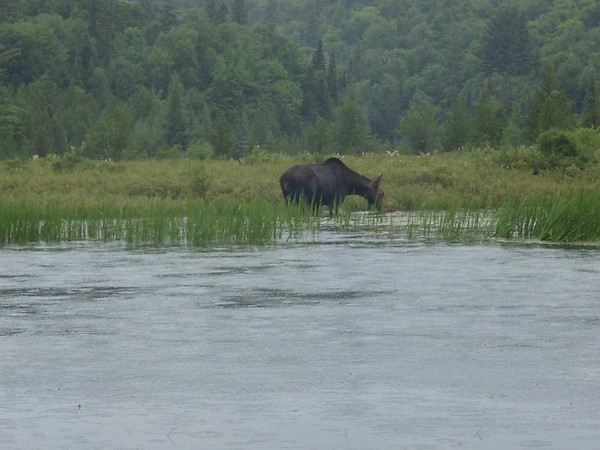
Female moose on the Amable du Fond River in Algonquin

Fishing is allowed in the park for holders of valid Ontario fishing licences, with the purchase of a daily or seasonal vehicle permit as well available through the Ministry of Natural Resources. Fish such as bass, yellow perch, trout and pike can be found in the waterways of the park. The further an angler is willing to travel from an access point, the better the fishing. The backcountry lakes do not receive heavy fishing pressure.

== Services ==
The non-profit Friends of Algonquin Park operate a tourist information station, CFOA-FM.

A direct bus shuttle from Toronto is being run by Parkbus, a non-profit initiative, which is supported by the park.

== Research ==
Algonquin Park has been an important arena for research since the 1930s. Four research facilities exist: Harkness Laboratory of Fisheries Research, Wildlife Research Station, Timber Research Station, and the visitor centre. Over 1800 scientific papers have been published on research done in the park, covering almost every aspect of the park: wildlife, geology, forestry, history, human impacts, etc. In addition, the Park forms a radio quiet zone for the Algonquin Radio Observatory (ARO).

== Summer camps ==
Algonquin Park has been home to many historic summer camps including:

- Algonquin Experience Camp, a now-defunct YMCA camp that was on the north shore of Whitefish Lake;
- Camp Ahmek (boys) and Camp Wapomeo (girls) (The Taylor Statten Camps), on Canoe Lake
- Camp Arowhon] (boys and girls) on Teepee Lake;

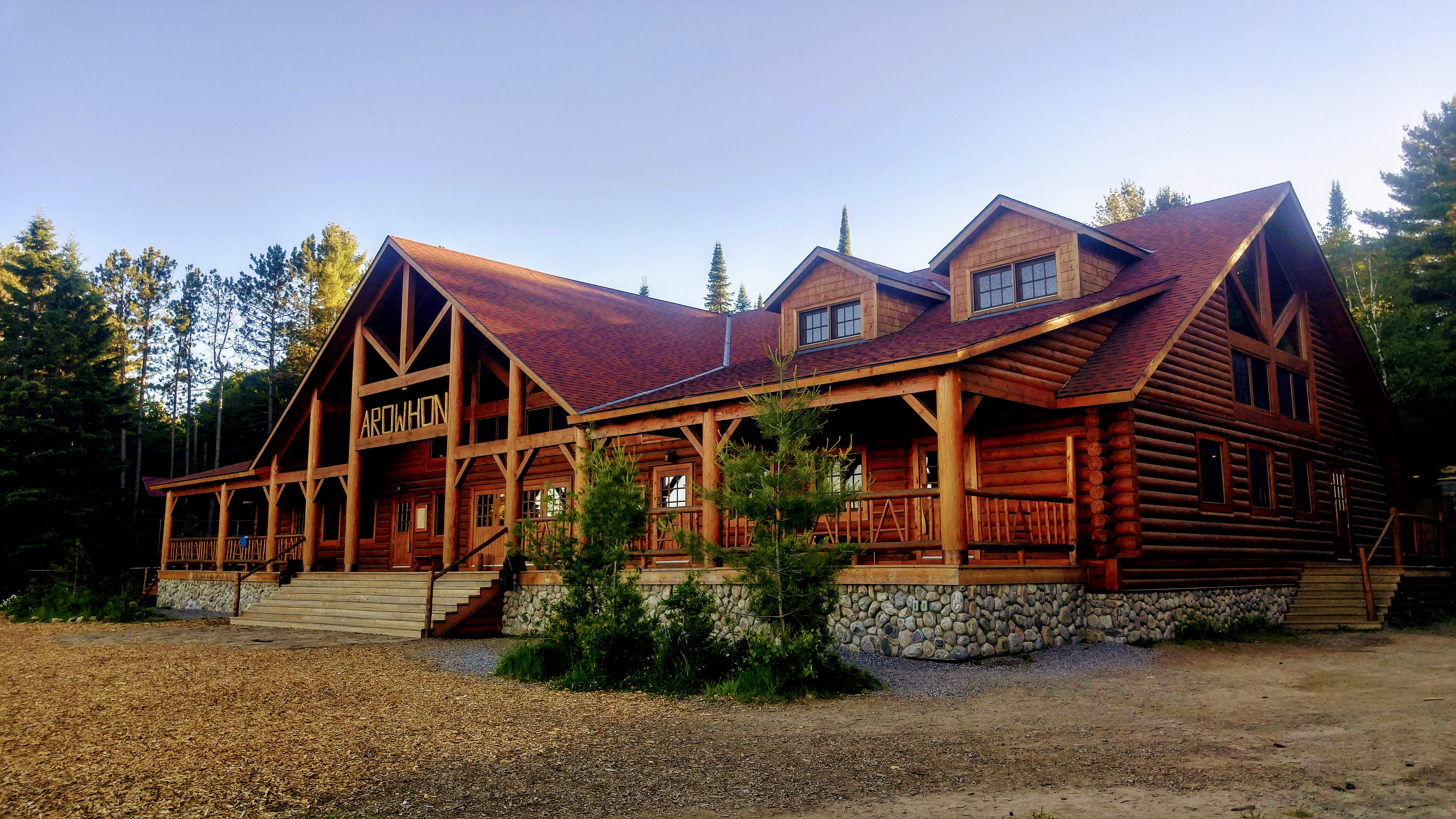
Camp Arowhon's main lodge

- Camp Pathfinder (boys) on Source Lake;
- Northway Lodge (girls) and its affiliate Camp Wendigo, a tripping outpost for boys, on Cache Lake;
- Camp Tamakwa (boys and girls), on South Tea Lake;
- Camp Tanamakoon (girls) on Tanamakoon Lake (linked to Cache Lake);

Camps are members of the Ontario Camping Association.

== Geology and soils ==
Algonquin is almost entirely underlain by the Precambrian-era metamorphic and igneous rock of the Canadian Shield. Quartz-feldspar gneiss and granite are among the most common types. More mafic rock such as hornblende-biotite gneiss and gabbro are occasionally found. The Brent Crater has Ordovician period sedimentary rock, chiefly limestone and sandstone. Glaciation during the Pleistocene epoch left a mantle of glacial till plus sandy and gravelly outwash deposits.

Soils in the park are mostly coarse-textured and of poor quality, typical of the Canadian Shield. The hilly western side (which includes all of the Highway 60 Corridor) has a stony fine sandy loam glacial till which holds water better than the very coarse outwash soils which dominate the eastern side. The dominant soil classification on well drained forest soils is Orthic Humo-Ferric Podzol. The most common soil series on till upland is Monteagle, while Wendigo dominates the outwash area. Classic podzol profile development with a well-defined eluvial (Ae) horizon is the rule; however, in some areas this horizon has been obliterated by disturbance such as earthworm activity. Concerns about effects of non-native earthworms on park soil ecosystems have not led to the banning of worm bait, but anglers are urged to dispose of unused worms in garbage containers.

Gleysolic and organic soils are common where drainage is poor.

== Rivers ==
The park contains and protects the headwaters of these rivers:

- Amable du Fond River
- Barron River
- Bonnechere River
- Gull River
- Madawaska River
- Magnetawan River
- Muskoka River
- Petawawa River
- York River

== Flora and fauna ==
Within the boundaries of the park, the following number of species are known to live: 53 species of mammals, 272 species of birds, 31 species of reptiles and amphibians, 54 species of fish, about 7000 species of insects, over 1000 species of plants, and over 1000 species of fungi. Animals that inhabit Algonquin include moose, black bears, white-tailed deer, Canada jays, beavers, red foxes, great grey owls, and Eastern wolf.

Old growth sugar maple, hemlock and yellow birch forests are common in Algonquin Park. Researchers have aged trees in Algonquin's old-growth forests at up to 430 years old using ring counts, and up to 610 years old using estimation techniques. Some of Algonquin Park's old-growth forest occurs in the recreation-utilization zone and is available for logging.

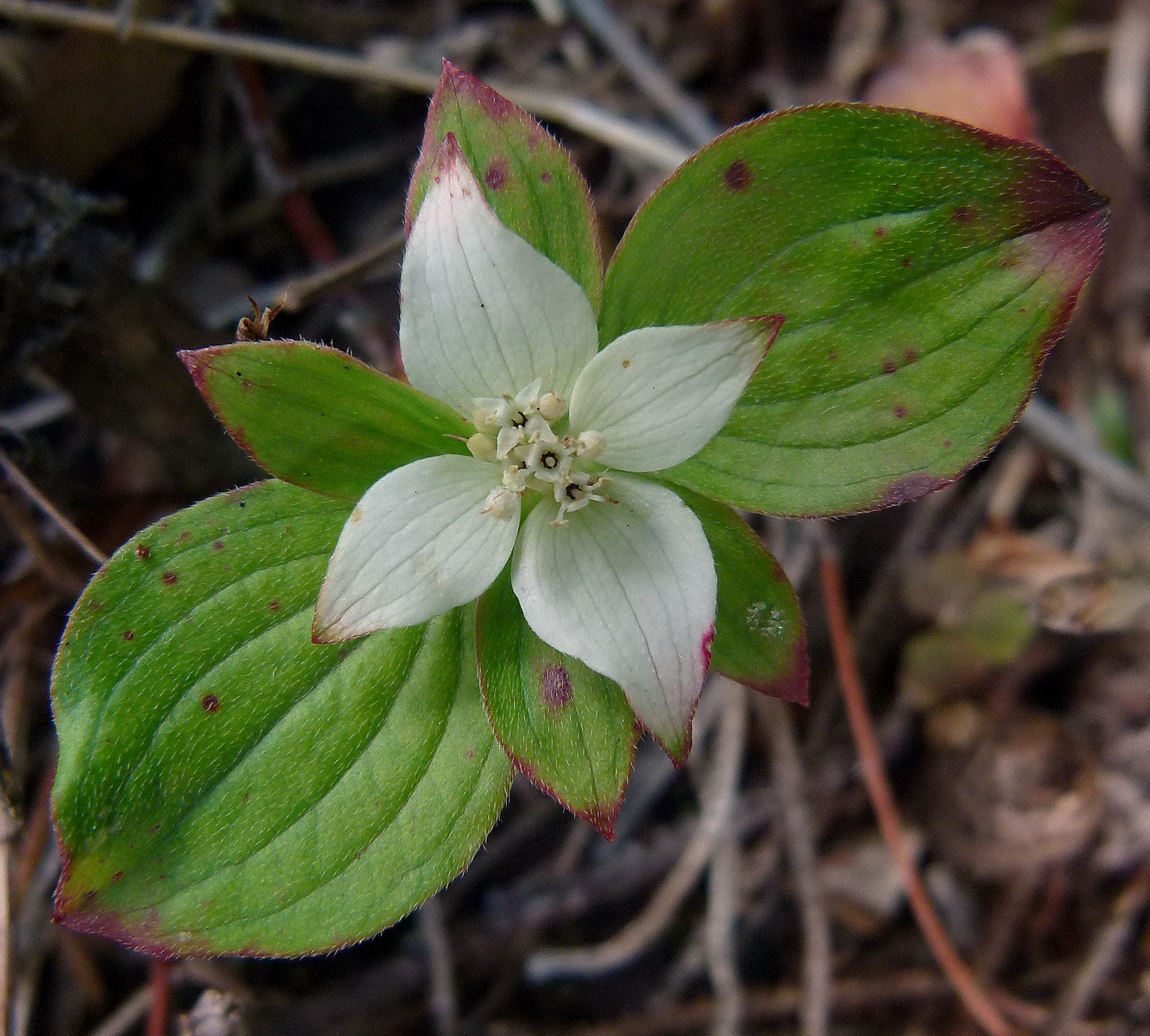
Canadian bunchberry (Cornus canadensis)

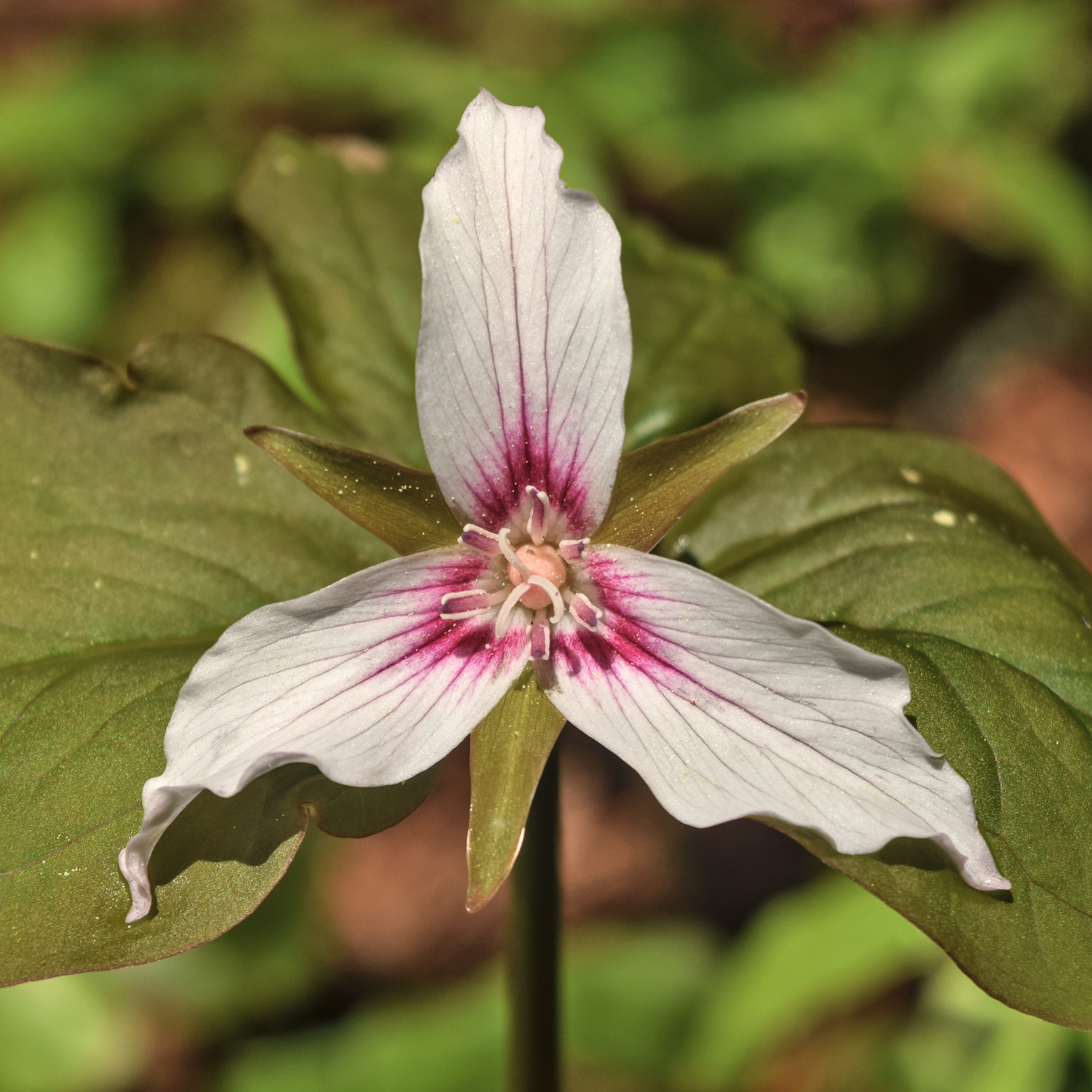
Painted trillium (Trillium undulatum)

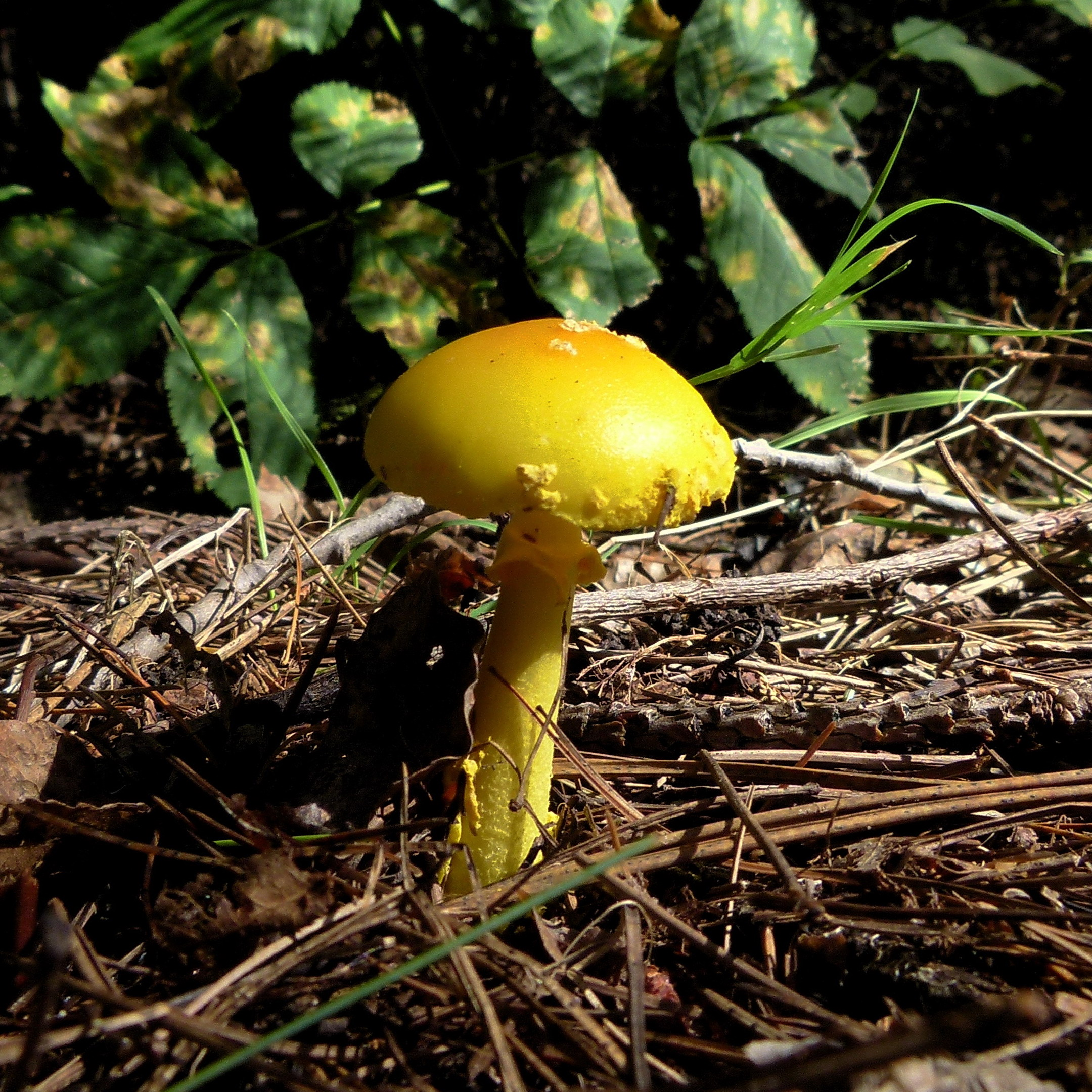
Mushroom in Algonquin Park

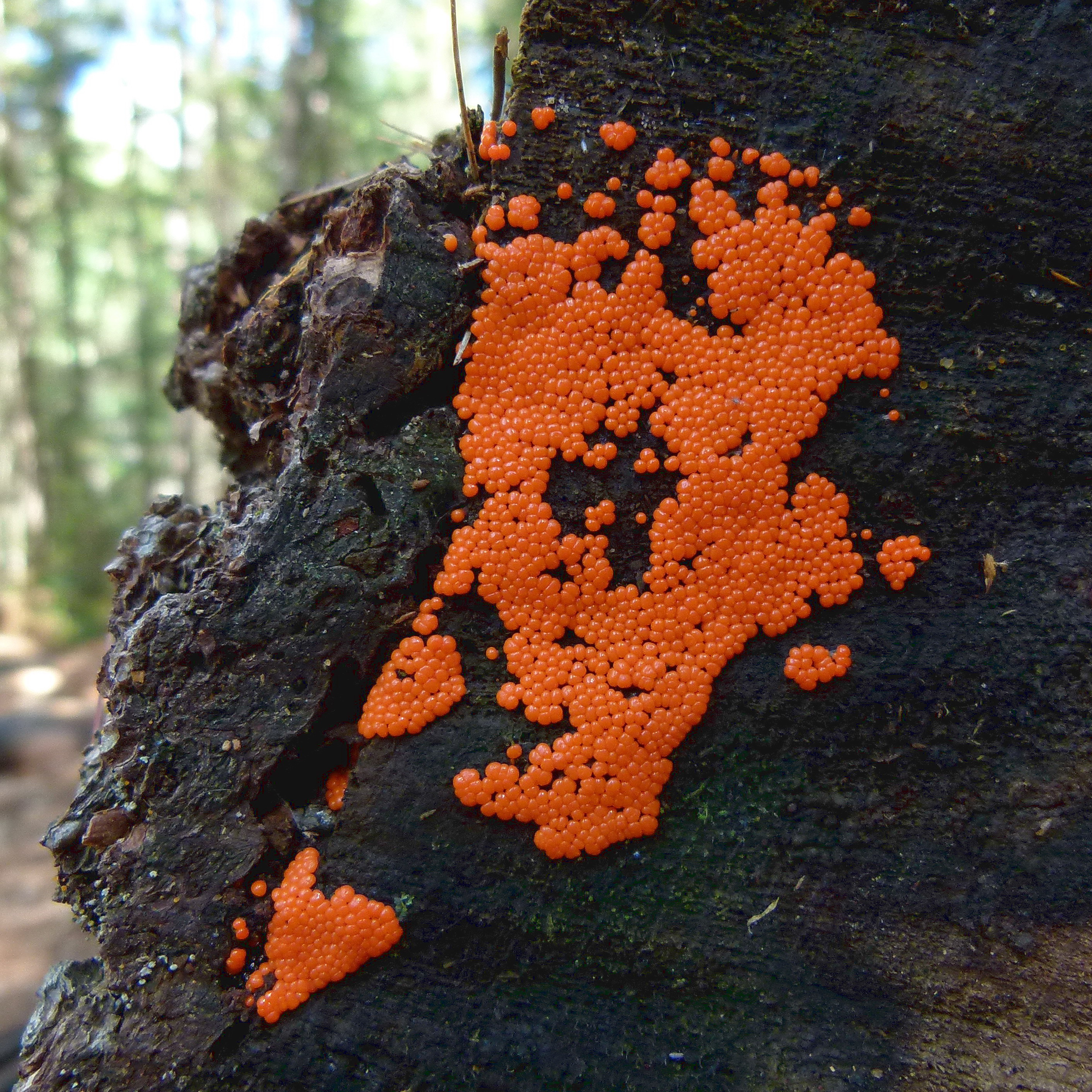
Fungi in Algonquin Park

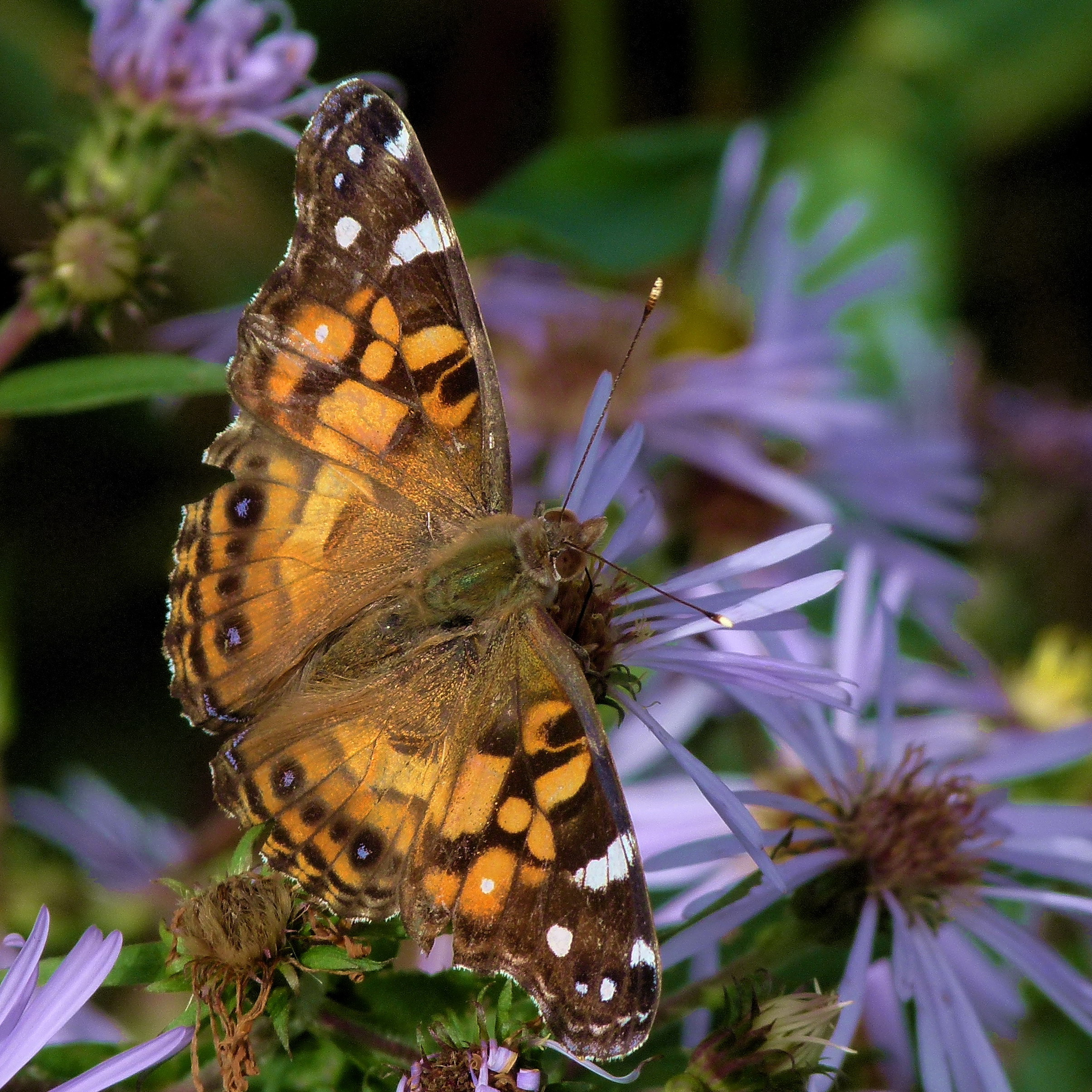
American painted lady butterfly

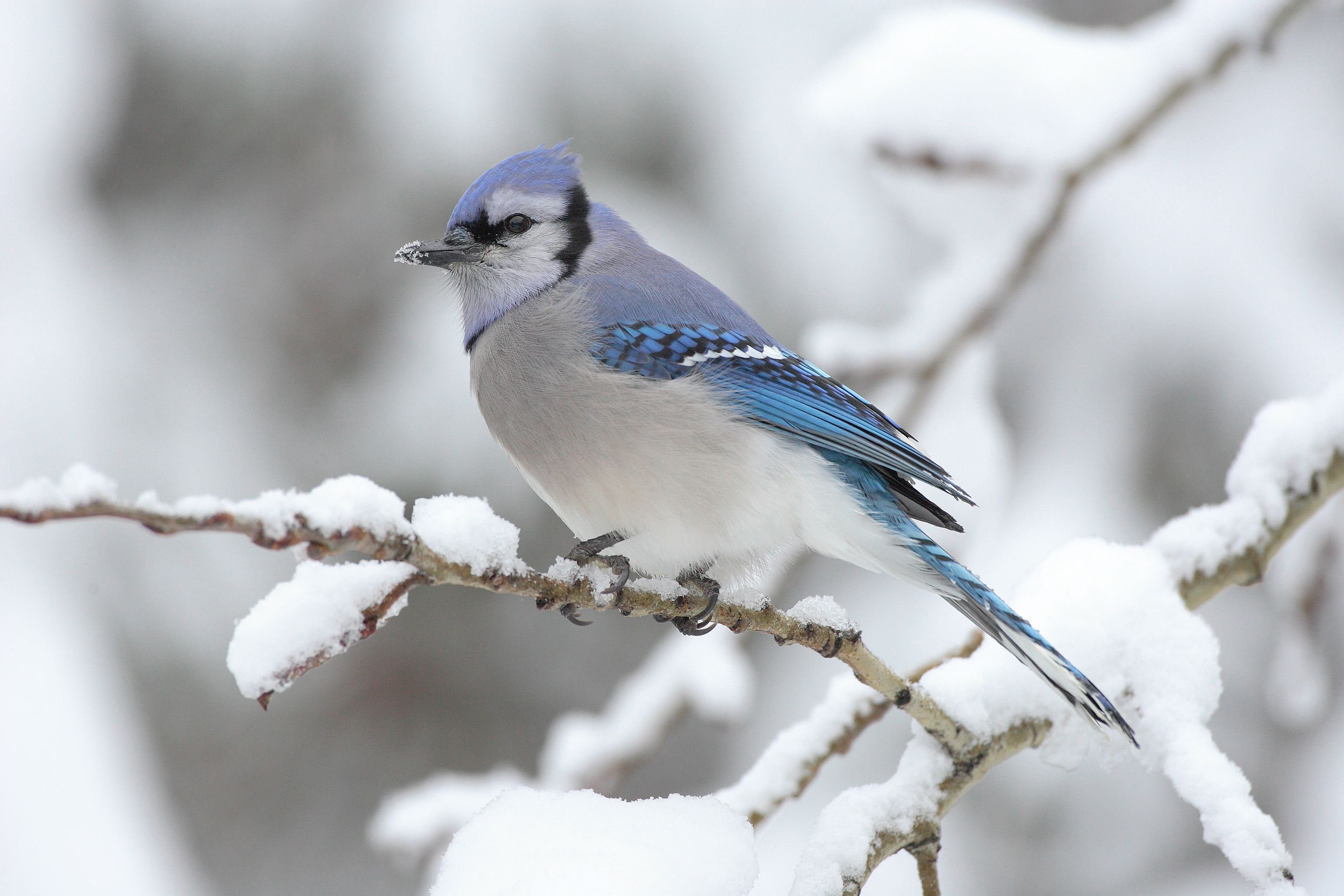
Blue jay (Cyanocitta cristata)

== Famous deaths ==
- Tom Thomson: Canoe Lake, July 1917
- Blair Fraser: Petawawa River (Rollway Rapids), May 1968
- Ken Danby: North Tea Lake, September 2007
- Al Beaton: August 24, 1967

== See also ==
- List of Ontario Parks
