= Petawawa River =

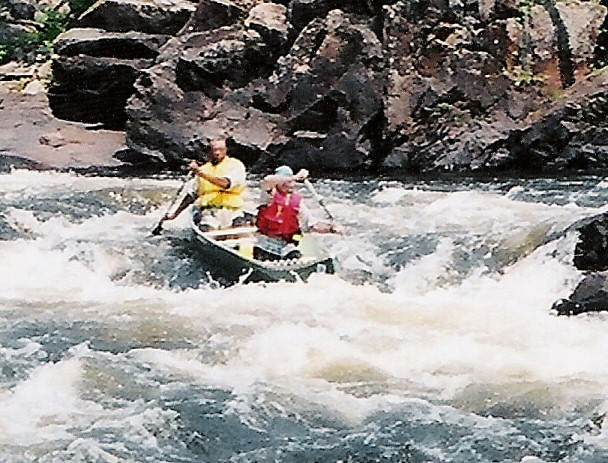
- The dangerous Crooked Chute in Algonquin Provincial Park

- Location of the mouth of the Petawawa River in Ontario
- Etymology: From the Algonquian for "where one hears a noise like this"

Location
- Country: Canada
- Province: Ontario
- Regions: Eastern Ontario; Northeastern Ontario
- County/District: Renfrew County; Nipissing District

Physical characteristics
- Source: Ralph Bice Lake
  - location: Geographic township of Butt, Unorganized South Part, Nipissing District
  - coordinates: 45°40′49″N 78°57′02″W
  - elevation: 443 m (1,453 ft)
- Mouth: Ottawa River
  - location: Petawawa, Renfrew County
  - coordinates: 45°54′38″N 77°15′31″W
  - elevation: 110 m (360 ft)
- Length: 187 km (116 mi)
- Basin size: 4,200 km^{2} (1,600 sq mi)
- Discharge
  - average: 48.7 m^{3}/s (1,720 cu ft/s)
  - minimum: 12.4 m^{3}/s (440 cu ft/s)
  - maximum: 127 m^{3}/s (4,500 cu ft/s)

Basin features
- Progression: Ottawa River→ St. Lawrence River→ Gulf of St. Lawrence
- River system: Ottawa River drainage basin
- Tributaries
  - left: North River, Nipissing River, Tim River
  - right: Barron River, Crow River, Little Madawaska River

The Petawawa River is a river in the Saint Lawrence River drainage basin in Nipissing District and Renfrew County in eastern and northeastern Ontario, Canada. It is located in the traditional territory of the Algonquin and Anishnabek people. This territory is covered by the Upper Canadian Treaties. river flows from Algonquin Provincial Park to the Ottawa River at the town of Petawawa, and is only one of two major tributaries of the Ottawa River to flow completely freely (the other being the Dumoine River). The river's name comes from the Algonquian for "where one hears a noise like this", which refers to its many rapids.

== Course ==
The river starts at Ralph Bice Lake (formerly Butt Lake) in northern Algonquin Provincial Park in the geographic township of Butt in the Unorganized South Part of Nipissing District. It flows south to Daisy Lake then east to Big Trout Lake. The river heads north out the lake over Big Trout Lake Dam, takes in the left tributary Tim River, flows over the Portal Rapids, Cedar Rapids, Snowshoe Rapids, Catfish Rapids, and Stacks Rapids to reach Cedar Lake, the location of the community of Brent, where it takes in the left tributary Nipissing River.

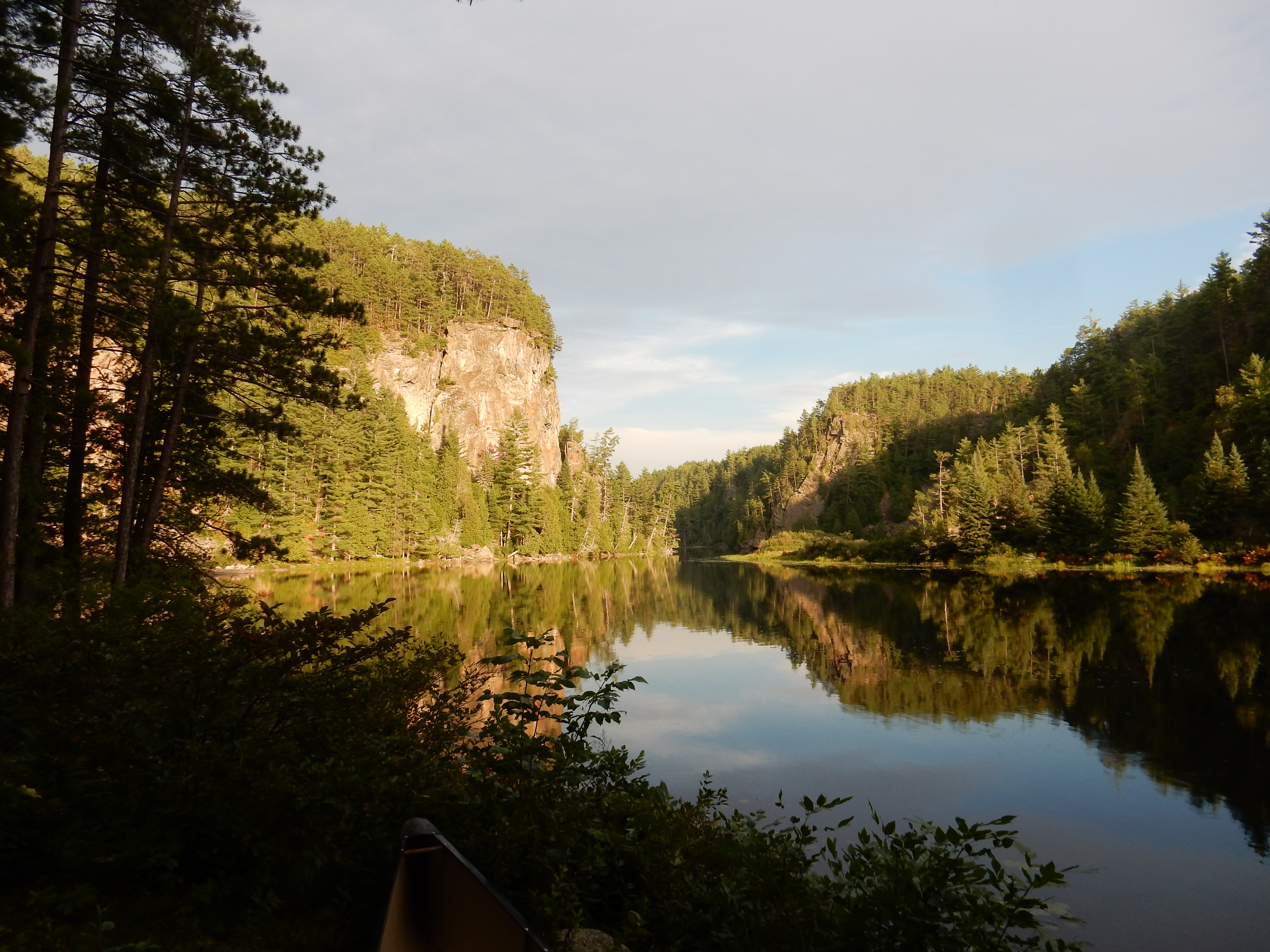
Petawawa River in Algonquin Park

The river exits the lake over a dam, heads through the Devil's Chute, reaches Radiant Lake, where it takes in the left tributary North River and right tributary Little Madawaska River, and passes through the Squirrel Rapids, Big Sawyer Rapids, Battery Rapids Cascade Rapids and White Horse Rapids, and takes in the right tributary Crow River. The river then continues through a series of rapids including the Devil's Cellar Rapids, passes the Algonquin Radio Observatory, and reaches Lake Travers.

The Petawawa River enters a canyon and passes through numerous rapids including the Big Thompson Rapids, Little Thompson Rapids, Grillade Rapids, Crooked Chute, Rollway Rapids, The Natch, Schooner Rapids, Five Mile Rapids to arrive at Whitson Lake adjacent to the Petawawa Hills. It leaves Algonquin Provincial Park and enters the municipality of Laurentian Hills in Renfrew County, continues southeast past CFB Petawawa, passes through the Crooked Rapids, Race Horse Rapids, White Horse Rapids and Halfmile Rapids, and reaches Lac du Bois Dur, where it takes in the right tributary Barron River. The river enters the town of Petawawa, heads under Ontario Highway 17, through the Big Eddy Rapids, under the Canadian Pacific Railway main line, and empties into Black Bay on the Ottawa River.

The river is 187 kilometres (116 mi) in length and drains an area of 4,200 square kilometres (1,600 sq mi). Over the period 1916 to 2024, the Petawawa River has a mean flow of 48.7 cubic metres per second (1,720 cu ft/s). Mean minimal flow is 12.4 cubic metres per second (440 cu ft/s) and mean maximum flow is 127 cubic metres per second (4,500 cu ft/s). Record maximum flow was 279 cubic metres per second (9,900 cu ft/s) in May 2019, while record minimum flow was 5.31 cubic metres per second (188 cu ft/s) in September 1990.

== Economy ==
From the late 19th century until the 1960s, the river was used for log driving of the timber from the forested areas surrounding the river. The river is visited by canoeing and kayaking enthusiasts - both for its white water rapids and its views.

In 2009, based on subsidized power-generation rates in the Ontario Green Energy Act's Feed-in-Tariff (FIT) program, there were plans to build a 5.3 MW hydro-electric generating station at Big Eddy Rapids, about 2 kilometres (1.2 mi) upstream from the river's mouth. The project involved building a concrete and boulder weir that would direct a portion of the water to a new 300 metres (980 ft) long intake channel and powerhouse, as well as a fish ladder. It was scheduled to be operational by 2015, but the project raised opposition from the local communities, paddlers, and environmental groups. Both Big Eddy Rapids and Half Mile Rapids would have been affected.

The project was among nineteen FIT hydro projects on ten rivers that were cancelled in 2015 after their FIT contracts were terminated following the opposition by groups like the Ontario Rivers Alliance.

== Geology ==
Part of the Petawawa River lies in the Ottawa-Bonnechere Graben, a 175 million year old rift valley.

== Tributaries ==
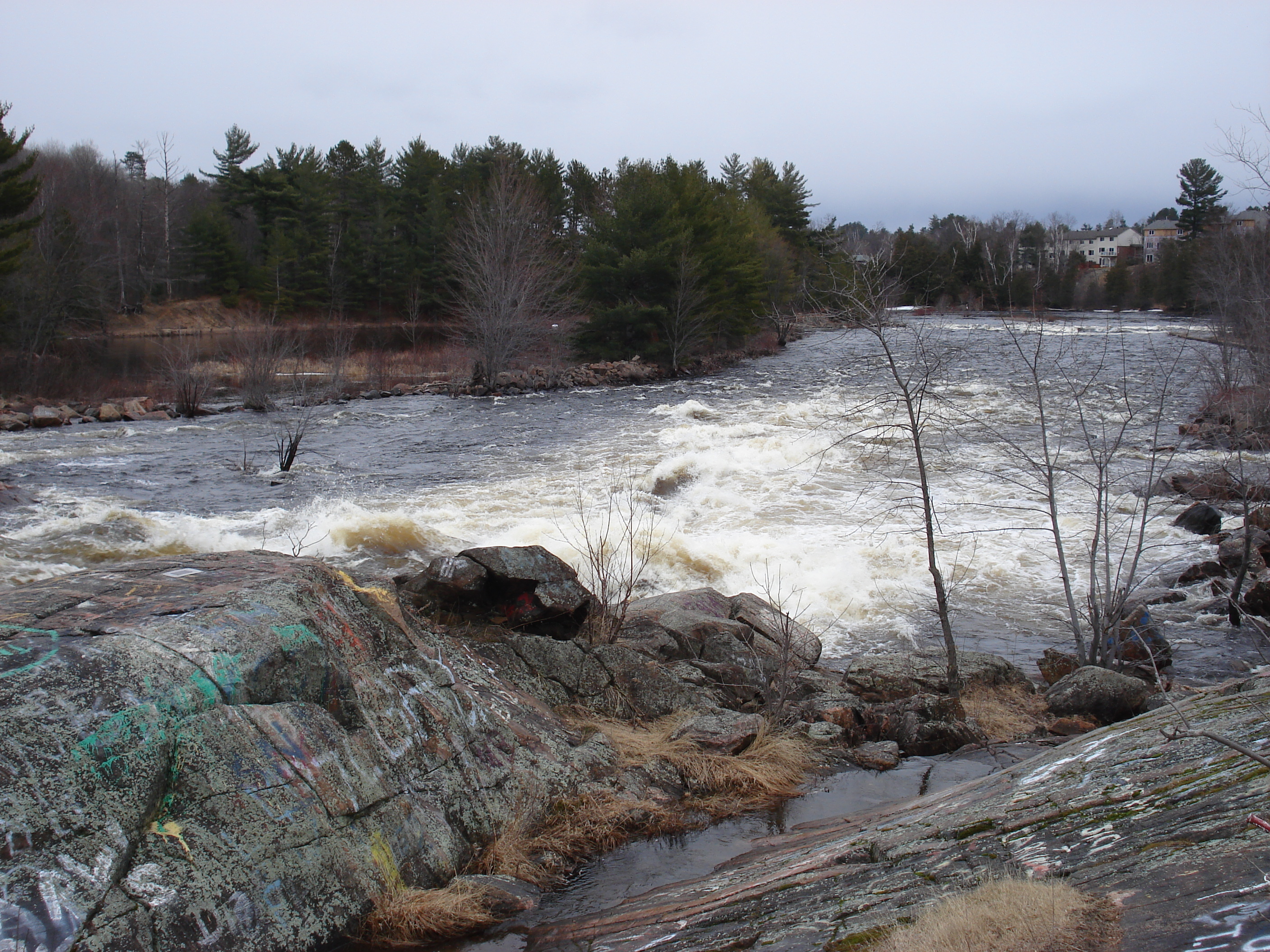
The river as it runs through the town of Petawawa

Tributaries of the Petawawa River in upstream order:

- Jorgens Creek (left)
- Lac du Bois Dur
  - Charlebois Creek (left)
  - Barron River (right)
  - Black Bay Creek (right)
- Centre Creek (left)
- Black Duck Creek (left)
- Lorne Creek (right)
- Military Creek (left)
- Cartier Creek (left)
- Louie Creek (left)
- Emma Creek (right)
- Blue Beech Creek (left)
- Clouthier Creek (right)
- North Rouge Creek (left)
- Lake Travers
  - Otterpaw Creek (left)
  - Deerhorn Creek (left)
  - Travers Creek (right)
  - Whitson Creek (right)
- Eustache Creek (right)
- Wagtail Creek (right)
- Crow River (right)
- Pauguk Creek (right)
- Battery Creek (right)
- Plover Creek (left)
- Radiant Lake
  - Menona Creek (left)
  - North River (left)
  - Little Madawaska River (right)
- George Creek (left)
- Cedar Lake
  - Nipissing River (left)
  - Cauchon Creek (left)
  - Gilmour Creek (left)
  - Peboan Creek (left)
  - Ghost Creek (left)
  - Wendigoes Creek (right)
  - Pukina Creek (right)
- Sunfish Creek (right)
- Pugwa Creek (right)
- Haydes Creek (left)
- Minnehaha Creek (left)
- Spiza Creek (right)
- Alder Creek (left)
- Tim River (left)
- Mire Creek (left)
- Otterslide Creek (right)
- Dan Creek (right)
- She Creek (right)
- Timberwolf Creek (right)
- Wenona Creek (right)
- Mack Creek (left)
- Daisy Lake
  - Hambone Creek (right)
  - Casey Creek (right)

== See also ==
- List of rivers of Ontario

== Sources ==
- McMurtrie, Jeffrey (2008). "Algonquin Provincial Park and the Haliburton Highlands". Wikimedia Commons. Archived from the original on 2011-06-29.
- Map 9 (PDF) (Map). 1 : 700,000. Official road map of Ontario. Ministry of Transportation of Ontario. 2010-01-01.
- Restructured municipalities - Ontario map #5 (Map). Restructuring Maps of Ontario. Ontario Ministry of Municipal Affairs and Housing. 2006. Archived from the original on 2020-05-11.
