= Little Madawaska River (Maine) =

Location
- Country: United States

Physical characteristics
- Source
  - location: Maine
- Mouth
  - location: Aroostook River
  - coordinates: 46°50′38″N 67°56′45″W
  - elevation: 350 feet (110 m)

Basin features
- Progression: Aroostook — St. John — Bay of Fundy

The Little Madawaska River is a 42.6-mile-long (68.6 km) river in northern Maine. From its source (46°53′32″N 68°19′46″W) in Maine Township 14, Range 5, WELS, it runs northeast and southeast to its confluence with the Aroostook River at Grimes Mill, about 3 miles (5 km) downstream from Caribou.

== See also ==
- List of rivers of Maine
