= Little Madawaska River (Ontario) =

- Location of the mouth of the Little Madawaska River in Ontario

Location
- Country: Canada
- Ontario: Ontario
- Region: Northeastern Ontario
- District: Nipissing
- Part: Nipissing, Unorganized South

Physical characteristics
- Source: Lake La Muir
  - location: Freswick Township
  - coordinates: 45°50′59″N 78°32′57″W
  - elevation: 394 m (1,293 ft)
- Mouth: Petawawa River
  - location: Deacon Township
  - coordinates: 45°59′03″N 78°18′45″W
  - elevation: 279 m (915 ft)

Basin features
- River system: Saint Lawrence River drainage basin

The Little Madawaska River is a river in the Saint Lawrence River drainage basin in the Unorganized South Part of Nipissing District in northeastern Ontario, Canada. The river is entirely within Algonquin Provincial Park, and is a right tributary of the Petawawa River and not a tributary of the nearby Madawaska River.

== Course ==
The river begins at Lake La Muir in the geographic township Freswick Township and flows northeast to Hogan Lake. It continues northeast from the lake controlled by a small dam to Phillip Lake, from which it also continues to flow northeast controlled by a dam. The river then empties into Radiant Lake on the Petawawa River in Deacon Township, near the unincorporated place of Odenback. The Petawawa flows via the Ottawa River to the Saint Lawrence River.

== Tributaries ==
- Owenee Creek (left)
- Oldcamp Creek (right)
- Charles Creek (right)
- Philip Lake
  - Grizzly Creek (right)
  - Cinderella Creek (left)
- Hogan Lake
  - Hemlock Creek (right)
- Lake La Muir
  - Grosbeak Creek

== See also ==
- List of rivers of Ontario

== Sources ==
- McMurtrie, Jeffrey (2008). "Algonquin Provincial Park and the Haliburton Highlands". Wikimedia Commons. Archived from the original on 2011-06-29.
- Map 9 (PDF) (Map). 1 : 700,000. Official road map of Ontario. Ministry of Transportation of Ontario. 2010-01-01.
- Restructured municipalities - Ontario map #5 (Map). Restructuring Maps of Ontario. Ontario Ministry of Municipal Affairs and Housing. 2006.
