= Speckled Trout Creek (Algoma District) =

- Location of the mouth of Speckled Trout Creek in Ontario

Location
- Country: Canada
- Province: Ontario
- Region: Northeastern Ontario
- District: Algoma
- Township: Labonte

Physical characteristics
- Source: Speckled Trout Lake
  - coordinates: 47°20′09″N 84°30′00″W
  - elevation: 418 m (1,371 ft)
- Mouth: Lake Superior
  - coordinates: 47°18′46″N 84°36′21″W
  - elevation: 183 m (600 ft)

Basin features
- River system: Great Lakes Basin

Speckled Trout Creek is a creek in geographic Labonte Township, Algoma District in Northeastern Ontario, Canada. It is almost entirely in Lake Superior Provincial Park, is in the Great Lakes Basin, and empties into Lake Superior.

Speckled Trout Creek begins at Speckled Trout Lake and heads west under the Algoma Central Railway, to the east of the dispersed rural community of Frater, and enters Lake Superior Provincial Park. It turns southwest, then west, passes under Ontario Highway 17 and reaches Lake Superior.

== See also ==
- List of rivers of Ontario
