= Franz station =

Railway station in Ontario, Canada

Franz

General information
- Location: Franz, Ontario; Canada
- Coordinates: 48°27′45″N 84°24′40″W
- Owner: Via Rail

Construction
- Structure type: Sign post

History
- Former names: Canadian Pacific Railway

Services
Preceding station	Via Rail	Following station
Swanson toward White River	Sudbury–White River	Lochalsh toward Sudbury
Former services
Preceding station	Canadian National Railway	Following station
Dubreuilville toward Sault Ste. Marie	Algoma Central Railway	Hilda toward Hearst
Preceding station	Canadian Pacific Railway	Following station
Amyot toward Vancouver	Main Line	Lochalsh toward Montreal Windsor
Location

Franz railway station is a railway station located in the community of Franz, Unorganized North part Algoma District, northeastern Ontario, Canada. It is a Via Rail flag stop station on the Sudbury – White River train; service by the Algoma Central Railway ended in July 2015.

In his autobiography, Stompin' Tom: Before the Fame (Viking, 1995), Canadian country/folk-singing legend Stompin’ Tom Connors relates the story from the early 1950s of him and a travelling companion, Steve Foote, disembarking from a freight car as the train they were on slowed through Franz. “When the train slowed down at one point,” Connors writes, “we figured we must be coming into Hearst [their destination]. So we jumped off and decided to walk into town. But there was no town. There was only a railroad gang there — mainly Métis or Cree — and only one building where they all ate and slept.” A worker told them they had “made a big mistake” and were “still out in the middle of the bush.” After inquiring after the foreman for work, the latter — who “looked like a big bear” — “started up the tracks with a big shovel in his hand, hollering, ‘get the f—— out of here before I cut your heads off with this spade!’” It took Connors and Foote four and half days of walking the tracks to get to Hearst, a distance Connors estimated at over a hundred miles.
