= Oba, Ontario =

Coordinates: 49.058331°N 84.102960°W

Oba is a dispersed rural community in Ontario, Canada. It is recognized as a designated place by Statistics Canada.

== Demographics ==
In the 2021 Census of Population conducted by Statistics Canada, Oba had a population of 5 living in 2 of its 21 total private dwellings, a change of -66.7% from its 2016 population of 15. With a land area of 100.92 km^{2} (38.97 sq mi), it had a population density of 0.0/km^{2} (0.1/sq mi) in 2021.

== Transportation ==
Oba was the junction between the Algoma Central Railway and the Canadian Northern Railway. Canadian National Railway acquired the Canadian Northern in 1923 and the Algoma Central Railway in 2001. Canadian National sold the former Algoma Central line for Oba south to the Agawa Canyon Railroad in 2022.

Oba is served by Via Rail at the Oba station.

Railway services
- Preceding station	Via Rail	Following station
  Hornepayne toward Vancouver	The Canadian	Elsas toward Toronto
  Former services
  Preceding station	Canadian National Railway	Following station
  Mosher toward Sault Ste. Marie	Algoma Central Railway	Wyborn toward Hearst
  Albany Forks toward Vancouver	Main Line	Neswabin toward Montreal

== See also ==
- List of communities in Ontario
- List of designated places in Ontario
