= Hornepayne station =

Railway station in Hornepayne, Canada

Hornepayne
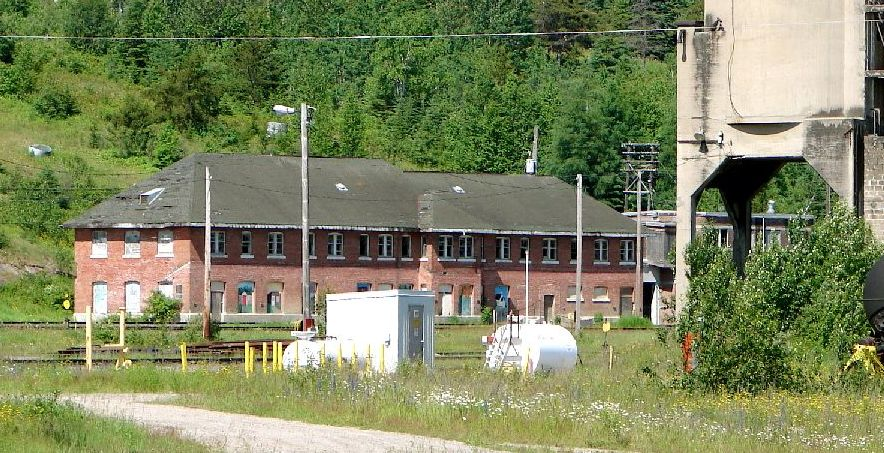
- View of the station in 2009.

General information
- Location: Hornepayne, ON; Canada
- Coordinates: 49.2188°N 84.7753°W
- Owner: Via Rail

Construction
- Structure type: Sign post

History
- Opened: 1913
- Closed: building demolished October 2020
- Former names: Canadian Northern Railway; Canadian National Railway

Services
Preceding station	Via Rail	Following station
Hillsport toward Vancouver	The Canadian	Oba toward Toronto

Former services
Preceding station	Canadian National Railway	Following station
Tondern toward Vancouver	Main Line	Shekak toward Montreal
Location

Hornepayne railway station is located in the township of Hornepayne, Ontario, Canada. This station is served by Via Rail's transcontinental train The Canadian.

The station was established in 1913 by the Canadian Northern Railway as a divisional point and headquarters for the Superior Division, under the name Fitzbach railway station; its name was changed to Hornepayne around 1920. Before the completion of the northern section of Highway 631 in 1959, the town was dependent on the railway for transportation of supplies into the community.

The historic station building, built in 1921, was a designated property under the Heritage Railway Stations Protection Act. Despite this, CN applied for and was granted permission to demolish it, due to safety concerns. The demolition was completed in 2020.
