= Agawa Canyon =

Valley in Ontario, Canada

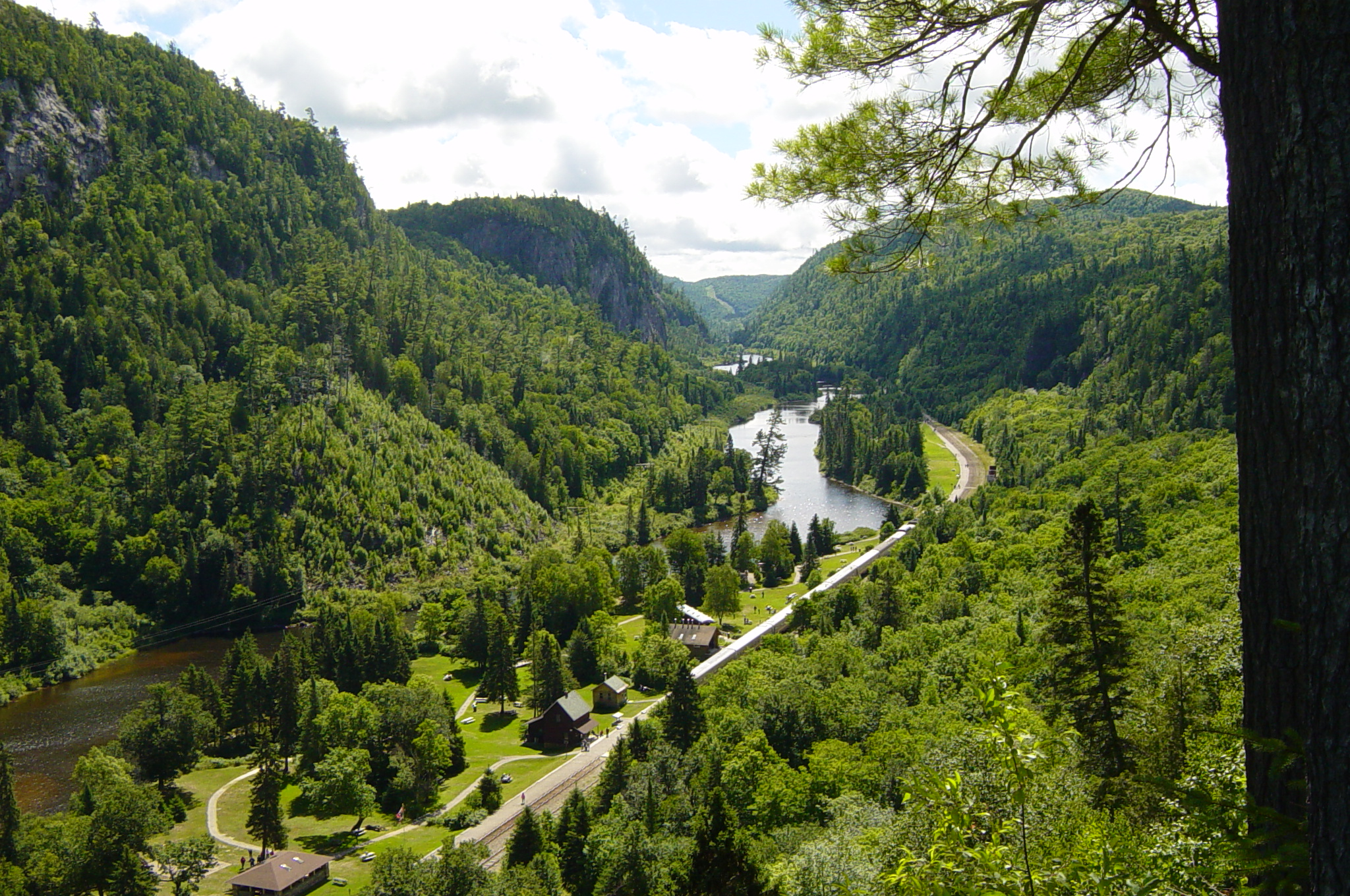
- The Agawa Canyon Wilderness Park

- Location within Ontario
- Floor elevation: 316 m (1,037 ft)
- Long-axis direction: North-south
- Depth: 175.2 metres (575 ft)

Geology
- Type: Geologic fault expanded by erosion

Geography
- Location: Algoma District, Ontario, Canada
- Coordinates: 47°27′20″N 84°29′22″W
- Topo map: NTS 41N8 Grey Owl Lake
- Traversed by: Algoma Central Railway
- Rivers: Agawa River
- Interactive map of Agawa Canyon

The Agawa Canyon is a shallow canyon located deep in the sparsely populated Algoma District in Northeastern Ontario, Canada. It was created 1.2 billion years ago by faulting along the Canadian Shield and then enlarged by the erosive action of the Agawa River. The Agawa Canyon Wilderness Park is only accessible by hiking trail or the Agawa Canyon station on the Algoma Central Railway, and is located 114 miles (183 km) by rail north west of Sault Ste. Marie.

== Geography ==
At their highest point, the walls of the Agawa Canyon rise 175.2 metres (575 ft) above the river. The park is situated in the transitional zone between the Great Lakes – St. Lawrence Forest region and the Boreal Forest, with diverse and numerous representative flora from both regions present in the canyon. Annual snowfall in the canyon exceeds 450 centimetres (180 in), with a record snowfall of 782 centimetres (308 in) recorded during the winter of 1989.

Four waterfalls dot the canyon's rim and feed the Agawa River. The North and South Black Beaver Falls are 53.3 metres (175 ft) high. The tallest waterfall in the park is Bridal Veil Falls at 68.5 metres (225 ft). Otter Creek Falls is the shortest waterfall at 13.7 meters (45 ft). The upper part of Otter Creek provides natural spawning beds for speckled trout, with the falls itself fed by small beaver ponds above the canyon.

== Flora and fauna ==
Common plant species that flower in the spring and summer include fireweed, yellow and orange hawkweed, Oxeye daisy, nodding trillium, and yellow clintonia. Species flowering later in the season include viper's bugloss, bladder campion, yarrow, evening primrose and a variety of asters.

Beaver and otter are abundant in the Agawa River, as are several species of duck including mergansers, wood ducks and goldeneyes. The steep canyon walls and proximity of the rail tracks render the area fairly unappealing to moose and bear; however, the area abounds with small mammals, including chipmunks, meadow voles and groundhogs. Commonly sighted birds include ravens, robins, grackles, ruffed grouse, and great blue herons. A variety of raptors frequent the canyon including merlins, golden eagles, broad-winged hawks and American kestrels.

== History ==
The first track in the Agawa Canyon was laid during the winter of 1911. The Algoma Central Railway began development of the Agawa Canyon Wilderness Park in 1952 with the clearing of a picnic area. With increased service from Algoma Central's Agawa Canyon Tour Train, the area's natural environment makes it a tourist stop. Since 1952, over three million people have visited Agawa Canyon. The word Agawa is native Ojibway for "shelter".

Between 1918 and 1923, several members of the Group of Seven painted in the Algoma region including Lawren Harris, A. Y. Jackson, Frank Johnston, J. E. H. MacDonald, and Arthur Lismer. To access this area they rented a boxcar from The Algoma Central Railway, which had been outfitted like a cabin and was shunted to sidings near choice painting locations. From these locations they set out on foot or canoe to capture this untamed area on canvas.

== Attractions ==
Five short nature trails cross the park area: the Ed Foote Trail, Lookout Trail, Otter Creek Trail, River Trail, and Talus Trail.

Visitors to the canyon can climb 372 steps that lead to the "Lookout" located on the wall of the gorge. The observation platform situated 76 metres (250 ft) above the tracks provides a panoramic view of the canyon.

The Algoma Central Railway offers tour trains to the canyon in the summer, fall and winter months; during late September and October for the changing colors and in December, January and February for the "snow train".

Ice climbing is another activity that visitors may participate in. Some classic routes in this area are Trestle, Salmon Run and Sweating Whiskey. The train drops off the climbers between mile 110 to 114 and the campers usually have tents, or non-permanent shelters set up near the tracks.

== See also ==
- Achray, Ontario
- Barron River (Ontario)
- Lake Superior Provincial Park
- Ouimet Canyon
