= Canyon station =

Canyon station could refer to:

- Canyon station (Via Rail) in Canyon, Kenora District, Ontario, Canada
- Canyon station (Algoma Central Railway) in Canyon, Algoma District, Ontario, Canada
