= Algoma Central Railway =

Canadian train company

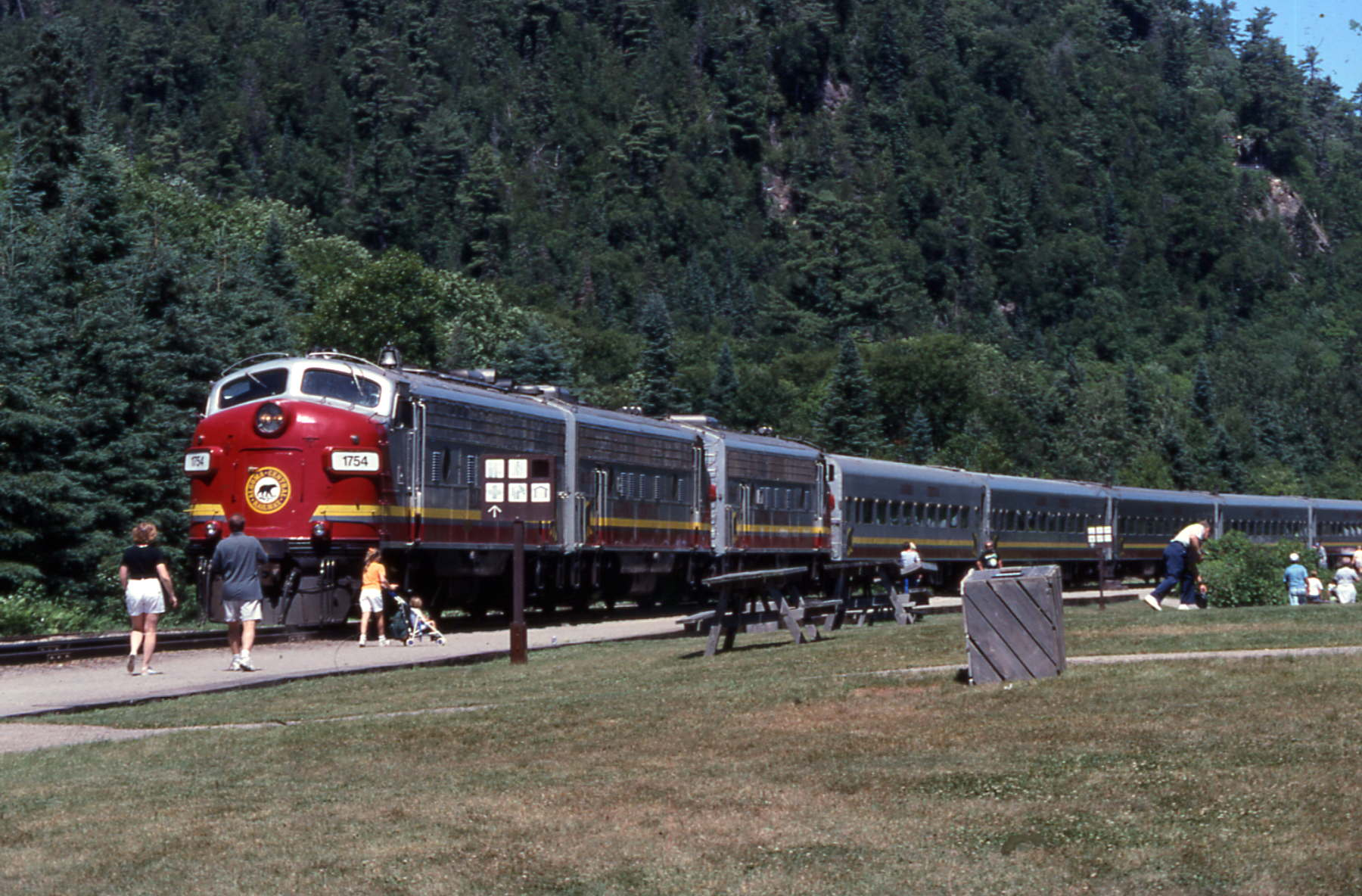
- Algoma Central Railway's popular tour train stopped in the Agawa Canyon park

Overview
- Headquarters: Sault Ste. Marie, Ontario
- Reporting mark: AC
- Locale: Northern Ontario, Canada
- Dates of operation: 1899–
- Successor: Canadian National Railway

Technical
- Track gauge: 4 ft 8 1/2 in (1,435 mm) standard gauge

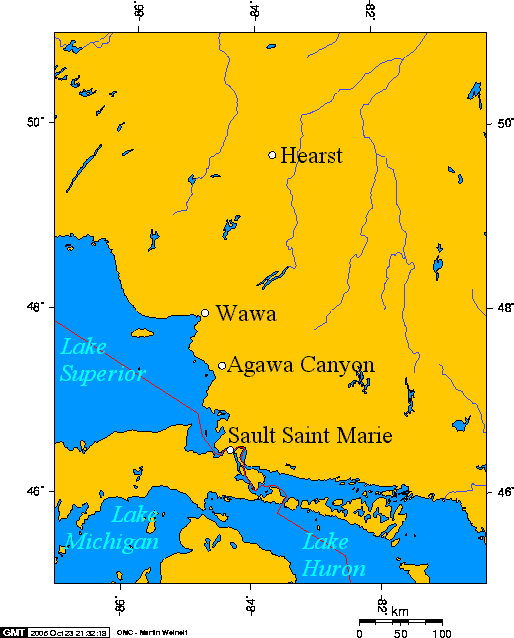
Waypoints on the Algoma Central Railway

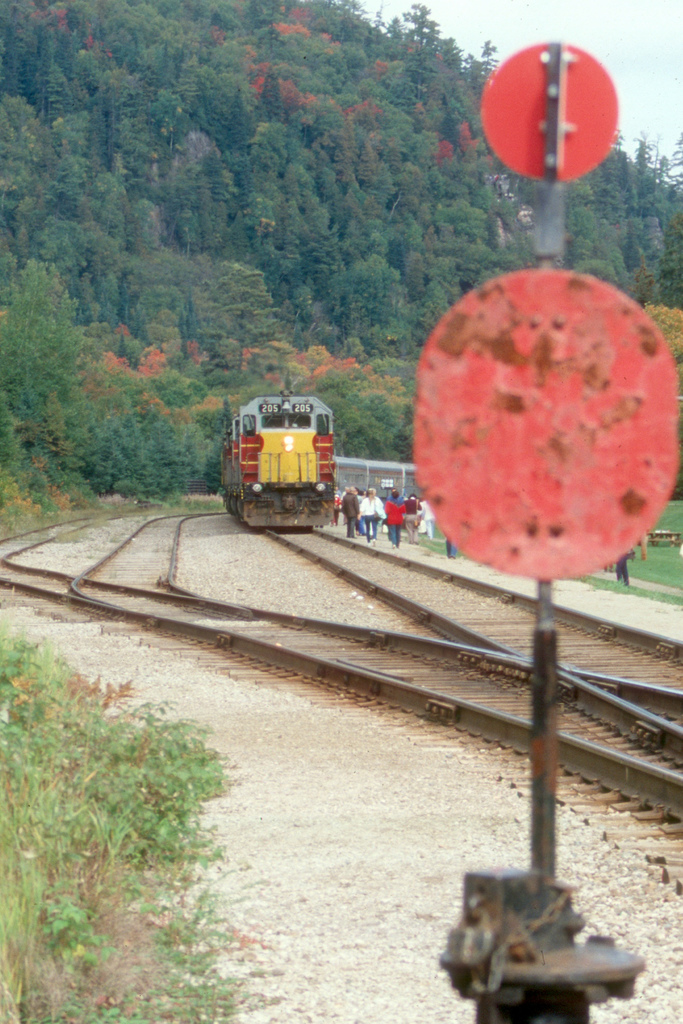
Agawa Canyon, 1988

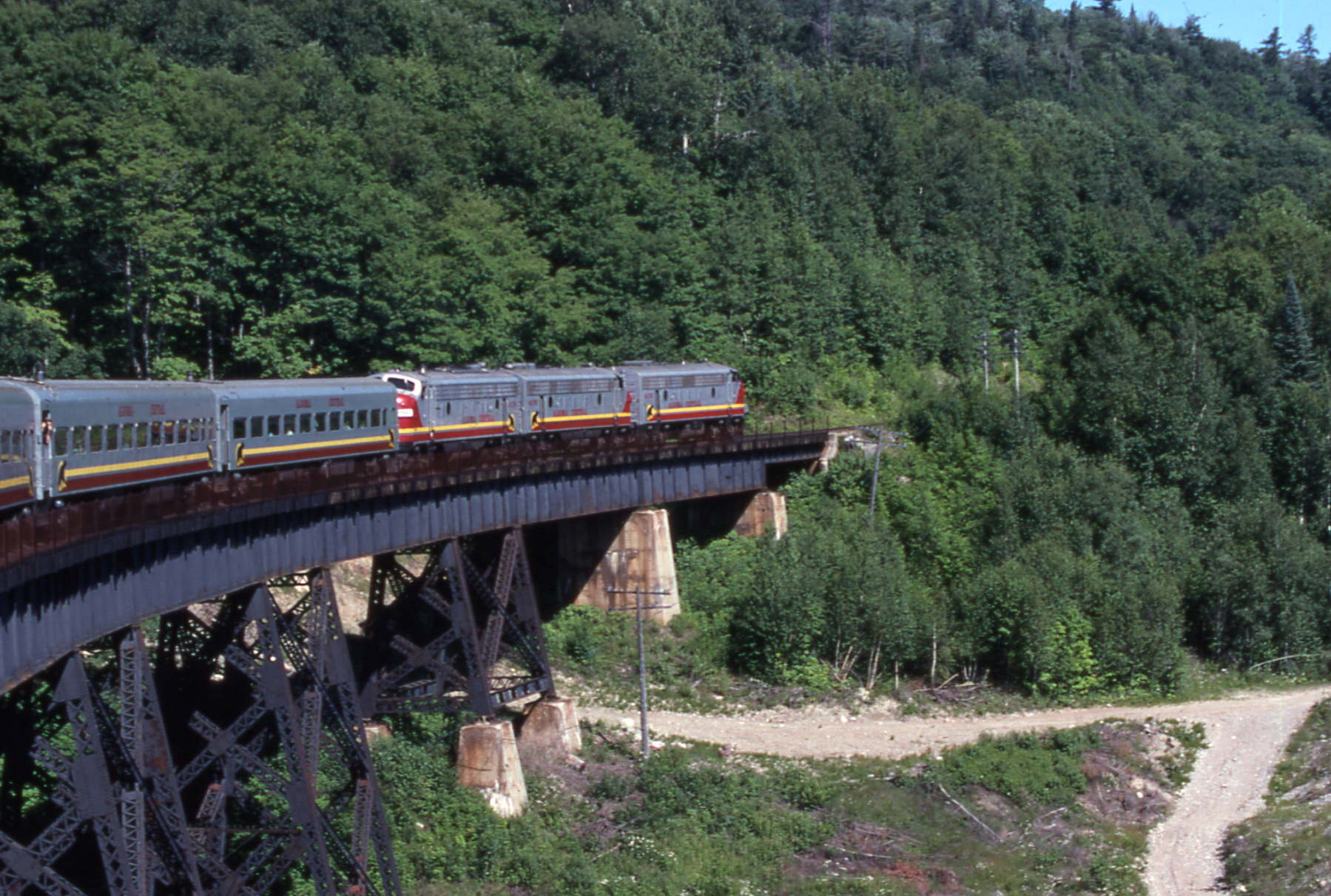
Crossing Montreal River

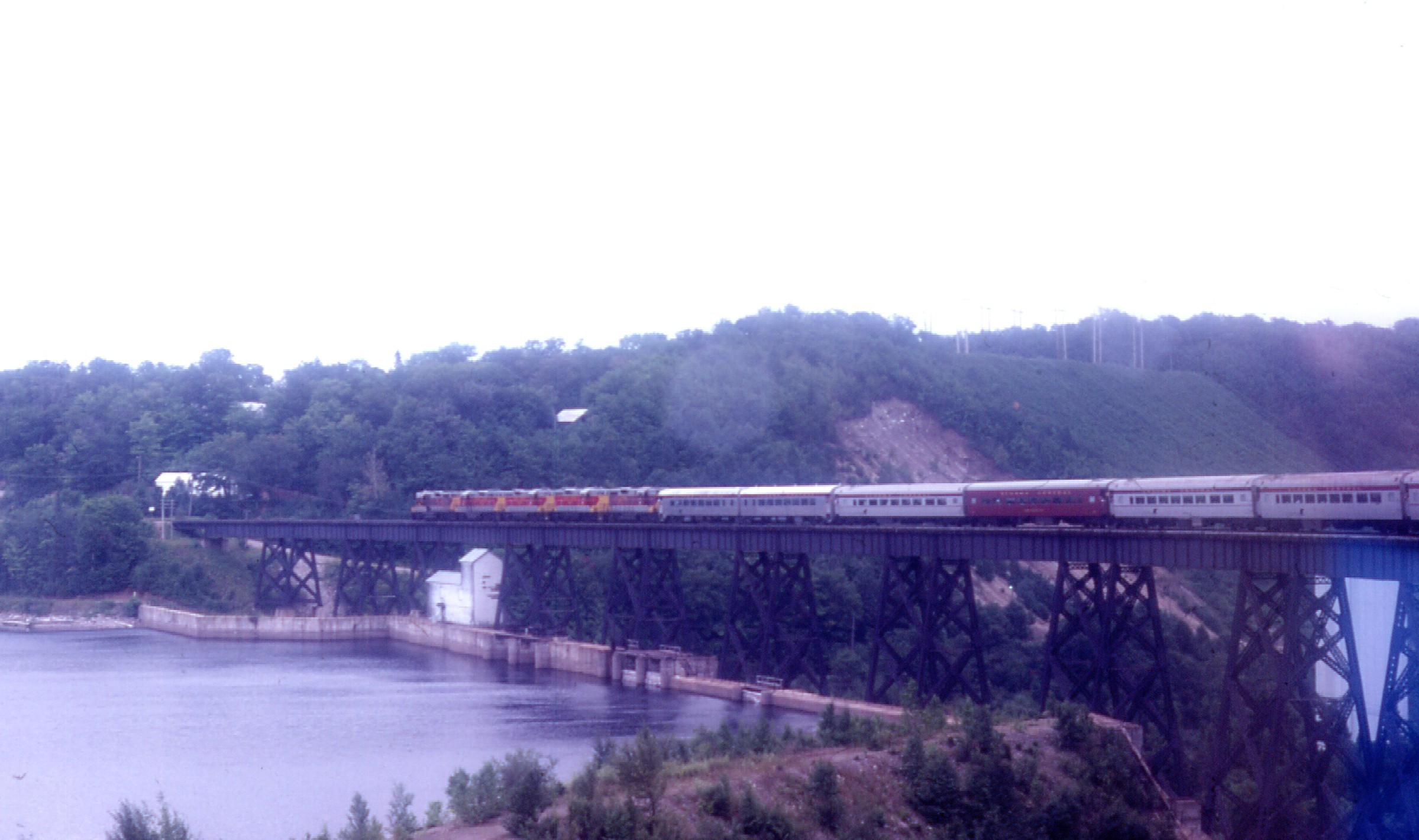
Crossing Montreal River, 1978

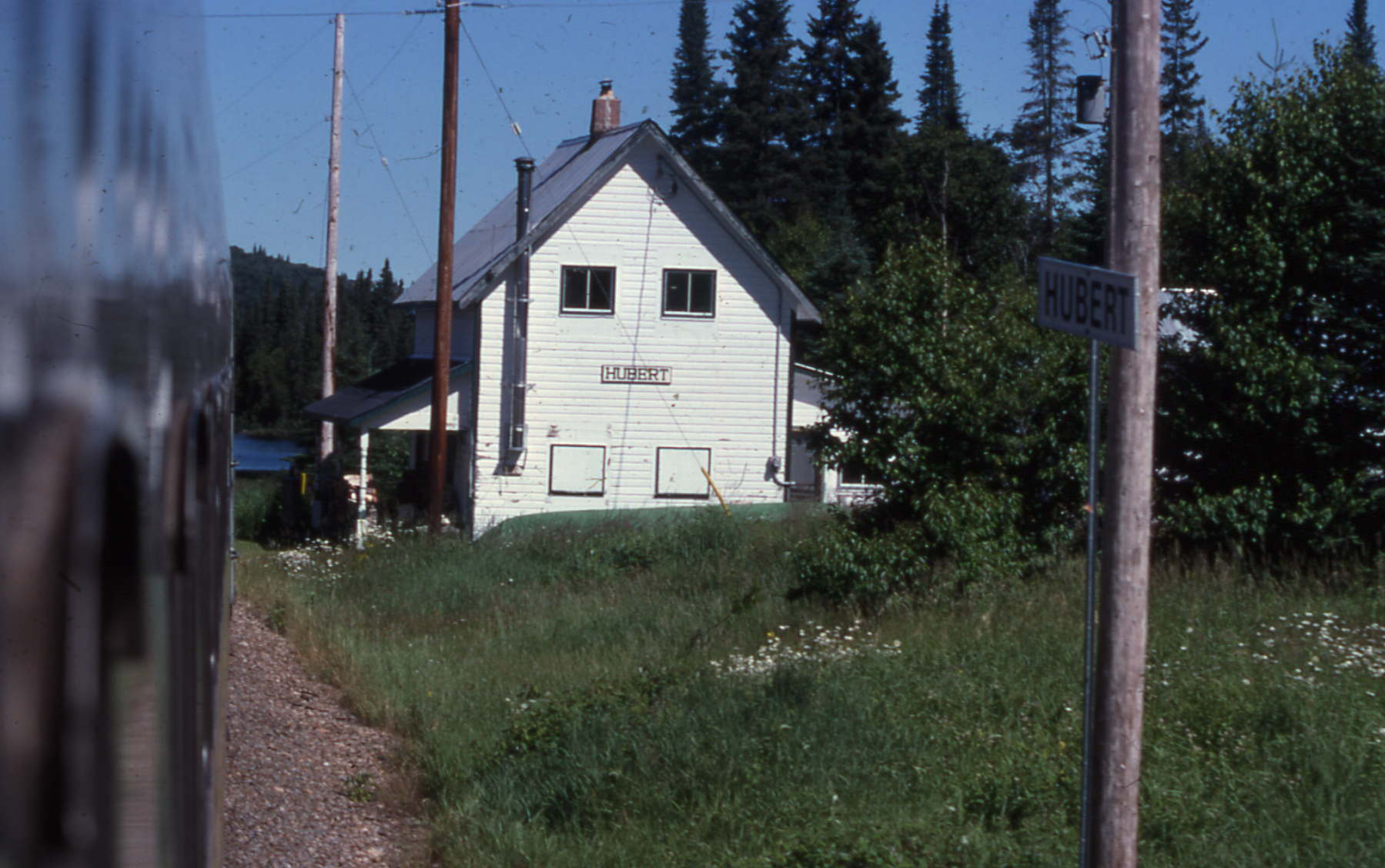
Hubert

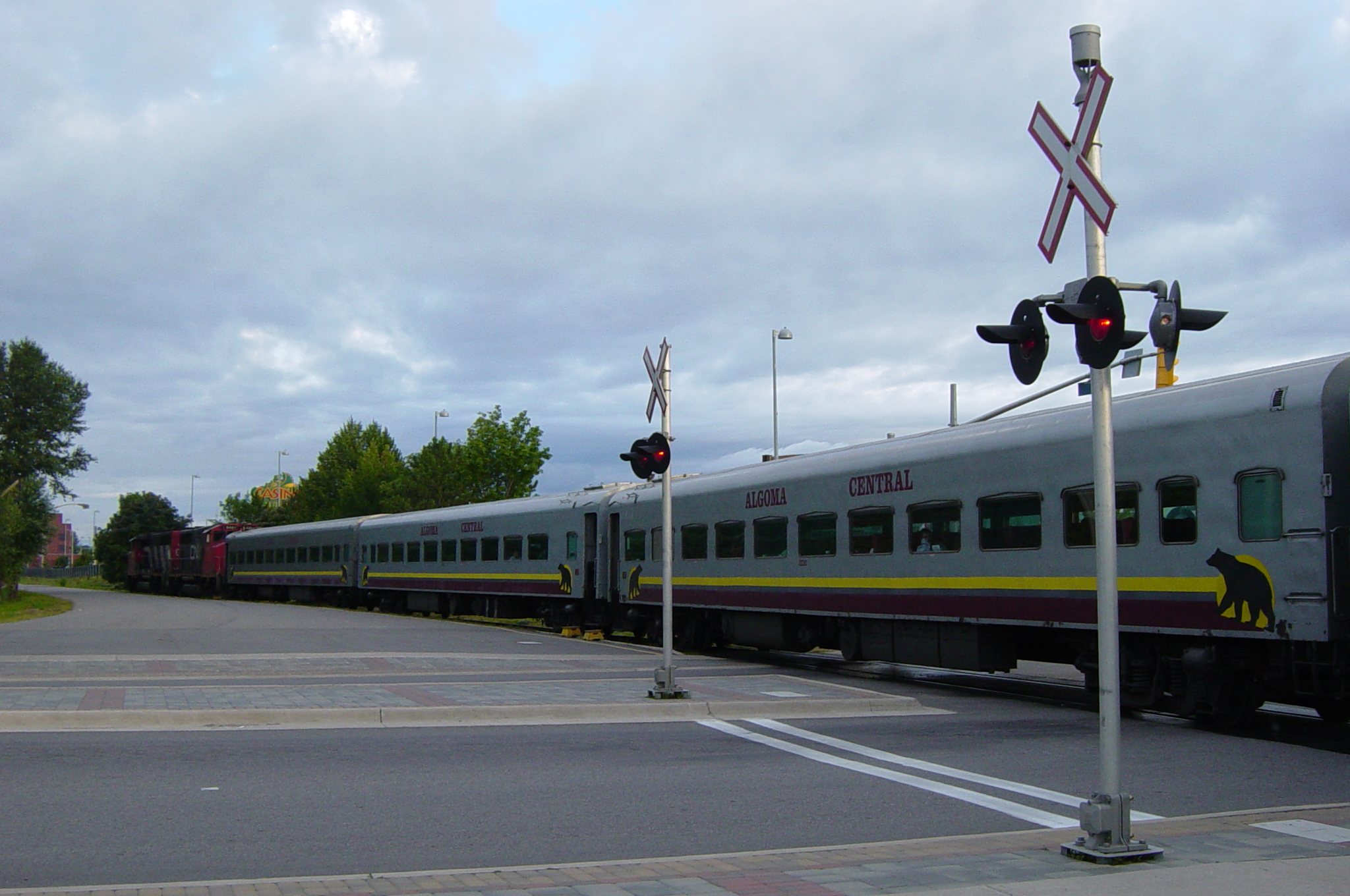
Far end of a tour train parked at Sault Ste. Marie station, out of frame to the right

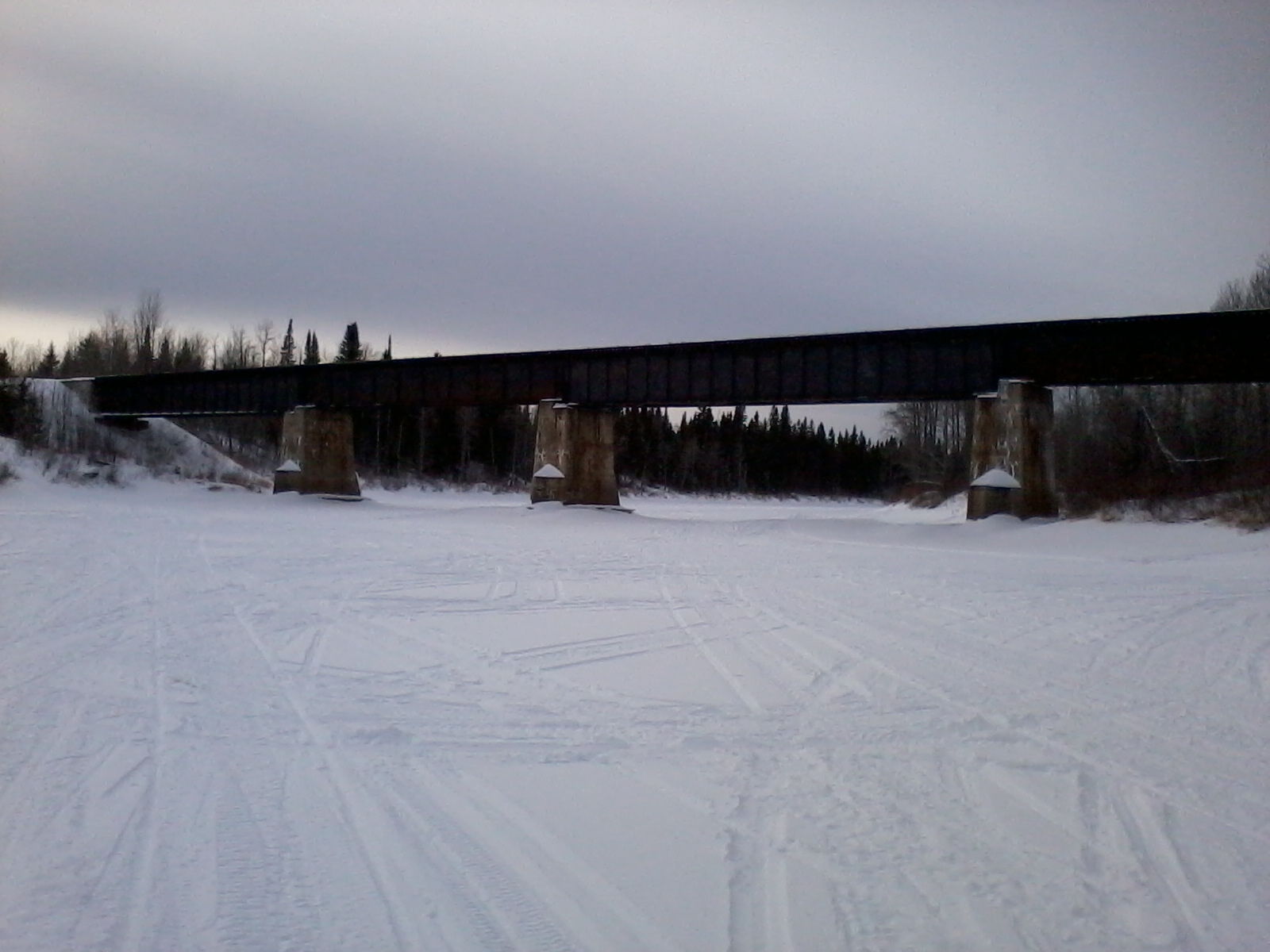
Bridge over Mattawishkwia River south of Hearst

The Algoma Central Railway (reporting mark AC) is a railway in Northern Ontario, Canada, that operates between Sault Ste. Marie and Hearst. It used to have a branch line to Wawa. The area served by the railway is sparsely populated, with few roads.

The railway is well known for its Agawa Canyon tour train. Until 2015, the line also provided passenger train service to canoeists, snowmobilers, cottagers and tourists accessing this wilderness recreation region. The railway connects at its northernmost point with the Ontario Northland Railway and with CN's eastern division to the south. It also intersects with the Canadian Pacific Kansas City at Franz and with the Huron Central Railway at its southernmost point in the Sault.

Since 2022, the segment between Oba and Sault Ste. Marie is owned by Watco and known as the Agawa Canyon Railroad.

== History ==
=== Early history ===
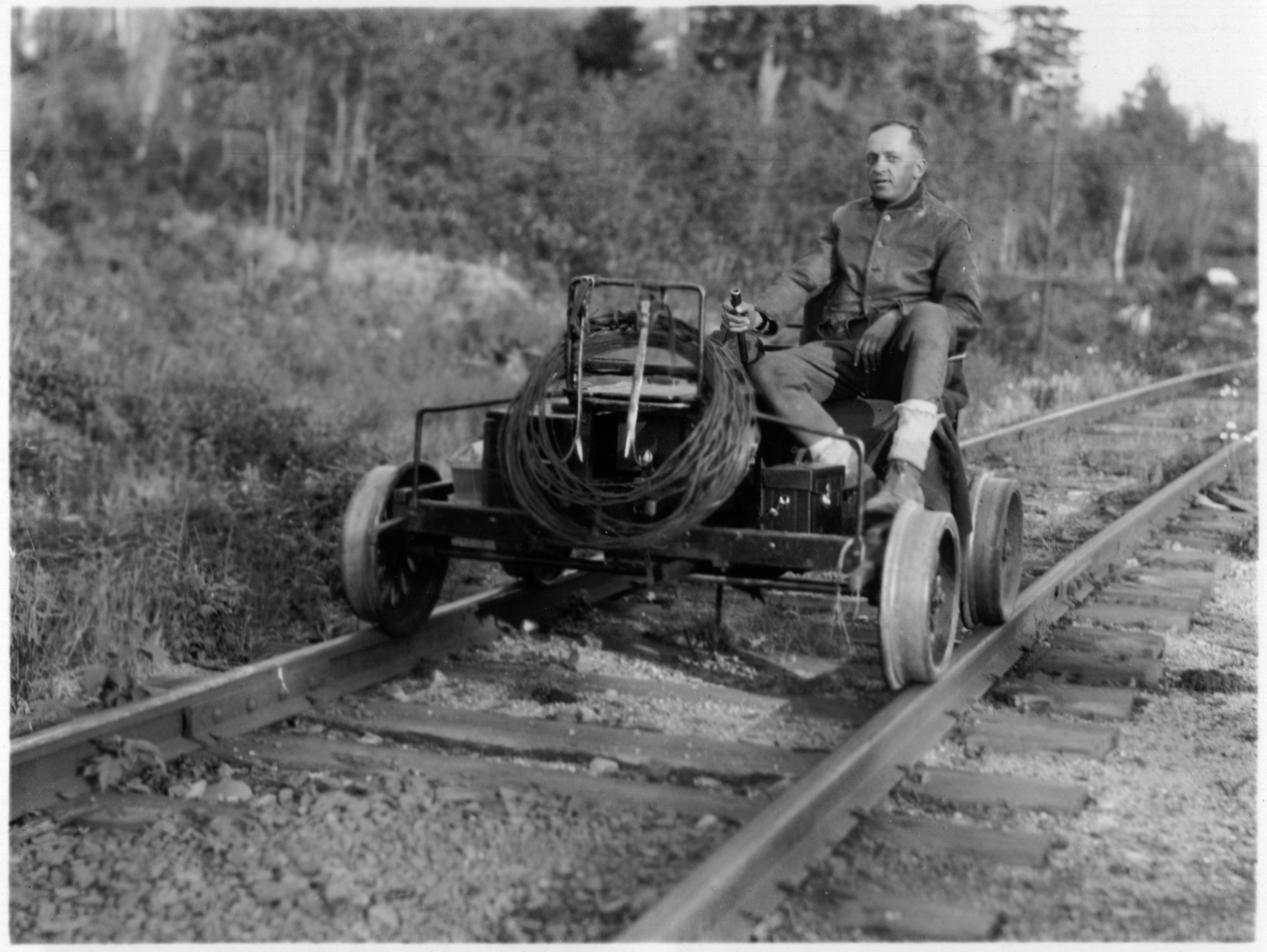
Algoma Central Railway telephone car, Algoma District, Ontario, [ca. 1925]

The Algoma Central Railway was first owned by Francis H. Clergue, who required a railway to haul resources from the interior of the Algoma District to Clergue's industries in Sault Ste. Marie; specifically, to transport logs to his pulp mill and iron ore from the Helen Mine, near Wawa, to a proposed steel mill (which was later named Algoma Steel). The Algoma Central Railway was chartered on August 11, 1899. The railway's Dominion and provincial charters gave it authority to build north from Sault Ste. Marie to a junction with the Canadian Pacific Railway's main line, as well as a branch line to Michipicoten Harbour, on Lake Superior near Wawa.

In 1901, Clergue acquired the charter of the Ontario, Hudson Bay and Western Railway, which was intending to build a line between the CPR main line and Hudson Bay. He then changed the name of the Algoma Central Railway to The Algoma Central and Hudson Bay Railway Company, anticipating a connection either to Moose Factory on James Bay or to some point on Hudson Bay.

The Algoma Central fell victim to the bankruptcy of Clergue's Consolidated Lake Superior Company in 1903. At that time, the line reached 90 km (56 mi) north of Sault Ste. Marie, with a 32 km (20 mi) segment running east from Michipicoten Harbour that did not yet connect with the main line. Construction was stopped, but it was subsequently resumed in 1909 and the line was extended northward through to junctions with the Michipicoten Harbour branch (at Hawk Junction), the Canadian Pacific Railway (at Franz) and the Canadian Northern Railway (at Oba). In 1914, it finally reached Hearst, a town 476 km (296 mi) north of Sault Ste. Marie that was a divisional point on the National Transcontinental Railway. By that point, Clergue's dream of building a railway to Hudson Bay or James Bay had long been abandoned, and the railway's northern terminus remained at Hearst, around 240 km (150 mi) from James Bay. However, the phrase and Hudson Bay was not removed from the railway's name until June 30, 1965.

The Algoma Central was the first Canadian railway to operate fully with diesel fuel, in 1952.

The railway had been in the shipping business since 1900, when it had purchased four steamships. Starting during the 1960s, the railway greatly expanded its marine operations and diversified into trucking, real estate, forestry, and mining operations. These operations were more profitable than the railway operations, and on April 30, 1990, as part of a corporate reorganization, the name of the company was changed to Algoma Central Corporation, with the Algoma Central Railway becoming one of its subsidiaries. A few years later, the Algoma Central Railway was put up for sale.

=== Wisconsin Central and Canadian National eras ===
On February 1, 1995, Wisconsin Central Ltd. purchased Algoma Central Railway Incorporated, operating the railway as a separate subsidiary, Wisconsin Central Canada Holdings. In 1998, Algoma Steel closed its iron ore mine in Wawa and the branch line between Michipicoten Harbour and Hawk Junction was abandoned. Wisconsin Central Ltd. was acquired by Canadian National on October 9, 2001, whereupon the Algoma Central became part of CN's Eastern Division.

In January 2014, CN announced it was cutting the service from Sault Ste. Marie to Hearst, blaming the Canadian federal government for cutting a subsidy necessary to keep the service running. The passenger service, which runs three days per week, provides year-round access to remote tourist camps and resorts. The average annual ridership is estimated to be 10,600 passengers. It has been argued in the past as an essential service; however, the service has always been deemed financially uneconomic.

In February, a working group attempting to save the line hired BDO Canada LLP, an accounting firm, to assess the financial impact to the region when the service is scheduled to end April 29. The working group, composed of municipalities, first nations, and cottager associations, all had a vested interest in the continuation of the service. According to preliminary findings, BDO determined passenger rail service in the Algoma district generates between $38 million and $48 million in annual economic activity. It supports as many as 220 jobs and delivers more than $5 million in tax revenues.

In April 2014, the federal government extended funding for one year so that CN would continue to provide the passenger service. The $2.2-million subsidy was to facilitate the provision of service until 2015. In March 2015, Railmark Canada Ltd assumed the passenger service with the intention to increase services and marketing.

In March 2015, the Canadian government guaranteed funding of the service for an additional three years.

In June of the same year, Canadian National said it would stop the service on July 15 after it was unable to make a deal with Railmark Canada. The government subsidy still stood, but a new rail operator needed to be sought by the regional stakeholders group. Railmark was unable to secure a line of credit from a lending group, which hindered its ability to take over services.

In 2017, the Missanabie Cree First Nation started investigating taking operational control of the line.

Canadian National announced its intent in July 2020 to sell off non-core lines in the Upper Midwest as part of a rationalization programme, all of which were previously part of the Wisconsin Central system. In December 2021, the sale of the former Algoma Central lines along with CN trackage in Wisconsin and Michigan was approved by the Surface Transportation Board.

=== Watco purchase ===
In March 2021, Watco announced that it would acquire the Algoma Central from Canadian National, along with the Wisconsin lines, sale of the latter being subject to final approval by the United States Surface Transportation Board. Simultaneously, Watco committed to a continuance of the Agawa Canyon Tour Train, as well as signing a memorandum of understanding with the Missanabie Cree First Nation regarding a potential partnership. On April 20, the Missanabie Cree First Nation, N1 Strategy Inc. and The Machine Shop also signed a memorandum of understanding around logistics and operations of a resurrected tourist train. The purchase closed in 2022, with Watco operating under the name Agawa Canyon Railroad up to Oba, with Canadian National retaining the line from Oba to Hearst.

== Tourism ==
=== Agawa Canyon Tour Train ===
In the 1960s, the railway began to promote the natural beauty of the District of Algoma to tourists, especially the Agawa Canyon, a canyon carved by the Agawa River, located 114 rail miles (183 km) north of Sault Ste. Marie, and not accessible by road. The Algoma Central developed a tourist stopover here and it proved to be a great success for the railway. Owing to the popularity of the Agawa Canyon excursions, the Algoma Central ran the longest passenger trains in North America, often up to 20 to 24 cars long. During the 1970s and 1980s, around 100,000 people per year visited Agawa Canyon.

The Agawa Canyon Tour Train has continued to operate as a separate entity since 2015. The 2020 season of the Agawa Canyon tour train was cancelled due to the ongoing COVID-19 pandemic. During 2023 the tour train runs from early August to mid-October.

=== Moments of Algoma Group of Seven ===
In 2015, White Pine Pictures released the award-winning documentary film Painted Land: in Search of the Group of Seven which was shot along the rail corridor. In 2016 the Moments of Algoma project was launched by the Algoma Kinniwabi Travel Association, inviting tourists to follow the Group of Seven's travels, experiences and expressions of the region. The driving tour begins in Bruce Mines and follows the shoreline of Lake Huron and Lake Superior as far as Nipigon. Rail passengers will find more interpretive Installations in Agawa Canyon and at the train station in Sault Ste. Marie.

== In popular culture ==
The railway is the subject of the song "Algoma Central 69" by Stompin' Tom Connors.

The Agawa Canyon Tour Train has continued to operate as a separate entity since 2015.

== Railway points and sidings ==
Named railway points and sidings are listed from south to north.

Name	Location	Coordinates	Elevation	Siding	Notes
Odena					
Heyden					
Northland					
Goulais					
Wabos					
Archigan					
Ogidaki					
Mashkode					
Mekatina					
Summit	Batchewana, Ontario	47°08'46.0"N 84°11'13.1"W			
Batchewana					
Regent					
Hubert					
Frater					
Canyon					
Eton					
Agawa					A Japanese author AGAWA Hiroyuki (1920 - 2015) described his visit to this station in "南蛮阿房列車 (1977, JP only)."
Taber					
Perry					
Limer					
Hawk Junction					Yard
Alden					
Goudreau					
Wanda					
Franz				siding	Junction with the Canadian Pacific Kansas City mainline and connection to the Via Rail Sudbury–White River train
Scully					
Hilda					
Mosher					
Dana					
Langdon					
Oba		49°03′33″N 84°06′14″W		siding	Junction with the Canadian National Railway mainline and the connection to the Via Rail The Canadian train
Norris	Franz township	49°11′00″N 84°05′00″W	316 metres (1,037 ft)	no siding	Former railway point. Removed from official named points in 1978.
Kennedy	Talbott township	49°15′00″N 84°03′00″W	317 metres (1,040 ft)	no siding	Former railway point. Removed from official named points in 1978.
Hale					
Boon	Templeton township	49°22′41″N 83°57′07″W	308 metres (1,010 ft)	no siding	
Horsey					
Border between Unorganized North Algoma District and Unorganized North Cochrane District
Mead					
Coppell					
Stavert	community of Jogues				
Wyborn	Town of Hearst				

== See also ==
- Algoma Eastern Railway
- Huron Central Railway
- List of Ontario railways
