= Agawa River =

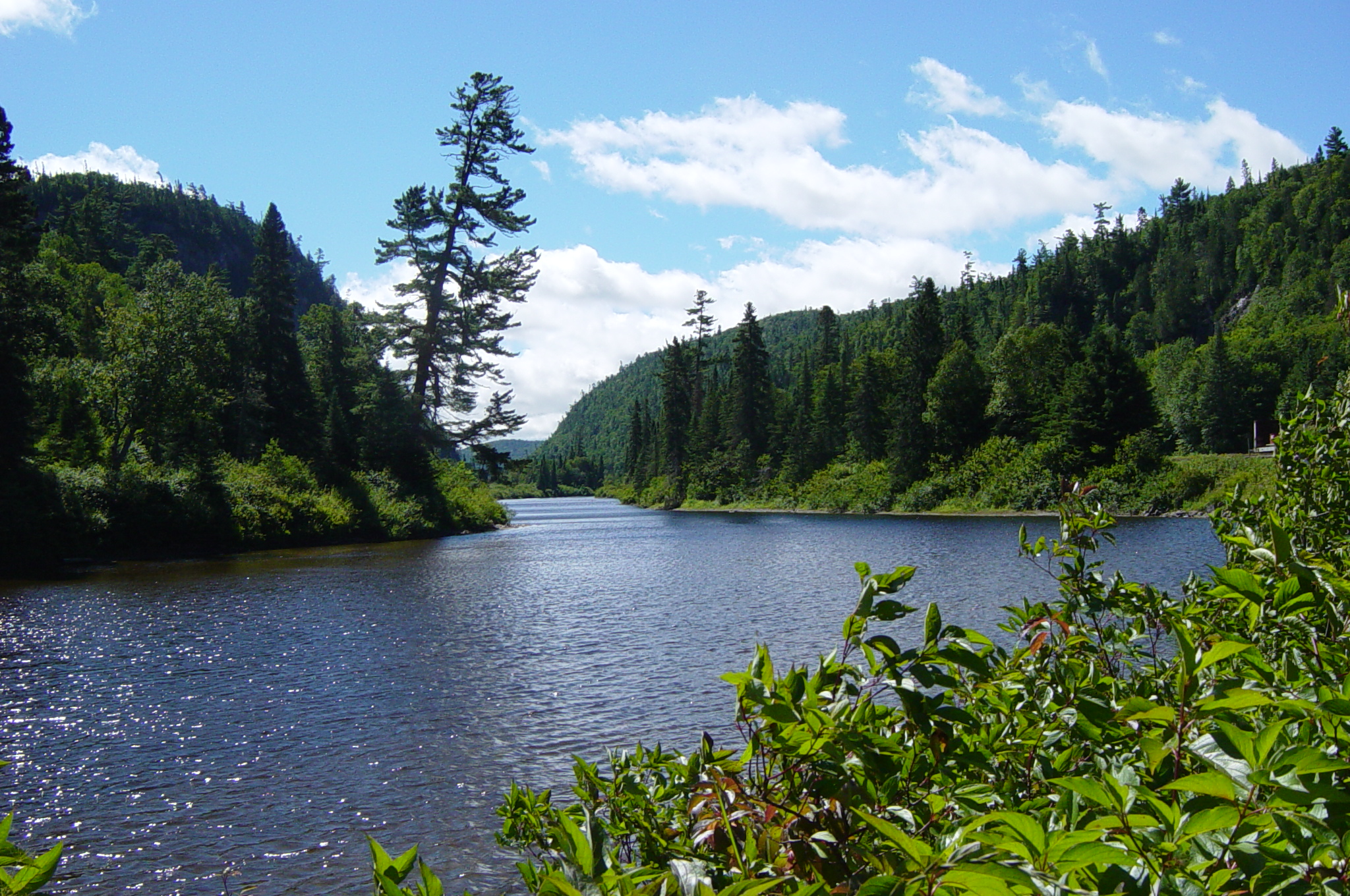

- Location of the mouth of the Agawa River in Ontario. Agawa River (Canada)
- Etymology: "sheltered place" in Ojibwe
- Native name: Aagawaa-ziibi (Ojibwe)

Location
- Country: Canada
- Province: Ontario
- District: Algoma

Physical characteristics
- Source: Agawa Lake
  - coordinates: 47°50′25″N 84°14′35″W
  - elevation: 435 m (1,427 ft)
- Mouth: Lake Superior
  - location: Agawa Bay
  - coordinates: 47°21′05″N 84°38′14″W
  - elevation: 180 m (590 ft)

Basin features
- Tributaries
  - left: Little Agawa River, Eleven Mile Creek, Blackspruce Creek, Weichel Creek, Parch Creek, Regan River, Sane Creek

The Agawa River is a river in Algoma District, Ontario, Canada which empties into Agawa Bay on Lake Superior at the community of Agawa Bay, south of Wawa, Ontario.

== Economy ==
The Algoma Central Railway runs an excursion train which leaves Sault Ste. Marie, Ontario and travels through the Agawa Canyon. Agawa Bay and the lower parts of the river are located in Lake Superior Provincial Park.

== See also ==
- List of Ontario rivers
