= Lake Superior Coastal Trail =

Wilderness hiking trail on Lake Superior, Canada

Coordinates: 47.33569°N 84.61695°W

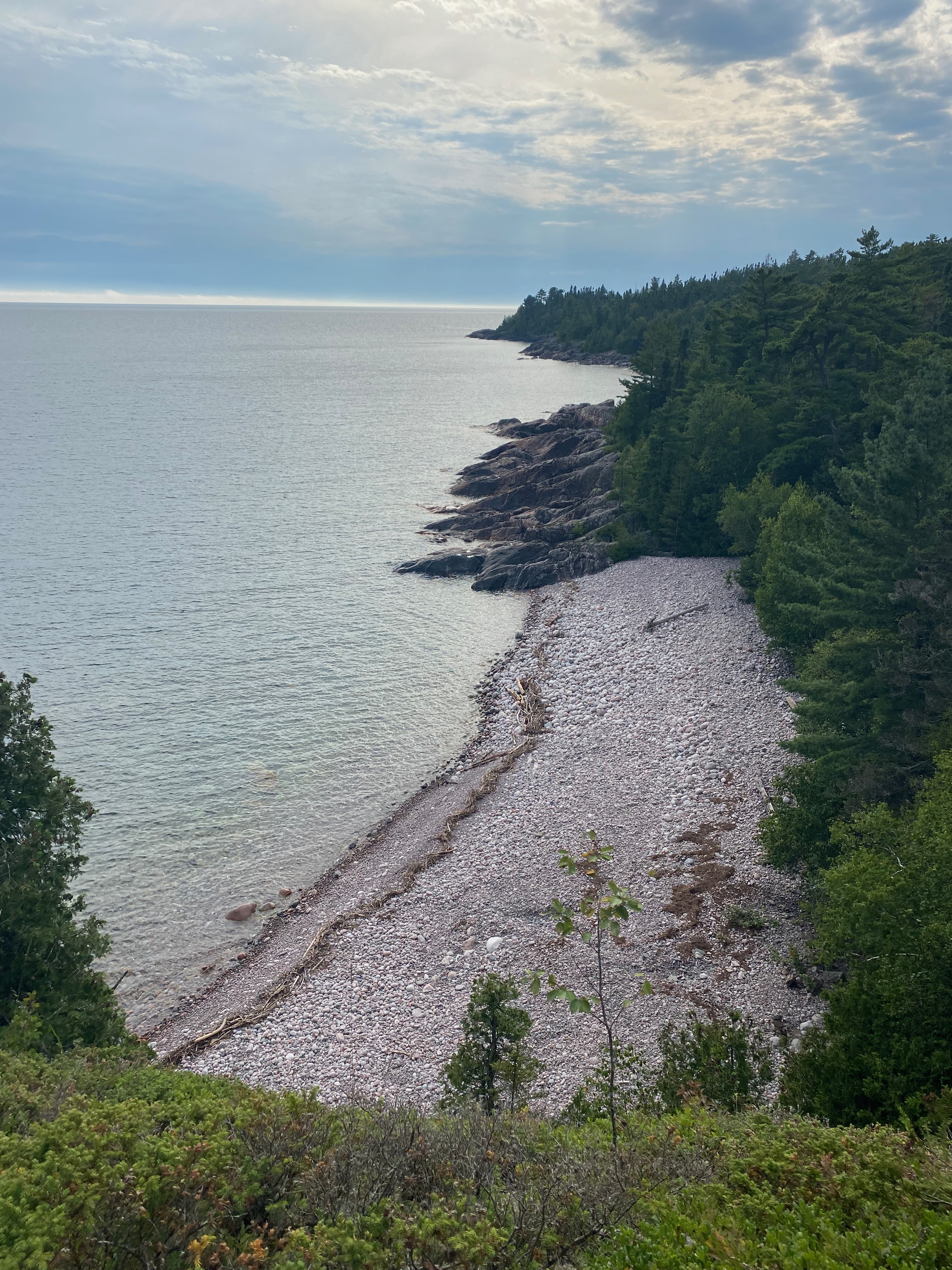
- Coastal section of the trail North of Buckshot Creek
- Length: 65 km (40 mi)
- Location: Ontario, Canada
- Trailheads: Agawa Bay; Gargantua Bay; Chalfant Cove
- Use: Hiking
- Elevation gain/loss: 1,618 m (5,308 ft)
- Difficulty: Hard
- Season: May to October
- Sights: Lake Superior, Canadian Shield

The Lake Superior Coastal Trail is a rugged 65-kilometre (40 mi) backcountry hiking trail located within Lake Superior Provincial Park along the northeastern coast of Lake Superior in Ontario, Canada. The trail stretches from Chalfant Cove in the North to Agawa Bay in the south, and is traversable only by foot, though most of the trail's coastal route and its backcountry campsites can be enjoyed by kayakers as well.

== Hiking and logistics ==
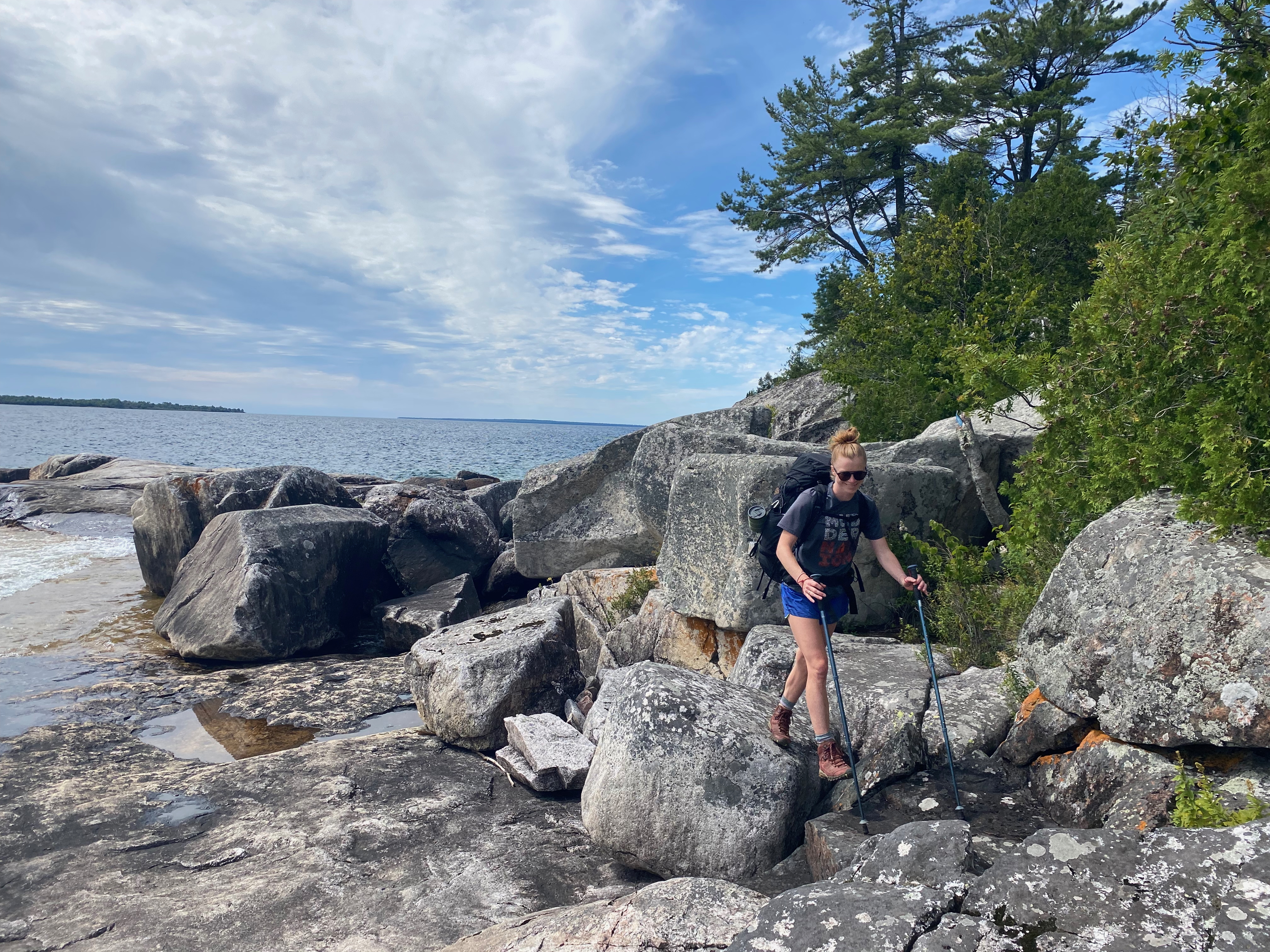
Typical rocky terrain along the coastal trail, requiring scrambling and route finding

Sections of the trail can be accessed for day hikes, but completing the trail in its entirety requires five to seven days of backpacking and backcountry camping. Camping permits are required from Ontario Parks and can be obtained on the Ontario Parks website or at the Agawa Bay Visitor Centre. The trail is marked by blue blazes on trees, rock cairns in coastal sections, and metal signage near roadways and frontcountry access points. Many backcountry campsites, requiring advanced reservation, are available at regular intervals along the trail. Many but not all feature a fire pit, a thunderbox, or a bear bin. All feature direct access to Lake Superior for water purification and swimming.

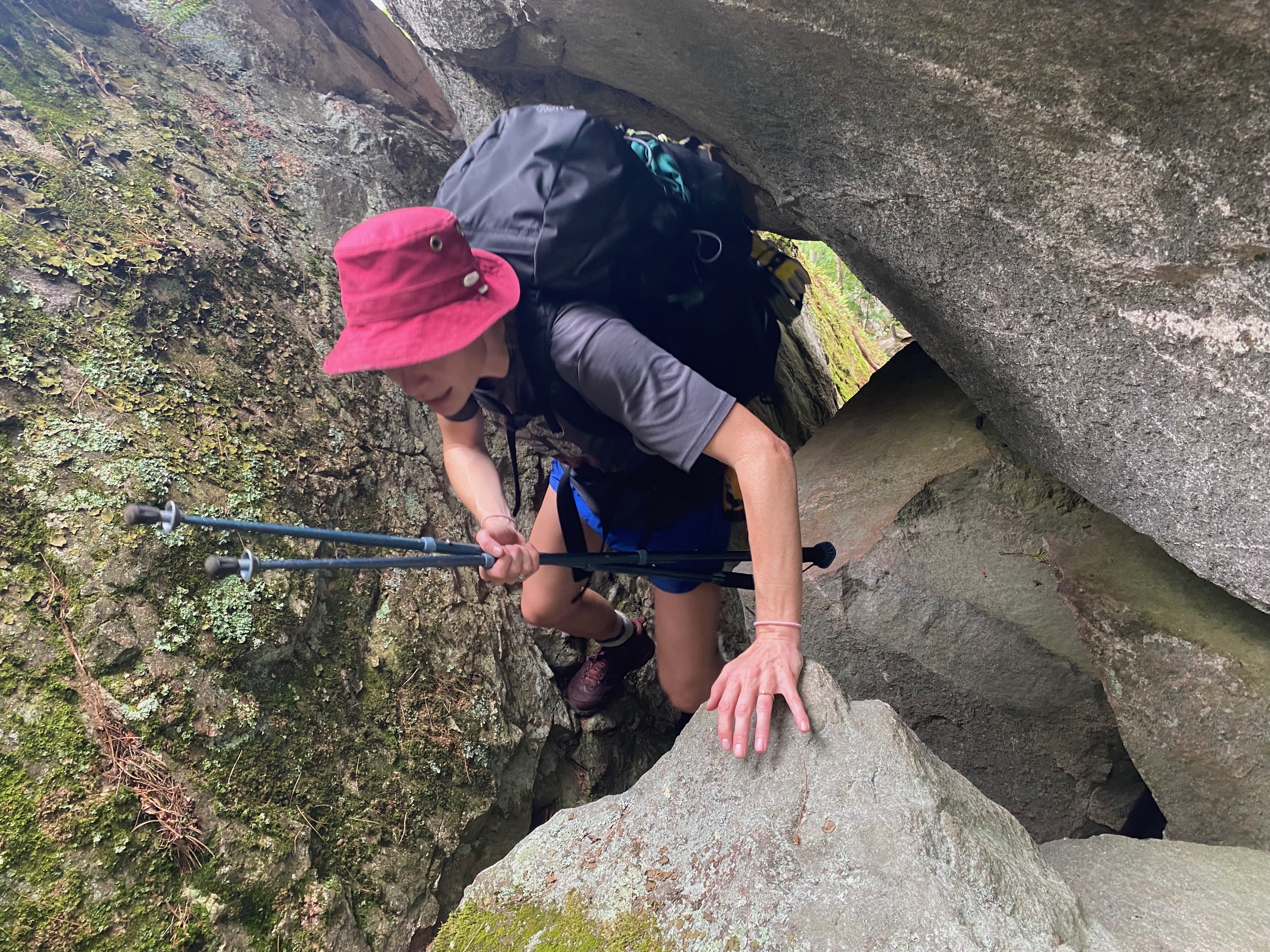
Cave sections on the trail south of Agawa Point

The trail can be accessed by paved road at several points in the southern half. In the northern half there is one 14 km (8.7 mi) dirt access road (traversable for most cars) to Gargantua Bay. There is no road access to the northern terminus at Chalfant Cove. Hikers wishing to complete the full 65 km (40 mi) trail will need to either complete the section between Gargantua Bay and Chalfant Cove in both directions (adding 10 km) or arrange a water taxi to or from Chalfant Cove. Rugged areas of the coast with exposed bedrock often require scrambling. Hiking poles with rubberized tips for traction on rocks are highly recommended. Overall, the trail is quite strenuous and fit hikers should expect to travel less than 2 km/h (1.2 mph) in many sections due to technical terrain.

== Points of interest ==
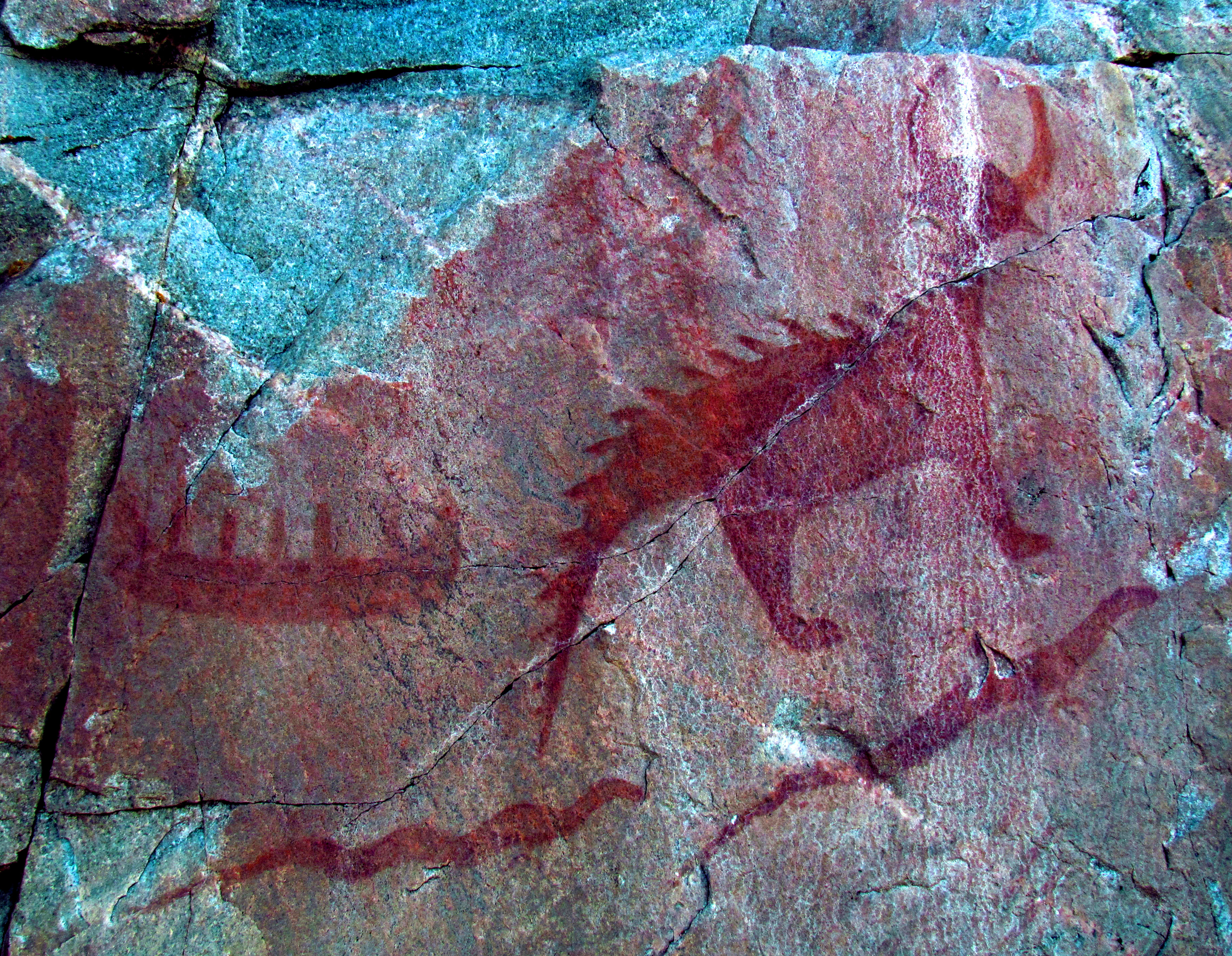
Ojibwe Pictographs at Agawa Rock

The trail features widely varied beaches, rocky coastlines, forests, cave systems, and dramatic cliffs. Many features of Lake Superior's geology are on display, including 2.6 billion year-old granite and gneiss of the Canadian Shield interwoven and overlain by volcanic basalt in dike and sill structures the hiker passes over, through, and under. The beaches vary from fine white sand to smoothly polished multi-coloured rocks of varying sizes. There are forests of both the Great Lakes–St. Lawrence Lowlands and Boreal variety. At Agawa Rock, near the mouth of the Agawa River, there are pictographs created by the early Ojibwe people of the region, estimated to be 150-400 years old.
