= Labonte =

Labonte or Labonté is a surname. Notable people with the surname include:

- Aaron Labonte (born 1983), English professional footballer
- Benoît Labonté (born 1959), city councillor with the Vision Montréal party in Montreal, Quebec, Canada
- Bobby Labonte (born 1964), American race car driver
- Catherine Labonté, Canadian glass artist
- Charline Labonté (born 1982), women's ice hockey player
- Jean Labonté (born 1969), Canadian sledge hockey player
- Julie Labonté (born 1990), Canadian track and field athlete
- Justin Labonte (born 1981), former NASCAR Busch Series driver
- Philip Labonte (born 1975), American musician, lead singer of the American metalcore band All That Remains
- Richard Labonté (born 1949), Canadian writer and editor
- Robert LaBonte, American curler
- Terry Labonte (born 1956), Retired NASCAR driver and two-time NASCAR Winston Cup and IROC champion
- Veronique Labonte (born 1980), Canadian road cyclist
- Vincent Labonté (born 1987), Mauritian football player

== See also ==
- Labonte Motorsports, former part-time Winston Cup team and full-time Busch Series team
