= Catherine Labonté =

Canadian glass artist

- Born: Montreal, Quebec
- Education: Cégep du Vieux Montréal
- Style: glass art
- Awards: Niche Award 2007; Montréal's François-Houdé Award 2008; Guest artist Corning Museum of Glass 2016 - 2018

Catherine Labonté is a Canadian glass artist. Her work appears in the Corning Museum of Glass, and in 2007 she received a Niche Award.

== Biography ==
Labonté is from Montreal, Quebec. When she was young, Labonté sketched pictures of the cartoon cat Garfield, and started glassblowing as a way to create object based on her drawings. She studied glasswork at Cégep du Vieux Montréal, and graduated with a fine art diploma in 2001, and a glass art diploma in 2002.

Labonté received a 2007 Niche Award in the US for her work and Montréal's François-Houdé Award in 2008. Labonté has been a guest artist at the Corning Museum of Glass in 2016, 2017, and 2018.
