= Lake Superior Provincial Park =

Provincial park in Ontario, Canada

- IUCN category II (national park)
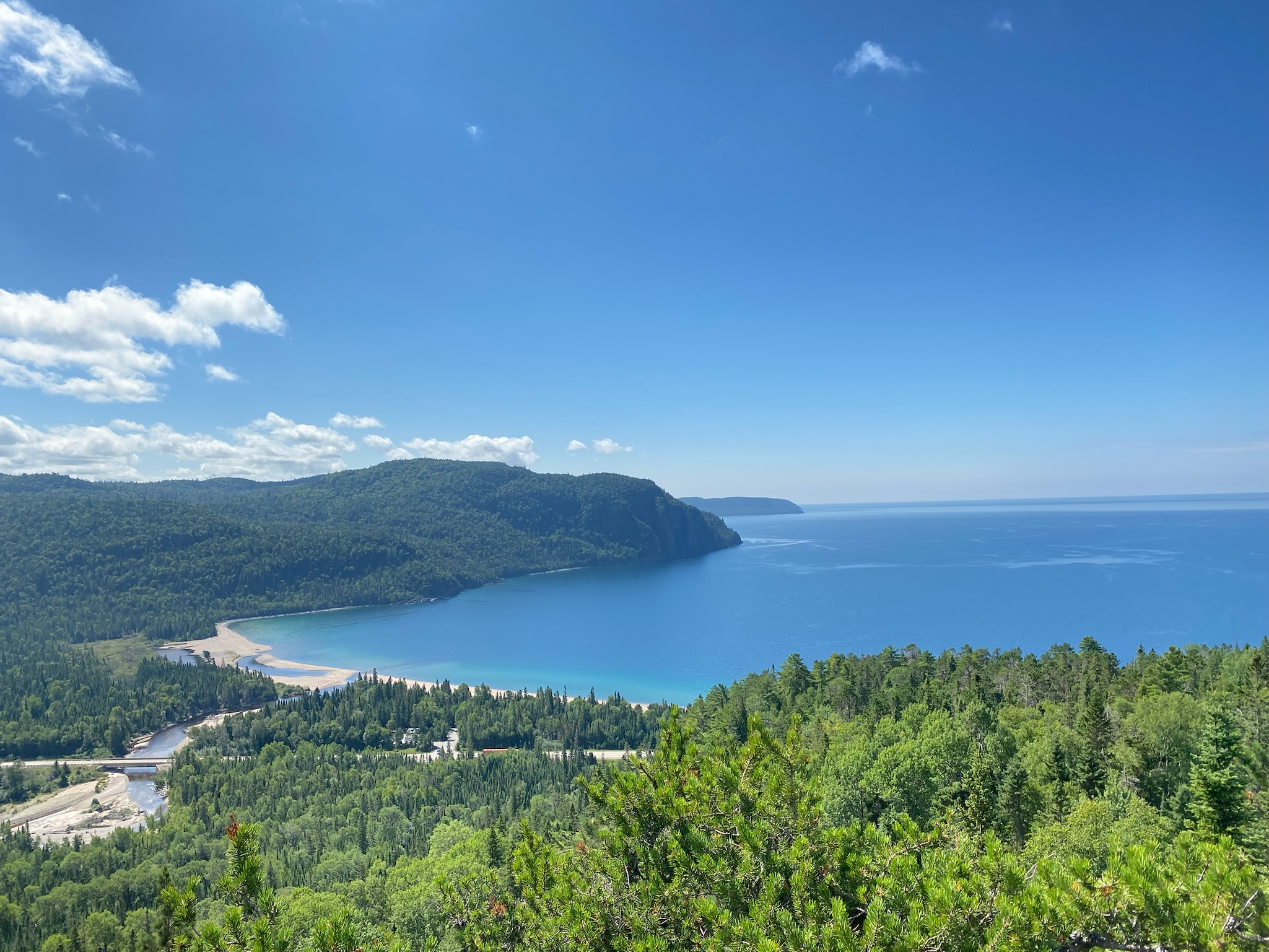
- Old Woman Bay

- Location within Ontario
- Interactive map of Lake Superior Provincial Park
- Location: Algoma District, Ontario, Canada
- Nearest city: Wawa
- Coordinates: 47°35′48″N 84°44′29″W
- Area: 155,646 ha (600.95 sq mi)
- Established: 1944
- Visitors: 75,189 (in 2022)
- Governing body: Ontario Parks
- Website: www.ontarioparks.com/park/lakesuperior

Lake Superior Provincial Park is one of the largest provincial parks in Ontario, covering about 1,550 square kilometres (600 sq mi) along the northeastern shores of Lake Superior between Sault Ste. Marie and Wawa in Algoma District in Northeastern Ontario, Canada. Ontario Highway 17 (at this point part of the Trans-Canada Highway) runs through the park. When the park was established by Ontario in 1944, there was no road access.

== History ==
Traces of ancient volcanic activity can be seen in rock outcrops near Red Rock Lake and several other sites. For more than 2000 years, this was long an area of occupation by various cultures of indigenous peoples. The oldest artifacts found here date to approximately 500 BC.

At Agawa Rock, near the mouth of the Agawa River, there are pictographs created by the early Ojibwe people of this region. The figures are painted on the rock with a mixture of powdered hematite and animal fats and are estimated to be 150–400 years old. The records are visual representations of both historical events and legendary figures.

The first written description of these pictographs was published in 1851 by American ethnologist, Henry Rowe Schoolcraft. As United States Indian agent in Sault Ste. Marie, he conducted extensive studies about the Ojibwe people, aided by his wife Jane Johnston Schoolcraft, who was half-Ojibwe and the daughter of a major fur trader in the city.

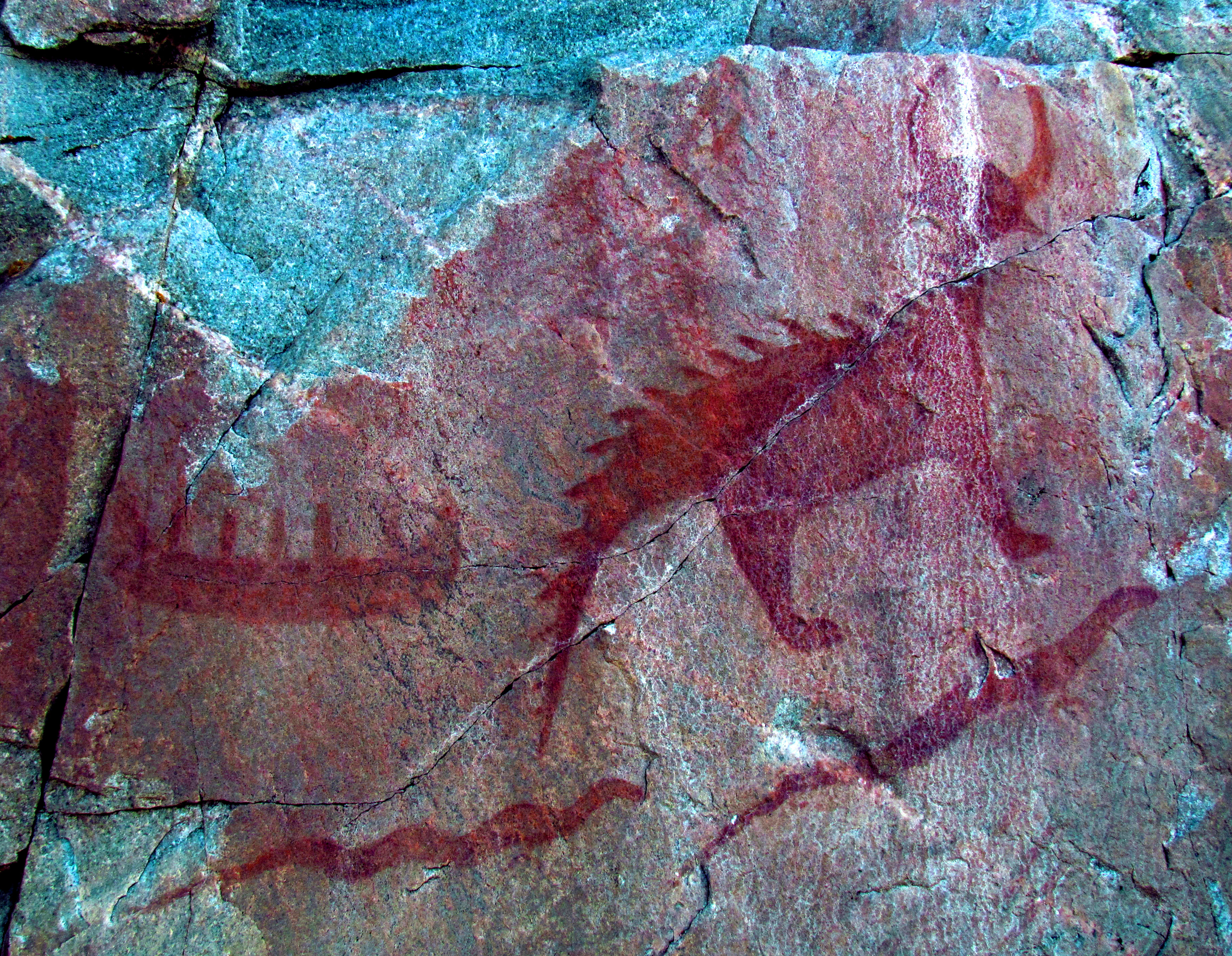
Pictographs at Agawa Rock. This is said to be Mishibizhiw, or Great Lynx, who controlled Lake Superior. Below are two giant serpents known as Mishi-ginebikoog in the Ojibwe language.

While the Ojibwe were forced to cede their lands to the Canadian government under an 1850 Treaty in exchange for reserves and annuities, they have preserved hunting and fishing rights to former territory. In the 1940s, the Lake Superior Provincial Park was established, and it took over an Ojibwe fishing village known as Nanabozhung within the boundaries.

From the late 20th century, the Batchewana First Nation, whose traditional territory included the village, also known as Gargantua Harbour, had long agitated to regain road access to the village. One of its reserves is Rankin Location 15D in Ontario and members have fished at Gargantua Harbour. In 2007 some 200 members, led by Chief Dean Sayers, restored a road to the village along a park trail, without a work permit. After trying to negotiate with the band, the Ministry of Natural Resources (MNR) filed charges against it in 2008, saying that the First Nation had damaged park property.

The First Nation contended this was a traditional fishing and ceremonial area and construction of the road was necessary to exercise their Treaty rights. In March 2015 Justice Logan dismissed all but one of the eleven counts in the case. In his decision, Logan upheld that a Treaty right existed for the Batchewana First Nation to use Gargantua Harbour for commercial fishing and agreed that the road was necessary to get to the shore. He upheld one charge against Sayers and the Band for obstruction, requiring a fine to be paid.

== Climate ==
Lake Superior Provincial Park has a humid continental climate (Köppen climate classification Dfb) that is greatly moderated by its location on Lake Superior. Weather in the Park is highly variable depending on the location. Along the shore of Lake Superior, summer temperatures are significantly cooler than inland locations. During the winter, areas along Lake Superior are considerably milder than inland.

Winters in Lake Superior Provincial Park are very cold with significant snowfall. February is the coldest month in Lake Superior provincial Park with an average temperature of −12.5 °C (9 °F). Being located on the eastern shore of Lake Superior, snowfall is abundant during winter months. The park receives an average of 432 centimetres (170 in) annually.

Spring is a very short transition season in Lake Superior Provincial Park with snow often remaining on the ground into May.

Summers in Lake Superior Provincial Park are often cool due to the cold winds off Lake Superior. Summer is often slow to start due to the water on Lake Superior being so cold during May and June. During June and July, water temperatures are usually below 15 °C (59 °F) and as a result fog is frequent. August is the warmest month with an average high of 20 °C (68 °F). August is when water temperatures on Lake Superior peak, with an average maximum of 19 °C (66 °F).

Climate data for Agawa Bay
Month	Jan	Feb	Mar	Apr	May	Jun	Jul	Aug	Sep	Oct	Nov	Dec	Year
Mean daily maximum °C (°F)	−7 (19)	−7 (19)	−1 (30)	5 (41)	14 (57)	19 (66)	20 (68)	20 (68)	16 (61)	10 (50)	3 (37)	−4 (25)	7 (45)
Daily mean °C (°F)	−12 (10)	−12.5 (9.5)	−6 (21)	0.5 (32.9)	8.5 (47.3)	14 (57)	15.5 (59.9)	16 (61)	12 (54)	6.5 (43.7)	0 (32)	−8.5 (16.7)	2.8 (37.1)
Mean daily minimum °C (°F)	−17 (1)	−18 (0)	−11 (12)	−4 (25)	3 (37)	9 (48)	11 (52)	12 (54)	8 (46)	3 (37)	−3 (27)	−13 (9)	−2 (29)
Average rainfall mm (inches)	0 (0)	0 (0)	0 (0)	40 (1.6)	81 (3.2)	96 (3.8)	117 (4.6)	85 (3.3)	121 (4.8)	106 (4.2)	47 (1.9)	0 (0)	693 (27.4)
Average snowfall cm (inches)	102 (40)	88 (35)	52 (20)	36 (14)	2 (0.8)	0.0 (0.0)	0.0 (0.0)	0.0 (0.0)	0.0 (0.0)	2 (0.8)	44 (17)	106 (42)	432 (169.6)
Average precipitation days (≥ 0.2 mm)	11	8	9	9	10	11	11	10	12	13	14	13	131
Average relative humidity (%)	81	78	76	73	71	76	82	83	83	83	84	85	80
Source: Temperature, and precipitation (rain/snow) from The Weather Network, relative humidity, wind chill, humidex, and sunshine data from weatherstats.ca based on Environment and Climate Change Canada data, UV indices from World Weather Online.

== Activities ==
=== Campgrounds ===
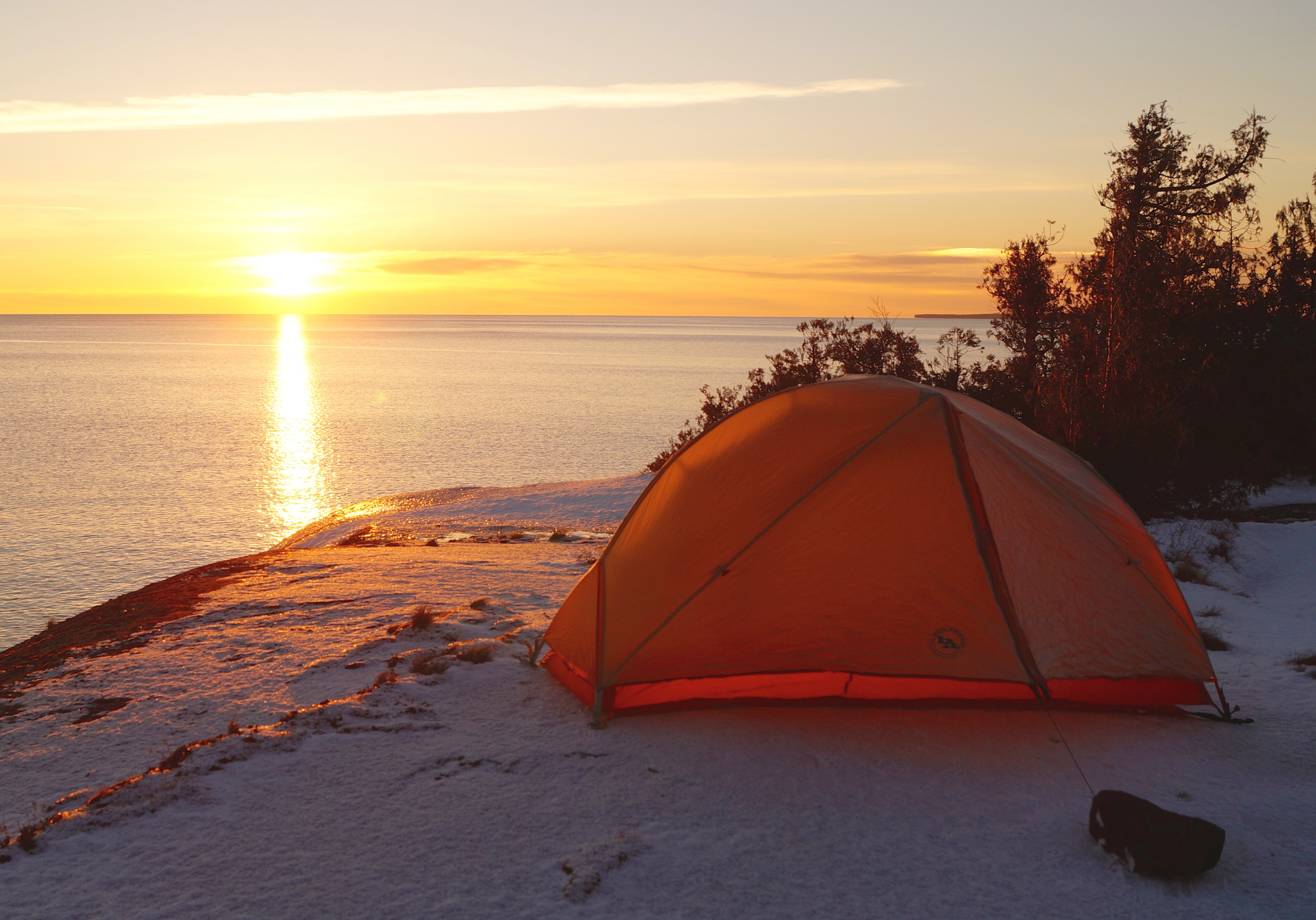
Camping at Lake Superior Provincial Park

==== Agawa Bay ====
Agawa Bay has 152 campsites. There are two comfort stations located in the campground equipped with showers, laundry facilities and flush toilets. An amphitheatre is located in the campground, and presentations here by park staff are a common occurrence in the summer months. All the campsites are within walking distance to Lake Superior. There is a premium for campsites located beside the beach. Permits are obtained at the Agawa Bay gatehouse. Firewood and ice is available for purchase at the Agawa Bay gatehouse.

Agawa Bay is also the location of the park's visitor centre where information can be obtained about the park and surrounding areas. There are washrooms and a gift shop open to the public from May through September. The visitor centre has a display area orchestrating the history of the park and the influence that Lake Superior Park had on the fur trade, the Group of Seven artists and shipwrecks in the region. There are trailer storage opportunities available, but arrangements must be made with senior staff located in the northern part of the park at the park office. The visitor centre has received a number of awards for its design.

==== Crescent Lake ====
Crescent Lake (now closed) had 46 campsites and was located approximately 2 kilometres off of Highway 17 beside Crescent Lake.

==== Rabbit Blanket Lake ====
Rabbit Blanket Lake has 60 campsites. There is one comfort station located within the campground equipped with showers, laundry facilities and flush toilets. The campground is located beside Rabbit Blanket Lake. Firewood and ice can be purchased at the Rabbit Blanket gatehouse or the park office.

=== Lake Superior Coastal Trail ===
The Lake Superior Coastal Trail is a rugged 65 km backpacking trail that takes 5 to 7 days to complete while backcountry camping, entirely within the park.

== Ecology ==
=== Forests ===
Due to its size and location, the park lies in both the Eastern forest-boreal transition ecoregion and the Central Canadian Shield forests region. Its rugged landscape is wooded with a mix of coniferous and deciduous trees such as pine, maples and birch. Sugar maple dominates many forests in the southern two-thirds of the park.

=== Topography ===
The predominantly rocky coastline is interrupted by sandy beaches in a few locations. The park is situated within the Great Canadian Shield, dominated by exposed rocks or a thin layer of soil over rock.

=== Fauna ===
The park supports a large moose (Alces alces) population. The best time for viewing moose is in the months of April, May, and June when the spring melt occurs. Other large animals found in the park include:

- White-tailed deer (Odocoileus virginianus)
- Black bear (Ursus americanus)
- Grey wolf (Canis lupus)

During the summer months, the park provides habitat for warblers and other birds of the northern forests.

=== Lakes and rivers ===
In addition to its namesake, the park has numerous smaller lakes in its interior. A number of rivers also flow from the park's interior:

- Agawa River
- Baldhead River
- Coldwater River
- Gargantua River
- Old Woman River
- Red Rock River
- Sand River
- Speckled Trout Creek

Several waterfalls on these rivers can be seen from the road or reached via hiking trails.
