= Station Mall =

- Coordinates: 46.512°N 84.339°W
- Address: 293 Bay Street; Sault Ste. Marie, Ontario; P6A 1X3
- Opened: October 31, 1973
- Developer: Algoma Central Railway
- Manager: CBRE
- Owner: SM International Holdings Ltd.
- Num. of stores: 97
- Num. of anchor tenants: 4
- Floor area: 555,000 square feet (51,600 m^{2})
- Parking: +2,000
- Website: thestationmall.com

The Station Mall is a shopping mall located on the downtown Sault Ste. Marie waterfront, approximately a kilometre from the Sault Ste. Marie International Bridge to the United States.

With 97 stores and 555,000 square feet (51,600 m^{2}) of retail space, it is the second largest shopping mall in Northern Ontario by area, trailing the New Sudbury Centre in Greater Sudbury. Built in 1973, the mall has undergone two major expansions and several renovations. Its major tenants include the 32,000 square feet (3,000 m^{2}) Galaxy Cinemas movie theatre complex.

The mall was named for its proximity to Sault Ste. Marie railway station which was located in the northern section of the mall's parking lot until 2020.

== History ==
The idea of a shopping mall on Sault Ste. Marie's waterfront was first proposed by Algoma Central Railway in October 1970 as part of an ambitious $30 million plan to develop its 53.8 acre property along the St. Marys River. The plan presented to city council envisioned a 247,000 square foot enclosed shopping mall with a large department store, a grocery store as well as smaller retailers. The mall would be connected by covered walkways to other proposed plan features.

Among the other features the railway proposed for its property bordered by Bay Street to the north, Gore Street to the west, and Elgin Street to the east were a new nine-story city hall, a civic square, a hotel, a luxury apartment and office complex and apartments geared to lower and medium incomes. The plan also proposed construction of a new street along the waterfront to service the site - what would become St. Marys River Drive.

=== Phase I (1973) ===
Station Mall opened on October 31, 1973 with 284,000 square feet of retail space and 45 tenants, including a two-story Sears department store and Dominion Food Stores as its anchors. Other retailers when the mall opened in 1973 included Lakeshore Drug Mart, Peoples Jewelers, Lighting Unlimited, Davis II men's wear, Big Steel, Dalmys, Fairweather, Penningtons, Laura Secord Candies, Coles - The Book People, Melody Lane Record Shop, The Leather Touch, Kinney Shoes, Dolomity Shoes, Tip Top Stores, Happy Hour Card 'n Party Shop, and the Loon's Nest. The 400-seat Station Cinema opened with the mall, as did J.B.'s Big Boy Family Restaurant. The original "Pufferbelly" food court included space for a delicatessen and 10 snack bars. A departure from downtown retailers at the time, the mall advertised free parking for 1,800 cars and a climate-controlled shopping experience.

The original construction was part of a $30 million development of the Algoma Central Railway's Bay Street property, which also included the construction of a 200-room hotel near the mall, originally occupied by Holiday Inn.

The original building was designed by James A. Murray, Architects and built by Eastern Construction Co. Ltd.

The mall underwent two expansions in 16 years, in 1981 and 1989, adding more than 200,000 square feet of additional retail space.

=== Phase II expansion (1981) ===
Before the mall had even opened, plans were already underway for a 150,000 square feet expansion to add another department store, 20 additional retail stores, a second cinema, a third large restaurant as well as parking for 200 additional cars.

The $10 million Phase II expansion opened on August 19, 1981. It added 198,000 square feet to the western end of the mall, including 35 new retailers, bringing the total number of tenants to 70. The expansion increased the size of the food court to 150 seats, in addition to a Smitty's Pancake House franchise.

Part of the expansion was a 57,000 square foot Zellers department store as a second anchor opposite Sears on the mall's eastern end. Among the other retailers that opened as part of Phase II were Garfield Cards, Noah's Ark pet shop, The Frame Centre, Savoy's Jewellers, Jeans n' Such, Epic Bookstore, The Treasure Cove, Agnew Shoes, Station Mall Drugmart, Fancy Linens and Gifts, The Kiddie Kobbler, People's Jewellers, Algoma Steelworkers Credit Union, Bank of Nova Scotia, Caravan, Japan Camera Centre, Irene Hill Ladies Wear, Mister Keys, Dexter Shoes, Athletes World, Suzy Shier and Finishing Touch II. The first phase of the mall was subsequently redecorated to integrate with that of Phase II.

The mall's owner, Algocen Realty Holdings said the mall provided 1,000 jobs, including 300 new full-time and 450 part-time jobs as a result of the expansion.

=== Phase III expansion (1989) ===
The mall's Phase III expansion cost $18 million. It continued the mall's westward growth, increasing its size by 100,000 square feet, making it the largest mall in Northern Ontario at the time.

Opening in the fall of 1989, the new phase brought the total number of stores, shops and restaurants to 115. Among the new or relocated stores in Phase III were Lady's a Champ/Frat House; Sam the Record Man; Footlocker; Rafters; CAA Travel; Pantorama; Cotton Ginny, Saan for Kids, Heels; Morse Jewellers; Serendipity Crafts; Live in Leather; and Beef n' Brand Restaurant.

=== 1995 roof collapse ===
At about 8:30 a.m. on 14 December 1995, the mall suffered a partial roof collapse near the fountain court entrance connecting Phases II and III. Although the mall was open at the time, stores were not yet open for business and there were no injuries. Two stores, Foot Locker and Hollywood Beauty Salon, as well as the mall's fountain, were directly damaged. Clean up of the mall took a month with mall owners conducting a complete structural audit as well. An investigation conducted by the Ontario Ministry of Labour found that the collapse resulted from improper welding of steel joists that had been stressed by several days of heavy snowfall.

No charges were laid as a result of the incident. The fact that John Kaldec, the engineer responsible building that part of the roof, was no longer working as an engineer and that his firm, Beta Engineering Consultants Limited had previously had its certificate of authorization rescinded contributed to the ministry's decision to not recommend further action. Kaldec and Beta Engineering would later be linked to the 2012 Algo Centre Mall collapse in Elliot Lake.

This section of the mall reopened in April 1996 as Carousel Court, featuring a 18-seat carousel constructed in Venice replacing the fountain which had been destroyed in the collapse.

=== 2000 renovation ===
In 2000, the 52,000-square-foot Galaxy Entertainment Complex was opened on the waterfront side of the mall. The complex included a 12-screen, 2,400 seat movie theatre. The mall underwent a major renovation project, adding large format stores and revamping the interior.

In 2011 a number of smaller stores combined to create space for a new Sport Chek location. As part of its acquisition of 39 Zellers stores, in September 2011, Walmart Canada announced that the Zellers location would become a Walmart Supercentre following renovations to be completed in 2012.

On November 25, 2013, Galaxy Cinemas downsized from 12 screens to seven in order to make room for H&M.

As a result of Sears Canada's bankruptcy, the Station Mall Sears store closed permanently in October 2017, leaving Coles, Lakeshore Drug Mart, Laura Secord and the Vacation Station as the only remaining original tenants of the mall.

In May 2019, Walmart announced that its store in the mall would close in June of that year. This left the mall without any major anchor stores.

=== 2024 renovation ===
Seven years after announcing plans to sell off all of its commercial real estate holdings, in July 2022 Algoma Central Corporation announced a deal to sell the mall to SM International Holdings Ltd., a Markham-based company for $30 million, consisting of $12 million in cash and the remainder as debt. In August 2023, a consulting firm working with the mall's owners announced a $60 million redevelopment plan, consisting of new retail stores, a 50,000 square foot "eatertainment complex" and a casual dining sports bar. This renovation was expected to be completed early in 2024.

On 18 Oct 2024, the mall added a Sephora outlet.

== Anchor tenants ==
- Galaxy Cinema (32,000 sq ft)
- Sport Chek (22,000 sq ft)
- H&M (18,000 sq ft)
- Dollarama (11,000 sq ft)
