= Divisional point =

In Canada and also in the United States, a divisional point (or division point) is a local operational headquarters for a railway. Divisional points are significant in railway maintenance of way operations. Especially historically, they could be the location of facilities and infrastructure such as a siding or junction, roundhouse and turntable, water tower, bunkhouse or hotel, coaling tower, passenger station, telegraph office, or freight shed. Stretches of railway line managed from a divisional point were known as divisions, and were further divided into segments known as subdivisions.

The logistics of steam locomotives required numerous facilities for reversing, servicing, and supplying water and fuel for passing trains. This required an on-site workforce, which in some cases led to the growth of railway towns.

Divisional points were historically significant in the westward colonization and development of Canada, supplanting the Hudson's Bay Company trading post in a number of cases as a focal point for economic activity and urbanization.

Technological changes, most significantly dieselization, led to a decline in the importance of divisional points and a reduction in the need for on-site crews, leading to some becoming ghost towns, while others survived due to economic diversification.

== Overview ==
In the coal and steam era, a divisional point would include such amenities as a substantial passenger station, freight and baggage sheds, a roundhouse, water tank, coaling and sanding facilities, and repair shops for locomotives and rolling stock.

== List of divisional points ==
In areas dominated by the railway, the choice of a town as a divisional point was typically pivotal in that town's growth. Many towns and cities across southern Canada are current or former divisional points. Examples include: Kamloops, British Columbia, Lucerne, British Columbia, Calgary, Alberta, Edmonton, Alberta, Jasper, Alberta, Melville, Saskatchewan, Winnipeg, Manitoba, Capreol, Ontario, Toronto, Ontario, Montreal, Quebec, McAdam, New Brunswick and Moncton, New Brunswick.
