= Hydro, Ontario =

Hydro
- Location of Hydro in Ontario
- Coordinates: 45°54′05″N 77°53′11″W
- Country: Canada
- Province: Ontario
- Region: Northeastern Ontario
- District: Nipissing
- Part: Nipissing, Unorganized South
- Elevation: 226 m (741 ft)
- Time zone: UTC-5 (Eastern Time Zone)
  - Summer (DST): UTC-4 (Eastern Time Zone)
- Postal code FSA: K0J
- Area codes: 705, 249

Hydro is an unincorporated place and former railway point in geographic Barron Township in the Unorganized South Part of Nipissing District in northeastern Ontario, Canada. Hydro is located within Algonquin Provincial Park on Grand Lake on the Barron River.

The railway point lies on the now abandoned Canadian National Railway Beachburg Subdivision, a section of track that was originally constructed as the Canadian Northern Railway main line, between Brawny to the west and Achray to the east, at a point where a still-operational Hydro One transmission line crossed the line.
