= Mink Lake, Nipissing District =

Mink Lake
- Location of Mink Lake in Ontario
- Coordinates: 46°03′24″N 78°45′52″W
- Country: Canada
- Province: Ontario
- Region: Northeastern Ontario
- District: Nipissing
- Part: Nipissing, Unorganized South
- Elevation: 329 m (1,079 ft)
- Time zone: UTC-5 (Eastern Time Zone)
  - Summer (DST): UTC-4 (Eastern Time Zone)
- Postal code FSA: K0J
- Area codes: 705, 249

Mink Lake is an unincorporated place and former railway point in geographic Pentland Township in the Unorganized South Part of Nipissing District in northeastern Ontario, Canada. Mink Lake is located within Algonquin Provincial Park at the eastern end of Mink Lake in the Amable du Fond River drainage basin.

It lies on the now abandoned Canadian National Railway Alderdale Subdivision, a section of track that was originally constructed as the Canadian Northern Railway main line, between Ascalon to the west and Daventry to the east.
