= Ascalon, Ontario =

Ascalon
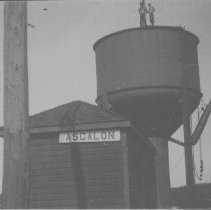
- Canadian National Railway Ascalon Station at Mink Lake, as seen in 1932.

- Location of Ascalon in Ontario
- Coordinates: 46°04′27″N 78°48′19″W
- Country: Canada
- Province: Ontario
- Region: Northeastern Ontario
- District: Nipissing
- Elevation: 324 m (1,063 ft)
- Time zone: UTC-5 (Eastern Time Zone)
  - Summer (DST): UTC-4 (Eastern Time Zone)
- Postal code FSA: K0J
- Area codes: 705, 249

Ascalon is an unincorporated place and former railway point in geographic Pentland Township in the Unorganized South Part of Nipissing District in northeastern Ontario, Canada. Ascalon is located within Algonquin Provincial Park at the northwestern end of Mink Lake in the Amable du Fond River drainage basin.

It lies on the now-abandoned Canadian National Railway Alderdale Subdivision, a section of track that was originally constructed as the Canadian Northern Railway main line, between Kiosk to the west and Mink Lake to the east.
