= Indian River (Muskrat River watershed) =

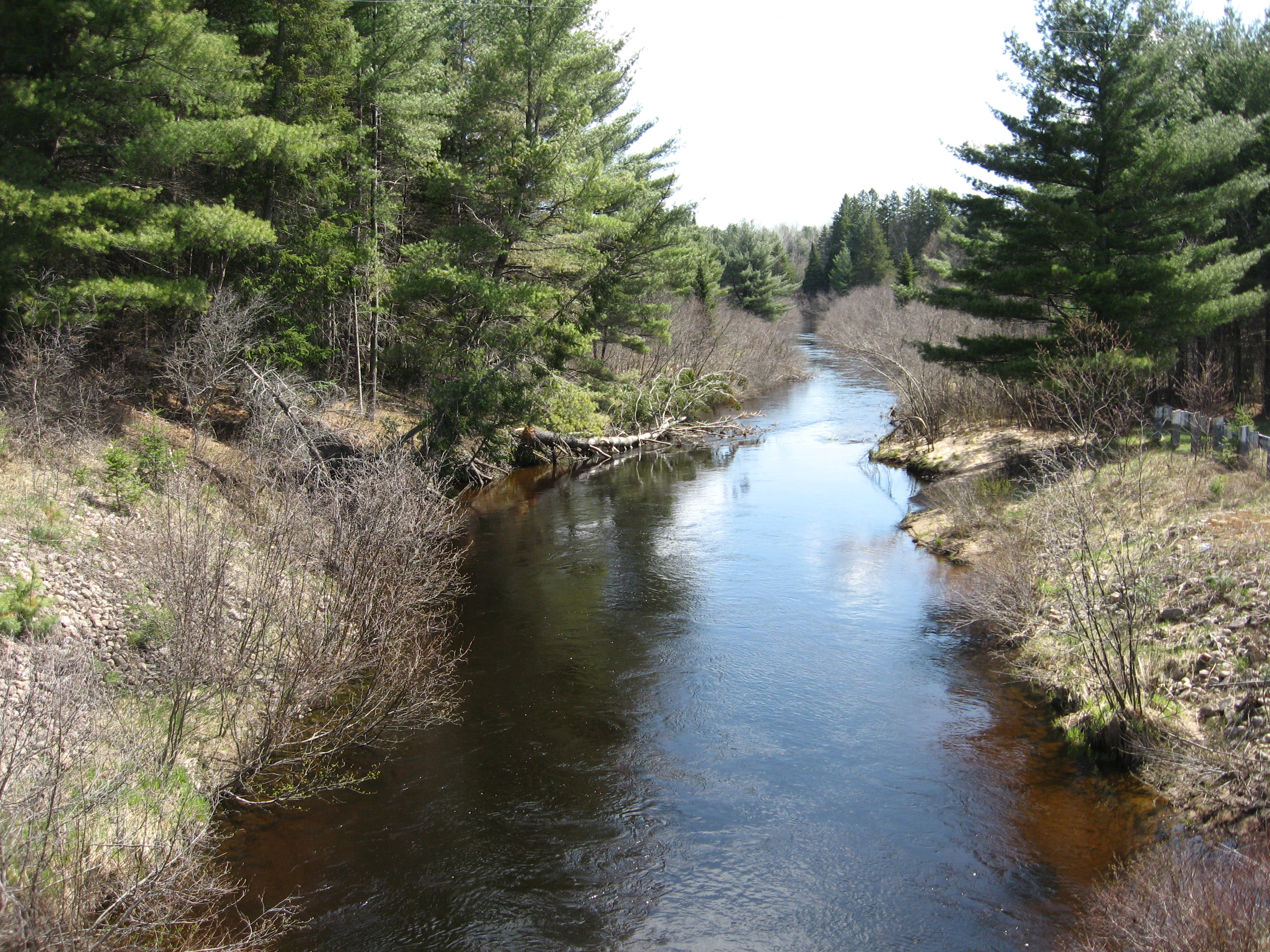
- Indian River near Pembroke

- Location of the mouth of the river in Ontario

Location
- Country: Canada
- Province: Ontario
- Regions: Eastern Ontario; Northeastern Ontario
- County/District: Renfrew County; Nipissing District

Physical characteristics
- Source: unnamed lake
  - location: Master Township, Nipissing District
  - coordinates: 45°47′17″N 77°37′41″W
  - elevation: 362 m (1,188 ft)
- Mouth: Muskrat River
  - location: Pembroke, Renfrew County
  - coordinates: 45°48′54″N 77°06′55″W
  - elevation: 111 m (364 ft)

Basin features
- River system: Saint Lawrence River drainage basin

The Indian River is a river in Renfrew County and Nipissing District in Eastern and Northeastern Ontario, Canada. It is in the Saint Lawrence River drainage basin, and is a left tributary of the Muskrat River.

== Course ==
The river begins at an unnamed lake in the southeast corner of Algonquin Provincial Park, in geographic Master Township in the Unorganized South Part of Nipissing District. It flows north, then turns southeast at the point where it takes in the left tributary Walker Creek, 500 metres (1,640 ft) from the railway point of Kathmore. From this point, the river valley is used as the route of the now abandoned Canadian National Railway Beachburg Subdivision, a section of track that was originally constructed as the Canadian Northern Railway main line. The river passes the railway point of Dahlia, and leaves the park and Nipissing District to enter Renfrew County, at geographic Richards Township in the municipality of Killaloe, Hagarty and Richards. After only 1,100 metres (3,600 ft), it passes into geographic Fraser Township in the municipality of Laurentian Valley, then reaches the unincorporated place and railway point of Indian. It continues east, loops under Renfrew County Road 58, and reaches the community of Alice. It flows again under Renfrew County Road 58, then Renfrew County Road 26 at the community of Davis Mills, and under Ontario Highway 17, at this point part of the Trans-Canada Highway. The river enters the city of Pembroke, and reaches its mouth at the Muskrat River, just before that river reaches its own mouth at the Ottawa River.

== Tributaries ==
- O'Mearas Creek (left)
- Locksley Creek (right)
- Maves Creek (left)
- Crooked Lake Creek (right)
- Kelly Lake Creek (right)
- Gariepy Creek (right)
- Little Cranberry Creek (right)
- Turquoise Creek (left)
- Steer Creek (left)
- Walker Creek (left)

== See also ==
- List of rivers of Ontario

== Sources ==
- McMurtrie, Jeffrey (2008). "Algonquin Provincial Park and the Haliburton Highlands". Wikimedia Commons. Archived from the original on 2011-06-29.
- Map 9 (PDF) (Map). 1 : 700,000. Official road map of Ontario. Ministry of Transportation of Ontario. 2010-01-01.
- Restructured municipalities - Ontario map #5 (Map). Restructuring Maps of Ontario. Ontario Ministry of Municipal Affairs and Housing. 2006. Archived from the original on 2020-05-11.
