= Brent crater =

Crater in Nipissing District, Ontario, Canada

Brent Crater
- Location within Ontario
- Location: Papineau-Cameron and Unorganized South Nipissing District, Nipissing, Ontario, Canada; 46°04′22″N 78°28′38″W

Impact crater structure
- Diameter: 3.8 kilometres (2.4 mi)
- Age: 396 ± 20 million years (Middle Devonian)
- Exposed: No
- Drilled: Yes
- Bolide type: Chondrite
- Topo map: NTS 31L1 Brent
- Access: Brent Road

The Brent crater is an impact crater in both the geographic township of Deacon, Unorganized South Nipissing District and the municipal township of Papineau-Cameron in Nipissing District, northeastern Ontario, Canada, located north of Cedar Lake in northern Algonquin Provincial Park. It is 3.8 kilometres (2.4 mi) in diameter and the age is estimated to be ca. 453 million years (Ordovician). The crater can be reached using Brent Road, 32 kilometres (20 mi) south of Ontario Highway 17.

A sign, erected at the site by the Archeological and Historic Sites Board, Archives of Ontario, reads:

The Brent Crater: First recognized in 1951 from aerial photographs, the crater is a circular depression about two miles in diameter formed in Precambrian crystalline rocks. Geophysical and diamond drilling investigations show that the crater has a present depth of about 1,400 feet but is partly filled with sedimentary rocks with a thickness of 900 feet. The rocks beneath the crater floor are thoroughly fragmented over a depth of 2,000 feet. Like the similar New Quebec (Chubb) crater, the Brent crater is attributed to the high speed impact of a giant meteorite. It is calculated that the impact released energy equaling 250 megatons of TNT and occurred about 450 million years ago when this area was probably covered by a shallow sea.

There is an observation tower on the rim of the crater. The old wooden tower was demolished in July 2007, because it was not safe to use due to its age. A new tower has been built on a hill directly across the Brent Road from the demolished tower. The new tower on the hill offers a much better panorama of the entire crater. Parking will also be increased as part of the new tower improvements. There is a hiking trail leading to the crater floor. There are two small lakes, Gilmour and Tecumseh, located in the crater. Unlike most Algonquin Park lakes, which are usually acidic, the water in these lakes contains bicarbonate; this is thought to be a result of some sedimentary deposits of limestone escaping removal by glaciers in the lower parts of the crater.

The crater lies in the Ottawa-Bonnechere Graben, a 452 million year old rift valley.

The crater was named after the nearby village of Brent.

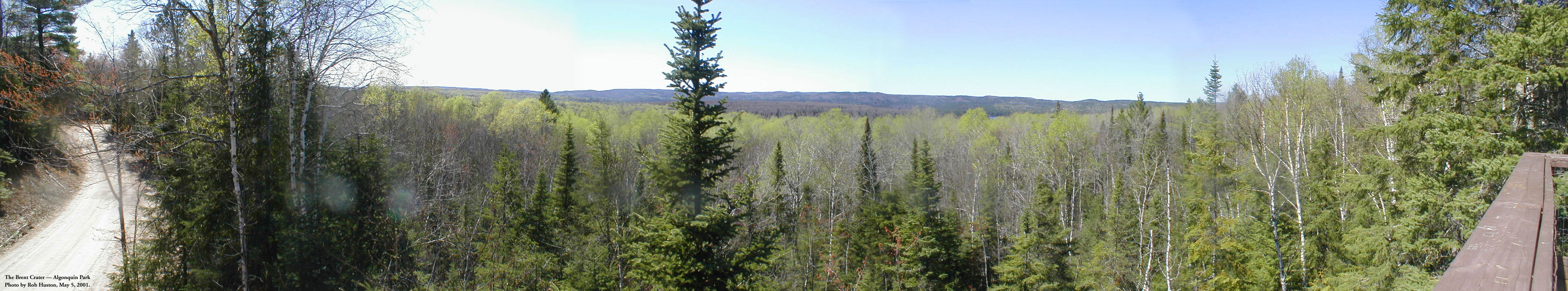
Brent Crater
