= Kilrush, Ontario =

Kilrush
- Etymology: Named for Kilrush, Ireland
- Location of Kilrush in Ontario
- Coordinates: 46°05′55″N 79°03′00″W
- Country: Canada
- Province: Ontario
- Region: Northeastern Ontario
- District: Nipissing
- Part: Nipissing, Unorganized South
- Elevation: 352 m (1,155 ft)
- Time zone: UTC-5 (Eastern Time Zone)
  - Summer (DST): UTC-4 (Eastern Time Zone)
- Postal code FSA: P0H
- Area codes: 705, 249

Kilrush is an unincorporated place and former railway point in geographic Boulter Township in the Unorganized South Part of Nipissing District in northeastern Ontario, Canada. Kilrush is located northwest of the northwest side of Algonquin Provincial Park on Kilrush Lake in the Amable du Fond River drainage basin.

It lies on the now-abandoned Canadian National Railway Alderdale Subdivision, a section of track that was originally constructed as the Canadian Northern Railway main line, between Fossmill to the west and Coristine to the east.
