= Barron River =

Barron River may refer to:

- Barron River (Queensland), Australia
  - Electoral district of Barron River, Queensland, Australia
- Barron River (Ontario), Canada
- Barron River, a river in Everglades City, Florida
