= Acanthus, Ontario =

Acanthus
- Location of Acanthus in Ontario
- Coordinates: 46°01′51″N 78°24′16″W
- Country: Canada
- Province: Ontario
- Region: Northeastern Ontario
- District: Nipissing
- Elevation: 319 m (1,047 ft)

Population (2016)
  - Total: 0
- Time zone: UTC-5 (Eastern Time Zone)
  - Summer (DST): UTC-4 (Eastern Time Zone)
- Postal code FSA: K0J
- Area codes: 705, 249

Acanthus is an unincorporated place and former railway point in geographic Deacon Township in the Unorganized South Part of Nipissing District in northeastern Ontario, Canada. Acanthus is located within Algonquin Provincial Park on Cedar Lake on the Petawawa River.

It lies on the now abandoned Canadian National Railway Beachburg Subdivision, a section of track that was originally constructed as the Canadian Northern Railway main line, between the divisional point Brent to the west and Odenback to the east; it had a passing track. The Beachburg Subdivision operated from 1915 until its closure in 1995, marking the end of rail service to the community.
