= Brawny, Ontario =

Brawny
- Location of Brawny in Ontario
- Coordinates: 45°54′17″N 77°57′04″W
- Country: Canada
- Province: Ontario
- Region: Northeastern Ontario
- District: Nipissing
- Part: Nipissing, Unorganized South
- Elevation: 239 m (784 ft)
- Time zone: UTC-5 (Eastern Time Zone)
  - Summer (DST): UTC-4 (Eastern Time Zone)
- Postal code FSA: K0J
- Area codes: 705, 249

Brawny is the name of an unincorporated place and former railway point in geographic Barron Township in the Unorganized South Part of Nipissing District in northeastern Ontario, Canada. Brawny is located within Algonquin Provincial Park.

The railway point lies on the now abandoned Canadian National Railway Beachburg Subdivision, a section of track that was originally constructed as the Canadian Northern Railway main line, between Stuart to the west and Hydro to the east.
