= Daventry (disambiguation) =

Daventry may refer to:

== Places ==
=== England ===
- The town of Daventry in Northamptonshire, England
  - Daventry District, a former local government district of Northamptonshire, covering the town and surrounding rural areas
  - Daventry (UK Parliament constituency), a Parliamentary constituency, covering much of western Northamptonshire

=== Canada ===
- Daventry, Ontario, an unincorporated place in Nipissing District, Ontario, Canada

=== United States ===
- Daventry (Community) a residential community in the West Springfield area of Fairfax County, Virginia, USA.

== Sport ==
- The Daventry Dolphins Swim Team competes in Division 11 of the Northern Virginia Swim League. They represent the Daventry residential community in the West Springfield area of Fairfax County, Virginia.
- Daventry Town F.C. football team based in Daventry, England.
- Daventry United F.C. former football team based in Daventry, England.

== Transport ==
- Daventry railway station former railway station serving Daventry, England.
- Daventry International Railfreight Terminal (DIRFT), a railfreight terminal on the West Coast Main Line north of Daventry town

== Fiction ==
- The Kingdom of Daventry is a mythical kingdom and the main setting of the graphic adventure series King's Quest

== Other uses ==
- Daventry Experiment an early experiment with radar in 1935.
- Viscount Daventry, peerage title named after the town in England
