= Coristine =

Coristine may refer to:

- Coristine, Ontario, unincorporated community
- Edward Coristine (born 2005), American software engineer
