= Dahlia, Ontario =

Dahlia
- Location of Dahlia in Ontario
- Coordinates: 45°47′00″N 77°33′07″W
- Country: Canada
- Province: Ontario
- Region: Northeastern Ontario
- District: Nipissing
- Part: Nipissing, Unorganized South
- Elevation: 226 m (741 ft)
- Time zone: UTC-5 (Eastern Time Zone)
  - Summer (DST): UTC-4 (Eastern Time Zone)
- Postal code FSA: K0J
- Area codes: 705, 249

Dahlia is an unincorporated place and former railway point in geographic Master Township in the Unorganized South Part of Nipissing District in northeastern Ontario, Canada. Dahlia is located within Algonquin Provincial Park on the Indian River.

The railway point lies on the now abandoned Canadian National Railway Beachburg Subdivision, a section of track that was originally constructed as the Canadian Northern Railway main line, between Kathmore to the west and Indian to the east.
