= Kiosk, Ontario =

Kiosk
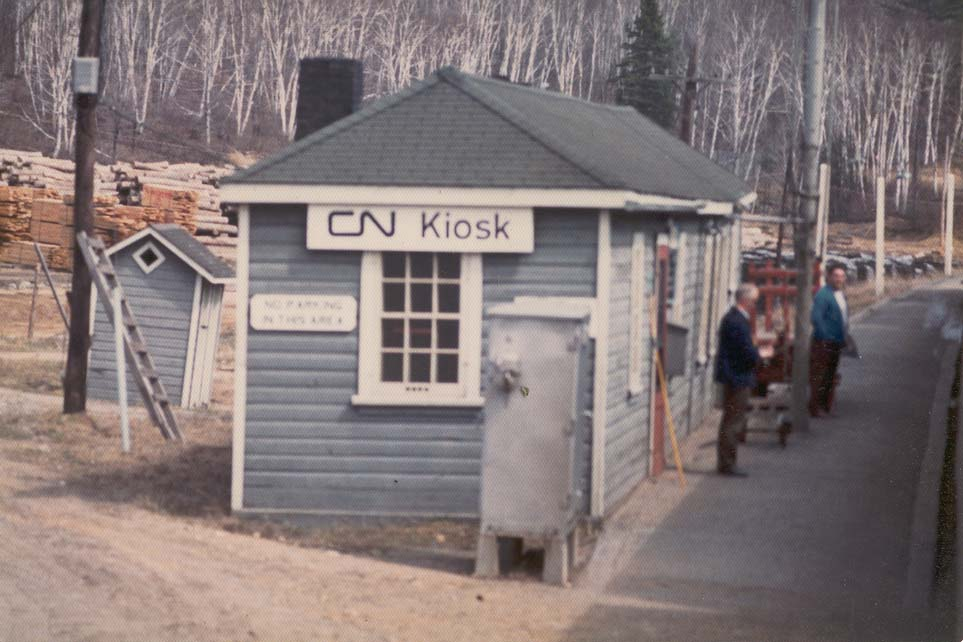
- Canadian National Railway station at Kiosk ca. 1970s
- Etymology: Abbreviation of Kioshkokwi Lake, which means "lake of many gulls"
- Location of Kiosk in Ontario
- Coordinates: 46°05′26″N 78°53′02″W
- Country: Canada
- Province: Ontario
- Region: Northeastern Ontario
- District: Nipissing
- Part: Nipissing, Unorganized South
- Elevation: 312 m (1,024 ft)
- Time zone: UTC-5 (Eastern Time Zone)
  - Summer (DST): UTC-4 (Eastern Time Zone)
- Postal code FSA: K0J
- Area codes: 705, 249

Kiosk is an unincorporated place and former railway point and community in geographic Pentland Township in the Unorganized South Part of Nipissing District in northeastern Ontario, Canada. Kiosk is surrounded by but not within Algonquin Provincial Park, for which it provides a road access point via Ontario Highway 630, and is located on Kioshkokwi Lake on the Amable du Fond River on the right bank of the outlet of that river from the lake and across the river from the unincorporated place of Coristine. The name "Kiosk" is an abbreviated form of the lake's name, which means "lake of many gulls".

It lies on the now abandoned Canadian National Railway Alderdale Subdivision, a section of track that was originally constructed as the Canadian Northern Railway main line, between Coristine to the west and Ascalon to the east.

Until a fire in July 1973, a lumber company operated; however, new regulations in the park area prohibited its rebuilding. The community was demolished in the 1980s and the railway was abandoned later, so that Kiosk today is a recreational area and automobile access point (#29) to the interior of Algonquin Provincial Park.

In 2015, it was used as the filming location for Robert Eggers' acclaimed horror feature The Witch.
