= Nipissing River =

- Location of the mouth of the Nipissing River in Ontario

Location
- Country: Canada
- Ontario: Ontario
- Region: Northeastern Ontario
- District: Nipissing
- Part: Nipissing, Unorganized South

Physical characteristics
- Source: Big Bob Lake
  - location: Paxton Township
  - coordinates: 45°46′34″N 79°03′36″W
  - elevation: 449 m (1,473 ft)
- Mouth: Cedar Lake on the Petawawa River
  - location: Lister Township
  - coordinates: 46°00′22″N 78°31′01″W
  - elevation: 308 m (1,010 ft)

Basin features
- River system: Saint Lawrence River drainage basin

The Nipissing River is a river in the Saint Lawrence River drainage basin in the Unorganized South Part of Nipissing District in northeastern Ontario, Canada. The river is entirely within Algonquin Provincial Park, and is a left tributary of the Petawawa River.

== Course ==
The river begins at Big Bob Lake in geographic Paxton Township and flows east, passes briefly through geographic Butt Township and geographic Devine Township, turns north into geographic Biggar Township, then back east, over Stewart's Dam and through the Allen Rapids, and into geographic Osler Township. It continues east over Graham's Dam, the High Falls and Gauthier's Dam, enters geographic Lister Township, flows over the Perley Dam and Rolling Dam, and empties into Cedar Lake on the Petawawa River, across the lake from the community of Brent. The Petawawa flows via the Ottawa River to the Saint Lawrence River.

== Tributaries ==
- Plumb Creek (right)
- Nadine Creek (left)
- Osler Creek (left)
- Coldspring Creek (right)
- Kelley Creek (left)
- Gibson Creek (left)
- Squawk Creek (right)
- Wolfland Creek (left)
- Beaverpaw Creek (right)
- Shag Creek (right)
- Loontail Creek (right)
- Chibiabos Creek (right)

== See also ==
- List of rivers of Ontario

== Sources ==
- McMurtrie, Jeffrey (2008). "Algonquin Provincial Park and the Haliburton Highlands". Wikimedia Commons. Archived from the original on 2011-06-29.
- Map 9 (PDF) (Map). 1 : 700,000. Official road map of Ontario. Ministry of Transportation of Ontario. 2010-01-01.
- Restructured municipalities - Ontario map #5 (Map). Restructuring Maps of Ontario. Ontario Ministry of Municipal Affairs and Housing. 2006. Archived from the original on 2020-05-11.
