= Government Park, Ontario =

Government Park
- Location of Government Park in Ontario
- Coordinates: 46°03′00″N 78°32′51″W
- Country: Canada
- Province: Ontario
- Region: Northeastern Ontario
- District: Nipissing
- Part: Nipissing, Unorganized South
- Elevation: 309 m (1,014 ft)
- Time zone: UTC-5 (Eastern Time Zone)
  - Summer (DST): UTC-4 (Eastern Time Zone)
- Postal code FSA: K0J
- Area codes: 705, 249

Government Park is an unincorporated place and former railway point in geographic Boyd Township in the Unorganized South Part of Nipissing District in northeastern Ontario, Canada. Government Park is located within Algonquin Provincial Park on Cedar Lake on the Petawawa River.

It lies on the now-abandoned Canadian National Railway Alderdale Subdivision, a section of track that was originally constructed as the Canadian Northern Railway main line, between Daventry to the west and the divisional point Brent to the east.
