= Coristine, Ontario =

Coristine
- Location of Coristine in Ontario
- Coordinates: 46°05′27″N 78°53′26″W
- Country: Canada
- Province: Ontario
- Region: Northeastern Ontario
- District: Nipissing
- Part: Nipissing, Unorganized South
- Elevation: 310 m (1,020 ft)
- Time zone: UTC-5 (Eastern Time Zone)
  - Summer (DST): UTC-4 (Eastern Time Zone)
- Postal code FSA: P0H
- Area codes: 705, 249

Coristine is an unincorporated place and former railway point in geographic Pentland Township in the Unorganized South Part of Nipissing District in northeastern Ontario, Canada. Coristine is located within Algonquin Provincial Park on Kioshkokwi Lake on the Amable du Fond River, on the right bank of the outlet of that river from the lake and opposite the settlement of Kiosk.

It lies on the now abandoned Canadian National Railway Alderdale Subdivision, a section of track that was originally constructed as the Canadian Northern Railway main line, between Kilrush to the west and Kiosk to the east.
