= Fairview, Ontario =

Fairview, Ontario can mean the following places:

- Fairview, Elgin County, Ontario
- Fairview, Stormont, Dundas and Glengarry United Counties, Ontario
- Fairview, Perth County, Ontario (on Oxford County line)
- Fairview, Renfrew County, Ontario
- Fairview, Peel Regional Municipality, Ontario
- Fairview, Brant County, Ontario
