= Kathmore, Ontario =

Kathmore
- Location of Kathmore in Ontario
- Coordinates: 45°49′12″N 77°38′12″W
- Country: Canada
- Province: Ontario
- Region: Northeastern Ontario
- District: Nipissing
- Part: Nipissing, Unorganized South
- Elevation: 233 m (764 ft)
- Time zone: UTC-5 (Eastern Time Zone)
  - Summer (DST): UTC-4 (Eastern Time Zone)
- Postal code FSA: K0J
- Area codes: 705, 249

Kathmore is an unincorporated place and former railway point in geographic Master Township in the Unorganized South Part of Nipissing District in Northeastern Ontario, Canada. Kathmore is located within Algonquin Provincial Park on Walker Creek, 500 metres (1,640 ft) upstream of that creek's mouth at the Indian River.

The railway point lies on the now abandoned Canadian National Railway Beachburg Subdivision, a section of track that was originally constructed as the Canadian Northern Railway main line, between Achray to the west and Dahlia to the east.
