= North Tea Lake =

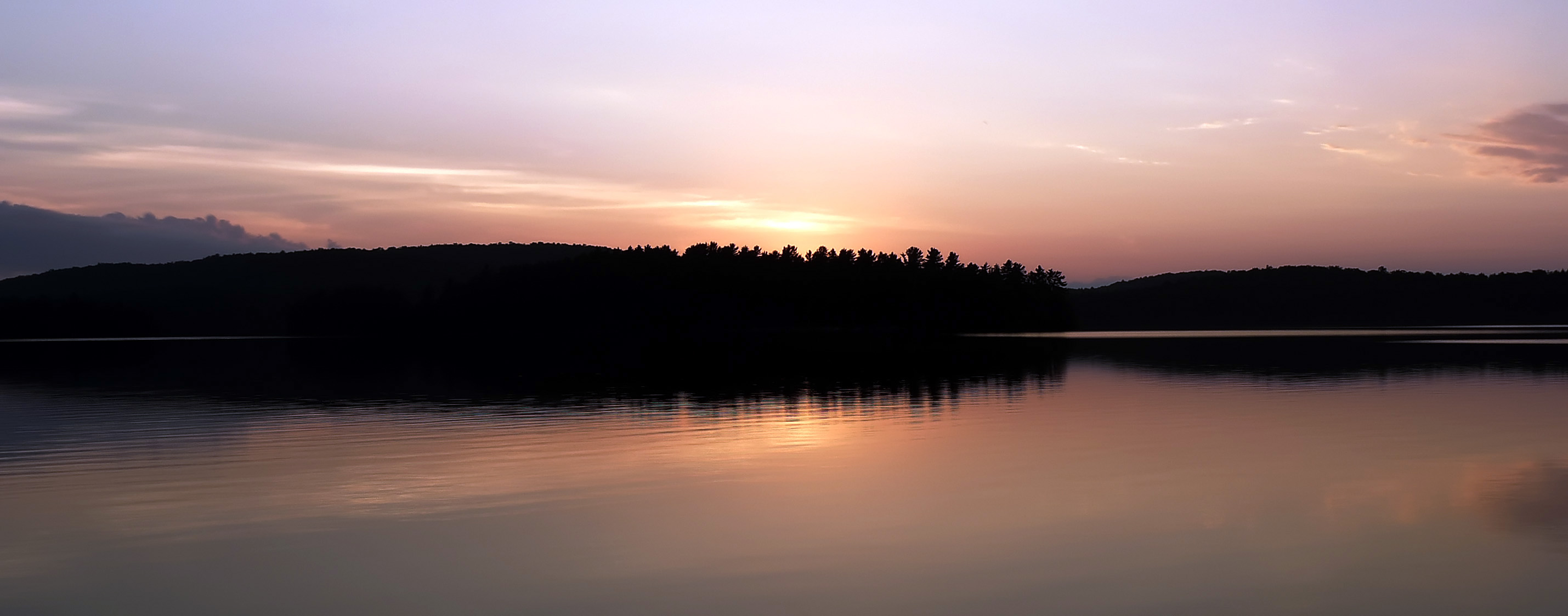
- Lake at sunset

- Location of North Tea Lake in Ontario.
- Location: Nipissing, Ontario, Canada
- Coordinates: 45°56′35″N 79°02′01″W
- Type: Lake
- Part of: Ottawa River drainage basin
- Primary inflows: Amable du Fond River
- Max. length: 10.5 km (6.5 mi)
- Max. width: 2 km (1.2 mi)
- Surface elevation: 360 m (1,180 ft)

North Tea Lake is a lake in the Ottawa River drainage basin in the geographic townships of Ballantyne and Wilkes in the Unorganized South Part of Nipissing District in Northeastern Ontario, Canada. It is on the Amable du Fond River and lies in the northwest of Algonquin Provincial Park. The lake is a popular destination for canoeists.

The primary inflow is the Amable du Fond River arriving from Kawawaymog Lake at the west. The primary outflow is the Amable du Fond River, at the northeast to Manitou Lake, which flows via the Mattawa River to the Ottawa River.

== Tributaries ==
"right" and "left" are with reference to the Amable du Fond River

- Lorne Creek (left)
- Cayuga Creek (right)
- Amable du Fond River

== See also ==
- List of lakes in Ontario
