= Nipissing =

Nipissing may refer to the following places in Ontario, Canada:

- Lake Nipissing
- The Nipissing First Nation
  - Nipissing 10, reserve of Nipissing First Nation
- Nipissing District, a census division
  - West Nipissing, an incorporated municipality in Nipissing District
- Nipissing River in Algonquin Provincial Park, a tributary of the Petawawa River
- Nipissing Township, in Parry Sound District
- Nipissing University in North Bay
- Electoral districts:
  - Nipissing (electoral district), a former federal electoral district
  - Nipissing (provincial electoral district), a current provincial electoral district
  - Nipissing—Timiskaming, a current federal electoral district

== Other ==
- Nipissing Great Lakes, a prehistoric lake
- SS Nipissing, an 1887 steamship, still in service as RMS Segwun
