= Indian, Ontario =

Indian
- Location of Indian in Ontario
- Coordinates: 45°45′21″N 77°27′08″W
- Country: Canada
- Province: Ontario
- Region: Eastern Ontario
- County: Renfrew
- Municipality: Laurentian Valley
- Elevation: 203 m (666 ft)
- Time zone: UTC-5 (Eastern Time Zone)
  - Summer (DST): UTC-4 (Eastern Time Zone)
- Postal code FSA: K0J
- Area codes: 613, 343

Indian is an unincorporated place and former railway point in the incorporated township of Laurentian Valley in Renfrew County, eastern Ontario, Canada. Indian is located on the Indian River just southeast of the southeast corner of Algonquin Provincial Park.

The railway point lies on the now abandoned Canadian National Railway Beachburg Subdivision, a section of track that was originally constructed as the Canadian Northern Railway main line, between Dahlia to the west and Alice to the east.
