= Achray, Ontario =

Achray
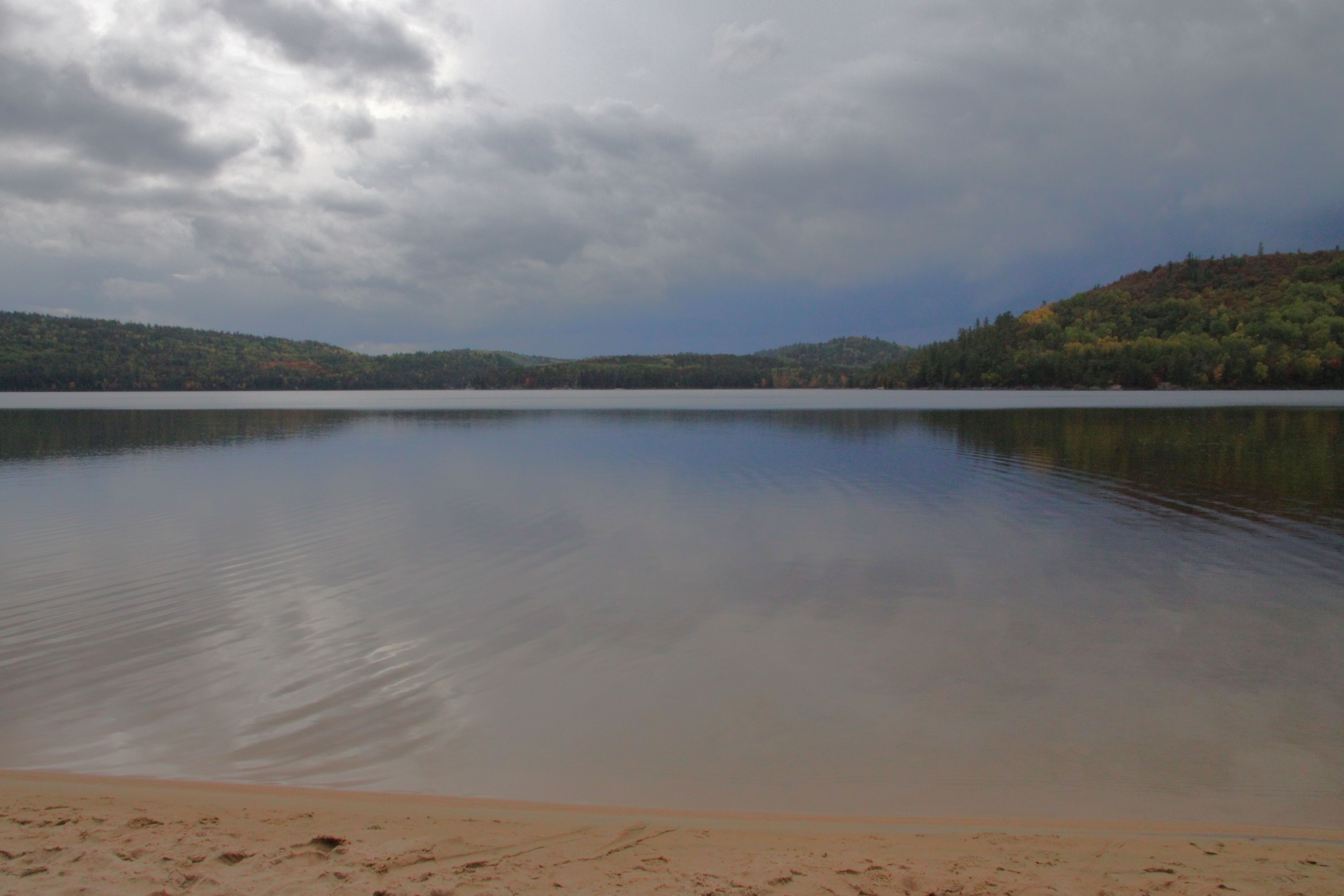
- Grand Lake at Achray

- Location of Achray in Ontario
- Coordinates: 45°52′04″N 77°45′25″W
- Country: Canada
- Province: Ontario
- District: Nipissing
- Census area: Unorg. South Nipissing
- Elevation: 228 m (748 ft)

Population (2016)
  - Total: 0
- Time zone: UTC-5 (Eastern Time Zone)
  - Summer (DST): UTC-4 (Eastern Time Zone)
- Postal Code FSA: K0J
- Area codes: 705, 249

Achray is an unincorporated place and former railway point in geographic Stratton Township in the Unorganized South Part of Nipissing District in northeastern Ontario, Canada It lies in northern Algonquin Provincial Park on the northern shore of Grand Lake, part of the Barron River system, and functions today as a campground site.

It was originally a station with a passing track on the main line of the Canadian Northern Railway, between Hydro to the west and Kathmore to the east, later taken over by Canadian National Railway as the CN Beachburg Subdivision and now abandoned in the park. Once a major centre for park administration, only a small complement of backcountry rangers still operates out of Achray. The old park operations centre is now a cinema/interpretive centre and the bunk house is now a tourist lodge at the canoe rental place on the Achray Road.

Tom Thomson's painting, The Jack Pine, was inspired by the scenery in this area. Thomson worked as a fire ranger at Achray in 1916. The cabin in which Thomson is reputed to have lived in now has some exhibits on the park history and Tom Thomson.

The campground has 45 campsites without electricity. Facilities are considered to be primitive compared to other campgrounds located in the park. The central park store is the former Deputy Chief Ranger Headquarters that was built in the 1930s by park rangers, Claude McFarland, an expert stonemason, and William Mooney, a skilled carpenter. It was built with stone quarried on the opposite shore of Grand Lake.

Achray has two hiking trails, including the small interpretive Berm Lake Trail, and the longer Eastern Pines Backpacking Trail that leads to a waterfall on the Barron River as it exits Stratton Lake.

The campground is a common starting point for multiday canoe trips on the Barren River to the Barron Canyon.

== See also ==
- List of unincorporated communities in Ontario
