= Cedar Lake (Nipissing District) =

Lake in Nipissing District, Ontario, Canada

- Location of Cedar Lake in Ontario
- Location: Algonquin Provincial Park, Nipissing District, Ontario
- Coordinates: 46°01′09″N 78°27′46″W
- Primary inflows: Nipissing River, Petawawa River
- Primary outflows: Petawawa River
- Basin countries: Canada
- Max. length: 12.6 kilometres (7.8 mi)
- Max. width: 5.8 kilometres (3.6 mi)
- Surface elevation: 308 metres (1,010 ft)
- Settlements: Acanthus, Brent, Government Park

Cedar Lake is a lake in the geographic townships of Boyd, Deacon and Lister in the Unorganized south part of Nipissing District in northeastern Ontario, Canada. The lake is in the Saint Lawrence River drainage basin and is entirely within Algonquin Provincial Park; it is a popular entry point for canoe trips into the interior of the park as the community of Brent, located on the lake, is connected by Brent Road to Ontario Highway 17. Other places on the lake are Acanthus and Government Park.

The primary inflows to Cedar Lake are the Nipissing River and Petawawa River, both arriving at the west, and the primary outflow is the Petawawa River at the east, controlled by a weir, which flows to the Ottawa River.

== See also ==
- List of lakes in Ontario
