= Daventry, Ontario =

Daventry
- Etymology: Named for Daventry, England
- Location of Daventry in Ontario
- Coordinates: 46°03′39″N 78°40′07″W
- Country: Canada
- Province: Ontario
- Region: Northeastern Ontario
- District: Nipissing
- Part: Nipissing, Unorganized South
- Elevation: 329 m (1,079 ft)
- Time zone: UTC-5 (Eastern Time Zone)
  - Summer (DST): UTC-4 (Eastern Time Zone)
- Postal code FSA: K0J
- Area codes: 705, 249

Daventry is an unincorporated place and former railway point in geographic Boyd Township in the Unorganized South Part of Nipissing District in northeastern Ontario, Canada. Daventry is located within Algonquin Provincial Park on Little Cauchon Lake.

It lies on the now abandoned Canadian National Railway Alderdale Subdivision, a section of track that was originally constructed as the Canadian Northern Railway main line, between Mink Lake to the west and Government Park to the east.
