= Odenback, Ontario =

Odenback
- Location of Odenback in Ontario
- Coordinates: 45°59′05″N 78°19′06″W
- Country: Canada
- Province: Ontario
- Region: Northeastern Ontario
- District: Nipissing
- Part: Nipissing, Unorganized South
- Elevation: 283 m (928 ft)
- Time zone: UTC-5 (Eastern Time Zone)
  - Summer (DST): UTC-4 (Eastern Time Zone)
- Postal code FSA: P0A
- Area codes: 705, 249

Odenback is an unincorporated place and former railway point in geographic Deacon Township in the Unorganized South Part of Nipissing District in northeastern Ontario, Canada. Odenback is located within Algonquin Provincial Park on Radiant Lake at the confluence of the tributary Little Madawaska River with the Petawawa River.

It lies on the now abandoned Canadian National Railway Beachburg Subdivision, a section of track that was originally constructed as the Canadian Northern Railway main line, between Ancanthus to the west and Radiant to the east; it had a rail siding.
