= Lake Traverse, Ontario =

Lake Traverse
- Location of Lake Traverse in Ontario
- Coordinates: 45°56′39″N 78°04′34″W
- Country: Canada
- Province: Ontario
- Region: Northeastern Ontario
- District: Nipissing
- Part: Nipissing, Unorganized South
- Elevation: 251 m (823 ft)
- Time zone: UTC-5 (Eastern Time Zone)
  - Summer (DST): UTC-4 (Eastern Time Zone)
- Postal code FSA: K0J
- Area codes: 705, 249

Lake Traverse is the name of two adjacent unincorporated places, one a former railway point and the other a compact rural community, in geographic White Township in the Unorganized South Part of Nipissing District in northeastern Ontario, Canada. They are both located within Algonquin Provincial Park, the compact rural community on Lake Travers (spelled without an "e" on the end) on the Petawawa River and the railway point slightly inland.

The railway point lies on the now abandoned Canadian National Railway Beachburg Subdivision, a section of track that was originally constructed as the Canadian Northern Railway main line, between Radiant to the west and Stuart to the east; it had a passing track.

Lake Traverse is the location for the Algonquin Radio Observatory.
