= Grand Lake (Nipissing District) =

Lake in the Ottawa River drainage basin

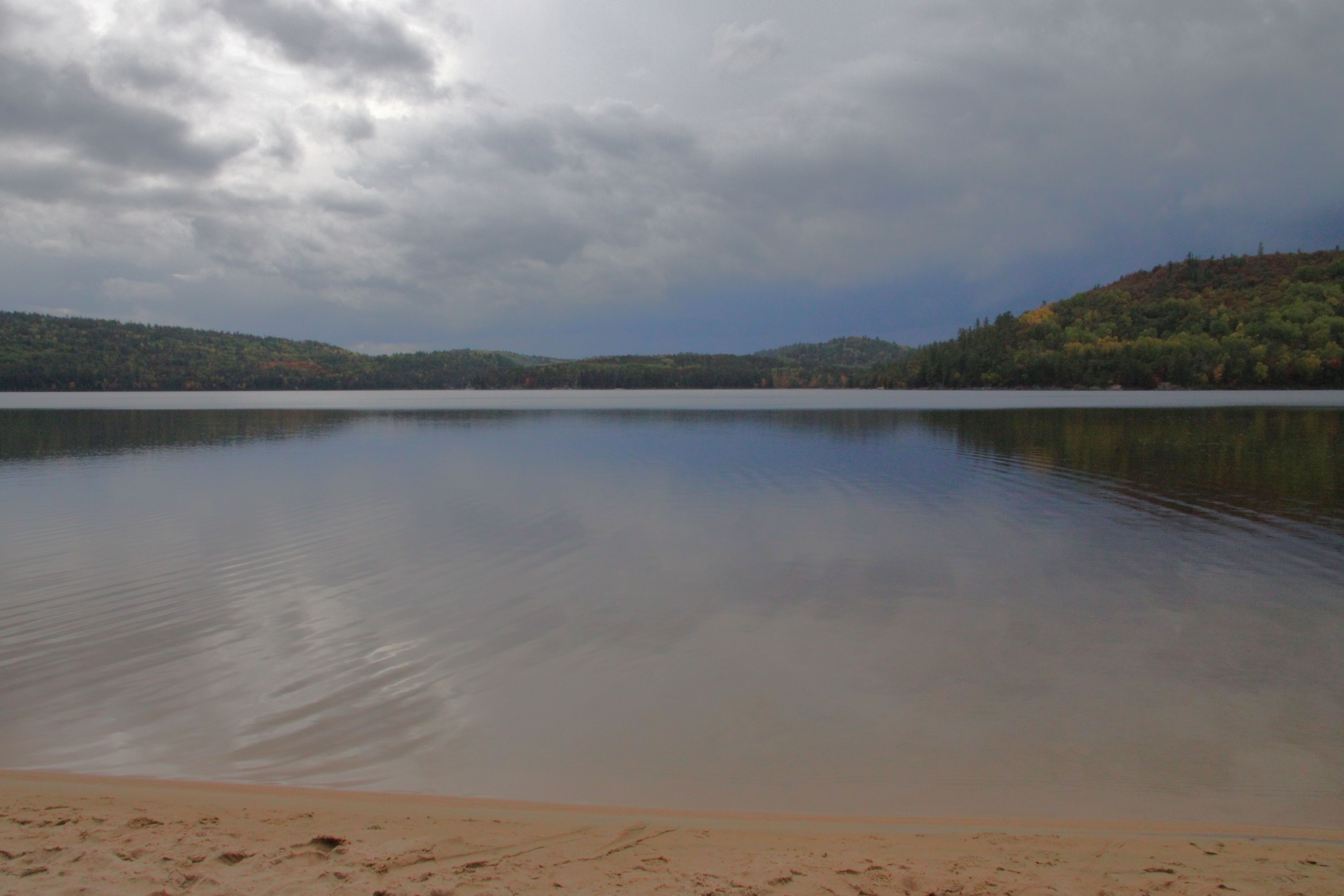
- Grand Lake from the Achray campground

- Location of Grand Lake in Ontario
- Location: Nipissing, Ontario, Canada
- Coordinates: 45°52′43″N 77°48′33″W
- Part of: Ottawa River drainage basin
- Primary inflows: Barron River, Carcajou Creek
- Primary outflows: Barron River
- Max. length: 11.9 km (7.4 mi)
- Max. width: 3.2 km (2.0 mi)
- Surface elevation: 222 m (728 ft)

Grand Lake is a lake in the Ottawa River drainage basin in the geographic townships of Barron and Stratton in the Unorganized South Part of Nipissing District in Northeastern Ontario, Canada.

The lake is long and narrow and lies in an east–west orientation, mostly in Barron Township except for the southeastern end which is in Stratton Township; it is entirely within Algonquin Provincial Park. The primary inflows are the Barron River from its source at Clemow Lake at the west and Carcajou Creek that enters the lake over the Carcajou Falls at the head of Carcajou Bay at the southeast. Primary outflow is the Barron River, controlled by the Grand Lake Dam, which flows at the east to Stratton Lake and further via the Petawawa River to the Ottawa River.

Grand Lake is crossed in the middle by the originally Canadian Northern Railway, later Canadian National Railway, main line, abandoned since 1994. The Achray park campground, formerly a station on the railway, is located on the north shore, and the unincorporated place of Hydro is on the former railway line at the western tip of the lake, near where a Hydro One hydroelectricity transmission line passes.

The lake is notable as the location where Tom Thomson painted The Jack Pine. There are also some petroglyphs on the granite cliffs on the north side of Carcajou Bay.

== Tributaries ==
"Right" and "left" are with reference to the Barron River.

- Barron River
- Carcajou Creek (right)
- Johnston Creek (left)
- Rowan Creek (left)
- Borutski Creek (left)
- Depot Creek (left)

== See also ==
- List of lakes in Ontario
