= Depot Creek (Barron River tributary) =

- Location of the mouth of Depot Creek in southern Ontario

Location
- Country: Canada
- Province: Ontario
- Region: Northeastern Ontario
- District: Nipissing

Physical characteristics
- Source: Unnamed lake
  - location: Edgar Township
  - coordinates: 45°57′56″N 77°55′53″W
  - elevation: 309 m (1,014 ft)
- Mouth: Grand Lake
  - location: Barron Township
  - coordinates: 45°54′18″N 77°52′03″W
  - elevation: 222 m (728 ft)

Depot Creek is a river in Nipissing District in Northeastern Ontario, Canada. It is in the Saint Lawrence River drainage basin, is a tributary of Grand Lake on the Barron River, and lies entirely within Algonquin Provincial Park.

The creek begins at an unnamed lake in geographic Edgar Township and flows north to Francis Lake, then turns east to Pretty Lake. It heads south, passes into geographic Barron Township, and reaches its mouth at Grand Lake. Grand Lake flows via the Barron River, the Petawawa River and the Ottawa River to the Saint Lawrence River.

== See also ==
- List of rivers of Ontario

== Sources ==
- Map 9 (PDF) (Map). 1 : 700,000. Official road map of Ontario. Ministry of Transportation of Ontario. 2014.
- Restructured municipalities - Ontario map #5 (Map). Restructuring Maps of Ontario. Ontario Ministry of Municipal Affairs and Housing. 2006. Archived from the original on 2020-05-11.
