= Canadian Northern Ontario Railway Federal Bridge =

Bridge in Ottawa, Ontario, Canada

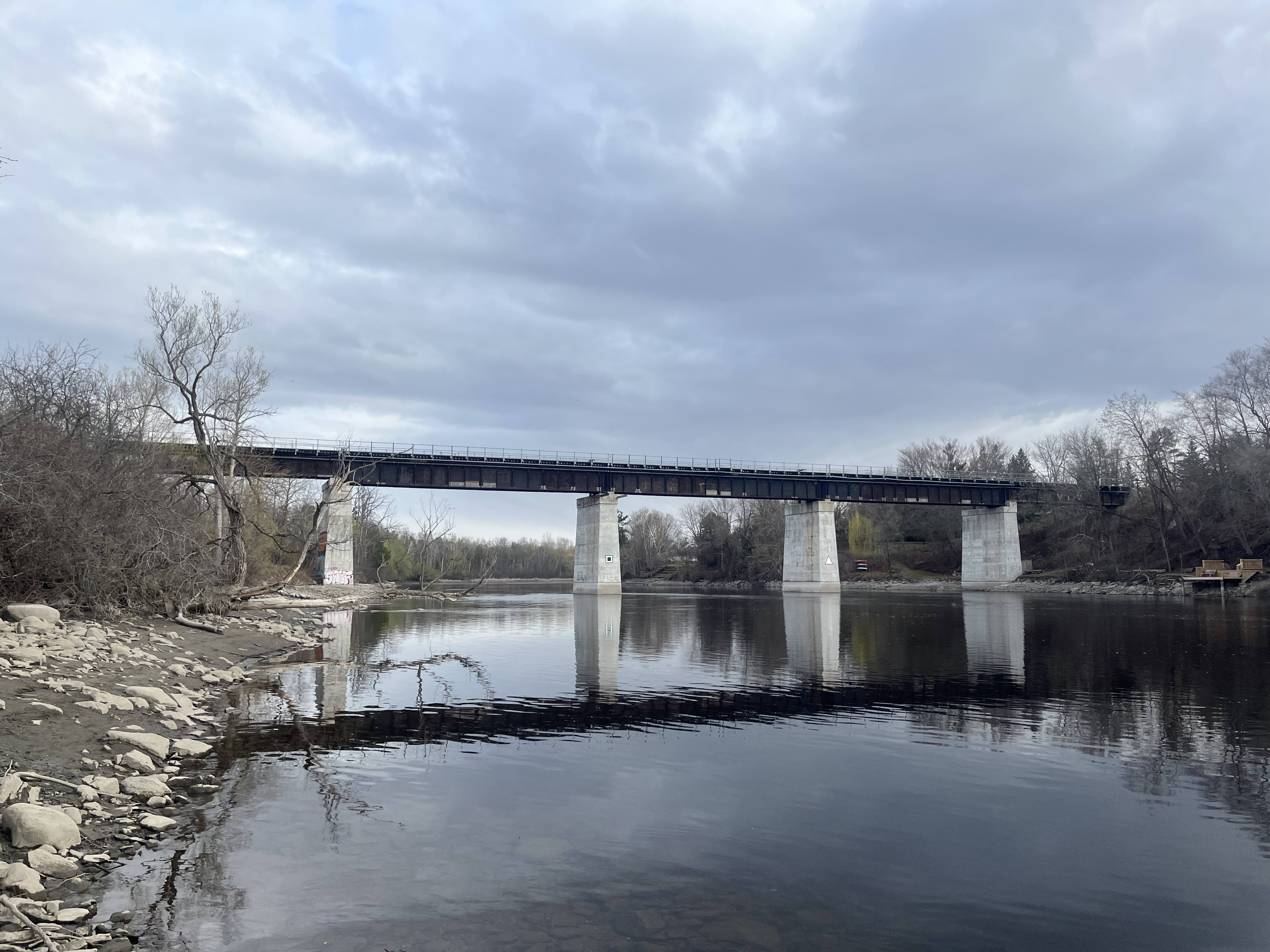
- Canadian Northern Ontario Railway Federal Bridge
- Coordinates: 45°20′44″N 75°41′52″W
- Crosses: Rideau River
- Owner: Canadian National Railway

Characteristics
- Material: Concrete, steel
- No. of spans: 5
- Piers in water: 4

History
- Opened: December 3, 1913

Location
- Interactive map of Canadian Northern Ontario Railway Federal Bridge

The Canadian Northern Ontario Railway Bridge is a railway plate girder bridge over the Rideau River from the Merivale area to the Mooney's Bay neighbourhood in Ottawa, Ontario, Canada. It is owned today by the CNOR's successor Canadian National Railway, and amongst other services carries the Via Rail Toronto – Ottawa Corridor passenger trains.

The official designation of the bridge is Mile 5.8, subdivision Beachburg.

== History ==
The bridge is on the CN Beachburg Subdivision, was authorized by BRC order 13668 on 18 May 1911, and the plans were approved by order 14828 on 20 September 1911. It was inaugurated with the opening of the line from Hurdman Junction (between today's Hurdman Station (OC Transpo) and Ottawa Train Station) to Smiths Falls on 3 December 1913.
