= Stuart, Ontario =

Stuart
- Location of Stuart in Ontario
- Coordinates: 45°55′52″N 78°00′54″W
- Country: Canada
- Province: Ontario
- Region: Northeastern Ontario
- District: Nipissing
- Part: Nipissing, Unorganized South
- Elevation: 236 m (774 ft)
- Time zone: UTC-5 (Eastern Time Zone)
  - Summer (DST): UTC-4 (Eastern Time Zone)
- Postal code FSA: K0J
- Area codes: 705, 249

Stuart is the name of an unincorporated place and former railway point in the geographic White Township in the Unorganized South Part of Nipissing District in northeastern Ontario, Canada. Stuart is located within Algonquin Provincial Park on Travers Creek.

The railway point lies on the now abandoned Canadian National Railway Beachburg Subdivision, a section of track that was originally constructed as the Canadian Northern Railway main line, between Lake Traverse to the west and Brawny to the east.
