= Radiant, Ontario =

Radiant
- Location of Radiant in Ontario
- Coordinates: 45°59′08″N 78°16′27″W
- Country: Canada
- Province: Ontario
- Region: Northeastern Ontario
- District: Nipissing
- Part: Nipissing, Unorganized South
- Elevation: 287 m (942 ft)
- Time zone: UTC-5 (Eastern Time Zone)
  - Summer (DST): UTC-4 (Eastern Time Zone)
- Postal code FSA: P0A
- Area codes: 705, 249

Radiant is an unincorporated place and former railway point in geographic Deacon Township in the Unorganized South Part of Nipissing District in northeastern Ontario, Canada. Radiant is located within Algonquin Provincial Park on Radiant Lake on the Petawawa River.

It lies on the now abandoned Canadian National Railway Beachburg Subdivision, a section of track that was originally constructed as the Canadian Northern Railway main line, between Odenback to the west and Lake Traverse to the east; it had a passing track.
