= Barron River (Ontario) =

Barron River French: Rivière Barron
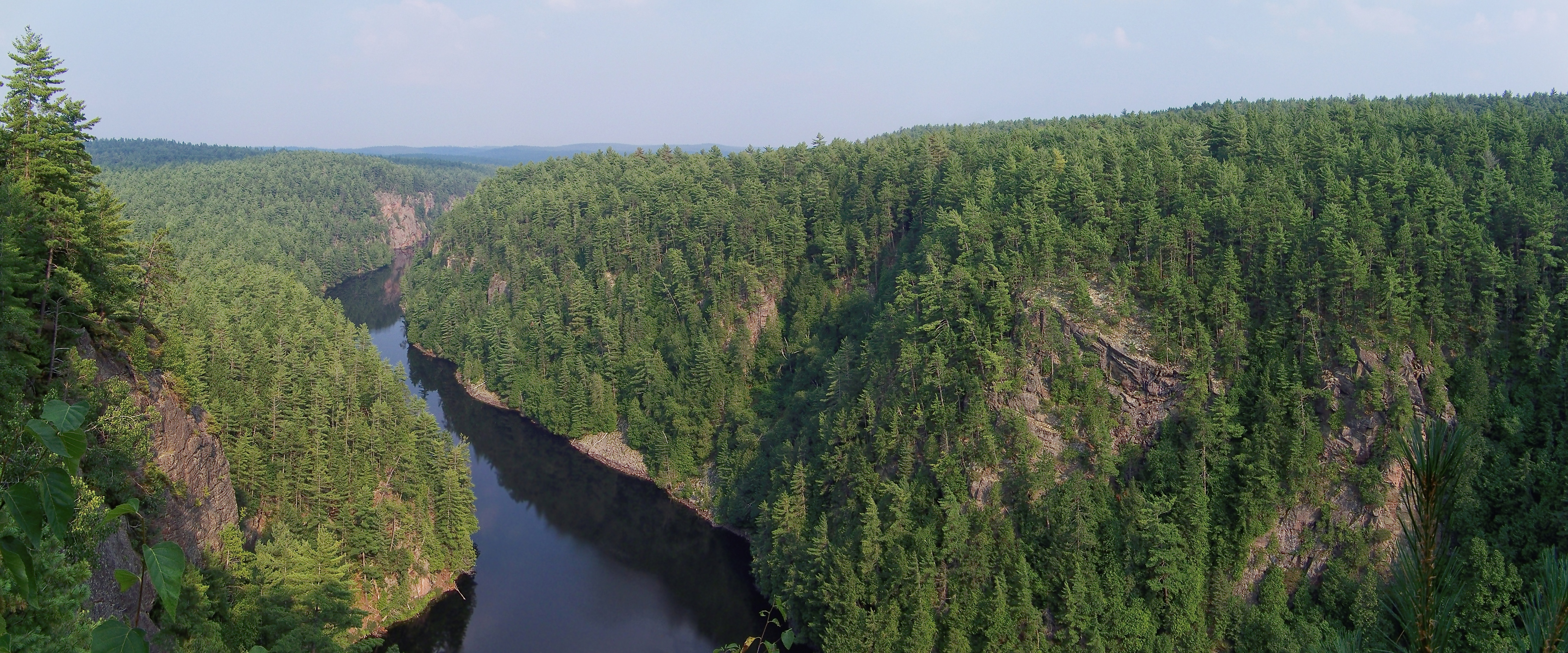
- View of the Barron River looking downstream from the top of the Barron Canyon

- Location of the mouth of the Barron River in southern Ontario

Location
- Country: Canada
- Province: Ontario
- District/County: Nipissing District; Renfrew County

Physical characteristics
- Source: Clemow Lake
  - location: Barron Township, Unorg. South Nipissing, Nipissing District, Northeastern Ontario
  - coordinates: 45°54′24″N 77°53′37″W
  - elevation: 225 m (738 ft)
- Mouth: Lac du Bois Dur, Petawawa River
  - location: Laurentian Hills, Renfrew County, Eastern Ontario
  - coordinates: 45°52′48″N 77°23′40″W
  - elevation: 139 m (456 ft)

Basin features
- River system: Saint Lawrence River drainage basin
- Tributaries
  - left: Mulock Creek, Carcajou Creek

The Barron River (French: rivière Barron) is a river in the Saint Lawrence River drainage basin in Nipissing District and Renfrew County, Ontario, Canada. It flows from Clemow Lake in northern Algonquin Provincial Park and joins the Petawawa River, whose southern branch it forms, in the municipality of Laurentian Hills, near the municipality of Petawawa.

The river is named after Barron Township through which it flows, which in turn was named in honour of John Augustus Barron.

A popular canoe route passes through and a hiking trail leads to the edge of the Barron Canyon.

== Geography ==
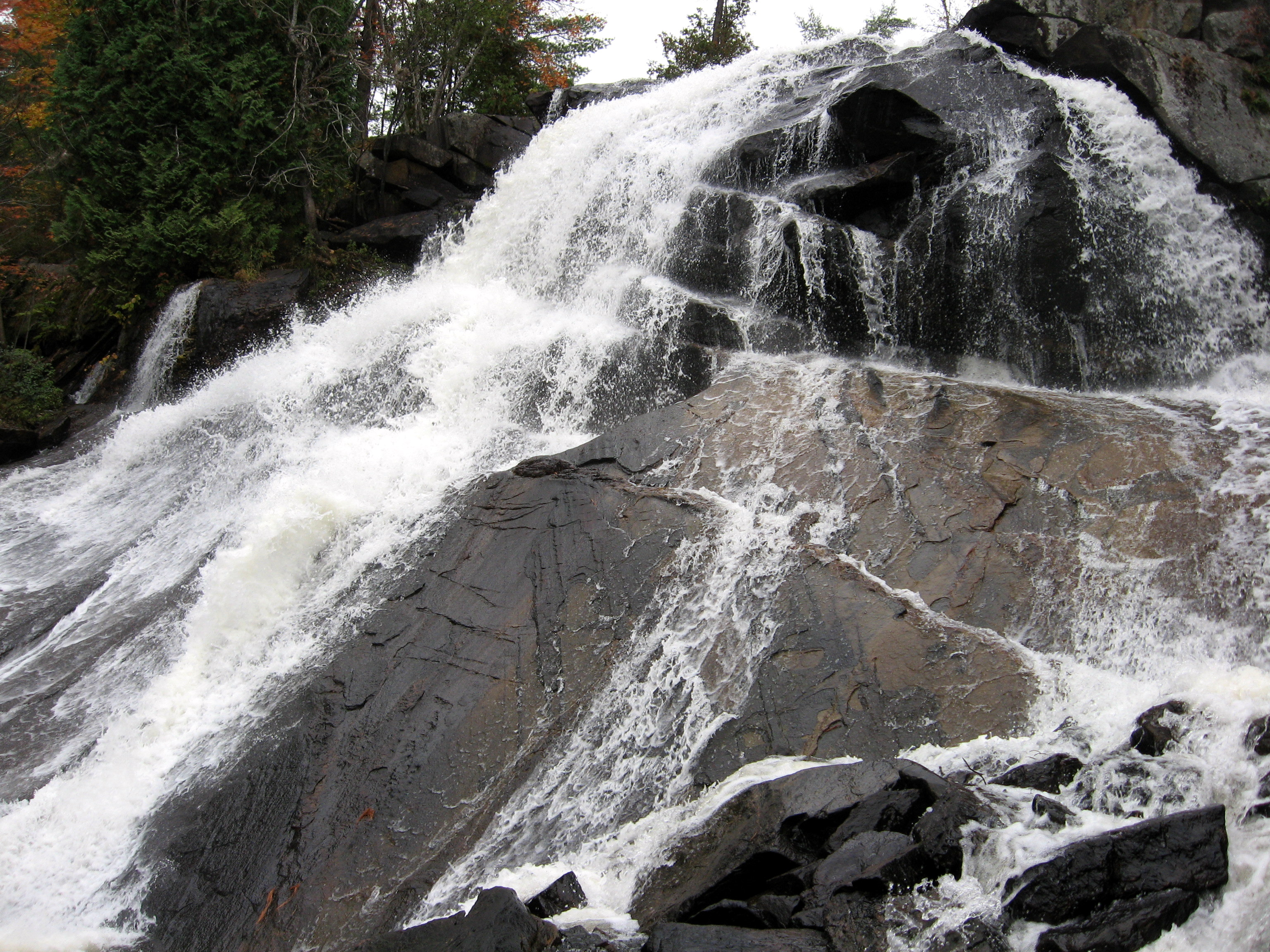
High Falls on the Barron River

The river begins at Clemow Lake in the geographic township of Barron in the Unorganized South Nipissing District of Nipissing District, Northeastern Ontario. It flows southeast through Grand Lake where it is crossed by the former Canadian Northern Railway later Canadian National Railway main line, now abandoned, and where the Achray campground, formerly a station on the railway, is located on the north shore.

It passes into Stratton Township, takes in the right tributary Carcajou Creek, then flows out over the Grand Lake Dam and again under the railway to enter Stratton Lake. The river turns northeast, passes over High Falls to High Falls Lake, then heads east over Brigham Chute. It takes in the right tributary Mulock Creek, enters Master Township, passes over the Cache Rapids, and reaches the Squirrel Depot picnic area and the Squirrel Rapids.

The river heads out of Algonquin Park and Nipissing District into McKay Township, part of the municipality of Laurentian Hills in Renfrew County, Eastern Ontario. At this point the river becomes part of Barron River Provincial Park on the south side while the north shore is part of CFB Petawawa. The river passes over First Chute and reaches its mouth at Lac du Bois Dur on the Petawawa River, which flows to the Ottawa River, about 2.5 kilometres (1.6 mi) west of the community of Black Bay and just before the border with the municipality of Petawawa. The Petawawa Rivers flows via the Ottawa River to the Saint Lawrence River.

=== Tributaries ===
in upstream order

- Spug Creek (left)
- Biggar Creek (left)
- Number One Creek (right)
- Ignace Creek (left)
- Mulock Creek (right)
- Hardwood Creek (left)
- Forbes Creek (left)
- Marie Creek (right)
- Grand Lake
  - Carcajou Creek (right)
  - Johnston Creek (left)
  - Rowan Creek (left)
  - Borutski Creek (left)
  - Depot Creek (left)

== Geology ==
Approximately 10,000 years ago, the river was a main outlet for glacial meltwater in this region. It is believed to have carried for a short time the outflow from the Lake Agassiz. The 100-metre (328 ft) deep Barron Canyon was formed during that time. The rocks exposed in the Canyon are part of the Canadian Shield. The canyon itself still shows activity in the form of rockfalls and landslides.

The Barron River lies inside a fault associated with the Ottawa-Bonnechere Graben.

== History ==
The river was an important highway during the last part of the 19th century and early 20th century when its water levels were carefully manipulated to facilitate the transport of timber to the Ottawa River and onwards. The Barron Canyon was the scene of noisy log drives every spring. The name the loggers used for the towering cliffs was the "Capes". Moving timber in this way was a dangerous task and evidence can be found by the graves still found on the edge of the Petawawa and Barron Rivers.

== Barron River Provincial Park ==
Barron River Provincial Park
- IUCN category II (national park)
- Interactive map of Barron River Provincial Park
- Nearest town: Petawawa
- Coordinates: 45°52′00″N 77°28′21″W
- Width: 200 m (660 ft)
- Area: 539 ha (1,330 acres)
- Designation: Waterway
- Established: 2006
- Governing body: Ontario Parks
- Website: www.ontarioparks.com/park/barronriver

The Barron River Provincial Park includes a 200 metres (660 ft) wide strip of land along the river's southern bank, from the eastern boundary of Algonquin Park to Black Bay in Petawawa Township. It was established in 2006 and protects an outstanding water route that provides recreational and educational opportunities.

A notable feature in the park is the eastern part of the Barron Canyon, that provide a microclimate in its cracks and crevices for plants that are more at home in the subarctic. On top of the cliffs are red and white pine forests.

It is a non-operating park without any facilities or services. Permitted activities include boating, canoeing, fishing, and hunting.

== See also ==
- Achray, Ontario
- Agawa Canyon
- Ouimet Canyon

== Sources ==
- McMurtrie, Jeffrey (2008). "Algonquin Provincial Park and the Haliburton Highlands". Wikimedia Commons. Archived from the original on June 29, 2011.
- Map 9 (PDF) (Map). 1 : 700,000. Official road map of Ontario. Ministry of Transportation of Ontario. January 1, 2010.
- Restructured municipalities - Ontario map #5 (Map). Restructuring Maps of Ontario. Ontario Ministry of Municipal Affairs and Housing. 2006. Archived from the original on July 6, 2011.
