= Brent, Ontario =

Brent
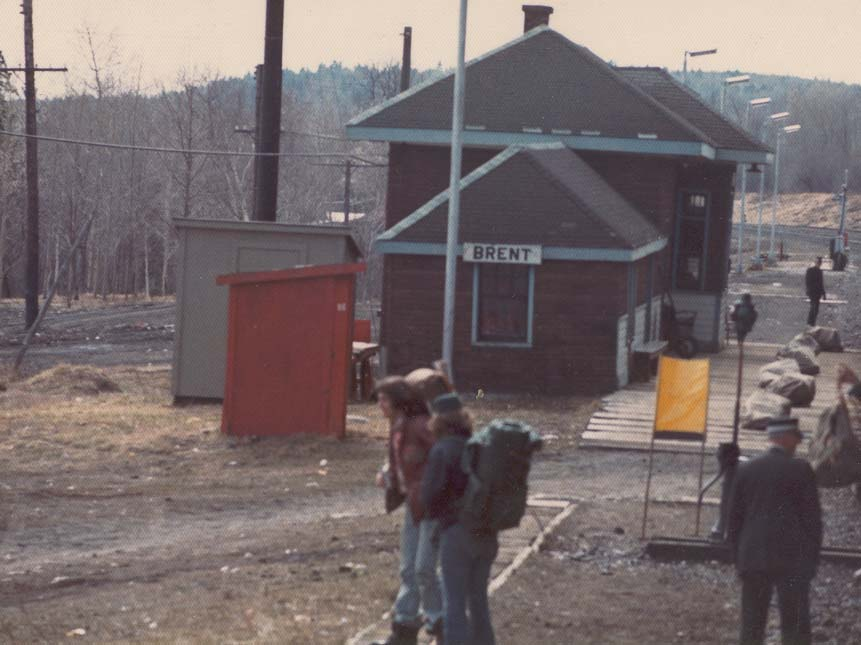
- Arriving by train CNR Brent, Ontario, in the 1970s
- Etymology: Named for Brentwood, England
- Location of Brent in Ontario
- Coordinates: 46°01′48″N 78°28′51″W
- Country: Canada
- Province: Ontario
- Region: Northeastern Ontario
- District: Nipissing
- Part: Nipissing, Unorganized South
- Elevation: 315 m (1,033 ft)

Population (2016)
  - Total: 0
- Time zone: UTC-5 (Eastern Time Zone)
  - Summer (DST): UTC-4 (Eastern Time Zone)
- Postal code FSA: K0J
- Area codes: 705, 249

Brent is a community on Cedar Lake on the Petawawa River in northern Algonquin Provincial Park and is located in geographic Deacon Township in the unorganized south part of Nipissing District in Northeastern Ontario, Canada.

It was originally a station and divisional point on the transcontinental main line of the Canadian Northern Railway, and was named for Brentwood, England, the home of Robert M. Horne-Payne, a director of the Canadian Northern. During the late 19th and early 20th century, a number of lumber companies operated at Brent. It later became a Canadian National Railway divisional point between the CN Alderdale Subdivision to the west and the CN Beachburg Subdivision to the east; the next railway points were Government Park to the west and Acanthus to the east. In 1995, Canadian National Railways decided to close the Northern Algonquin line to rail traffic, stating that operational costs were too high. As part of the closure the Brent rail yard was dismantled along with the yards' twin 125 KW generators that supplied power to Brent. Brent is too remote to be connected to the power grid so the remaining dwellings requiring power use either generator or solar or have no power at all.

The Brent village at its peak, c. 1930, had a schoolhouse, hotel, restaurant, post office, train station, round house, coal tower, water tower, sawmill, and houses to accommodate around 200 people both railway and sawmill employees.

Brent today is essentially a recreational camp site with some park services and is an access point to the interior of Algonquin Park. Brent operates seasonally with no permanent population. The village of Brent consists of 17 seasonal dwellings 14 of which are located in the east end (the rail yard) and the 3 in the west end (logging mill). Well-preserved ranger and deputy-ranger stations are located on the peninsula found at the easternmost edge of the village. There is also a graveyard located beside the present-day westernmost campsite number 2. There is no telephone or cellular phone access, as it is too far to connect to the telephone system and is out of range of any cellular network.

The Brent crater is located north of the village.

== Gallery ==
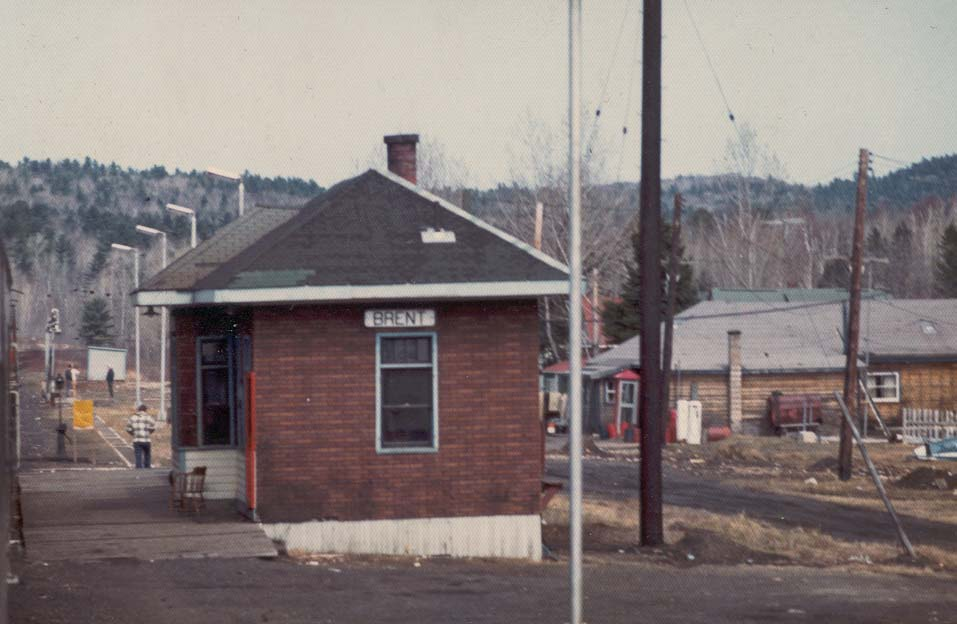
Brent station west side as seen from a train in the 1970s

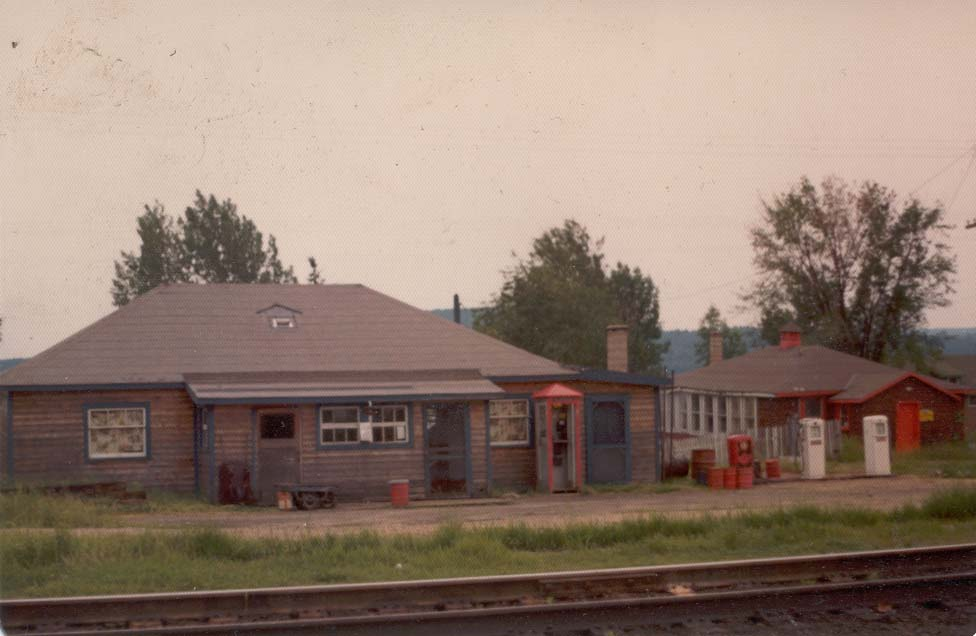
Brent Store in the 1970s. Note: Petrol pumps are no longer present.

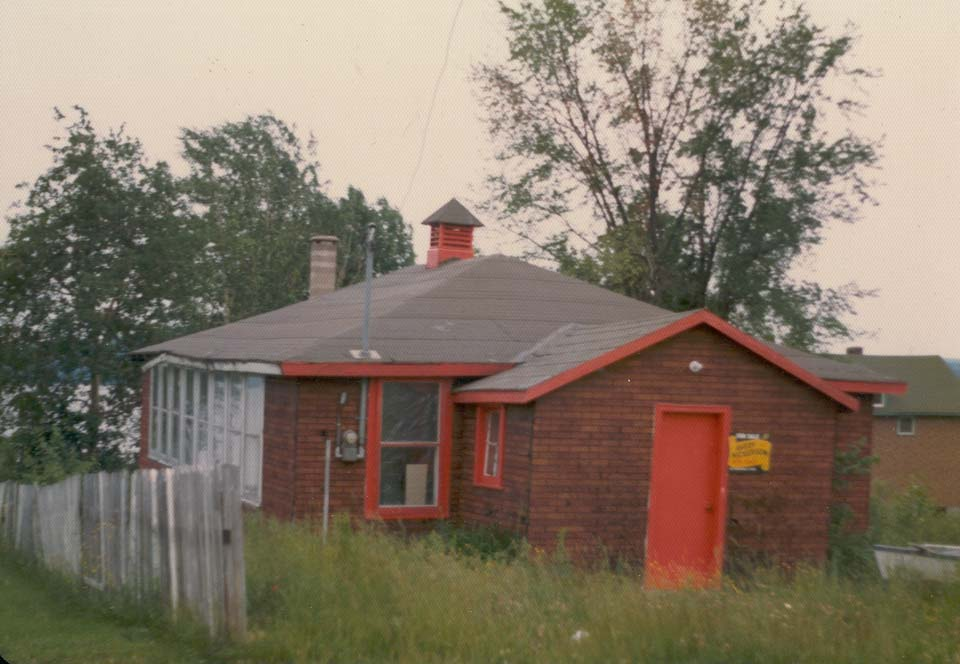
Brent One Room Schoolhouse, Brent, Ontario

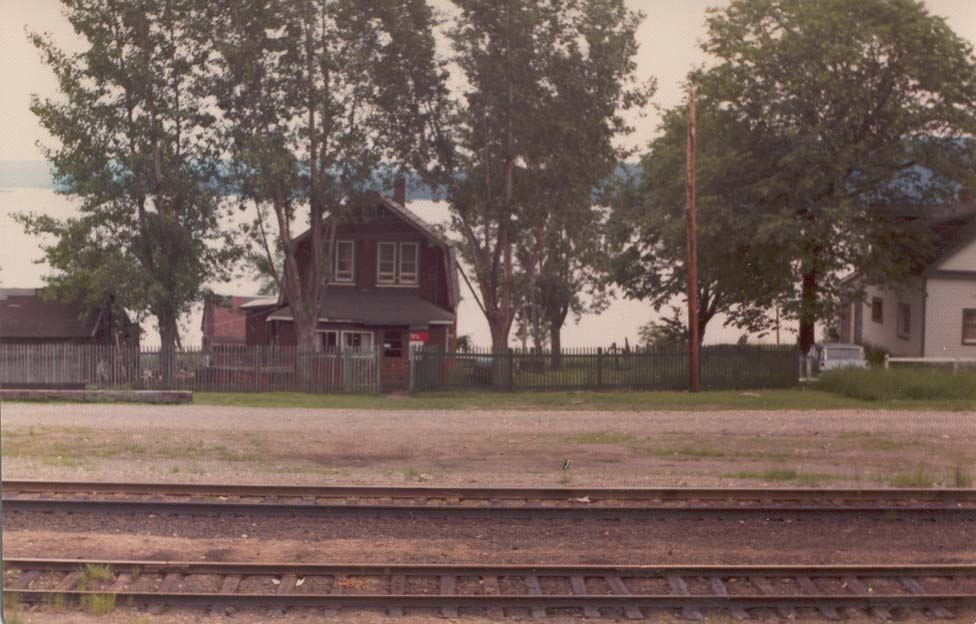
unidentified building, Brent, Ontario

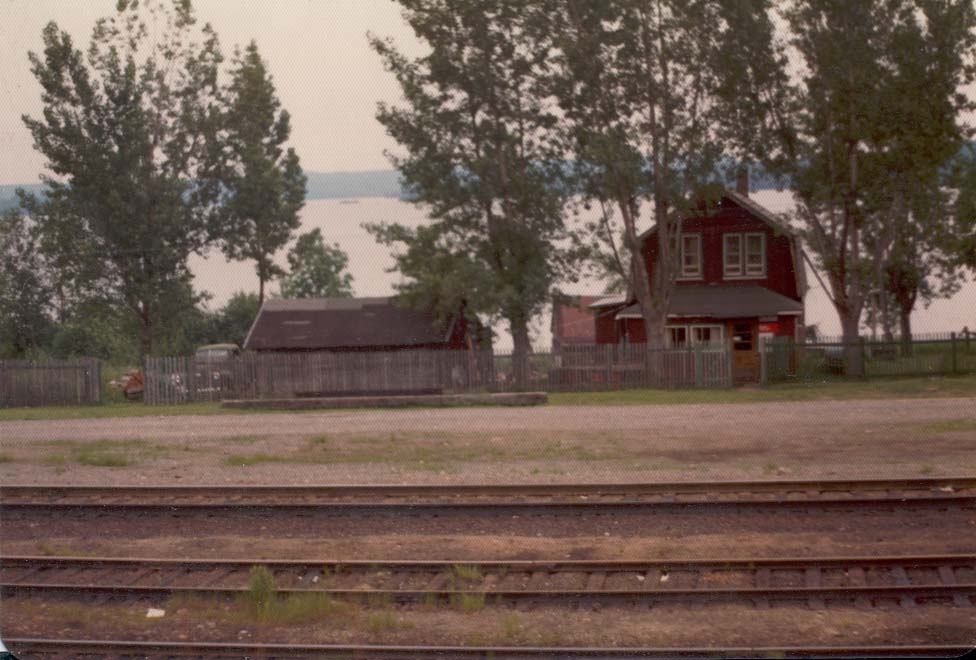
unidentified building, Brent, Ontario

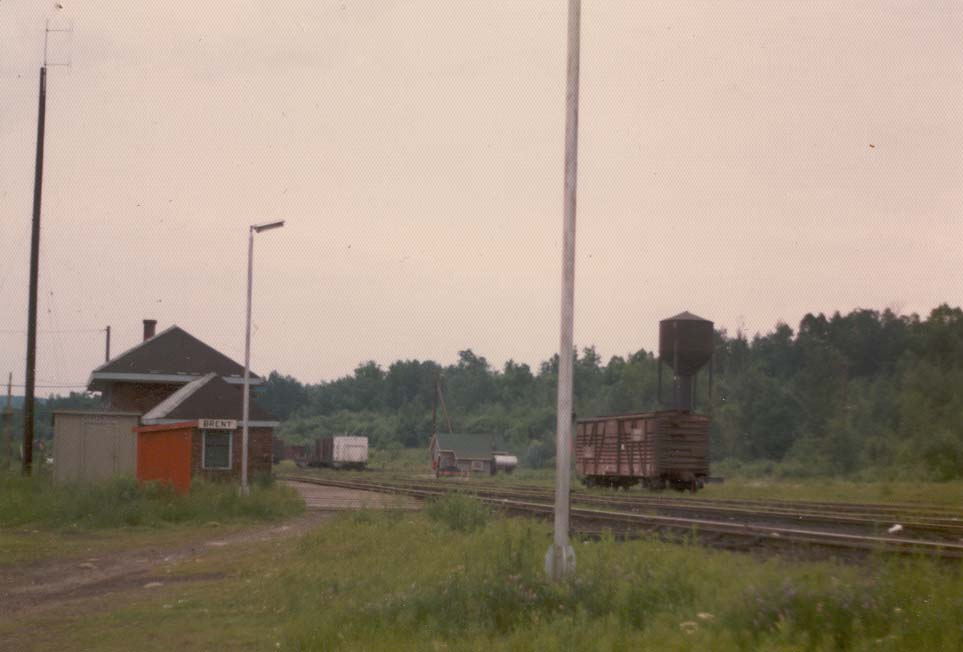
Railway yard and Brent Station, looking west in the 1970s

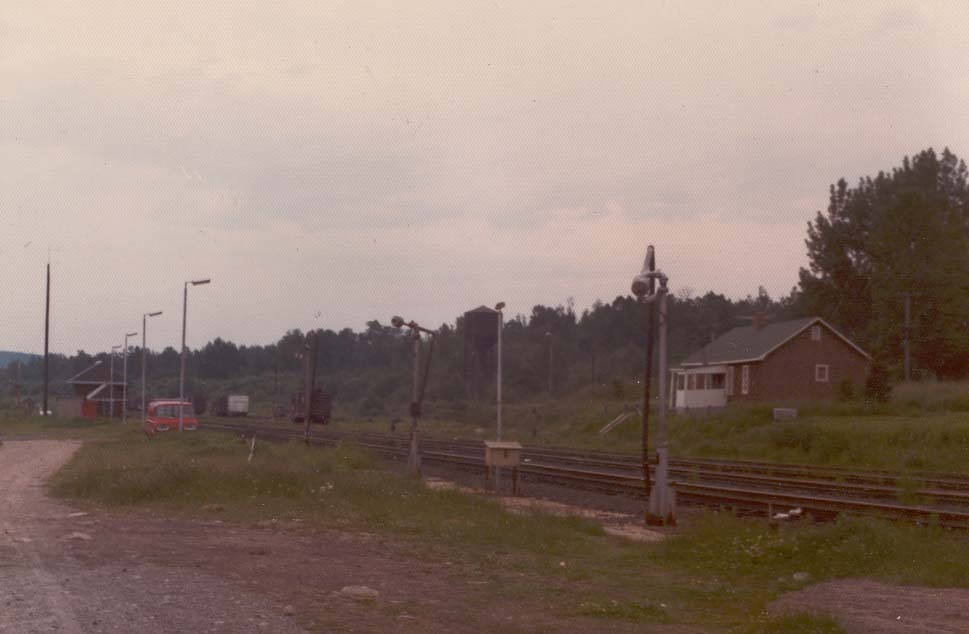
Railway yard and Brent Station, looking west in the 1970s

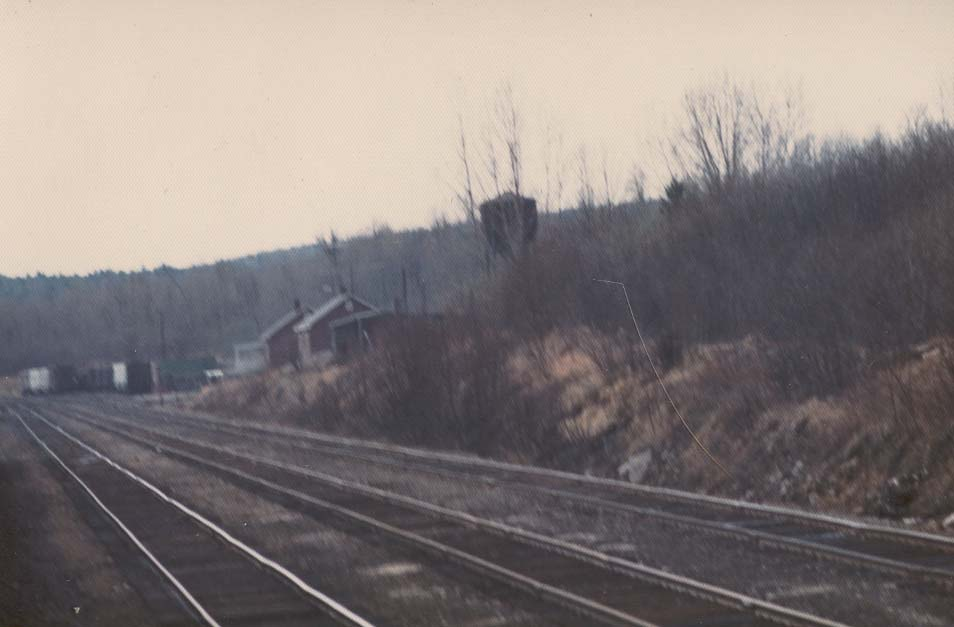
Brent railway yard as seen from a passing train in springtime early 1970s
