= Laurentian Valley =

Township in Ontario, Canada

- Township (lower-tier)
- Township of Laurentian Valley
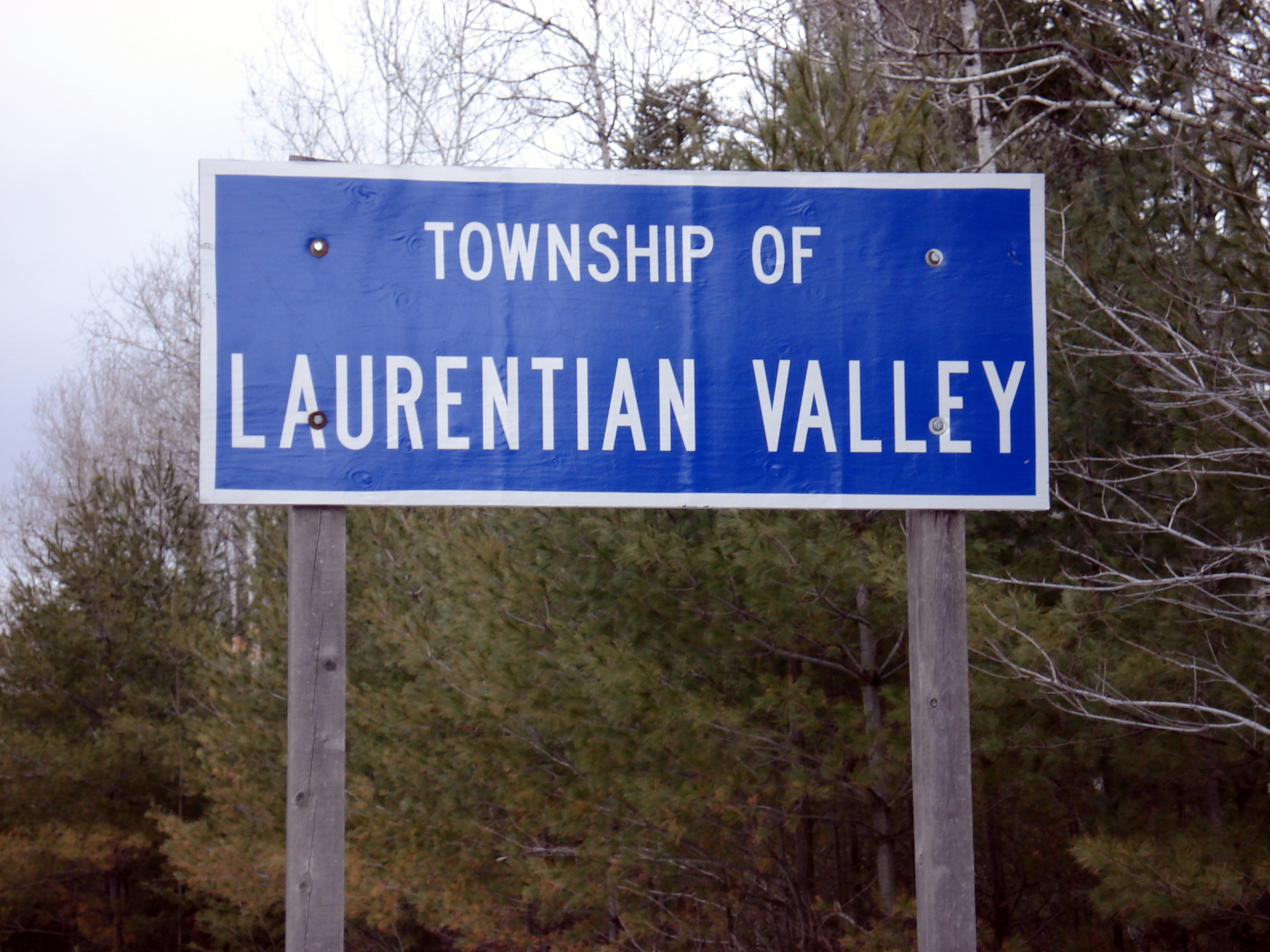
- Sign on Round Lake Road

- Location within Renfrew County Location within Southern Ontario
- Coordinates: 45°46′05″N 77°13′26″W
- Country: Canada
- Province: Ontario
- County: Renfrew
- Established: January 1, 2000

Government
  - Mayor: Steve Bennett

Area
  - Land: 539.08 km^{2} (208.14 sq mi)

Population (2021)
  - Total: 9,450
  - Density: 17.5/km^{2} (45/sq mi)
- Time zone: UTC-5 (Eastern Time Zone)
  - Summer (DST): UTC-4 (Eastern Time Zone)
- Area codes: 613, 343
- Website: www.lvtownship.ca

Laurentian Valley is a township in Renfrew County in Eastern Ontario, Canada. It borders on the Ottawa River, the city of Pembroke and the town of Petawawa.

This township was created on January 1, 2000, from the former townships of Stafford-Pembroke and Alice and Fraser.

== Communities ==
The township comprises the communities of Alice, Cotnam Island, Davis Mills, Fairview, Forest Lea, French Settlement, Gorr Subdivision, Government Road, Greenwood, Hiam, Huckabones Corners, Indian, Kathmae Siding, Locksley, Lower Stafford, Micksburg, Pleasant View, Shady Nook, Stonebrook and Trautrim Subdivision.

== History ==
In 1997, the Township of Stafford and the Township of Pembroke merged to form the Township Municipality of Stafford-Pembroke. On January 1, 2000, this township merged with the Township of Alice & Fraser to form the Township Municipality of Laurentian Valley. Jack Wilson was its first mayor.

== Demographics ==
In the 2021 Census of Population conducted by Statistics Canada, Laurentian Valley had a population of 9,450 living in 3,715 of its 3,877 total private dwellings, a change of 0.7% from its 2016 population of 9,387. With a land area of 539.08 km^{2} (208.14 sq mi), it had a population density of 17.5/km^{2} (45.4/sq mi) in 2021.

Historical census populations – Laurentian Valley
Year	Pop.	±%
1996	8,978	—
2001	8,733	−2.7%
2006	9,265	+6.1%
2011	9,657	+4.2%
2016	9,387	−2.8%
2021	9,450	+0.7%
1996 total is the combined figure for former townships. Source: Statistics Canada

== Local government ==
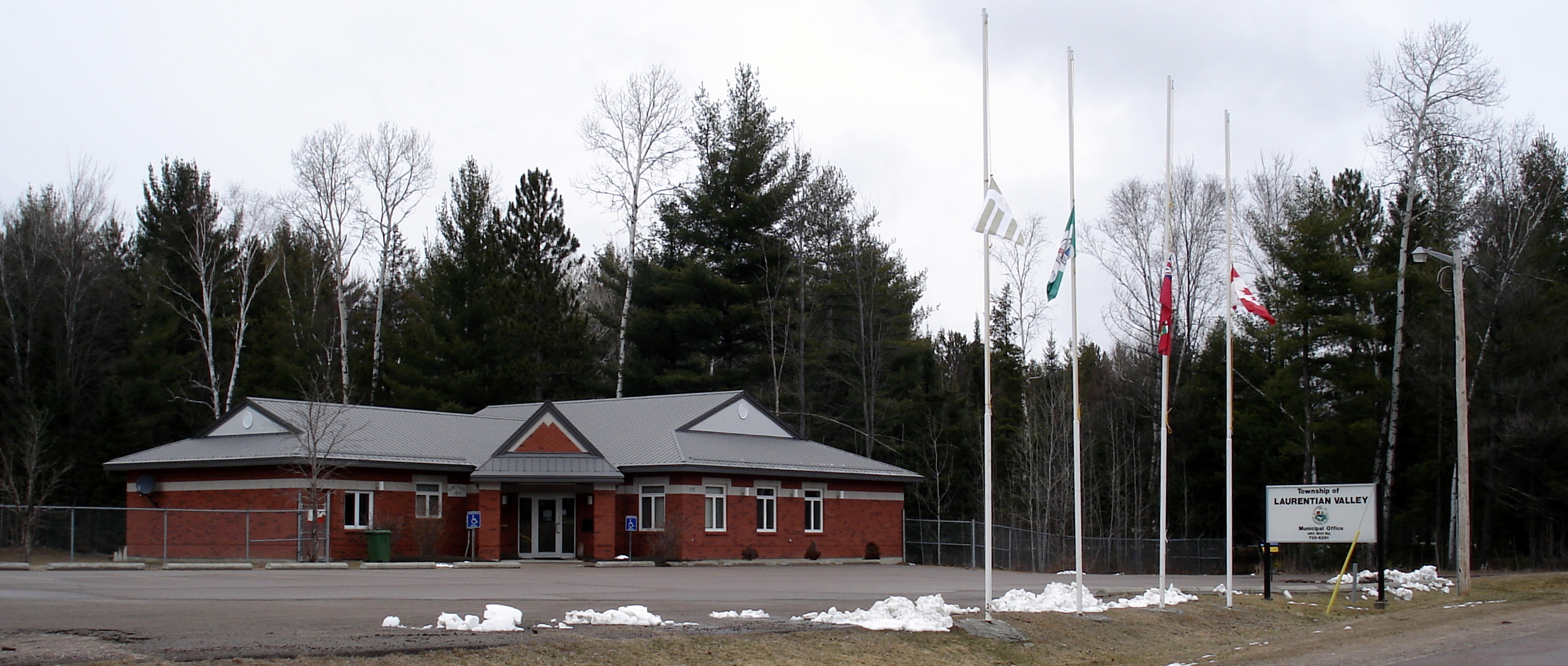
The township office on Witt Road.

List of former mayors:

- Jack Wilson (2000–2014)
- Steve Bennett (2014–present)

For the 2010–2011 fiscal year, the township spent CA$2,700,000.

== See also ==
- List of francophone communities in Ontario
- List of townships in Ontario
