= CN Beachburg Subdivision =

Beachburg Subdivision

Overview
- Status: Partially Ceased operation
- Owner: Canadian Northern Railway (1915–23); Canadian National Railway (1923–96); Ottawa Central Railway (1998–2008); Canadian National Railway (2008–present)
- Termini: Ottawa station; Brent

Service
- Type: Heavy rail
- System: Canadian Northern Railway (1915–1923); Canadian National Railway (1923–1996)
- Services: Super Continental; Northlander

History
- Opened: 1915
- Closed: April 2013

Technical
- Line length: 163.9 mi (263.8 km)
- Track gauge: 1,435 mm (4 ft 8 1/2 in) standard gauge

The Canadian National Railway's Beachburg Subdivision, or "Beachburg Sub" for short, was part of the former Transcontinental Mainline. The Beachburg Sub connected Ottawa to Brent, Ontario.

The line began operating in 1915 as part of Canadian Northern Railway, and in 1923 it became part of the Canadian National Railway. The route passed through a portion of Algonquin Provincial Park in Ontario, where Achray was a station in the park with a passing track on the mainline. The final train through the park was an eastbound freight on November 24, 1995. Abandonment from Pembroke, west to Brent, went through, and the rail was lifted at Pembroke west through the park and was completed by September 1997. The remaining line went from Ottawa MP 0.0 to Pembroke MP 88.7.

Ottawa Central Railway began operating in 1998 to 2008 as a short-line maintaining local traffic to industries along remaining line out of Walkley Yard in Ottawa. On November 3, 2008, CN bought the short line and began running the local traffic, with the intention of discontinuing the line from Nepean Junction to Pembroke. Traffic slowed as industry along the line closed or ramped down production. A group called Transport Pontiac-Renfrew (TPR) was working towards a deal to acquire the Beachburg sub for future passenger service to Ottawa and Pembroke and freight service. Without a deal made, in April 2013 CN began removing rail in Pembroke and working east.

A short section of the line between the Ottawa Railway Station and the junction with the Smith Falls Subdivision (after crossing the Canadian Northern Ontario Railway Federal Bridge) is currently owned and operated by VIA Rail, which operates its Corridor service between Ottawa and Toronto.

In 2019, the City of Ottawa announced its intention to acquire a portion of the Beachburg Subdivision right of way for possible eventual use as a belt line in the city's growing O-Train light rail transit system. In 2021, Ottawa City Council approved the purchase of the abandoned section of the Beachburg Subdivision between Nepean Junction and the Ottawa River.
