= CN Alderdale Subdivision =

Alderdale Subdivision

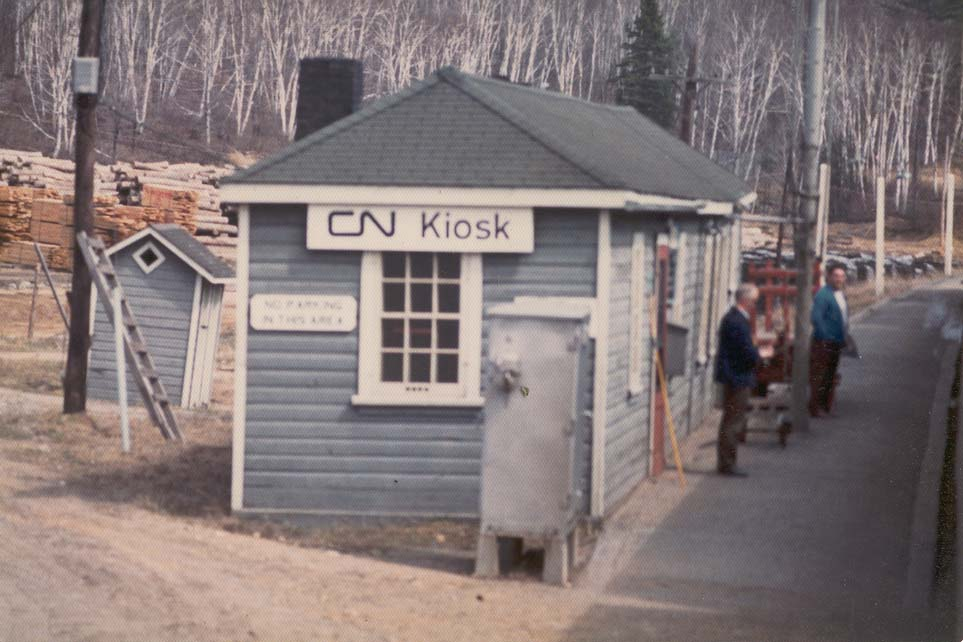
- Canadian National Railway station at Kiosk, c. 1970s

Overview
- Status: Ceased operation; tracks lifted
- Owner: Canadian Northern Railway (1915–23); Canadian National Railway (1923–96)
- Locale: Northeastern Ontario, Canada
- Termini: Brent; Capreol

Service
- Type: Heavy rail
- System: Canadian Northern Railway (1915–1923); Canadian National Railway (1923–1996)
- Services: Super Continental; Northlander

History
- Opened: 1915
- Reorganization: 1987–88 (into CN Beachburg and CN Newmarket Subdivisions)
- Closed: 1996

Technical
- Line length: 144.76 mi (232.97 km)
- Track gauge: 1,435 mm (4 ft 8 1/2 in) standard gauge
- Operating speed: 60 mph (97 km/h)

The Canadian National Railway Alderdale Subdivision was a railway line in Northeastern Ontario, Canada. It originally opened in 1915 as a part of the Canadian Northern Railway's transcontinental mainline. It connected Brent in the east with Capreol in the west. At Capreol it formed the eastern component of an east–west-south wye junction. The line's divisional point was at Alderdale.

== History ==
=== Origin ===
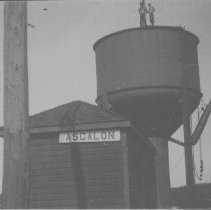
Ascalon at Mink Lake, as seen in 1932.

The line originated as a part of the Canadian Northern Railway (CNoR) mainline, which was pushing eastward from the Prairies in an effort to connect its network to Montréal. The segment from Capreol to North Bay opened to passenger traffic in 1915. After the Canadian Northern's amalgamation with other railways, resulting in the Canadian National Railway (CN), the line was used as CN's most direct route between Québec and the Prairies, paralleling the competing CP North Bay Subdivision to the north along its eastern stretch and the CP Cartier Subdivision to the south along its western. As part of CN's reorganization of the Canadian Northern lines, the stretch from Brent to Capreol became known as the Alderdale Subdivision and was part of the Capreol Division, Northern Ontario District.

=== Flagship route ===
Throughout the mid-20th century, the subdivision formed part of the route for CN's flagship transcontinental passenger trains, such as the Continental and Super Continental. Its main use, however, was as a freight railway, with large amounts of timber from the mills at Kiosk, Fossmill, and Skead, as well as ore from Crerar, being transported along the line. Local passenger services declined and were discontinued by CN in the 1960s, but the Super Continental continued despite repeated applications by CN to the Canadian Transport Commission to end it. In 1977, Via Rail was formed as a Crown corporation under the Canadian federal government and immediately assumed control of CP's passenger service, while also slowly integrating CN services. This resulted in the ex-CP Canadian from Toronto to Vancouver as the primary transcontinental passenger service and CN's Super Continental as the secondary one. By 1979, services had been reorganized such that the Canadian was routed along the CP North Bay Subdivision between Sudbury and North Bay, and the Super Continental routed along the modern-day route of the Canadian south to Toronto from Sudbury along CN tracks, with the Alderdale Subdivision seeing no passenger service along most of its length. However, in 1980, a short stretch of the Alderdale Subdivision near North Bay was used by the Ontario Northland Railway's Northlander passenger train as a way to connect Ontario Northland's Temagami Subdivision with Toronto in the south via the Huntsville Subdivision (which later became part of the Newmarket Subdivision and then the Bala Subdivision after successive reorganizations of the CN system).

=== Pépin's Axe and end of passenger service ===
In 1981, Via Rail experienced its first wave of significant cuts, sometimes called "Pépin's Axe" in an evocation of the 1960s Beeching Axe in the United Kingdom, under federal Transport Minister Jean-Luc Pépin (a member of Pierre Trudeau's Liberal cabinet), resulting in the cancellation of the Super Continental and making restoration of service along the Alderdale Subdivision increasingly unlikely. This resulted in protests and a political backlash, and after the 1984 election which resulted in the victory of Brian Mulroney's Progressive Conservatives, the Super Continental was partially reinstated, but only between Winnipeg and Vancouver.

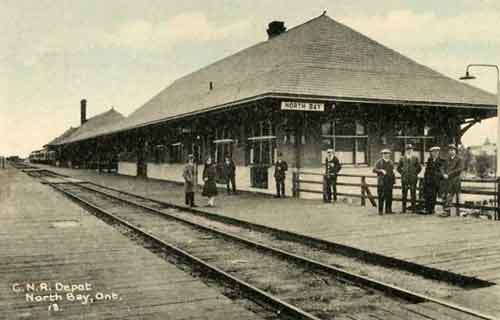
Canadian National Railway station at North Bay, c. 1925.

In 1986, ownership of CN's passenger station in North Bay was transferred to Via Rail. At the time, the station saw traffic from Ontario Northland's daytime Northlander running Sunday to Friday, unnamed Via Rail local trains 120 and 123 which served small communities on Fridays and Sundays between Toronto and North Bay, and an overnight Northland sleeper train which ran daily from Toronto to Hearst. In 1990, passenger services through North Bay were cancelled by Via Rail after severe cuts to its funding by the Canadian federal government. With abandonment of services along the CN line, Ontario Northland built a new intermodal station in 1990 along its own track and relocated its services there.

=== Freight decline ===
Meanwhile, freight traffic along the line had steeply declined, as available timber in the area had been depleted and several of the sawmills had closed. Around 1987–88, the Alderdale Subdivision was abolished as a designation by CN, with the 51.5-mile (82.9 km) section from Brent to Nipissing combined with the Beachburg Subdivision and the 83.3-mile (134.1 km) section from Nipissing to Capreol combined with the Newmarket Subdivision. This situation would be short-lived, however, as in 1995 CN applied to abandon the Beachburg Subdivision west of Pembroke, which included the Beachburg portion of the former Alderdale Subdivision. The application was approved by the Canadian Transportation Agency in 1996 and the tracks were removed shortly after. A number of existing communities along the line were devastated, such as Kiosk, where residents were forced to leave and their houses were demolished by the Ontario Ministry of Natural Resources as they fell within the boundaries of Algonquin Provincial Park.

=== Abandonment and redevelopment ===
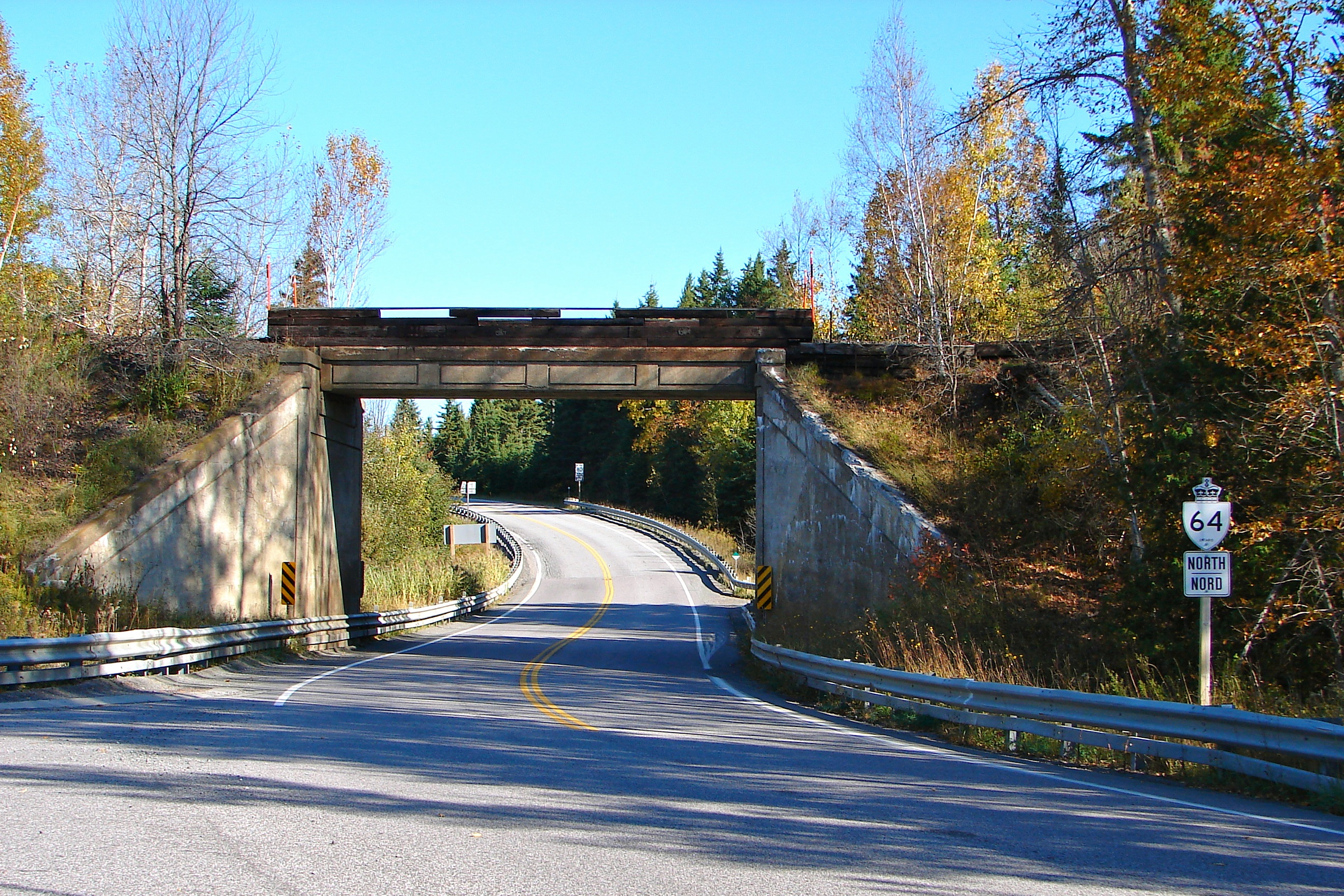
The disused rail bridge over Highway 64 at Field in 2013.

By the early 2000s, a local community group, Rainbow Routes, was organized to promote the conversion of the section from Capreol to North Bay to a rail trail. This was projected to occur in 2001, with a CN Rail transfer of ownership of the disused right of way to the Trans Canada Trail Foundation. However, by 2011, development of the trail had not occurred and was still being pursued by Rainbow Routes.

In 2002, Vic Fedeli was elected Mayor of North Bay. As mayor, he engaged in an aggressive redevelopment policy which saw much of the old CN rail infrastructure dismantled after the right of way was sold to the city for a symbolic $1 sum, including the demolition of many of the rail-over-road trestle bridges around the city in order to widen roads and eliminate "traffic bottlenecks". A development boom ensued, with much of the old railway lands undergoing gentrification. As a result, a large number of single-family detached suburban homes were constructed in neighbourhoods like Pinewood, with some higher-density, more affordable housing also being constructed in other areas.
