= Amable du Fond River =

Amable du Fond
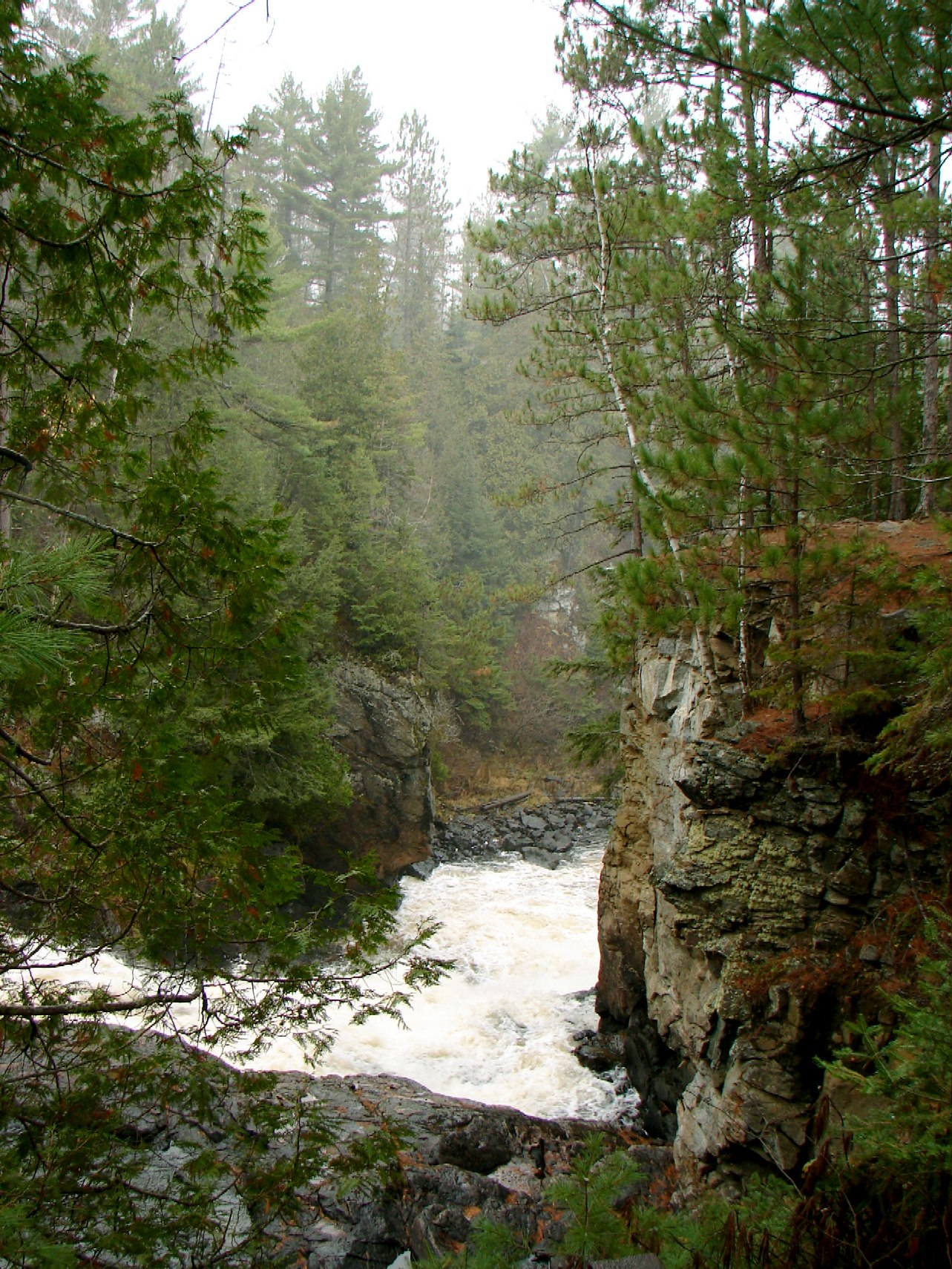
- Eau Claire Gorge

- Location of the mouth of the Amable du Fond River in Ontario

Location
- Country: Canada
- Province: Ontario
- District: Nipissing District

Physical characteristics
- Source: Pipe Lake
  - coordinates: 45°54′03″N 79°05′36″W
  - elevation: 407 m (1,335 ft)
- Mouth: Mattawa River
  - location: Calvin, Ontario
  - coordinates: 46°18′04″N 78°52′44″W
  - elevation: 161 m (528 ft)
- Length: 84 km (52 mi)

Basin features
- Progression: Mattawa River→ Ottawa River→ St. Lawrence River→ Gulf of St. Lawrence

The Amable du Fond River is a river in Nipissing District, in Northern Ontario, Canada.

The river is named after Amable Dufond, a Native hunter and trapper who lived in this area in the mid-19th century. At one time, the river was used to transport logs downstream to the Mattawa River. A timber slide was built to bypass the rapids at the Eau Claire Gorge.

Many canoe trippers use the river as an access point to enter Algonquin Park. However, this route is technically difficult, and requires advanced canoeing skills due to low summer water flow and unmaintained portages and campsites. The park has an access point located on Kawawaymog (Round Lake), from the access point it is just a short paddle and portage into Algonquin Provincial Park.

== Geography ==
The Amable du Fond River flows from Pipe Lake through Kawawaymog, North Tea, Manitou, and Kioshkokwi Lakes in northwestern Algonquin Park to join the Mattawa River on the south side of Samuel de Champlain Provincial Park. It is 84 kilometres (52 mi) long and drops 246 metres (807 ft) over its course.

The Amable du Fond River is the remnant of a short-lived drainage of glacial Lake Algonquin into the Mattawa River valley. It is the largest tributary of the Mattawa River.

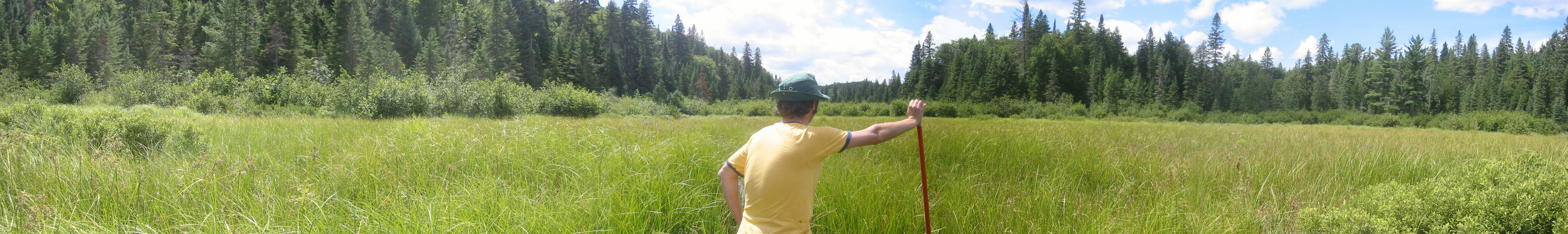
Amable du Fond river in late August (very little water)

== Eau Claire Gorge ==
The Eau Claire Gorge is a cascade where the Amable du Fond flows between 18 metres (59 ft) high rock walls in a series of rapids and waterfalls, dropping 12 metres (39 ft) over 30 metres (98 ft). It is protected in the 120 hectares (300 acres) Eau Claire Gorge Conservation Area, which was purchased by the North Bay-Mattawa Conservation Authority in 1976. There is a 1.9 kilometres (1.2 mi) long trail to view the gorge and conservation area.

== Amable du Fond River Provincial Park ==
Amable du Fond River Provincial Park
- IUCN category II (national park)
- Interactive map of Amable du Fond River Provincial Park
- Coordinates: 46°10′43″N 78°55′03″W
- Area: 731 ha (1,810 acres)
- Designation: Waterway
- Established: 2003
- Governing body: Ontario Parks

The Amable du Fond River Provincial Park is a waterway park that protects several non-contiguous sections of the river and its banks. It also includes some portions of the shores of Smith Lake. It was established in 2006 and is meant to provide a canoe route between Algonquin and Samuel de Champlain Parks. Other activities include hunting, wildlife/nature viewing, and off-roading with ATV's and snowmobiles.

The park features a marsh-fen complex to the north of Smith Lake, as well as balsam fir-spruce, intolerant hardwood, and red pine-spruce scrubland on the shores of Smith Lake and near Crooked Chute Lake. Its vegetation includes black spruce-white cedar-tamarack bottomland, as well as intolerant hardwoods, mixed conifer, cedar-alder stands, and a riverine wetland complex in the southern portion of the park.

It is a non-operating park, meaning that there are no facilities or services.

== See also ==
- List of rivers of Ontario

== Sources ==
- "Amable du Fond River". Geographical Names Data Base. Natural Resources Canada.
- "Topographic Map sheets 31E14, 31E15, 31L2, 31L3, 31L7". Atlas of Canada. Natural Resources Canada. 2006-02-06. Archived from the original on 29 May 2009.
