= Unorganized South Nipissing District =

- Unorganized area
- Nipissing, Unorganized, South Part
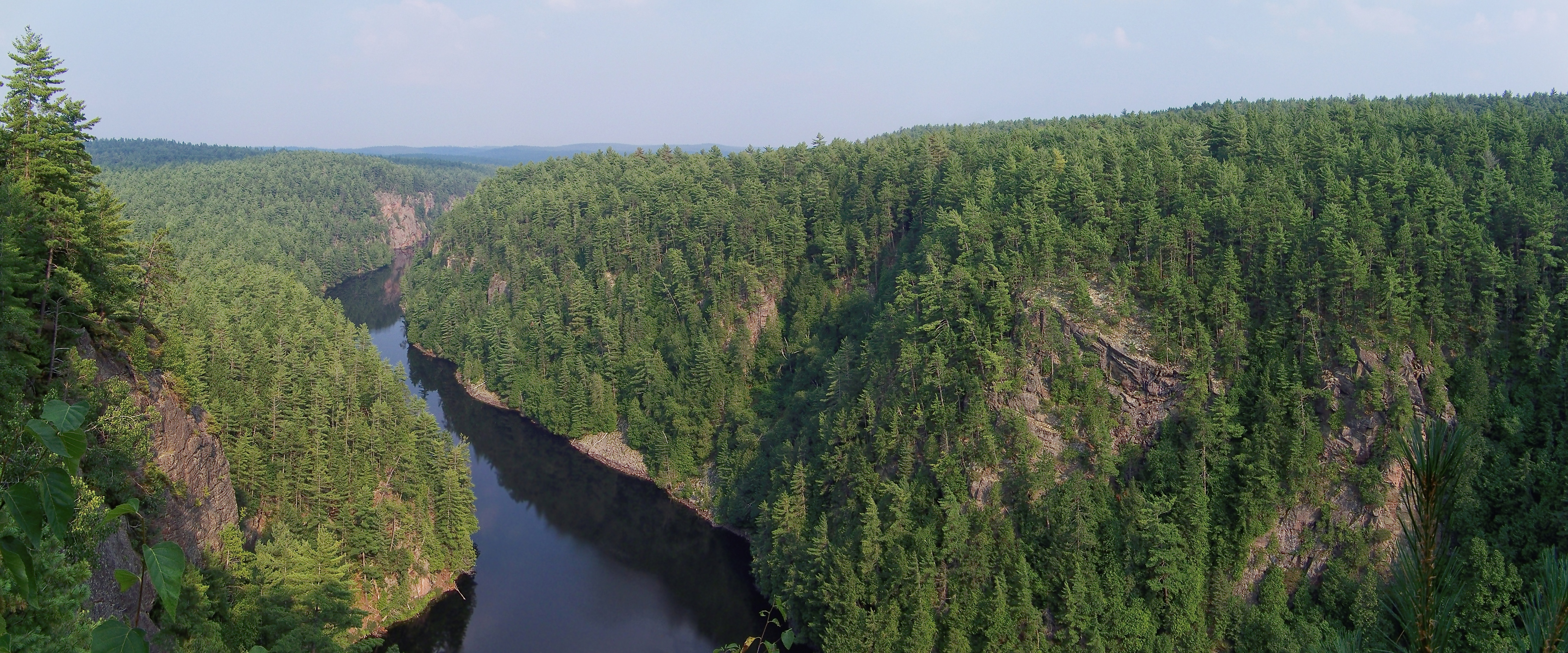
- The Barron Canyon in Algonquin Park

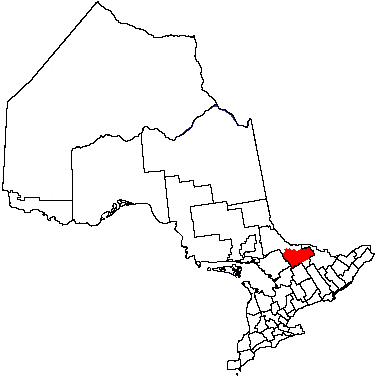
- Coordinates: 45°50′N 78°25′W
- Country: Canada
- Province: Ontario
- District: Nipissing

Government
  - Fed. riding: Algonquin—Renfrew—Pembroke, Nipissing—Timiskaming
  - Prov. riding: Nipissing, Renfrew—Nipissing—Pembroke

Area
  - Land: 6,711.51 km^{2} (2,591.33 sq mi)

Population (2021)
  - Total: 102
  - Density: 0/km^{2} (0/sq mi)
- Time zone: UTC-5 (EST)
  - Summer (DST): UTC-4 (EDT)
- Area code: 705

Unorganized South Nipissing District is an unorganized area in north-central Ontario, in the District of Nipissing. It is almost entirely within and includes most of Algonquin Provincial Park.

The unorganized area is gradually being reduced in size. In 1971, a portion was added to Lake of Bays Township in Muskoka District, and between 1996 and 2001, its area shrunk from 7,792.97 square kilometres (3,008.88 sq mi) to 6,704.68 square kilometres (2,588.69 sq mi), because of annexation by surrounding incorporated townships.

== Geography ==
=== Communities ===
Localities located within the unorganized area are:

- Acanthus
- Achray
- Brent
- Canoe Lake
- Coristine
- Daventry
- Government Park
- Kilrush
- Kiosk
- Lake Traverse
- Mink Lake
- Odenback
- Radiant
- Stuart

=== Townships ===
The following geographic townships are included:

- Anglin
- Ballantyne
- Barron
- Biggar
- Bishop
- Boulter
- Bower
- Boyd
- Bronson
- Butt
- Canisbay
- Clancy
- Deacon
- Devine
- Dickson
- Edgar
- Finlayson
- Fitzgerald
- Freswick
- Guthrie
- Hunter
- Lauder
- Lister
- Master
- McCraney
- McLaughlin
- Niven
- Osler
- Paxton
- Peck
- Pentland
- Preston
- Sproule
- Stratton
- White
- Wilkes

All, except Boulter, Lauder, and parts of Ballantyne, Boyd and Paxton are within Algonquin Provincial Park.

== Demographics ==
Canada census – Nipissing, Unorganized, South Part community profile

	2021	2016	2011
Population	102 (-1.0% from 2016)	103 (28.8% from 2011)	80 (% from 2006)
Land area	6,711.51 km^{2} (2,591.33 sq mi)	6,710.22 km^{2} (2,590.83 sq mi)	6,710.88 km^{2} (2,591.09 sq mi)
Population density	0.0/km^{2} (0/sq mi)	0.0/km^{2} (0/sq mi)	0.0/km^{2} (0/sq mi)
Median age	60.0 (M: 56.8, F: 65.5)	51.5 (M: 41.8, F: 58.5)	52.0 (M: 50.5, F: 53.0)
Private dwellings	337 (total) 46 (occupied)	273 (total) 38 (occupied)	138 (total)
Median household income	$n/a	$55,040

References: 2021 2016 2011

Historical census populations – Unorganized South Nipissing District

Year	Pop.	±%
1976	947	—
1981	680	−28.2%
1986	717	+5.4%
1991	628	−12.4%
1996	636	+1.3%

Year	Pop.	±%
2001	51	−92.0%
2006	67	+31.4%
2011	80	+19.4%
2016	103	+28.8%
2021	102	−1.0%

Population counts are not adjusted for boundary changes.
Source: Statistics Canada

=== Population distribution ===
Most of the population lives outside of Algonquin Park on the northern or northwestern fringes of the region. According to the 2016 Census, the blocks that encompass the Townships of Boulter, Lauder, Pentland and Boyd had a combined population of 57. The area around Loxton Lake in Ballantyne Township (Census Block 35480228012) had a population of 26. Census Block 35480228215 which covers parts of Bronson and Stratton Townships in the Northeast corner of Algonquin Park had a population of 5, while 15 people lived in Census Block 35480228146 which covers most of the western part of the region.

== See also ==
- List of townships in Ontario
