= Ontario Place =

Entertainment venue and lakeside park in Toronto

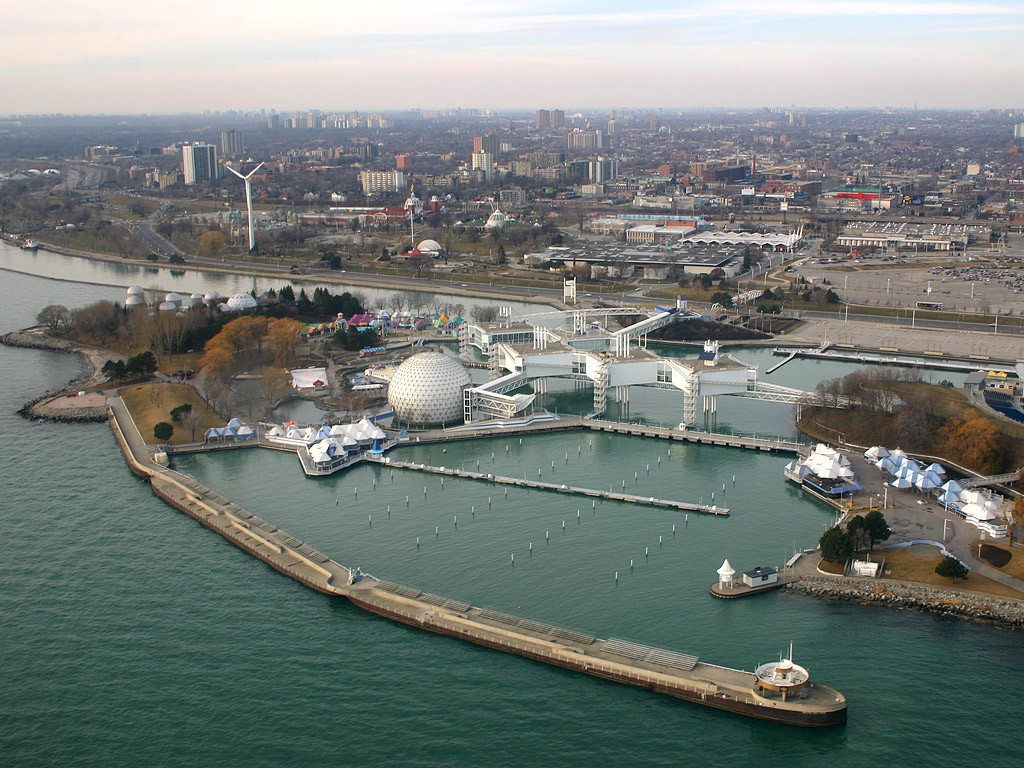
- Aerial overview of Ontario Place, 2006
- Interactive map of Ontario Place
- Type: Park incorporating entertainment and event venues
- Location: Toronto, Ontario, Canada
- Coordinates: 43.629°N 79.417°W
- Area: 155 acres (62.73 ha)
- Created: May 22, 1971; 55 years ago
- Owner: Government of Ontario
- Operator: Ontario Place Corporation
- Website: www.ontarioplace.com

Ontario Place was an entertainment venue, event venue, and park in Toronto, Ontario, Canada. The venue is located on three artificial landscaped islands just off-shore in Lake Ontario, south of Exhibition Place, and southwest of Downtown Toronto. It opened on May 22, 1971, and operated as a theme park centred around Ontario themes and family attractions until 2012 when the Government of Ontario announced that it would close for redevelopment. It has since reopened as a park without an admission fee but without several of the old attractions. The Government of Ontario has made a controversial plan to place the 145 acres on a 95-year lease with the Austrian spa builder Therme Group without environmental assessments.

Since the closure as a theme park, several of the venue's facilities have remained open, once reopened, and one section was redeveloped. The RBC Amphitheatre operates during the summer season. The Cinesphere, the original IMAX theatre, reopened with new projection equipment and shows films regularly; although it is currently closed for renovations. On the East Island, Trillium Park and the William G Davis Trail opened in 2017. A marina, sheltered by three sunken lake freighters, operates seasonally at the site. The exhibit "pods", several pavilions suspended above a lagoon, have remained closed after the closure of the Atlantis event facility. While much of the West Island's facilities are permanently closed, some of the natural spaces are now being used for recreation. Occasionally special events are hosted in the west island village.

== History ==
The Ontario Place theme park operated annually during the summer months from 1971 until 2011. Designed originally to promote the province of Ontario through exhibits and entertainment, its focus changed over time to be that of a theme park for families with a water park, a children's play area, and amusement rides. Exhibits in the pods were discontinued and the pods became a venue for private events. The Forum concert stage had long been a primary draw to Ontario Place in its early years as it offered free concerts by a wide variety of prominent artists, for free with the price of admission to the park. Structured as a true amphitheater with seating on all sides and a recessed stage that was round and revolved during concerts, all seats offered an equal view of the stage and were offered on a first come first served basis. In the 1990s, despite the vocal protests of Eb Zeidler, the architect of the park among others, the Forum was torn down and replaced by the (misleadingly named) Amphitheatre, in truth a static proscenium arch stage with banked ticketed seating. After a long period of declining attendance, the Government of Ontario closed the facility except for its music venue and marina after the 2011 season.

=== Background ===
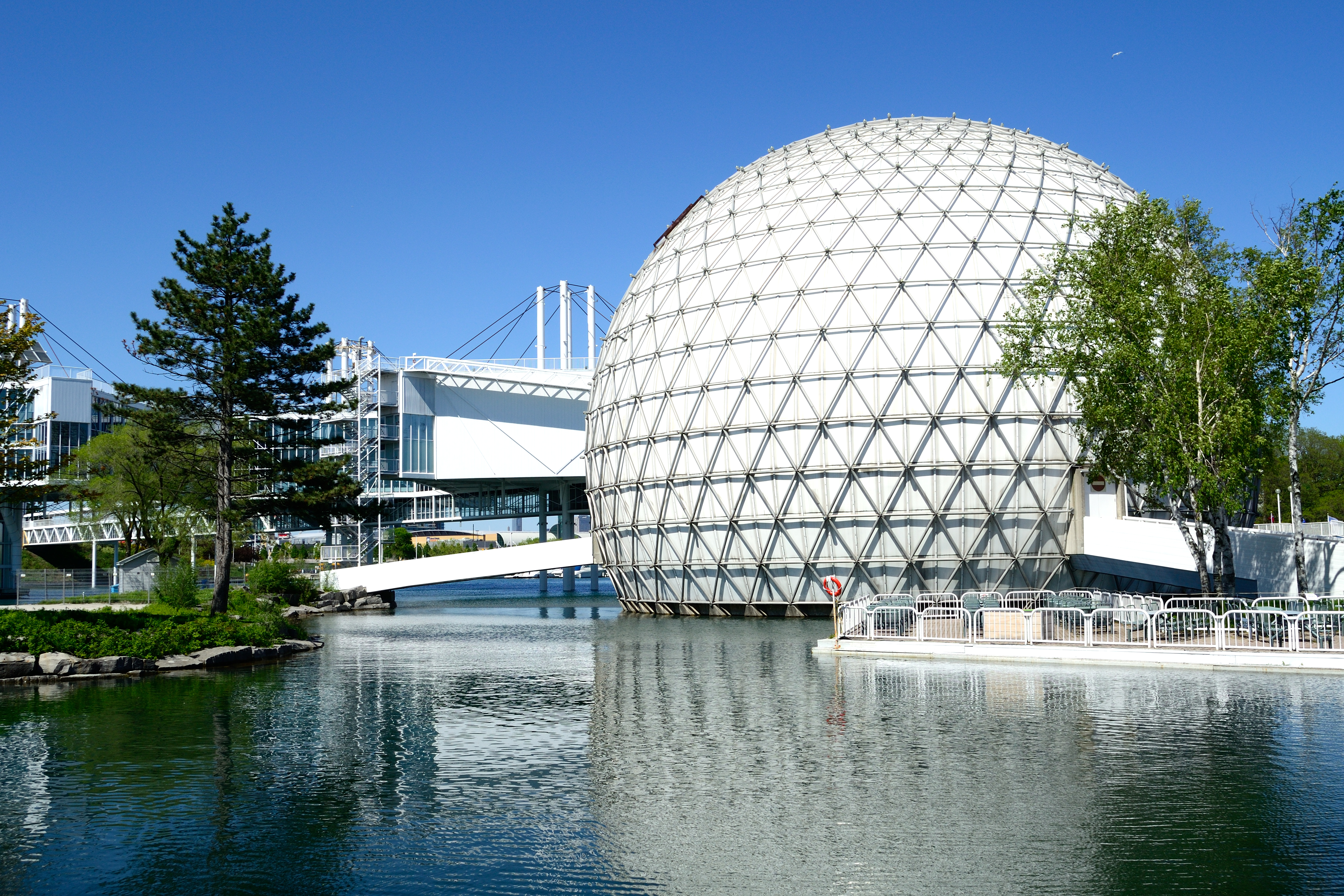
Cinesphere at Ontario Place

Built in 1926, the CNE Ontario Government Building displayed exhibits about Ontario at the annual Canadian National Exhibition (CNE). After the success of the Ontario Pavilion at Expo 67 in Montreal, the Government of Ontario decided to replace the CNE building with a new state-of-the-art showcase. The government at first considered moving the Ontario Pavilion to a site on Toronto Island but instead decided at the instigation of Jim Ramsay, to build a facility elsewhere on the waterfront. Ontario Premier John Robarts announced the project at the opening of the CNE in August 1968.

We shall utilize the natural setting of the waterfront, modern structural designs, and hope to create the mood of gaiety and openness which helped make so popular the Ontario Pavilion at Expo '67

— Ontario Premier John Robarts,

The park itself was originally conceived as an onshore exhibit, but this idea was discarded in favour of five large, architecturally unique, three-level pods in an aquatic setting somewhat similar in concept to Montreal's Expo 67 grounds (which were in the middle of the Saint Lawrence River). Each pod would be approximately 8,000 square feet (740 m^{2}) in area, and suspended by steel cables from four large central pylons driven deep into the lake bed. These pods initially housed various Ontario-themed exhibits. The first model displayed to the government dismayed director Jim Ramsay:

The first time we saw it was in October 1968, when the architects brought in this small model and laid it before us. It was nothing but a few pieces of balsa wood, some pieces of black plastic and a half tennis ball sticking up. I remember thinking 'Oh my God – what's this we're getting?'

— Jim Ramsay, executive director of Ontario Place,

The original plans were estimated to cost CA$13 million to construct. Plans for the facility grew to include the Forum outdoor amphitheater, marina, nine restaurants, nine snack bars, three land rides, pedal and tour boats and an additional 33 acres (13 ha) of landfill.

=== Design and construction ===
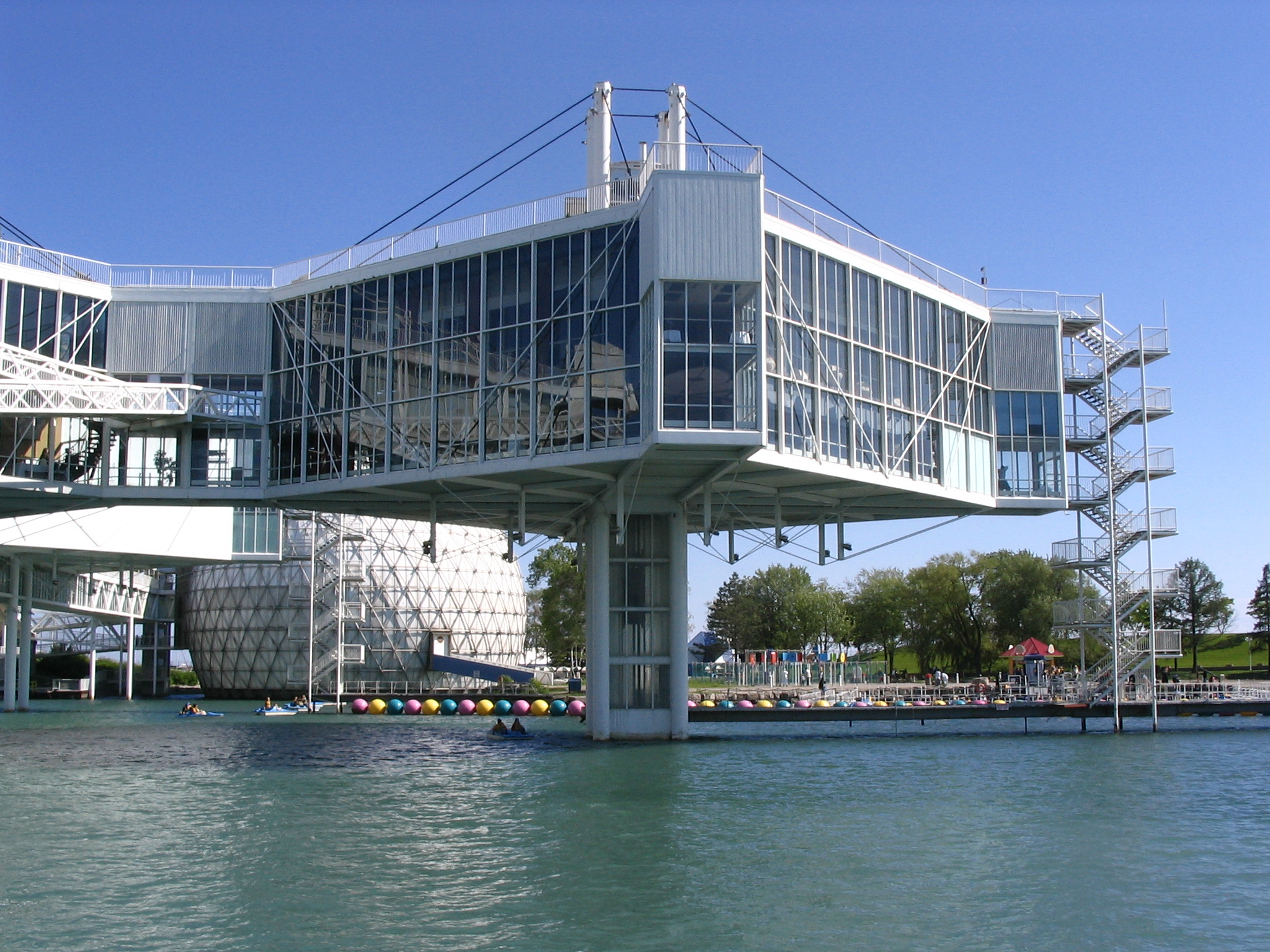
Ontario Place pods

The park was built by the Ontario Department of Trade and Development. The architects were Craig, Zeidler and Strong, the structural engineers were Gordon Dowdell Associates, the landscape architects were Hough, Stansbury and Associates, and the general contractor was Secant Construction. Construction started on March 17, 1969.

During the design phase, a difficult design problem developed. The cost of the open-water pod foundations alone (at the time, estimated at CA$9 million) would consume almost the entire budget for the pods' construction. Architect Eb Zeidler was faced with a dilemma: how to construct the pods without the necessary budget. Zeidler developed an innovative solution: after a trip to the Caribbean, he realized that a "barrier reef" concept would cut down on wave action from the lake enough to reduce the cost of the pods' foundation to 1/10 of the original open-water estimate. After some quarrels with the Toronto Harbour Commission (due to the dangers of the unseen reef to shipping), the reef plan was modified to incorporate three artificial "barrier islands" made from city landfill.

The five steel and aluminum pavilion pods are square with 88-foot (27 m) sides. Each pod is supported by four pipe columns, rising 105 feet (32 m) above the lake. Tension cables support the short-span trusses. They sit on concrete filled caissons, driven 30 feet (9.1 m) into the lake's bedrock. Each of the pavilions is connected to one another and the land by glazed steel bridges. Ontario Place was designed to have a modular use and appearance. Zeidler says that the structures were designed to "give an illusion of dimensionless space, exploiting technology to shape the society of tomorrow".

The Forum, an outdoor concert venue, was featured on a central hub-island, while a children's village would occupy an eastern island. A commercial section overlooked the water, with modular construction for shops and restaurants to the west. All would be connected by an intricately planned set of walkways and bridges. In addition, each island would have a unique colour scheme, and the entire complex was later infused with the brilliant colours and graphic design that was typical of the late 1960s and early 1970s. The children's village was designed by Eric McMillan and cost $700,000.

The Forum theatre sat 2,000 and had additional grass 'seats' to host 6,000 people. The roof structure was a hyperbolic paraboloid positioned on cement bastions. It covered a 68-foot (21 m) revolving stage, giving near 360 degree sightlines. The roof was made out of tongue and groove plywood, covered by copper sheathing.

Landscape architect Michael Hough overlaid a scale model of the University of Toronto's walking paths onto the Ontario Place plans to check for appropriate walking distances. This ensured that comfortable rest areas were placed appropriately so that children and the elderly would not need to walk too far without a comfortable seat. Ontario Place operated a rubber-wheeled tractor train and a boat to take visitors between key points on the various islands.

Prevailing wind and wave conditions were also considered in the design, a scale model of which was tested in the University of Toronto's wind tunnel. Large earthwork berms planted with tall native Ontario trees were created to shelter walkways from the prevailing southwesterly winds. To the south, a cost-effective and theme-congruent plan to sink three large obsolete Great Lakes shipping vessels was implemented, which sheltered the artificial harbour from intense open-lake waves. (The same technique would later be used on Toronto Island and the Outer Harbour.) The first phase of construction was the sinking of the ships onto a stone bed, then covered in concrete forming a 1,500-foot (460 m) long breakwater. Once the perimeter was finished, work began on the 50 acres (20 ha) of the three artificial islands.

A marina was included in the project, holding up to 292 boats up to 40 feet (12 m) in length. There was originally some controversy about allowing a public facility to house an upscale boating dock within the new artificial harbour. Supporters of the plan believed that the dock's integration into Ontario Place would tie the location closer to the lake via boating activity, and improve the general ambience.

At Expo 70 in Osaka, Japan, the new IMAX movie technology was first exhibited. A great success, it was decided to build the first permanent IMAX installation at Ontario Place. The Cinesphere, an 800-seat theatre, was built. Its building is a 'spherical triodetic dome', with a 61-foot (19 m) outer radius, and a 56-foot (17 m) inner radius. The dome is supported by prefabricated steel aluminum alloy tubes.

The design of Ontario Place has won a long list of awards including ones from the International Committee for Documentation and Conservation of Buildings of the Modern Movement, the Royal Architectural Institute of Canada, The National Trust — Prix du XXe Siècle, and the American Society of Landscape Architects. In 2014, the Ontario government's Ministry of Culture, Tourism and Sport declared Ontario Place to be a "cultural heritage landscape of provincial significance".

=== Opening ===
When Ontario Place opened on May 22, 1971, the eastern island's children's village was not yet built, postponed to July, and finally opened for the 1972 season. Initially estimated at CA$13 million, the final cost of construction of Ontario Place was CA$29 million ($228 million in 2025 dollars) after plans grew to encompass more features and attractions. Opening day attendance was 23,000 The park's initial size was 360,000 square metres (89 acres), 206,000 square metres (51 acres) created by landfill. The first-year admission price: $1.00 for adults, $0.50 for students, $0.25 for children 6–12

To celebrate the opening of the theme park and promote the province of Ontario, a multi-media exhibition was created and presented inside the pavilion. Dolores Claman wrote the music and Richard Morris wrote lyrics for the music to this presentation, entitled "Theme from Ontario Place". "Theme from Ontario Place" was subsequently released by the Ontario Department of Trade and Development as a double-sided 45 rpm vinyl record. It was manufactured by Quality Records (OP1971), side A containing a "Pop" version and Side B an "Easy Listening" recording. A photo of the still under construction Ontario Place was used on the cover. The purpose-built Imax theatre premiered a specially commissioned film North of Superior, an 18-minute film depicting life in Northern Ontario and its first season over 1.1 million people viewed the film.

In its first year, attendance was 2.5 million. The park had higher than expected costs and ran a deficit of $2.2 million. Winter screenings at Cinesphere were "financially successful". The Government of Ontario raised the admission from $1 to $1.50 for adults and 50 cents to 75 cents for youth. Manager James Ramsay was replaced and returned to the Ministry of Trade and Development. Two government-run restaurants that had lost money were leased to a private operator for the second season. During the first year, visitors to the CNE had to pay admission to enter Ontario Place. Starting in the second year, admission to the CNE included free admission to Ontario Place.

=== Changes over time ===
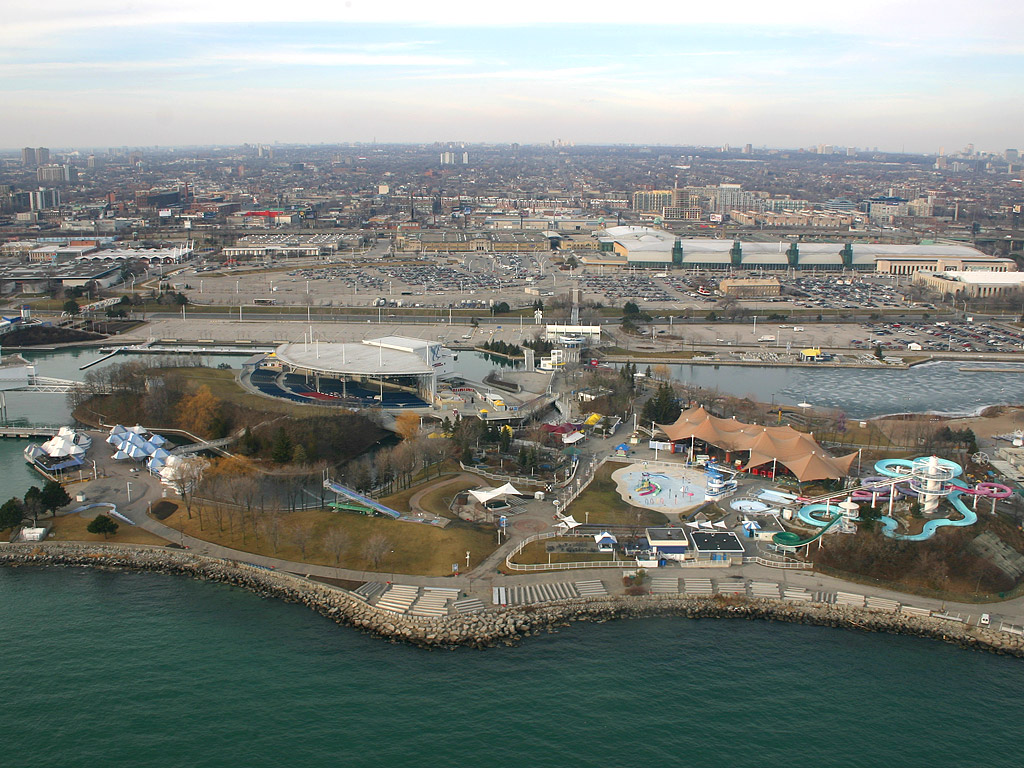
Molson Amphitheatre and Ontario Place waterpark

The park was altered considerably since its inception. Redevelopment occurred on all three islands of the park; the pod buildings themselves were eventually closed to exhibit space and rented out as the "Atlantis" private event facility.

In 1980, the "Ontario North Now" exhibit was built on the west island to showcase Northern Ontario. It was a combination of inter-connected silo-like buildings, topped with domes reminiscent of the Cinesphere, connected by overhead walkways, and a smaller domed movie theatre. In 1984, a boat-based water ride was added, along with a smaller exhibition centre consisting of three concrete silo-like buildings. A large reflecting pool nearby was drained and used to house the addition of a major "climber" structure, a smaller stage for kids shows and several other kid-oriented attractions, reducing the complete separation of areas that had been featured in the original design.

The outdoor in-the-round concert stage, The Forum, was torn down and replaced with the CA$15 million Molson Amphitheatre in 1995, a much larger facility based on a bandshell design. An additional "Echo Beach" outdoor music venue was added to the north shore of the east island in 2011.

On the east island, the original children's area, which was primarily "non-powered", has largely been removed. The large wood-and-rope climber area was replaced with the large "Soak City" waterpark, the first water park in Ontario. Several small fair-ground rides were later added. The large tension structure tent that covered most of the children's park was removed in 2009/10, leaving a large open area with a new stage. Many of the concrete bollards used to secure the various tents and structures can still be seen.

=== Operating deficit and attendance ===
Although proposed as a tourist attraction to promote Ontario, the park's subsidy nevertheless was a consistent concern of the Government of Ontario. The first season ran a deficit of $2.2 million, which led to an increase in admission prices the following season. In 1978, Ontario Place ran a deficit of $2.75 million while still charging $2.50 for adult admission. In the seasons of 1988 and 1989, Patti Starr, Ontario Place chair, reduced the deficit by $1.4 million by privatizing retail sales and fast-food operations, cutting advertising and increasing fees. In 1994, the Forum was torn down for the larger Molson Amphitheatre, in part to reduce the park's $4.5 million annual deficit. In 1997, Ontario Place's general manager Max Beck suggested a merger with Exhibition Place to save money. Federal Finance Minister Jim Flaherty proposed selling off Ontario Place. In 2003, the subsidy was $3 million.

Attendance was another concern for park management and new attractions were regularly introduced to gain new interest. Attendance declined from 3 million annually in the 1970s, to 2.5 million in 1985, 2.1 million in 1989. By 2004, attendance had declined to one million annually. The Ontario Government appointed former Toronto Mayor David Crombie to revitalize the park. In its last summer operating season, attendance was 563,000.

When the Ontario Gaming Commission was proposing a casino in downtown Toronto in 2012, one site mentioned was Ontario Place as a solution to declining attendance and revenues. The downtown casino was eventually stopped by opposition at Toronto City Council. The casino idea was also opposed by border cities in Ontario with existing casinos.

=== 2010 refurbishment ===
From the fall of 2010 through to the fall of 2011, over $10 million was spent on improvements. These included:

- a significant refreshing and expansion of the waterpark. Froster Soak City added a new "family" waterslide, an outdoor "spa pool" and waterfall, and over 100 metres of newly landscaped beach and public promenades. These upgrades expanded Soak City's variety and added new views of the Toronto downtown waterfront. The new slide, called "Topsy Turvy", was purchased from ProSlide Technology of Ottawa, Ontario. Topsy Turvy was recognized as the "2010 Best New Waterslide" from the International Association of Amusement Parks and Attractions (IAAPA). The installation of Topsy Turvy and the engineering systems needed for its operation was completed in October 2011, too late for the 2011 final season;
- upgrades to the Cinesphere. The original projection system was replaced by state-of-the-art IMAX 3D film technology by Toronto architecture firm Gow Hastings Architects, making Cinesphere the largest 3D theatre in Canada and second largest in North America. New sound systems, seats, concession areas, and interiors were also added;
- introduction of an "in-habitat" ecology, conservation, and animal care exhibit called the Eco-Learning Centre. A former arcade building, founded and created by Jaime Carnevale, the Eco-Learning Centre was established in a lagoon area of Ontario Place as a fun and informative "edutainment" attraction, and was created with displays by the World Wildlife Fund, the Toronto and Region Conservation Authority, the Royal Ontario Museum, Parks Canada, the Toronto Humane Society, The Recycling Council of Ontario, The Toronto Wildlife Centre, Earth Rangers and the Ministry of Natural Resources. The Eco-Learning Centre attracted over 300,000 visitors in its first year of operation.
- construction of Echo Beach
- general cleanliness of the park was also upgraded significantly, including the removal of over 1,000 feet (300 m) of obsolete fencing.

Investments were made in entertainment, marketing and sponsorship for the 40th-anniversary celebrations. Free grounds admission was offered to the public for the first time in 20 years. Live entertainment performances were quadrupled, to over 2,000. Advertising was reinstated, with a new ad campaign developed by Draft FCB of Toronto. A significant sponsorship of the 40th birthday celebration by CTV generated over $1,500,000 in extra advertising value. Ontario Place was recognized in 2011 by IAAPA as a worldwide finalist for a "Brass Ring Award" in the category of "Best Integrated Marketing Campaign".

The results of this effort generated an improvement in attendance numbers, park revenues, and public perceptions of Ontario Place in 2011. Total park attendance increased 9% to 880,001 despite a below average year for concerts at the Molson Canadian Amphitheatre and a decline in cross-over attendance from the Canadian National Exhibition. Core park attendance increased by 72% to 563,362. First-time visitor attendance increased even more, at 89%. Revenues in all categories increased by double-digit figures, despite the fact that there was no charge for actual admission to the grounds.

Scores from interview-based research into visitor perceptions also improved strongly. Favourable response to the question, "Ontario Place has changed for the better", increased by 43%, as did, "Ontario Place is my favourite entertainment park in the GTA", at 50% up. Perceptions of park cleanliness and general upkeep improved, by 34% and 37%, respectively.

=== Closure of theme park and redevelopment ===
In the summer of 2010, the Government of Ontario issued a Request for information calling for ideas from private bidders to completely redevelop the park. Ontario Place general manager Tim Casey told the Toronto Star: "2011 will be our 40th anniversary. It definitely needs a revitalization, that's no surprise. It's a blank slate, we’re open to just about anything.” A formal Request for proposals process began that fall. The government intends to transform the park from a largely seasonal facility to a year-round attraction. The redevelopment was to have included the tearing down of the Cinesphere as well as other long-standing attractions.

On February 1, 2012, the government announced that the public sections of the park would be closed and redeveloped, with a target date of 2017, the year of Canada's 150th anniversary. John Tory was announced as the chair of a Minister's Advisory Panel on Revitalization. All Ontario Place facilities were closed except for the marina, the Molson Canadian Amphitheatre, the Atlantis entertainment venue and parking.

Following the provincial elections in June 2014, the government announced the plans in July for Ontario Place to be developed as an urban parkland with Molson Canadian Amphitheatre, Cinesphere and the pods retained.

The West Channel at Ontario Place was a venue for the 2015 Pan American Games (Athletics -marathon/race walk, cycling (road race), triathlon (cycling/run), open water swimming, triathlon (swim), water skiing and 2015 Parapan American Games (Cycling)). Minor and temporary upgrades were made to accommodate use during the games. Construction was begun in March on the park and a waterfront path, which was named the William G. Davis Trail, after the Ontario premier who opened the original Ontario Place in 1971.

In 2017, portions of the East Island were transformed from a parking lot into Trillium Park. The new park included the 1.3 km (0.81 mi) William G. Davis Trail, which opened in June 2017. In November 2017, the Cinesphere re-opened with showings of Dunkirk and North of Superior as part of a regular schedule of weekend programming. The Cinesphere's screen was replaced and a new "IMAX with laser" projector was installed.

In early 2018, the Government of Ontario led by Liberal Premier Kathleen Wynne solicited proposals as to new purposes for Ontario Place, but those could not include condominiums or a casino. After the Progressive Conservatives were elected in June, an announcement was made of plans to dissolve the Ontario Place Corporation. This follows the province indicating interest in establishing a casino on the lands. In November, Finance Minister Vic Fedeli suggested that the government was open to considering a new purpose for the park, without the restrictions that had been set by the previous government.

In December 2018, the Government of Ontario appointed James Ginou, a Toronto businessman and Progressive Conservative fund-raiser, as the new chair of the Board of Ontario. He had previously served in the position from 1997 until 2003. In 2019, the Government of Ontario announced that it would develop a rapid-transit line (the "Ontario Line") connecting Ontario Place to downtown Toronto and further north-east to the Ontario Science Centre. The line is targeted to open in 2027.

In May 2019, at an announcement held in the Cinesphere, the Government of Ontario released a call for proposals to redevelop Ontario Place with "big, bold ideas". Proposals must not include residential units, a casino and must not require a specific monetary outlay or subsidy by the Government of Ontario. Proposals must preserve the existing amount of parkland included in the Trillium Park, preserve the existing Budweiser Stage, but otherwise permit any type of changes, subject to approval.

Also in May 2019, Toronto city council voted 25–0 to list Ontario Place on Toronto's heritage property register. The listing does not offer any legal protections.

World Monuments Fund included Ontario Place on its 2020 World Monuments Watch program alongside 24 heritage sites around the globe “in need of timely or urgent action”. In response to the province of Ontario's international call for development proposals, the WMF listing demanded “an end to top-down decision-making and the embrace of heritage to encourage community dialogue”. Following the Watch inclusion, World Monuments Fund partnered with the Architectural Conservancy Ontario and the Faculty of Architecture, Landscape and Design at the University of Toronto to protect the heritage values of Ontario Place through an initiative called "The Future of Ontario Place Project". Through a research initiative, design challenge, and public campaign, the Future of Ontario Place Project started working in 2020 to build public knowledge of the heritage values of the site, and to imagine the future of Ontario Place as a public cultural asset for all Ontarians.

=== 2021 plan ===
In July 2021, development plans were announced. Two companies are to redevelop different sectors:

- LiveNation (which already operates music venues at the site) will revamp the Budweiser Stage Amphitheatre into an indoor/outdoor facility with a capacity of up to 20,000 people in the summer and nearly 9,000 in winter.
- Austrian company Therme Group will develop the west island. A new large facility will cover most of the island. The facility will include indoor and outdoor pools, a spa, waterslides, restaurants and botanical garden. Outside of the facility, it will build a 12 acres (4.9 ha) public park and beach. The projected admission price for indoor activities is about $40 per person for full day admittance.

A third company proposed to build a zip-line and adventure park but pulled out of the project. The company and the government could not come to terms on the lease.

Private sector investments are expected to be about $500-million. Public sector investment was not disclosed. A review process for environmental, heritage, and public consultation, will likely extend into 2023. Construction is scheduled to begin in 2024, with a 2030 completion.

In February 2022, Toronto city council voted to adopt a process to create an approvals process for the Province's plan for the redevelopment of Ontario Place. This process generally follows the city's traditional development approvals process, notwithstanding Ontario Place is predominately constructed on Provincially-owned land. Based on this timeline, a rezoning application is expected in late 2022 and a site plan approvals process began in 2023.

The Cinesphere was closed for renovations. In September 2022, the ministry reported: “Repair work on the Cinesphere, pods, and bridges is proceeding on-schedule this fall. Site servicing, including sewage, water, electrical, and gas, is expected to begin in the spring of 2023."

Therme Canada's local partners are the Toronto International Film Festival (TIFF), Mississaugas of the Credit First Nation, Black North Initiative. TIFF later 'paused' their relationship with Therme ahead of their 2023 festival. Other partners include AECON Group Inc., Diamond Schmitt, and Studio TLA. Strategy Corp, is serving Therme Canada with strategy and communications. Formerly, Swim Drink Fish Canada was a partner, but has exited the partnership in the belief that the government's portion of the plan is "simply too opaque and controversial for us to support".

Therme's plans have received strong public backlash, with the group Ontario Place for All leading the campaign against the development. Plans to develop the public space and existing beach by a for-profit private developer became a prominent 2023 election issue in Toronto. The mayoral campaign saw mayor Olivia Chow come out in opposition to the project. Later in 2023, she dropped her opposition to the project when the City and Government of Ontario reached an agreement for the transfer of the two Toronto freeways (Don Valley and Gardiner) to the province, saving the city an estimated $1.2 billion. The community group has continued its opposition, attempting to stop or slow down the project in the courts.

The Ford government has proposed to move the Ontario Science Centre to the site. It would sit atop a large parking garage that would serve the Therme spa. The centre would also incorporate the pods as exhibit space, and the Cinesphere. The proposed move has been controversial. On February 26, 2026, the government unveiled the final design for the new and larger 400,000 sq. ft. facility which includes doubling the size of the iconic dome shaped IMAX venue Cinesphere. Construction of the $1B (CAD) facility is expected to begin in Spring 2026 with a completion date in 2029.

==== Auditor General's Report ====
In December 2024, the Auditor General of Ontario's annual report included analysis of the redevelopment of Ontario Place and described the selection process as "not fair, transparent or accountable." It found that the Ford government had frequently broken its own selection rules even though those rules were less stringent than normal provincial procurement standards since it allowed the government to select bids that failed to meet the specified criteria. The AG's report further criticized the process for lacking transparency around assessment criteria which discouraged participant investment in the process while officials from the premier's office, ministerial offices, and Infrastructure Ontario communicated with and advised on favoured bidders. The report also found that the public cost had gone up by $1.8 billion since the start of the process in 2019 to $2.2 billion.

The park is profiled in Ali Weinstein's 2024 documentary film Your Tomorrow.

== Venues and facilities ==
The park is open daily without admission accessible by the west entrance and the Trillium Park entrance. Several venues operate with separate ticketing. The eastern entrance is used exclusively for the RBC Amphitheatre.

=== RBC Amphitheatre ===
RBC Amphitheatre is a 16,000-person capacity outdoor concert venue. The stage and the inner seating area is covered by a permanent roof. The Stage operates a summer season of popular music concerts. It was formerly known as the Molson Amphitheatre and the Budweiser Stage.

=== Cinesphere ===
Cinesphere is a 600-person capacity IMAX and IMAX3D theatre. Opened at the same time as the theme park, it screens a selection of IMAX films on weekends. It also has been used by the Toronto International Film Festival. It is an "IMAX with laser" and 70mm film theatre. The theatre is housed in a "triodetic-domed" spherical structure, similar to a geodesic dome.

=== Echo Beach ===
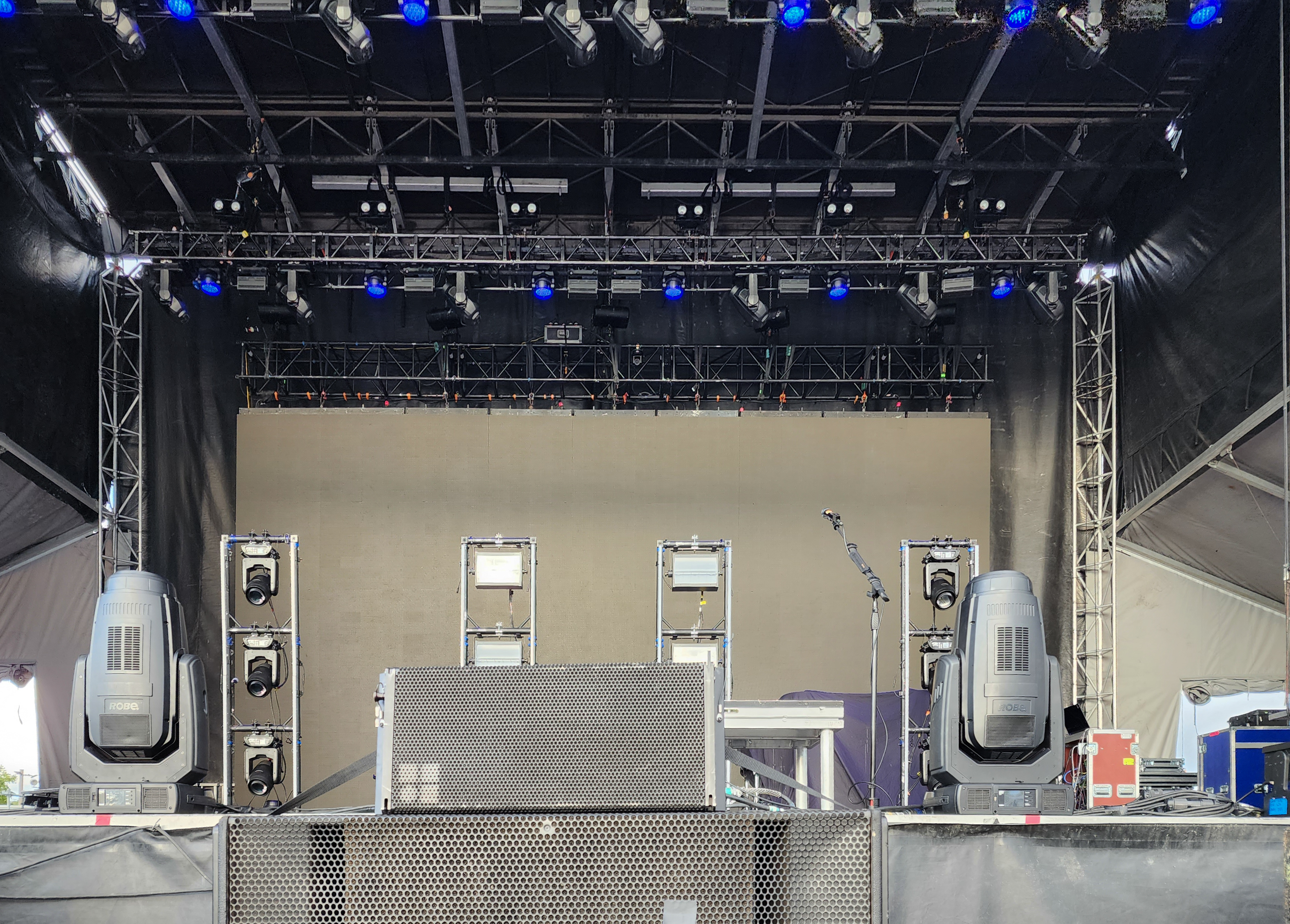
The stage at RBC Echo Beach

Developed with concert promoter Live Nation, Echo Beach is a 5000-person general-admission outdoor concert venue designed to help re-create the popular ambience of the original Ontario Place Forum, minus the revolving stage but introducing a real sandy beach section with views of the Toronto nighttime skyline. Some of the first performers Echo Beach in 2011 included Sloan, Robyn and Platinum Blonde. The Toronto Life magazine wrote, "The new Echo Beach is a reason to love Toronto because music sounds better under the stars". For 2012, based on strong reviews and rising attendance, Live Nation increased substantially the number of concerts scheduled for Echo Beach, including Our Lady Peace, Sam Roberts, and Counting Crows. In May 2017, Live Nation signed a sponsorship deal with the Royal Bank of Canada, resulting in the venue being renamed RBC Echo Beach.

=== TeachBeach ===
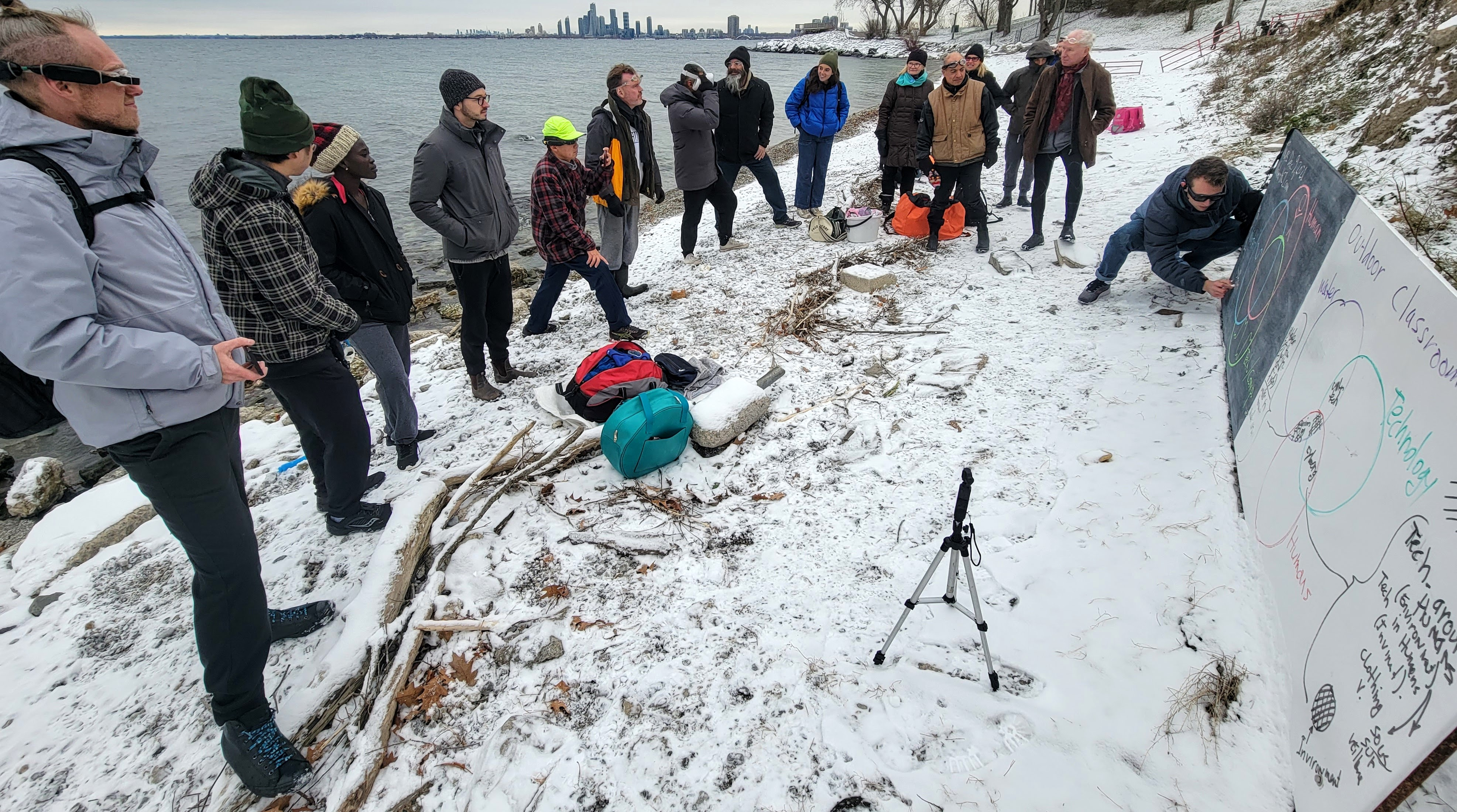
Presentation of the 23rd annual Water-Human-Computer Interface DECONference by Cayden Pierce at the outdoor classroom, TeachBeach, at Ontario Place

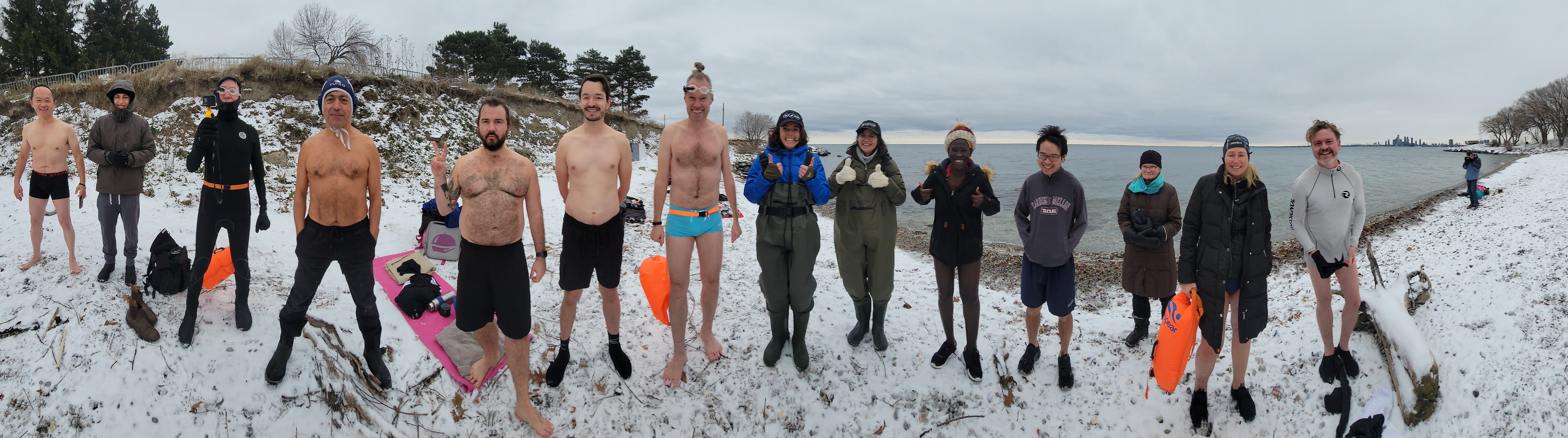
TeachBeach in the wintertime, winter swimmers, SwimDrinkFish, Lake Ontario Waterkeeper

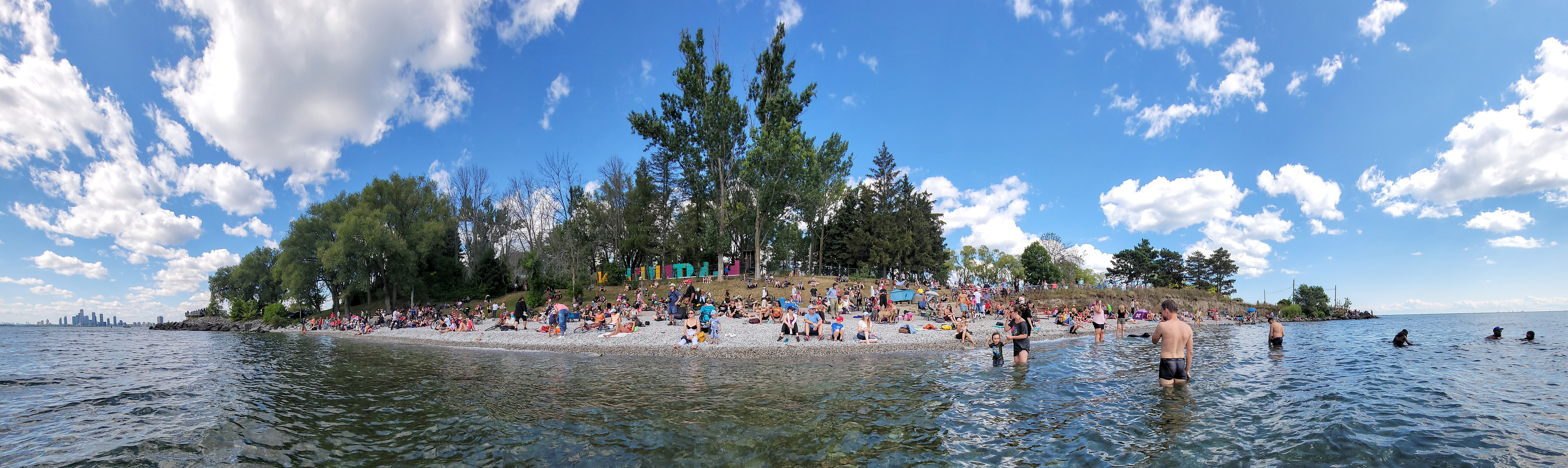
Swimming and sunbathing at the TeachBeach in early September 2021

Following the government closure of Ontario Place a group of local residents established what they called "an outdoor classroom (known as the "TeachBeach"). While unsanctioned by government, organizers also made this a venue of the annual Water-Human-Computer Interaction (WaterHCI) (de)conference. The beach was a popular location for year-round swimming with approximately 900 members of SwimOP (Swim at Ontario Place). The swimming water quality is tested regularly year-round by Swim Drink Fish, was is the site for a wide range of educational and research activities.

=== Other facilities ===
Ontario Place offers 240 slips for pleasure craft in two marinas. It offers slips for seasonal and visit rentals. The marinas are open between May and October.

Trillium Park is a newly developed park on the East Island. The park provides a trail, a firepit, a picnic/meeting shelter and some special plantings.

While not full redeveloped, one area of the West Island has been repurposed. It is used for cultural festivals and events. A skating rink operates during winter months and boat rentals operate during the summer months.

== Former attractions ==
=== Children's Village ===
Not ready for the first season, the Children's Village opened in July 1972, built at a cost of $700,000 on the East Island. Occupying about 2 acres, the active playground offered large nets to climb on, tube slides, a "foam swamp" of foam pieces below a plastic sheet, a "pogo-bird bounce", "punch-bag forest", a plastic climbing pyramid, a rubber forest, a large air mattress to jump on, and a total of 21 activities. Half of the village was covered by a 40,000 square feet (3,700 m^{2}) bright orange vinyl canopy. The Village was designed by Eric MacMillan. The Village changed over time, and the active activities were replaced by the water park and amusements on the East Island. The roofed area was closed and replaced by Heritage Square which had live entertainment. Children's activities were also developed on the West Island, including a large climbing facility, games, creative activities and rides.

=== The Forum ===
The Forum was an outdoor concert venue that was an architectural landmark. The Forum had a seating capacity of 7,370. It featured covered seating under a unique tent-like, metal framed, solid roof, with extra seating on the open surrounding, grassy hills. While having only half the seating capacity of the current Amphitheatre, it had (arguably) better sound, bench seating, and offered a far more intimate theatre in the round experience; featuring a rotating stage which gave every seat in the house, in turn, an excellent view.

Featured events included an annual Toronto Symphony rendition of Tchaikovsky's 1812 Overture, complete with the firing of the guns from the nearby HMCS Haida, and often performances by well established acts, such as B. B. King, Peter Tosh, Glen Campbell, Kenny Rogers, Johnny Cash, James Brown, Dizzy Gillespie, Jan & Dean, Pat Metheny, Blondie, Chic T, KC and the Sunshine Band and Canadian acts like Burton Cummings, Lighthouse, Bruce Cockburn, The Nylons, Luba, Men Without Hats, The Box, Doug and the Slugs, Parachute Club, Red Rider and Strange Advance. Unfortunately, due to a riot by Teenage Head fans in 1980 (purportedly instigated by their manager, who allegedly was interested in the publicity) harder rock acts were thereafter banned from the venue. In summer of 1983, the Forum was ahead of the curve by bringing in acts like Paul Young and the Royal Family and Tina Turner just before her huge comeback the following year.

The Forum was torn down at the end of the 1994 season. According to Lou Seller, the Ontario Place marketing and entertainment manager, the decision was made because "the Forum is quaint. It could not take big acts. The sightlines will be better, the acoustics will be better, we'll be able to offer a state-of-the-art concert experience." Sellers also said that Ontario Place was looking forward to an increase in attendance at the park, which cost the provincial treasury $4.5 million annually, 30% of its budget, an amount it wanted to decrease. The plan was criticized by the original Ontario Place architect Eb Zeidler, who suggested building the facility on the east island so as to keep the Forum, which he described as an engineering achievement that should be kept, and Ontario Place's landscape architect Michael Hough who criticized the cutting of trees necessary for the new facility. The plan was met with protests at Toronto City Hall, but the City of Toronto Council did not stop the project. The project was paid for by Molson Breweries and MCA (today's Live Nation).

=== Froster Soak City ===
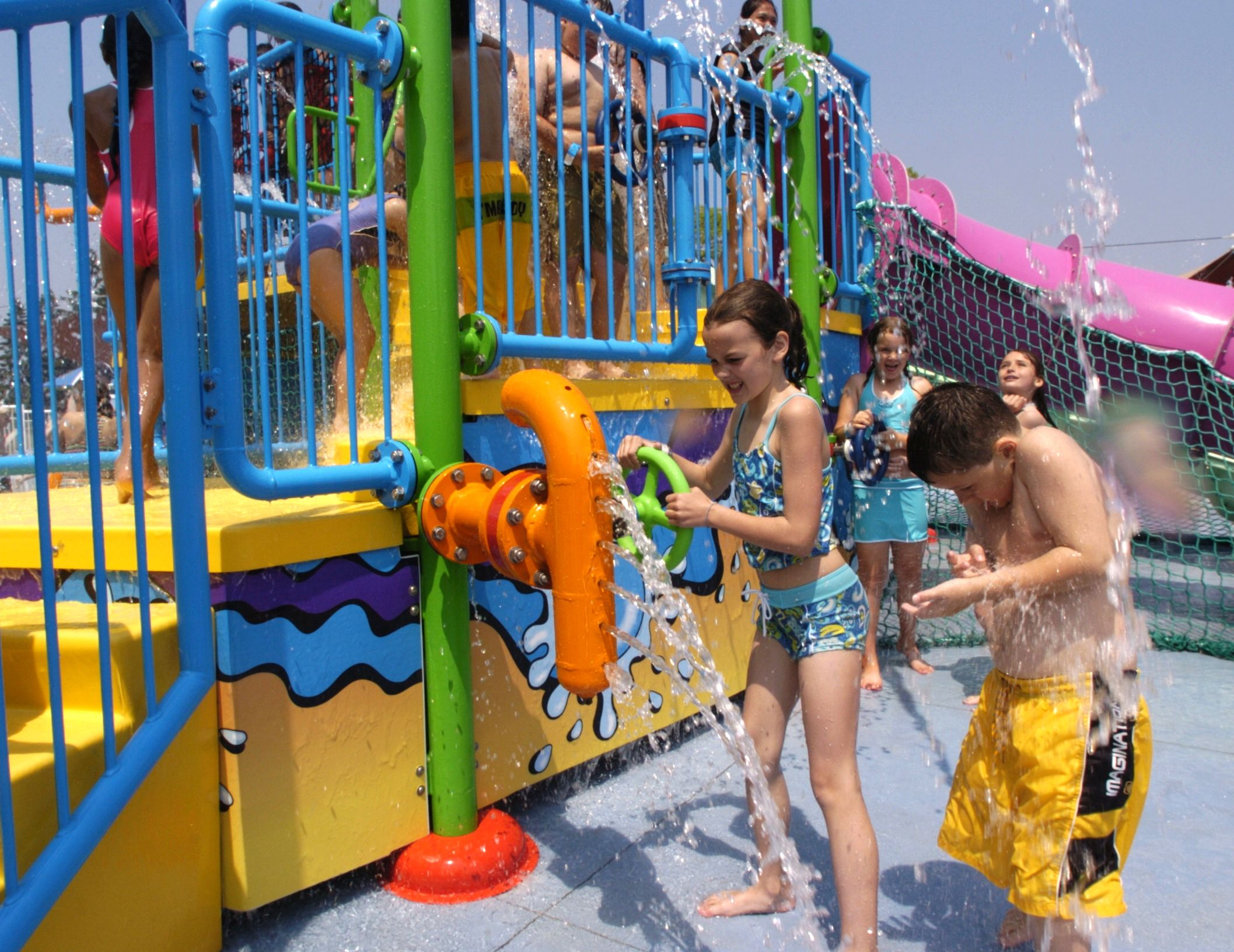
The splash had many valves people could interact with

The waterpark began with a concrete waterslide, Canada's first, opened in 1978 on the East Island infill. It was expanded with new water attractions (Hydrofuge in 1993 and Rush River Raft Ride, Pink Twister waterslide and Purple Pipeline waterslide in 1995) and eventually to the current Soak City theme in 2001. By the time of its closure, it had five water slides, a pool and a splash pad. In the Splash Pad area of the park, many of the features were interactive and controlled by user-operable valves. The valves are free-turning ball-valves connected to large handwheels.

==== Water park rides and features ====
- Hydrofuge – open 1993
- Lakeside Beach Spa Pool
- Pink Twister – open 1995
- Purple Pipeline – open 1995
- Rush River – open 1995
- Topsy Turvy – open August 2011
- Tipping Bucket
- Splash Pad

=== Other attractions and venues ===
- HMCS Haida, a decommissioned Second World War destroyer that was open to the public. In the early 1960s, the ship was going to be scrapped, but volunteers raised enough money to have it saved and towed to Toronto. It opened as an attraction in August 1965 at a pier at the foot of York Street. The city had planned to build a 'Serviceman's Memorial Park' near the Princes' Gates at Exhibition Place. When the organization 'Haida Inc.' ran into financial problems, the ship was taken over by the Government of Ontario and moved in 1970 to the Ontario Place site, where it was turned into an attraction. It was also used as a Sea Cadet training camp. In 2002, it was bought by Parks Canada. It was moved to a new home in Hamilton, Ontario and incorporated into a new marine museum in that city.
- Future Pod, opened in 1982 in Pod 5, featuring displays and exhibits in technology, communications and energy, including a full-sized replica of the Canadarm used on the Space Shuttle.
- The Canadian Baseball Hall of Fame and Museum, originally opened in Ontario Place before moving to its permanent home in St. Marys, Ontario.
- Ontario North Now, a themed area, made up the bulk of the west island, including the wilderness adventure ride, a simulated mine, and Muskeg Pete's Main Street. The mining exhibit became a weather exhibit in the 2000s.
- Nintendo Power Pod, an attraction that featured Super Nintendo Entertainment System, Game Boy, Virtual Boy, and Nintendo 64 games where guests played the then-latest Nintendo games.
- LEGO Creative Play Centre, located in a pod adjacent to the Nintendo Power Pod, this pod featured thousands of LEGO pieces for guests to play with.

=== List of 2011 (final) season rides and attractions ===
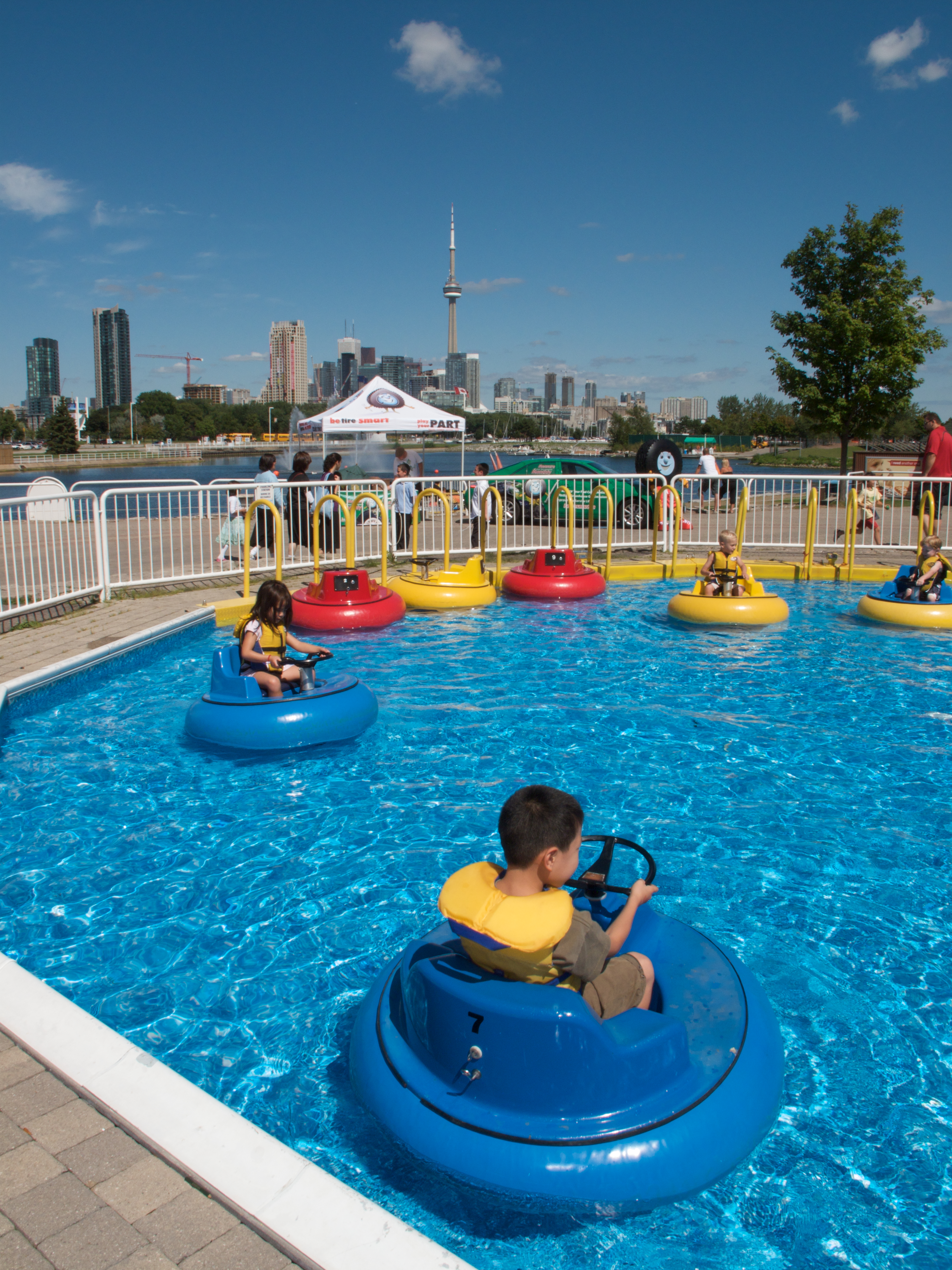
Ontario Place mini bumper boats in action, 2009

Numerous midway rides were temporarily installed at the park in its final season.

==== East Island ====
- Acrobatic Stage Show at Heritage Square, played for part of the final season.
- Power Wheels – This ride was closed in June 2011, early in the final season of the first era of the park.
- Mini Bumper Boats
- First Flight
- Free Fall
- Tilt-A-Whirl
- Mini Greens (mini golf)
- Super Slide
- 4D Ontario
- Cyclone Speedway
- Aquajet Racers
- Waterplay Splash Pad

==== Marina Village ====
- Cinesphere in IMAX 3D
- Atlantis – Restaurant/Club
- OP Driving School
- Bumper Boats
- H2O Generation Station
- Cool Hoops – Closed as of June 2011
- Marina with Lake Ontario access
- Boat School
- Eco-learning Centre
- Earth Rangers
- Mega Bounce
- Wacky Worm – Ontario Place's first and only roller-coaster

==== West Island ====
- Wilderness Adventure Ride
- 3D F/X Adventure Theatre
- National Helicopters
- Megamaze
- The Go Zone
- The Atom Blaster
- Treehouse Live! Waterfall Stage, previously on the East Island

== In popular media ==
Ontario Place served as a filming location for the episode "Angel of Death" from the TV series War of the Worlds. It was the setting for a shootout where Dr. Harrison Blackwood, his team, and a supposed alien ally confront the evil aliens which are personally led by the alien advocacy.

Ontario Place was also used for the filming of Urban Legends Final Cut as the "Tunnel of Terror" back in 1999. This scene shows the ride turned into a horror ride where two of the characters are killed by electrocution but the authorities believe it to be accidental.

It was used in Star Trek: Strange New Worlds' first-season episode "Ghosts of Illyria", doubling for exterior shots of the abandoned Hetemit IX colony.

== See also ==
- Venues of the 2015 Pan American and Parapan American Games
- List of music venues in Toronto
