= Cinesphere =

IMAX cinema in Toronto, Ontario, Canada

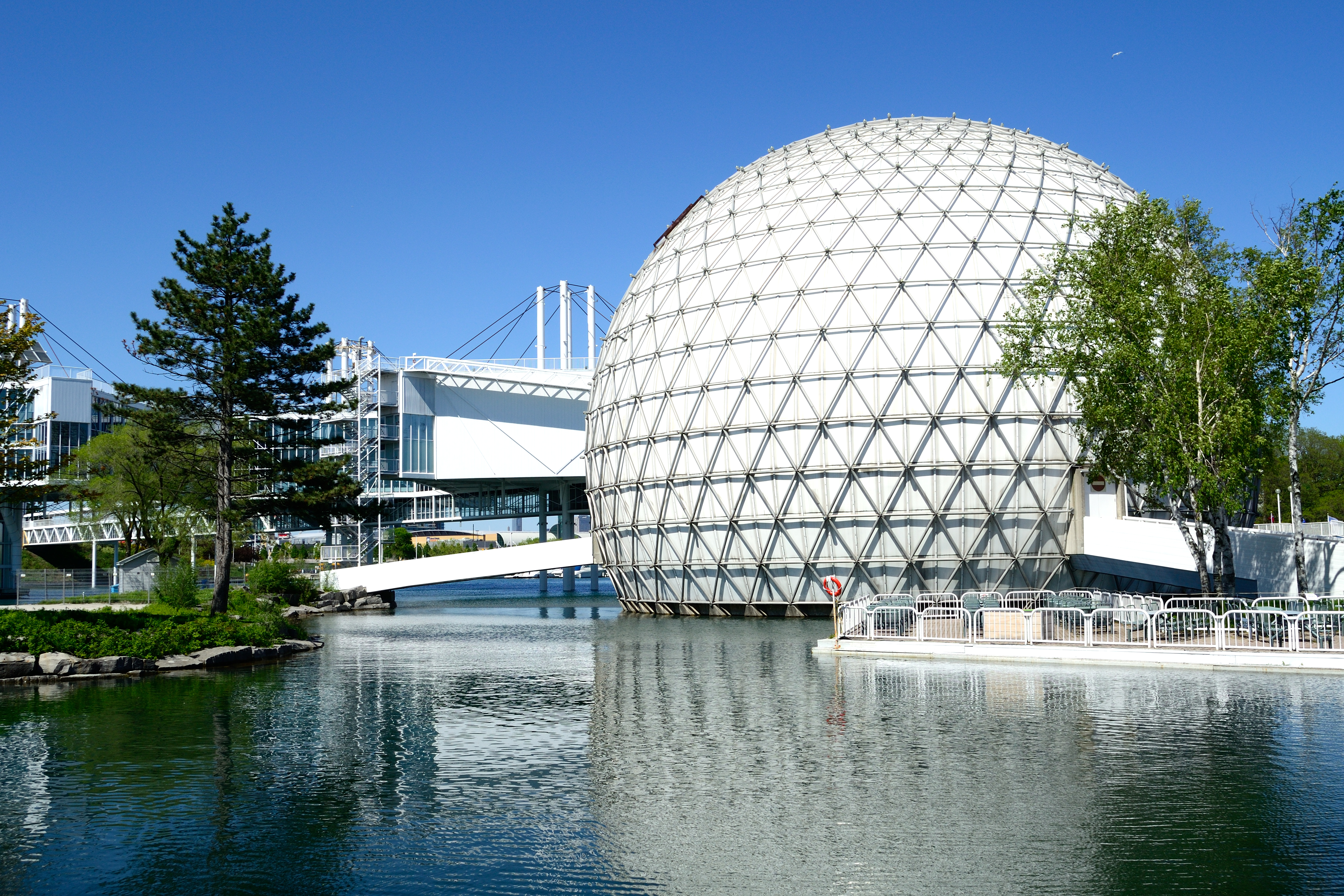

- Location of Cinesphere in Toronto

General information
- Type: Cinema (IMAX)
- Location: 955 Lake Shore Boulevard West, Toronto, Ontario, Canada
- Coordinates: 43°37′39.5″N 79°25′05.5″W
- Opened: May 22, 1971; 55 years ago
- Owner: Government of Ontario

Design and construction
- Architect: Eberhard Zeidler
- Architecture firm: Craig Zeidler Strong

Renovating team
- Renovating firm: Gow Hastings Architects (2011 and 2017 interior renovations)

Other information
- Seating capacity: 614; 527 (3D showings)

Website
- ontarioplace.com/en/cinesphere/

Cinesphere is the world's first permanent IMAX movie theatre, located on the grounds of Ontario Place in Toronto, Ontario, Canada. Constructed in 1971, it is the largest IMAX theatre in Ontario. The theatre has both IMAX 70mm and IMAX with Laser projection systems. The theatre is considered a building of heritage value and shows movies each weekend. It is owned by the Government of Ontario, which owns the entire Ontario Place site.

Cinesphere's is a 35-metre-wide (115 ft) triodetic-domed structure, akin to a geodesic dome, with a 19-metre (62 ft) outer radius, and a 17-metre (56 ft) inner radius, supported by prefabricated steel and aluminium alloy tubes. Eberhard Zeidler, who also designed the "Pods" of Ontario Place, also designed Cinesphere. Its screen is 24 metres (80 ft) wide by 18 metres (60 ft) high. Its seating capacity was originally 752, but this was reduced after a renovation for 3D projection in 2011 to 614. The building is surrounded by a moat, and the entrance area is through doorways on the east side connected to the Ontario Place pod bridges and staircases to the Ontario Place West Island. Exiting is done through doorways leading to ramps over the moat to the West Island. The seating is stadium-style seating with no obstructions. The Cinesphere is wheelchair accessible.

The Cinesphere opened with two specially-commissioned films. Graeme Ferguson's North of Superior was the first IMAX film commissioned for and screened at Cinesphere. Seasons in the Mind a non-IMAX film about Eastern Ontario, also played at the Cinesphere at its opening. During the run of the theme park, Cinesphere would usually show a programme of two or more one-hour films per day, repeated several times per day, from a selection of four Ontario-commissioned films. During the off-season, Cinesphere showed commercial films.

In 1991, the sound system was upgraded adding digital capabilities. In 2011, the original projection system was replaced with an IMAX GT 3D system and new NEXIOS playback system. In celebration of its 40th anniversary in 2011, the theatre closed for six months to undergo extensive renovations. Toronto architecture firm Gow Hastings Architects was awarded the refurbishment of the theatre in 2010. On February 1, 2012, the Government of Ontario announced that Cinesphere would close while Ontario Place is under renovation. On July 31, 2014, the Government of Ontario announced plans to revitalize the area as an urban park with the Cinesphere and pods retained. During the renovations, the theatre was used as a testbed for IMAX's new laser projection system. In 2014, the Government of Ontario designated Cinesphere as a structure of Cultural Heritage Value.

In 2017, a new projection system "IMAX with Laser" was installed in addition to its 70mm film projector. In September 2017, Cinesphere temporarily re-opened for special screenings of Dunkirk (2017) and North of Superior (1971) as part of the 2017 Toronto International Film Festival. In October 2017, the Government of Ontario announced that it would reopen as a permanent theatre. It reopened on November 3, 2017. On October 17, 2022, it was closed for renovations.

== Other details ==
- Film format: 15 perforation 70 mm IMAX, IMAX with Laser
- Sound formats: IMAX

== Awards ==
- 2017 Prix du XXe siècle - Royal Architectural Institute of Canada

== See also ==
- List of cinemas in Toronto
