= Trillium Park =

Park in Toronto, Canada

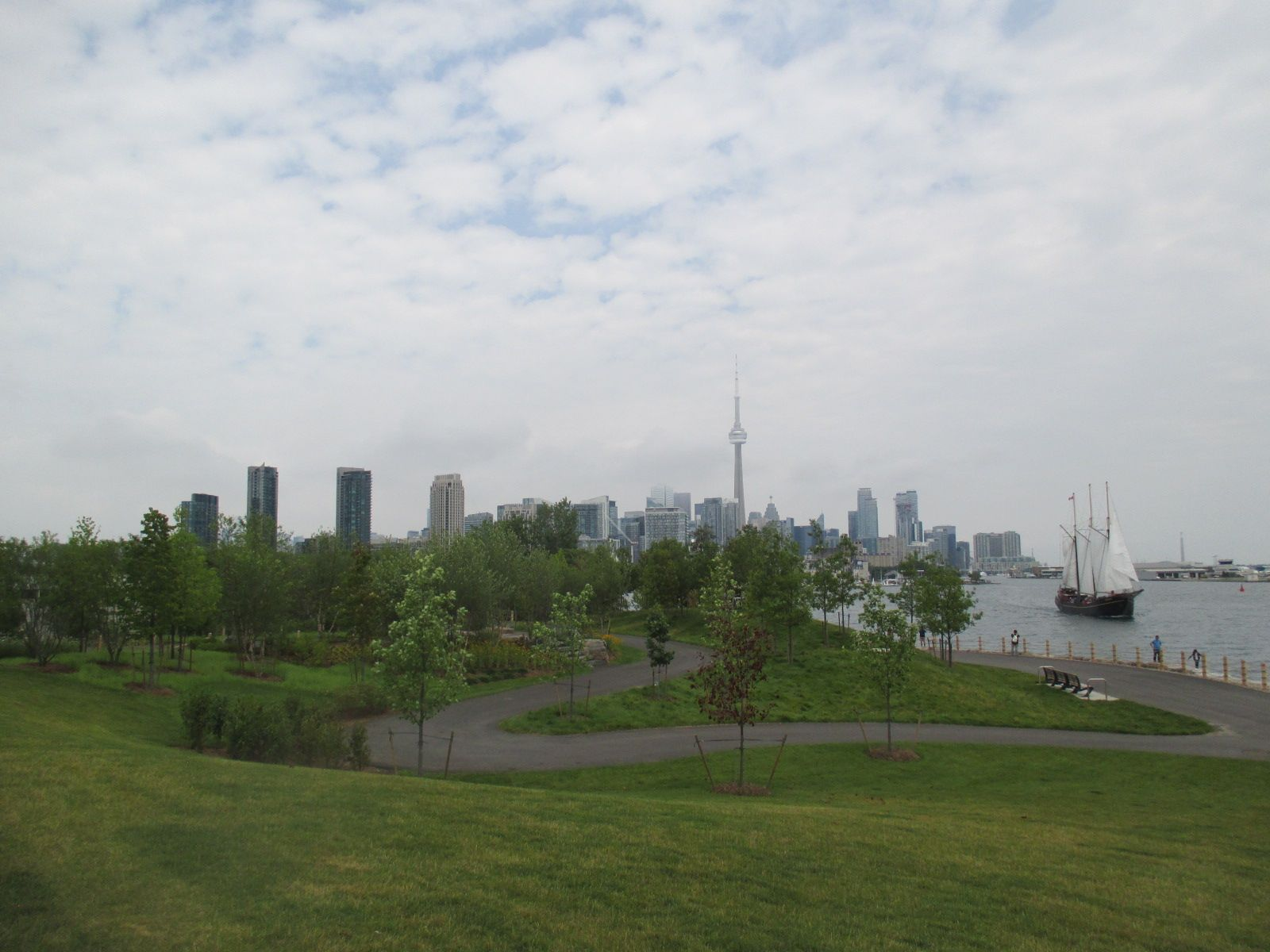
- View from the Summit in Trillium Park

- Location within Toronto
- Type: Public Park
- Location: Toronto, Ontario, Canada
- Coordinates: 43°37′48″N 79°24′35″W
- Area: 7.5 acres (3.0 ha)
- Open: June 19, 2017
- Website: Trillium Park and William G. Davis Trail

Trillium Park is a park in Toronto owned and operated by the Government of Ontario. Various Ontario landscapes inspired the park design. The William G. Davis Trail passes through the park connecting it to the Martin Goodman Trail.

== Background ==
Trillium Park is part of a revitalization plan for Ontario Place. In 1971, Ontario Premier Bill Davis opened Ontario Place, which operated a season of events and entertainment annually from May to October. Ontario Place closed in 2012 after annual attendance fell from 2.5 million to 300,000. In 2012, the province appointed John Tory (who later became mayor of Toronto) to come up with ideas to revive the Ontario Place site. He recommended "Condos on the west island, a hotel or resort, corporate headquarters or educational research institute on no more than 15 per cent of the prime waterfront site" - ideas that resulted in a public backlash. In 2014, the Ontario Ministry of Tourism, Culture and Sport developed its own ideas for a "culture, discovery and innovation hub" with a "Blue Park" to include the Cinesphere and its elevated pods, a "Canal District", a "Celebration Common" and a park and trail. As of July 2017, only the latter two - Trillium Park and the William G. Davis Trail - were implemented with any further development yet to be defined.

== Development ==
The park was developed through a consortium. The construction company Urbacon was the project lead. Landscape architecture firm LANDinc was the design lead in collaboration with West 8 Urban Design & Landscape Architecture. The project was managed by Infrastructure Ontario and was sponsored by the Ontario Ministry of Tourism, Culture and Sport. The project took three and half years to complete of which construction took over two years.

Trillium Park was built on the site of a former parking lot at a cost of CA$30 million. To guard against high lake water levels, the site of the park was raised 1.5 metres (4 ft 11 in) using 52,000 cubic metres of soil. To prevent erosion, there were repairs to nearly 600 metres (2,000 ft) of the shoreline.

Park construction used building and plant materials from across the province. Almost 1,200 Ontario trees were planted in the park including red oak, red pine, and sugar maple marker trees supplied by nurseries within the province. About 28,000 shrubs and perennials were planted including highbush cranberry, wild ginger and St. John's Wort. The park's bluff feature used 1,700 tonnes of Muskoka granite stone from a quarry in Huntsville, the largest stone weighing 52 tons. 140 individual granite slabs from Northern Ontario were used to complete the bluff's granite wall.

== Features ==
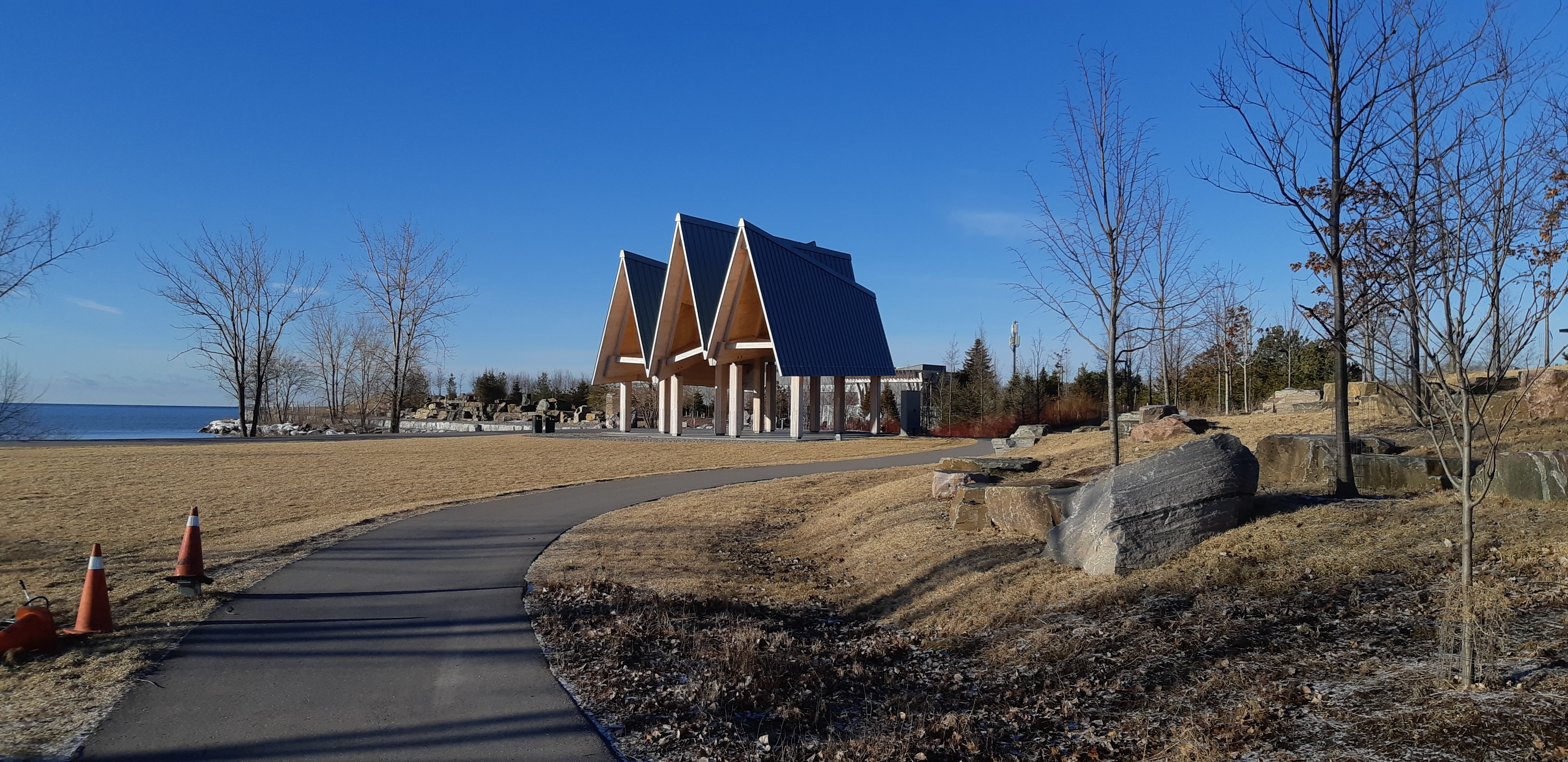
View of Trillium Park pavilion in 2019.

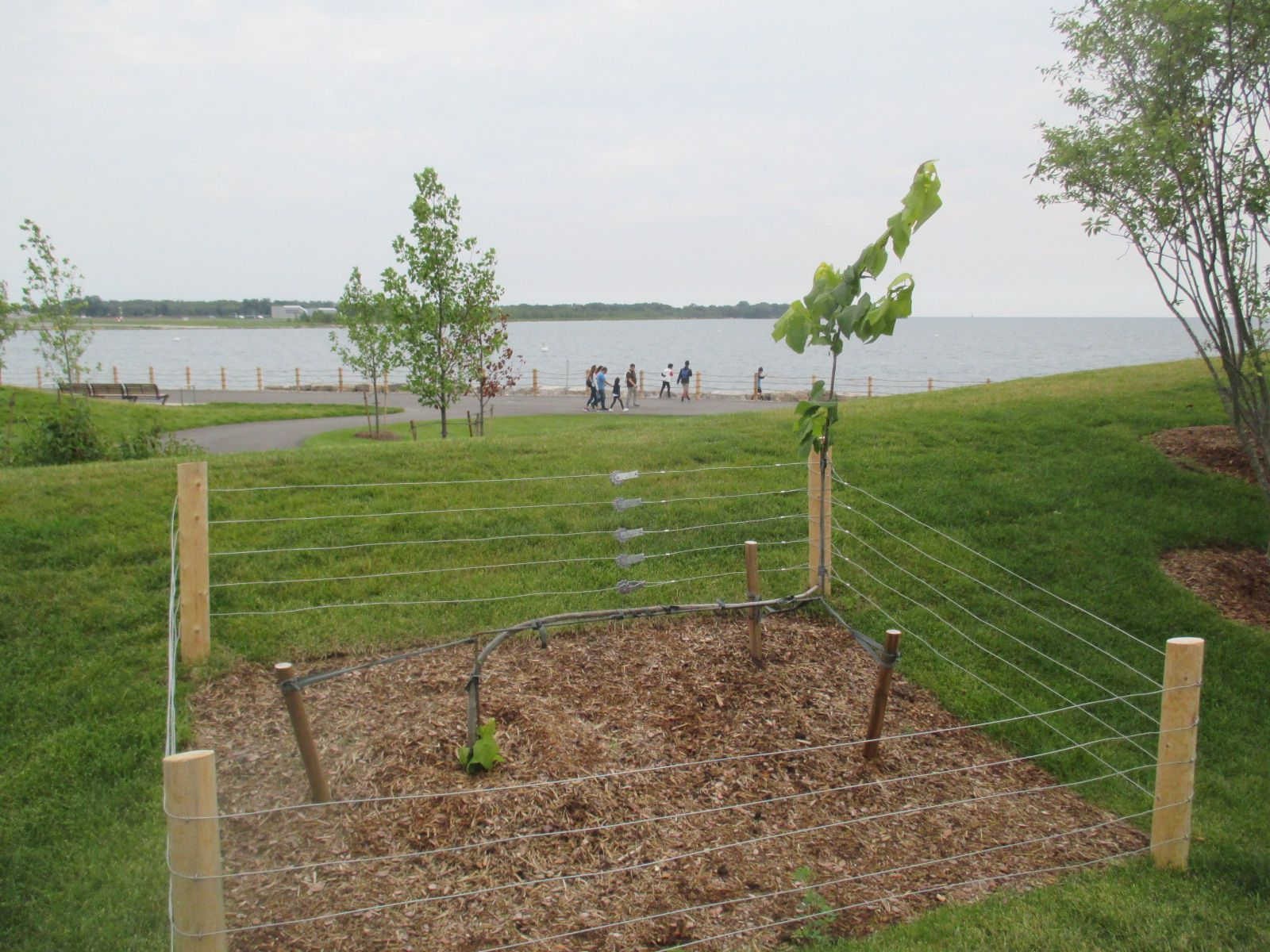
A marker tree in the park

According to LANDinc, Trillium Park was created as an urban forest providing a natural-looking landscape with native tree and shrub species. The park consists of trails, rolling landforms, rock outcrops and pebble beaches, and offers views of the city and Lake Ontario.

The major features of the park are as follows:

- The William G. Davis Trail is 1.3 km (0.81 mi) long and is named after former premier of Ontario Bill Davis. It lies on the west side of the park connecting it to the Martin Goodman Trail.
- A Ravine with Moccasin Identifier passes under a bicycle/pedestrian bridge at the entrance to the park. The Mississaugas of the New Credit First Nation helped with the development of images of moccasins carved on the walls of the ravine.
- Sunrise Garden Pavilion is an open-air structure inspired by evergreen forests and the structures of Ontario Place. It provides space for shelter, activities and gatherings. It was designed by West 8.
- The Romantic Garden is an open space for rest or activity.
- The Fire Pit is located along the water’s edge near the Sunrise Garden Pavilion, where visitors can hold bonfires and admire the view of the city about the CN Tower.
- The Bluff is along the water's edge consisting of stacked boulders and rocks. Within the Bluff is a long shared sitting area providing views out over the lake.
- The Summit is located at the southern end of the park, and is the highest point in the park. It provides sitting locations on its gentle slopes as well as views over the park and the lake.
- West Gate Integration Point is a decorative gate designed by LANDinc situated between Trillium Park and the inactive Ontario Place. As of the park's opening, the gate was not yet open as it exists to support future development of the Ontario Place site.

Other park features are:

- Three marker trees, a traditional First Nations' way of navigation, were created by forcing the three young trees to each grow with two 90-degree bends in the trunk.
- Washroom facilities are at the entrance.
