= Ouimet Canyon =

Canyon in Ontario, Canada

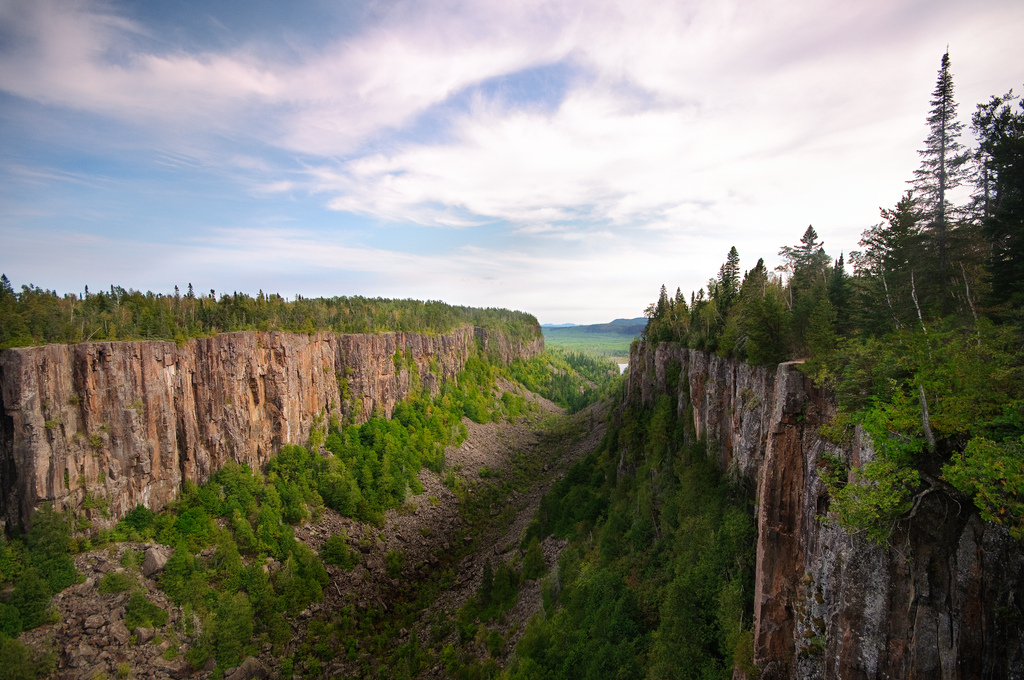

- Location within Ontario
- Floor elevation: 311 m (1,020 ft)
- Length: 2,000 metres (2.0 km; 1.2 mi) North-South
- Width: 150 metres (490 ft)
- Depth: 100 metres (330 ft)

Geology
- Type: Eroded diabase sill

Geography
- Location: Thunder Bay District, Ontario, Canada
- Coordinates: 48°47′39″N 88°40′01″W
- Topo map: NTS 52A15 Greenwich Lake
- Interactive map of Ouimet Canyon

Ouimet Canyon is a large gorge in the municipality of Dorion, Thunder Bay District in northwestern Ontario, Canada, about 60 kilometres (37 mi) northeast of the city of Thunder Bay. The gorge is 100 metres (330 ft) deep, 150 metres (490 ft) wide and 2,000 metres (2.0 km; 1.2 mi) long, protected as part of Ouimet Canyon Provincial Park.

There is a walkway consisting of boardwalks and trails, which leads to viewing platforms overlooking the canyon. Visitors to the canyon should remain on the marked trails for their own safety. Also in the Ouimet Canyon area, there are rare alpine flowers that are considered especially beautiful and arctic plants normally found one thousand kilometres further north. The canyon is shown in the IMAX film North of Superior.

The canyon was named after the former railway station of Ouimet, located nearby on the Canadian Pacific Railway line. The station itself was named after the Canadian Minister of Public Works from 1892 to 1896, Joseph-Aldric Ouimet.

Ouimet Canyon Provincial Park, a day-use park with no camping facilities, covers an area of 7.77 square kilometres (3.00 sq mi) around the canyon.

== Geology ==
The canyon is believed to have formed when a diabase sill dating from a billion years earlier was split open, either by the weight of advancing glaciers or the large volumes of water released during their retreat. Erosion by wind and rain continued the formation of the canyon. A large rock column known as the Indian Head can be seen from the northern viewing area.

== Eagle Canyon ==
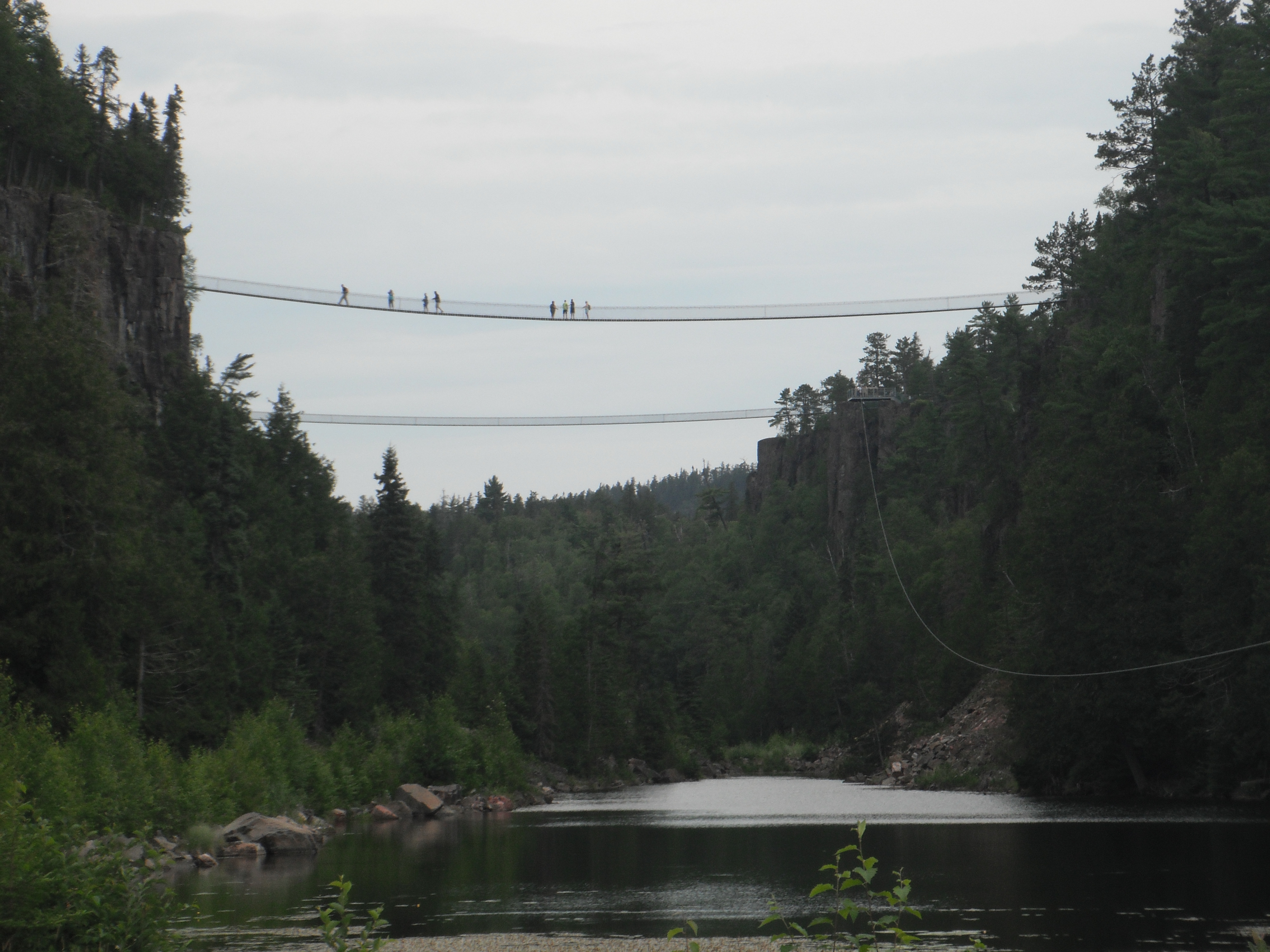
Suspension bridges at Eagle Canyon

Near Ouimet Canyon is the privately owned and operated Eagle Canyon, which features on-site camping, two footbridges spanning the gorge and a zip line.

The longer of the two footbridges is 182 metres (597 ft) long and is suspended 45 metres (148 ft) above the canyon floor. It claims to be Canada's longest foot suspension bridge, but is not, because Souris swinging bridge in Manitoba, re-built in 2013 is 604 ft long The zip line is claimed to be 0.5 miles (0.80 km) long and is advertised as Canada's longest, highest (175 feet (53 m)) and fastest (45 miles per hour (72 km/h)).

== See also ==
- Agawa Canyon
- Achray, Ontario
- Barron River (Ontario)
