= North of Superior =

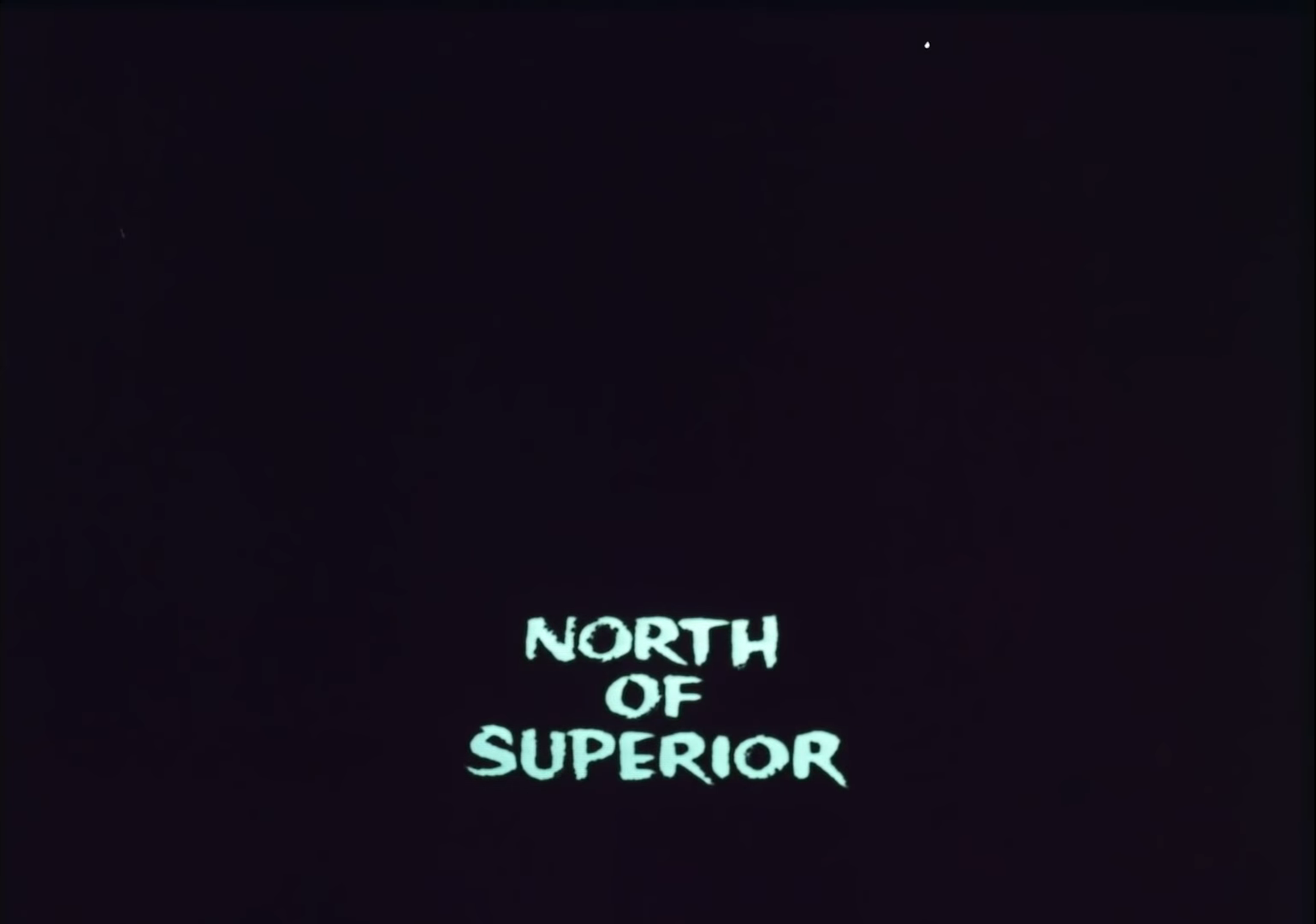
- Title screen
- Directed by: Graeme Ferguson
- Produced by: Graeme Ferguson
- Cinematography: Graeme Ferguson
- Edited by: Toni Trow
- Music by: Zal Yanovsky
- Release date: January 1, 1971 (Canada)
- Running time: 18 minutes
- Country: Canada
- Language: English
- Budget: CA$270,000

North of Superior is a 1971 Canadian IMAX film directed by Graeme Ferguson. It is a travelogue of the area of Ontario, north of Lake Superior. It was commissioned for the then-new Ontario Place and was one of the first IMAX films made.

Designed to show off the large-size screen and detail of IMAX images, the film continues to be shown in IMAX festivals, and has been exhibited internationally. It used extensive flying scenes that provide an in-flight effect that would become widely imitated in future IMAX films.

== Plot ==
North of Superior is 18 minutes long, the length of time a single IMAX reel could hold at the time. The film begins with aerial shots of Lake Superior and Ouimet Canyon. It then depicts a canoe capsizing, the Canada Steamship Lines ship Simcoe, people tubing on snow, workers removing snow from rail tracks, mining activity at a snowy terrace, and children playing ice hockey. After several people reforest trees, a moose hunting is depicting, then a wedding by the lake. This is followed by a montage of a village community enjoying their lives and going to church. At night, a fire occurs at a forest, and extinguishing begins by dawn. It succeeds after difficulty, and people begin reforesting again.

== Production ==
The film was commissioned for the new Cinesphere, the new and first IMAX theatre that opened at Ontario Place in 1971. The film, the first official IMAX film, cost CDN$270,000 to produce. It was produced and directed by the founders of IMAX Corporation, then known as Multiscreen Corporation: Roman Kroitor, Graeme Ferguson, Robert Kerr, and Bill Shaw. As it was one of the first IMAX films, production equipment was invented for the production. One of the cameras used was held together by duct tape. Mounting equipment for the helicopters used in the film had to be custom-made.

In its initial run during the Ontario Place season of 1971, over 1.1 million people viewed the film. The film repeatedly returned to Cinesphere and was one of the last films shown (on the original IMAX projector) at Cinesphere in December 2011, after which Cinesphere and Ontario Place closed for a future redevelopment. As part of the Infuture art festival held at Ontario Place in September 2016, the film was shown again at the Cinesphere. It is considered the most widely seen Canadian IMAX film. As part of the Toronto International Film Festival, a pristine 70mm IMAX print of the film was presented yet again at Cinesphere on a newly installed screen. Graeme Ferguson was present for the screening, as was the film's editor, Toni Trow.

The aerial shot, along with the large IMAX screen, induced the "Kinesthetic effect" which meant that viewers would experience the flying sensation due to eye perception over-ruling the inner ear balance. Viewers were warned to close their eyes if they experienced any discomfort.

== Music ==
Singer/songwriter Bill Houston composed the original song Ojibway Country for the film. The score is credited to Zal Yanovsky.

Thunder Bay native Paul Shaffer, later a well known performer, appears briefly in one scene playing an organ at an outdoor wedding.
